= Sign prayer =

One of the Shia obligatory prayers

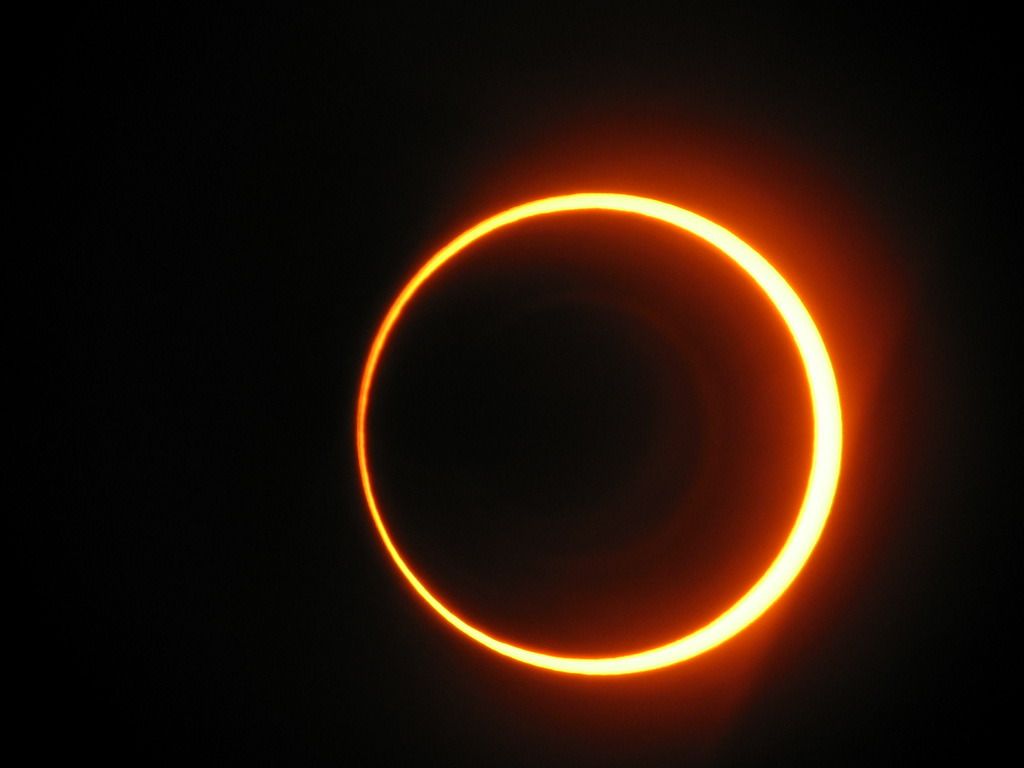
Annular solar eclipse

The signs prayer (Arabic: صلاة الآيات, romanized: Ṣalāt al-ʾĀyāt) is a Muslim prayer that is optional for Sunni but mandatory for Shīʿa Muslims. When solar or lunar eclipses, earthquakes, thunder, or other natural phenomena (described as signs, hence the name signs prayer) occur, Muslims may have to pray Ṣalāt al-ʾĀyāt. In Twelver Shia Islam, al-Ayat Prayer consists of two Rakats, and there are five Ruku in each. It is for specific conditions and has been described in detail in resalah of marja's.

== Background ==
It is reported that there was a solar eclipse on the day that Ibrahim, the son of Islamic prophet Muhammad died; people thought that the eclipse was due to his death. To this, Muhammad replied: "The sun and the moon do not eclipse because of the death or life (i.e. birth) of someone. When you see the eclipse pray and invoke Allah."

== Requirement in Shia Islam ==
Although optional for Sunnis, Salat al-Ayat is obligatory for Shias upon the occurrence of the following phenomena:

- Solar and lunar eclipses, even if partial or unfrightening.
- Earthquakes, even if unfrightening.
- Urooj Zaidi stated that it is mandatory for frightening lightning.

== Manner of performing ==
=== Shia Islam ===
==== Twelver ====
Al-Ayat Prayers consists of two Rakats with five Ruku in each, performed as follows:

Method 1

- After making niyyah of offering the prayers, one should say takbir (Allahu Akbar), then recite Surah al-fatiha and another Surah, then perform the Ruku.
- Thereafter, one should stand and recite Surah al-fatiha and a Surah, then perform another Ruku.
- Repeat this action five times. After the fifth Ruku, perform two Sujud.
- Then one should stand up to perform the second Rakat in the same manner as done in the first.
- Finally recite Tashahhud and Salam.

Method 2

- After making niyyah to offer al-Ayat Prayers, a person is allowed to say takbir and recite Surah al-Fatiha, then divide the verses of the other Surah into five parts, and recite one verse or more or less, thereafter perform the Ruku.
- Stand up and recite another part of the Surah (without reciting Surah al-Fatiha) and then perform another Ruku. Repeat this action and finish that Surah before performing the fifth Ruku.

== See also ==
- Salat
- Asr prayer
- Maghrib prayer
- Isha prayer
