= Raf al-Yadayn =

"Raising of the hands" in Islamic prayer

Rafʿ al-Yadayn (Arabic: رَفْعُ الْيَدَيْن; lit. 'raising of the hands') is a Sunnah of the Islamic prophet Muhammad of raising the hands during the Rukū of Salah (Islamic prayer). This practice is widely found in the Hadiths and followed differently among Islamic schools of thought.

== Etymology ==
The term Raf' al-Yadayn literally means 'raising of the hands' in Arabic. It is derived from the root word رَفَعَ (rafa'a), meaning 'to raise', and يَدَيْن (yadayn), meaning 'hands'.

== Jurisprudential views ==
Islamic jurisprudence, or fiqh, includes different interpretations of Raf' al-Yadayn based on Hadith evidence and scholarly opinions. The practice varies across the four major Sunni schools of thought:

=== Hanafi school ===
The Hanafis generally limit Raf' al-Yadayn to the Takbeer al-Tahreema (opening Takbeer) and do not perform it during other transitions in Salah. This view is based on their understanding of the Hadiths narrated by companions like Abdullah ibn Mas'ud (e.g., Sunan Abu Dawood, Hadith 748).

=== Shafi'i school ===
The Shafi'is uphold the practice of Raf' al-Yadayn and consider it a Sunnah Including:

- The opening Takbeer
- Before bowing (Ruku')
- After rising from Ruku'

=== Maliki school ===
The Malikis are divided on following the practice of Raf' al-Yadayn. Some consider the additional instances non-obligatory and not emphasized in practice; While some argue that it is a Sunnah and one must practice it in Salah. Malik ibn Anas, in his hadith collection Muwatta Imam Malik, narrated that "the Messenger of Allah, may Allah bless him and grant him peace, used to raise his hands to the level of his shoulders when he began the prayer and when he raised his head from the ruku he raised them in the same way."

Raf' al-Yadayn also appears in Muhammad al-Bukhari's Sahih al-Bukhari: "Narrated Salim bin `Abdullah: My father said, 'Allah's Messenger (ﷺ) used to raise both his hands up to the level of his shoulders when opening the prayer; and on saying the Takbir for bowing. And on raising his head from bowing he used to do the same and then say "Sami`a l-lahu liman hamidah, Rabbana wa laka l-hamd." And he did not do that (i.ostrations'".e. raising his hands) in pr The chain of this hadith contains Nafi Mawla Ibn Umar, Abd Allah ibn Umar ibn al-Khattab, Malik ibn Anas and Ibn Shihab az-Zuhri.

=== Hanbali school ===
The Hanbalis, like the Shafi'is, emphasize performing Raf' al-Yadayn at all prescribed points. They rely on Hadiths such as the one narrated by Abdullah ibn Umar, recorded in Sahih al-Bukhari (Hadith 739).

=== Ahl-i Hadith / Salafi view ===
The Ahl-i Hadith (often associated in contemporary usage with the Salafi methodology) regard Rafʿ al-Yadayn as a continuous sunnah of Muhammad that was not abrogated. According to this view, raising the hands is prescribed at the following points in Salah:

- At the opening Takbeer (Takbeer al-Tahreemah)
- Before bowing (Rukūʿ)
- After rising from bowing
- When standing for the third Rakʿah after the first Tashahhud

This position is based on numerous hadith reports narrated by multiple companions, including ʿAbdullah ibn ʿUmar, Malik ibn Huwayrith, Waʾil ibn Hujr, ʿAli ibn Abi Talib, Jabir ibn ʿAbdullah, Abu Musa al-Ashʿari, and Abu Humayd al-Saʿidi.

Among the most frequently cited narrations is the hadith of ʿAbdullah ibn ʿUmar, who stated that Muhammad raised his hands when beginning the prayer, when going into Rukūʿ, and when rising from it, and that he did not do so during prostration. This narration is recorded in Sahih al-Bukhari and Sahih Muslim and was consistently practiced by Ibn ʿUmar himself, as well as by his son Salim, indicating continuity of practice after Muhammad's death.

The Hadith of Malik ibn Huwayrith further supports this view. He reported that Muhammad instructed his companions to pray as they had seen him pray, and Malik was later observed raising his hands at the same points in Salah after Muhammad's death, as recorded in Sahih al-Bukhari and Sahih Muslim.

Additional narrations describing Rafʿ al-Yadayn are reported from Waʾil ibn Hujr and ʿAli ibn Abi Talib, recorded in Sahih Muslim, Sunan Abi Dawud, Musnad Ahmad, and other Hadith collections. Several of these narrations are graded Sahih or Hasan by classical Hadith scholars such as al-Tirmidhi, Ibn Khuzaymah, Ibn Hibban, and al-Nawawi.

Ahl al-Hadith scholars argue that no authentic Hadith establishes the abrogation of Rafʿ al-Yadayn. They also cite reports showing that numerous Companions continued this practice and taught it to later generations, which they consider evidence of its persistence within the early Muslim community.

Modern proponents of the Ahl al-Hadith and Salafi approach therefore encourage practicing Rafʿ al-Yadayn at all authentically reported positions, viewing it as adherence to the sunnah rather than affiliation with a particular legal school.

== Practice in Salah ==
Muhammad is reported to have performed Raf' al-Yadayn at various stages of Salah , including:

- Before Takbeer al-Tahreema (opening Takbeer):

"He raised his hands up to the level of his shoulders and said Allahu Akbar."

— Sahih al-Bukhari, Hadith 735 • Before and after Ruku' (bowing):

"He raised his hands when going into Ruku' and when rising from it."

— Sahih Muslim, Hadith 390

- When standing up after the second Rak'ah in Salah:

Whenever Ibn `Umar started the prayer with Takbir, he used to raise his hands: whenever he bowed, he used to raise his hands (before bowing) and also used to raise his hands on saying, "Sami`a l-lahu liman hamidah", and he used to do the same on rising from the second rak`a (for the 3rd rak`a). Ibn `Umar said: "The Prophet (ﷺ) used to do the same."

— Sahih al-Bukhari 739
