= Julus =

Julus may refer to:

- Ascanius, or Julus, a king in Roman mythology
- Julus (millipede)
- julūs, a sitting prayer posture in Islam

== See also ==
- Julia gens
