= Afternoon service =

Afternoon service (a worship that is held in the afternoon) may refer to:

- Shacharit in Judaism
- Asr in Islam
