= Evening service =

Evening service (a worship that is held in the evening) may refer to:

== Judaism ==
- Maariv in Judaism

== Christianity ==
- Vespers, a canonical hour in Christianity
- An evening service of worship held on the Lord's Day in many Christian denominations
- A midweek evening service of worship held on Wednesday in many Christian denominations
- Evening service, a portion of the Anglican liturgy set to music by Henry Purcell and many other composers

== Islam ==
- Maghrib prayer in Islam
