= Muhammad's eclipse =

632 solar eclipse

Solar eclipse of 27 January 632
- Annular eclipse
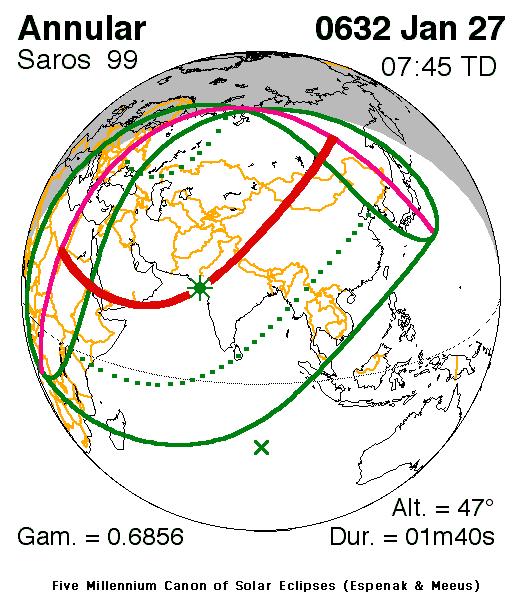
- Solar eclipse of 27 January 632
- Gamma: 0.6856
- Magnitude: 0.9836

Maximum eclipse
- Duration: 100 s (01m 40s)
- Coordinates: 22.7°N 70.5°E
- Max. width of band: 78.4 km

Times (UTC)
- (P1) Partial begin: 03:57:45
- (U1) Total begin: 05:10:05
- Greatest eclipse: 06:31:27
- (U4) Total end: 07:52:33
- (P4) Partial end: 09:05:03

References
- Saros: 99 (23 of 72)

An annular solar eclipse, known as Muhammad's eclipse, occurred on 27 January 632 and was visible across parts of East Africa, North Africa, the Middle East, Central Asia, South Asia, the Far East, and Siberia. A solar eclipse occurs when the Moon passes between the Earth and the Sun, thereby totally or partly obscuring the image of the Sun for a viewer on Earth. An annular solar eclipse occurs when the apparent diameter of the Moon is smaller than that of the Sun, presenting as the Moon blocking most, but not all, of the Sun's light and causing the Sun to look like an annulus (ring). This eclipse had a magnitude of 0.9836. This eclipse is especially relevant to the history of Islam as it is identified as the eclipse that occurred during the life of the Islamic prophet, Muhammad, upon the death of his youngest son, Ibrahim. It is exclusively documented in Islamic sīrah (biographies of Muhammad) and hadith literature.

== Within Islamic sources ==
The occurrence of the eclipse during the life of Islamic prophet Muhammad earned it the epithet 'Muhammad's eclipse'. The eclipse is well-documented in early Islamic sources, but no references to it have been found elsewhere. The eclipse occurred around the time of the death of Muhammad's youngest son, Ibrahim, who was 18 months old. Rumours of God's personal condolences quickly arose. It was also believed in pre-Islamic Arabia that eclipses occurred at the death of a great man. Muhammad denied the rumours and rejected the pre-Islamic beliefs.

=== Eclipse prayer and sermon ===
Muslims believe the eclipse prayer performed during solar and lunar eclipses was first performed by Muhammad during this eclipse, thereafter becoming a sunnah. A hadith narrated by Abd Allah ibn Amr ibn al-As in Sunan Abi Dawud asserts that Muhammad performed the prayer from when the eclipse was observed until the sun was clear. Narrations by Jabir ibn Abd Allah, Asma bint Abi Bakr, and Abu Musa al-Ash'ari in Sunan an-Nasa'i, Sahih Muslim, and Sahih al-Bukhari, respectively, also describe a long prayer with Muhammad having stood, bowed, and prostrated for long periods of time.

Muhammad delivered a khutbah (sermon) following the prayer, saying:

The sun and the moon are two of God’s signs; they are not eclipsed on account of anyone’s death or on account of anyone's birth, so when you see that, supplicate God, declare His greatness, pray, and give alms. [...] O people of Muhammad, I swear by God that no one is more indignant than God when His servant or handmaiden commits fornication. O people of Muhammad, I swear by God that if you knew what I know you would laugh little and weep much.

== Related eclipses ==
=== Eclipses in 632 ===
This eclipse was the first of three solar eclipses that occurred in the year 632.

- A penumbral lunar eclipse on January 13.
- An annular solar eclipse on January 27.
- A penumbral lunar eclipse on July 7.
- An annular solar eclipse on July 23.
- A partial solar eclipse on December 17.

=== Tzolkinex ===
A tzolkinex cycle repeats every 88 lunations (2,598.691 days), or roughly 7 years, 1 month and 12 days.

- Preceding: Solar eclipse of December 16, 624
- Following: Solar eclipse of March 10, 639

=== Tritos ===
A tritos cycle repeats every 135 lunations (3,986.628 days), or roughly 10 years and 11 months.

- Preceding: Solar eclipse of February 27, 621
- Following: Sclipse of December 27, 642

=== Saros ===
A saros cycle repeats every 223 lunations (6,585.321 days), or roughly 18 years and 11 days. This eclipse was the 23rd of 72 solar eclipses in Saros Series 99, which started with a partial solar eclipse visible in the Northern Hemisphere on June 3, 235, and ended with another partial solar eclipse in the Southern Hemisphere on July 11, 1515. All eclipses in this series occurred at the Moon's ascending node.

- Preceding: Solar eclipse of January 15, 614
- Following: Solar eclipse of February 6, 650

=== Inex ===
An inex cycle repeats every 358 lunations (10,571.95 days), or roughly 29 years minus 20 days.

- Preceding: Solar eclipse of February 17, 603
- Following: Solar eclipse of January 6, 661

=== Triad ===
A triad cycle repeats every 1,074 lunations (31,715.85 days), or roughly 86 years and 304 days.

- Preceding: Solar eclipse of March 28, 545
- Following: Solar eclipse of November 26, 718

== See also ==
- Splitting of the Moon
- Sunnah prayer – Optional ritual prayers performed by Muslims, one of which is the eclipse prayer.
- Assyrian eclipse – Another historical solar eclipse that occurred in the year 763 BC; mentioned in the Bible.
