= Salatul Tasbih =

Form of prayer in Islam

Salatul Tasbih (صلاة تسبيح) also known as supplication prayer, is a form of sunnah prayer that involves reciting the tasbih many times and it is said those who do this will have many of their sins forgiven. Muhammad advised Muslims to pray this way at least once in their lifetimes.

The prayer consists of four rakats divided into two separate sets.

== See also ==
- Tahajjud
- Mubah
