= Qiyam =

Practice in Islamic prayer

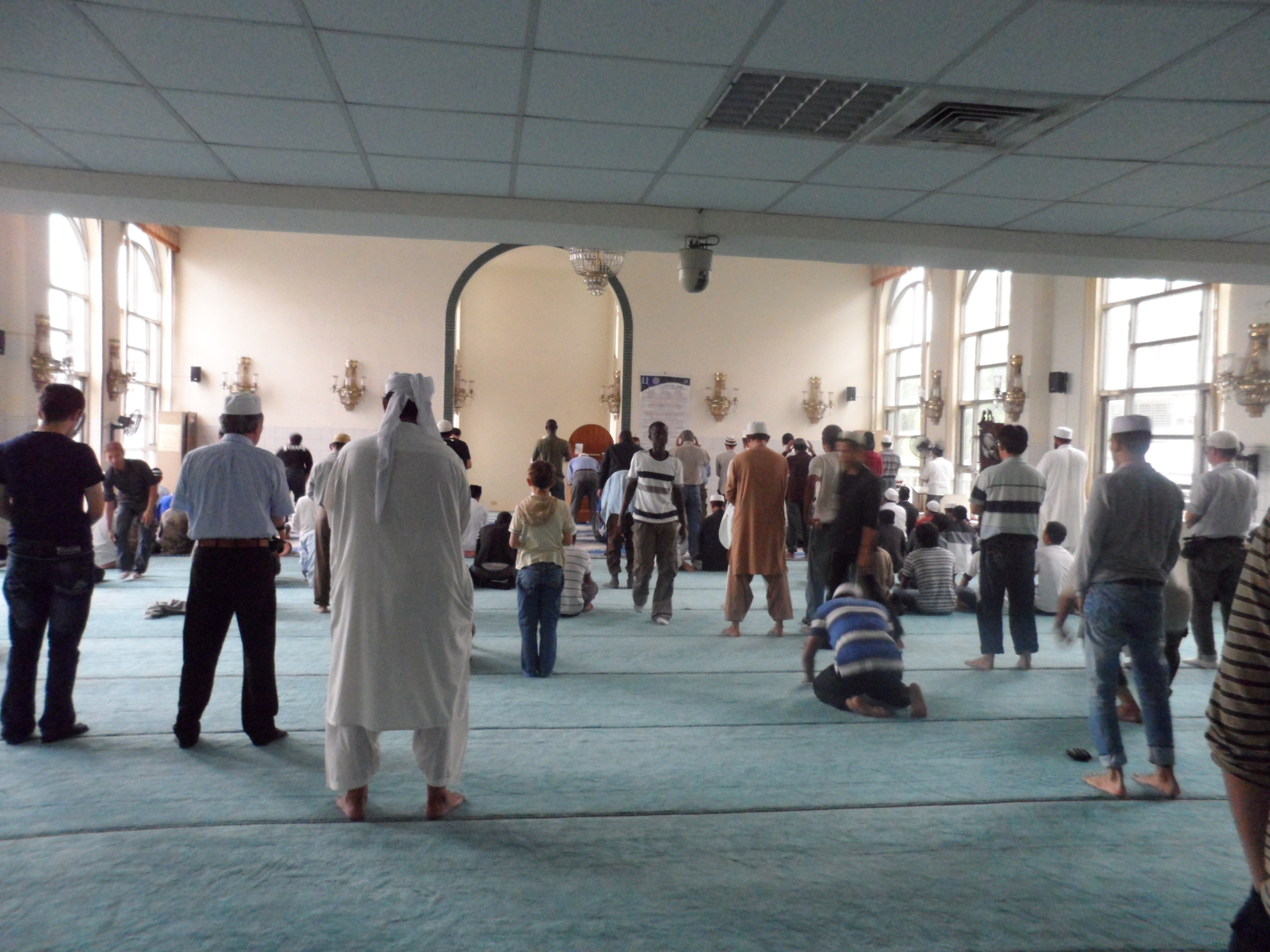
Qiyam at Kaohsiung Mosque in Taiwan.

Qiyām (Arabic: قيام, "orthostasis/standing") is an integral part of the Islamic salah. The prayer begins in this standing position and some prayers only require the qiyām, such as Salat al-Janazah.

== In the Quran ==
To "stand before God" is sometimes used in the Quran in reference to the Islamic prayer.

Guard strictly your (habit of) prayers, especially the Middle Prayer; and stand before Allah in a devout (frame of mind).

— Quran, (2:238)

== Overview ==
A general unit or cycle of salah called raka'ah is commenced while standing and saying the takbir, which is الله أَڪْبَر (transliteration "Allahu-akbar", meaning God is Greatest). The hands are raised level with shoulders or level with top of the ears, with fingers apart and not spaced out or together. It is in this position that sections of the Quran are recited.

I'tidāl is straightening up from ruku' to stand a second time. The back is straightened and the following is said: سَمِعَ اللَّهُ لِمَنْ حَمِدَهُ (Sami' Allāhu liman ḥamidah, meaning “Allah hears whoever praises Him”). Additionally, some of many praises to God for this situation is said such as رَبَّنَا وَلَكَ الْحَمْدُ (Rabbanā wa lakal-ḥamd, meaning “Our Lord, to You belongs all praise"). The takbir is said again and the worshipper moves into prostration.

== Types of prayers ==
In the five daily prayers, sunnah salat (the voluntary, additional prayers) and most other prayers, qiyām is one part of the prayer.

In salat al-Janazah, the Islamic funeral prayer which is part of the Islamic funeral ritual, the entire prayer consists of qiyām.

== Sayings during qiyām ==
Most of the reciting of the Quran that occurs during Islamic prayer is done while in qiyām. The first chapter of the Quran, Al-Fatiha, is recited while standing. Sahih Muslim recorded that Abu Hurayrah said that Muhammad said, «مَنْ صَلَى صَلَاةً لَمْ يَقْرَأْ فِيهَا أُمَّ الْقُرْآنِ فَهِيَ خِدَاجٌ ثَلَاثًا غَيْرُ تَمَامٍ» (Whoever performs any prayer in which he did not read Umm Al-Qur'an, then his prayer is incomplete.)

Additionally, recitations from any other section from the Quran of choice is followed in the first or second raka’ah.

== Position of hands in qiyām ==
Where the hands are placed in qiyām varies among the different Islamic schools and branches. These differences have manifested into the qabd-sadl dispute. Among Sunnis, several hadith indicate that qabd (praying with arms crossed) is desirable, if not obligatory; however, sadl (arms hanging by the sides) is still preferred among many Malikis. The debate predominantly exists in Maliki-practicing areas, such as Northern Nigeria, due to the influence of other Sunni schools.

=== Sunni view ===
==== Hanafi ====
For Hanafis, men put their hands below the navel. Women put their hands on their chest.

==== Maliki ====
Unique among Sunnis (but like Shia and Ibadi Muslims), many Malikis put their hands on the thighs or by their sides. Among those who adhere to this practice, the basis is in the practice of the Medinan community in the generations shortly following Muhammad's time, as recorded by Malik bin Anas and transmitted by him as authoritative. "According to Imam Malik the prayers should be offered with unfolded hands, he considers the folding of hands as undesirable in obligatory prayers and permissible in Nafl prayers.” However, this practice is not universal, with the Maliki scholar Qadi Ayyad, for example, opining in his Qawa'id al-Islam, that the practice is "unsupported by any authentic hadith".

==== Shafi'i ====
Shafi'is put their hands above the navel and under the chest.

==== Hanbali ====
Hanbalis can put their hands either below the navel like Hanafis, or above the navel like Shafi’is.

=== Salafi view ===
Salafis usually place the right hand over the left hand over the chest, although they are not restricted to one particular way, so different Salafis can follow the way of Hanafis, Hanbalis, Shafi'is, and Malikis.

=== Shia view ===
==== Twelver Shia ====
Twelvers put their hands on the thighs or on their side.

==== Zaydi Shia ====
Zaydis place their hands on the thighs or at their sides.

=== Ibadi view ===
Just like Shia Muslims and Maliki Sunnis, Ibadis put their hands on the thighs or on their side.

== Straightening prayer rows ==
A number of ahadith exist regarding the need to straighten the rows when standing during the prayer. For example, the companion Anas relates that Muhammad said: "Stand close together in your rows, keep them near each other and stand neck to neck. By Him in whose hand is my life, I see the devil entering between the gaps as do the small lambs."

Similarly, Abu Umamah relates Muhammad saying: "Straighten your rows, stand shoulder to shoulder, be soft upon your brother and fill the gaps, for the devil enters through the gaps like the small lambs."

Al-Shawkani explains the above which orders to "stand shoulder to shoulder" to mean: "Aligning the body parts with one another so that the shoulders of each person praying are arranged and in line with the shoulders of others. In this way, shoulders and necks will be aligned."

== See also ==
- Ruku
- Sujud
- Sitting in salah
