= Dhuhr =

Second prayer of the day in Islam

Dhuhr (Arabic: صلاة الظهر, also transliterated as Zuhr, Duhr or Thuhr) is one of the five daily mandatory Islamic prayers (salah). It is observed after Fajr and before Asr, between the zenith of noon and sunset, and contains 4 rak'a (units).

On Friday, the Zuhr prayer is replaced or preceded by Friday prayer (jum'a) which is obligatory for Muslim men who are above the age of puberty and meet certain requirements to pray in congregation either in a mosque or with a group of Muslims. The sermon is delivered by the imam.

== Performance ==
The Dhuhr prayer consists of four compulsory (fardh) rak'a. In addition, there is a voluntary Sunnah prayer, although the details of it vary by branch of Islam. In Dhuhr, Al-Fatiha and the additional surah are to be read quietly or in a whisper (israr).

The Hanafi school believes there are four rak'a before the compulsory prayer and two rak'a after the compulsory prayer of confirmed sunnah (sunnah mu'akkadah) prayer. The Hanafi school also believes there are 4 rak'a of non-confirmed sunnah (ghair mu'akkadah) prayer after the compulsory prayer. The Shafi'i and Hanbali schools believe there are two rak'a of confirmed sunnah prayer before the compulsory prayer, and two additional rak'a before and after the compulsory prayer as non-confirmed sunnah prayer. In the Maliki school, there is confirmed sunnah prayer before and after the compulsory prayer. There is no limit to the amount of rak'a for these, but it is recommended (mustahabb) for it to be at least two rak'a, and it is better to pray four rak'a.

== Textual references ==
=== Quran ===
Quran 17:18 mentions "the prayer from the decline of the sun", referencing Dhuhr:

Observe the prayer from the decline of the sun until the darkness of the night and the dawn prayer, for certainly the dawn prayer is witnessed ˹by angels˺.

— Quran 17:78 ("The Clear Quran" translation by Mustafa Khattab)

Some argue that Quran 2:238's "middle prayer" is about Dhuhr. However the predominant view amongst scholars is that it refers to Asr.

Observe the ˹five obligatory˺ prayers—especially the middle prayer—and stand in true devotion to Allah.

— Quran 2:238 ("The Clear Quran" translation by Mustafa Khattab)

=== Hadith ===
Some ahadith claim there are benefits to Dhuhr:

It was narrated from Umm Habibah that: The Prophet (ﷺ) said: "Whoever prays four rak'ahs before Dhuhr and four after, the Fire will not touch him."

— Sunan an-Nasa'i 1817

Abdullah bin As-Sa'ib narrated: "Allah's Messenger would pray four (Rak'ah) after the Zawal of the sun before Dhuhr. He said: 'It is an hour in which the gates of the heavens are opened, and I love that a righteous deed should be raised up for me in it.'"

— Jami` at-Tirmidhi 478

== Timings ==
By school
School	Start time	End time
Sunni Islam	when the Sun is at its zenith and begins to decline.	when shadows are of equal length with their objects; in the Hanafi school, when shadows are twice as large as their objects.
Shia Islam	when the Sun is at its zenith and begins to decline.	when there is enough time to perform only Asr before the sunset.

== See also ==
- Wudu
- Other salah:
  - Fajr prayer (Morning)
  - Asr prayer (Afternoon)
  - Maghrib prayer (Sunset)
  - Isha prayer (Night)
- Friday prayer
- Eid prayers
- Mandaean prayer at noontime
