= Fajr =

First mandatory prayer of the day in Islam

Fajr prayer
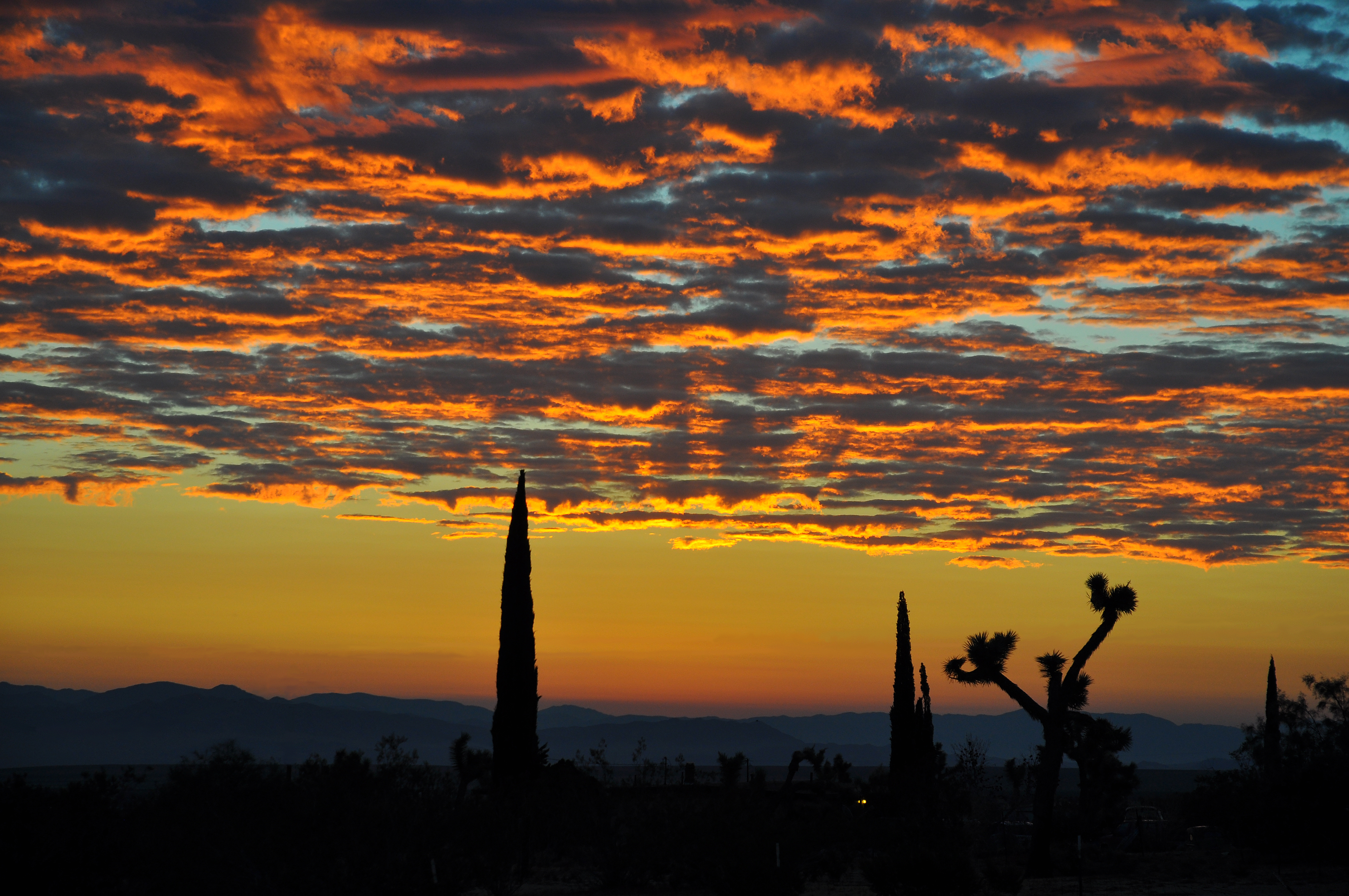
- Official name: صلاة الفجر، صلاة الصبح، صلاة الغداة
- Observed by: Muslims
- Type: Islam
- Significance: Morning prayer
- Begins: Dawn
- Ends: Sunrise
- Frequency: Daily

The Fajr prayer, (Note: Arabic: صَلَاةُ الْفَجْر, romanized: Ṣalāt al-Fajr) alternatively transliterated as Fadjr prayer, and also known as the Subh prayer, (Note: Arabic: صَلَاةُ الْصُبْح, romanized: Ṣalāt al-Ṣubḥ) (Note: Some Malikis do not use them interchangeably, referring to the two-rakat voluntary Sunnah prayer as "Fajr" and the two-rakat mandatory fardh prayer as "Subh") is one of the five daily mandatory Islamic prayers (salah). Consisting of two rak'a ("bows"), it is performed between the break of dawn and sunrise. It is one of two prayers mentioned by name in the Qur'an.

== History and significance ==
During the Islamic holy month of Ramadan, Muslims begin fasting with the Fajr prayer.

Fajr is mentioned twice in the Qur'an. The verse in which Muhammad is commanded to recite at dawn (11:114) is taken as foundational for prescribing the times for prayer.

In Qur'an 17:78, dawn is one of the three times that prayer is to be performed. According to Jalal al-Din al-Suyuti's commentary on angels (Al-Haba'ik fi Akhbar al-Mala'ik), this verse describes the witnessing of dawn prayer by the angels of the day and the night.

Salat al-Duha replaced Fajr as the morning prayer when the five prayers were standardized.

== Performance ==
The most burdensome prayers for the hypocrites are the Isha prayer and the Fajr prayer. If only they knew what (reward) there is in them, they would come to them even if they had to crawl.

— Muhammad, narrated by Ibn Majah in Sunan Ibn Majah

The Fajr prayer consists of two compulsory (fardh) units of prayer (rak'a). In addition, the voluntary sunnah prayer consists of two units of prayer and can be performed before the compulsory prayer units, along with two nafl prayer units.

In Fajr, Al-Fatiha and the additional surah are to be read aloud (jahr), as during Maghrib and Isha. It is commonly performed silently when waking up in the morning.

The prayer includes wudu (ritual purification) and salat (ritual prayer).

== Timings ==
The timings for the prayer are prescribed by the Hadith.

School	Start time	End time
Ahmadi Islam	dawn	a few minutes before sunrise
Quranist Islam	dawn	sunrise
Shia Islam	true dawn	sunrise
Sunni Islam	"the true dawn" (al-fajr al-sadiq) The true dawn is indicated by a white line appearing across the horizon, in contrast to "the false dawn" (al-fajr al-kadhib) shortly before which appears as a vertical line.	sunrise; in the Maliki school, until ifsar or until sunrise with a valid excuse

== See also ==
The other Islamic obligatory prayers in chronological order following the Fajr prayer: Zuhr, Asr, Maghrib, and Isha.

- Sunnah and nafl prayers – optional prayers performed by Muslims, some of which are performed before or after the obligatory prayers
- Shacharit – the Jewish morning prayer
