= Rak'a =

Unit of prayer in Islam equal to one iteration of a specific series of movements

A Rak'a (Arabic: ركعة rakʿah, pronounced [ˈrakʕah] lit. "bow"; plural: ركعات rakaʿāt) is a single iteration of prescribed movements and supplications performed by Muslims as part of the prescribed obligatory prayer known as salah. Each of the five daily prayers observed by Muslims consists of a number of raka'at.

== Procedure ==
After performing the ritual ablution for prayer, a believer must renew their innermost niyyah (intention), to ensure that their prayer is offered solely for the sake of God. The niyyah for the salah is not announced, as it is private. For example, before beginning the prayer, one may intend in their heart to pray a specific number of units, such as four, as part of their prayer (raka'at before you start your prayer.

The raka'ah begins when the worshipper initiates the salah with the words "God is Greater", the takbir (lit. 'the Glorification of God'). Takbir must be said at the start of the Salah or the prayer is invalidated. The individual will observe the standing position while reciting the "Dua al istiftah" followed by the opening chapter of the Qur'an (Al-Fatiha) (Note: reciting the Al-Fatiha is a pillar of prayer. If one forgets to say the Al-Fatiha or makes a major mistake in its Tajweed, then they must redo the prayer from the start) followed by a personal selection of chosen verses or chapters which the worshippers are free to choose to recite for themselves.

The second part of the raka'ah involves the worshipper making another Takbir then ruku, bowing at a 90-degree angle, placing their hands on their knees with their feet kept shoulder-width apart, eyes are meant to be focused in between your feet or around the area and bowing in humble submission as if awaiting God's command. In this position, the words "Glory be to God the most Magnificent" are uttered silently as a form of ritual praise.

The third movement of the raka'ah is to return from bowing to the standing position before, with the praise of God on your tongue, descending into full sujud (prostration on the ground).

In prostration, the worshipper's forehead and nose is flatly placed on the floor with the palms of their hands placed shoulder-width apart to the right and left of their ears.

In this position, the words "Glory be to God the Almighty" are repeated contemplatively as a form of ritual praise. The Islamic prophet Muhammad taught his disciples that "the closest a subject gets to God is when in prostration".

The fourth movement is for the worshipper to return from prostration to a sitting position, with their legs folded flat beneath their body.

This concludes one unit of prayer, known in Arabic as a raka'ah, and is followed by either standing for a second raka'ah if the prayer requires it or by ending the salah with taslim.

Although not part of a single raka'ah, the conclusion of the salah takes place in the sitting position.

=== Components ===
- Takbir
- Standing in salah
- Supplications or iftitah (Note: Only performed in the first rakat of the prayer and only performed by some schools.)
- Recitation of al-Fatiha
- Recitation of another surah
- Ruku
- Straightening up from ruku
- Sujud (prostration)
- Rising from sujud
- The second sujud
- Sitting in prayers (Note: Only first half of the Tashahhud is recited in the second rakat in a 4- or 3-rakat prayer, e.g. the afternoon prayer or the evening prayer, but all of it is recited in the last rakat of any prayer.)
- Taslim (salutation) (Note: Only performed in the last rakat of a prayer.)

== Daily prayers ==
The five daily prayers for Sunnites are each performed with a number of obligatory Rak'at (called fard).

- The Fajr prayer (dawn prayer) has 2 Rak'at.
- The Zuhr prayer (midday or early afternoon prayer) has 4 Rak'at.
- The Asr prayer (late afternoon prayer) has 4 Rak'at.
- The Maghrib prayer (dusk prayer) has 3 Rak'at.
- The Isha prayer (night prayer) has 4 Rak'at.

There is a slight variation of the midday prayer on Fridays; Friday prayer has two Rak'at instead of the normal four of the Zuhr prayer, if it is read as part of a congregational prayer called the Friday prayer (Jummah prayer). (Note: Attendance at a mosque is optional for women and they can choose to pray the midday prayer at home.) The Friday prayer is preceded by a sermon, usually delivered by the imam. The prayer units remain the same.

== See also ==
- Dhikr
- Tasbih
- Sign prayer
