= Sitting in salah =

Sitting or kneeling for Islamic prayer (salah)

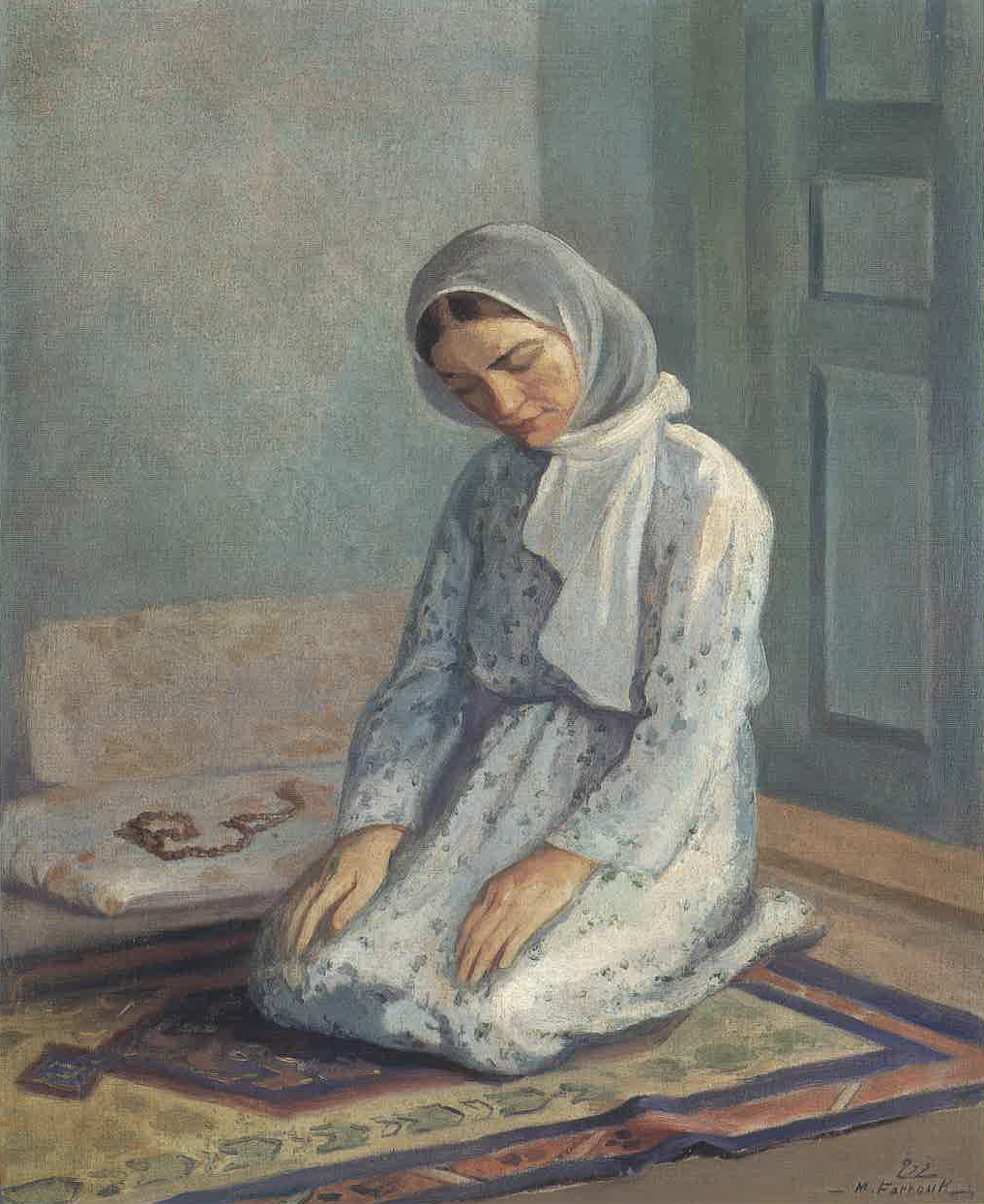
The Noon Prayer by Moustafa Farroukh (1950)

Sitting or kneeling (Arabic: جِلسة, romanized: jilsh and Arabic: قعدة, romanized: qaʻdah, also Arabic: جلوس, romanized: julūs and Arabic: قعود, romanized: qaʻūd) is an integral part of salah, or Islamic prayer, along with bowing (ruku' and sujud).

== Manners of sitting or kneeling ==
Three styles of sitting/kneeling have been reported in the hadiths (accounts of the prophet Muhammad's traditions):

- Kneeling and resting the buttocks on the heels (similar to seiza or kiza style posture)
- Resting the buttocks on the left heel while kneeling, with the right heel propped up (the ball of the foot touching the floor and toes flexed forward)
- Sitting with both legs off to the right and the left side of the hips on the floor, the right heel may remain lowered on the floor or propped up (similar to yokozuwari style sitting). This is implemented in the climax of the prayer.

It is sunnah to bend the toes towards Qibla.

== Overview ==
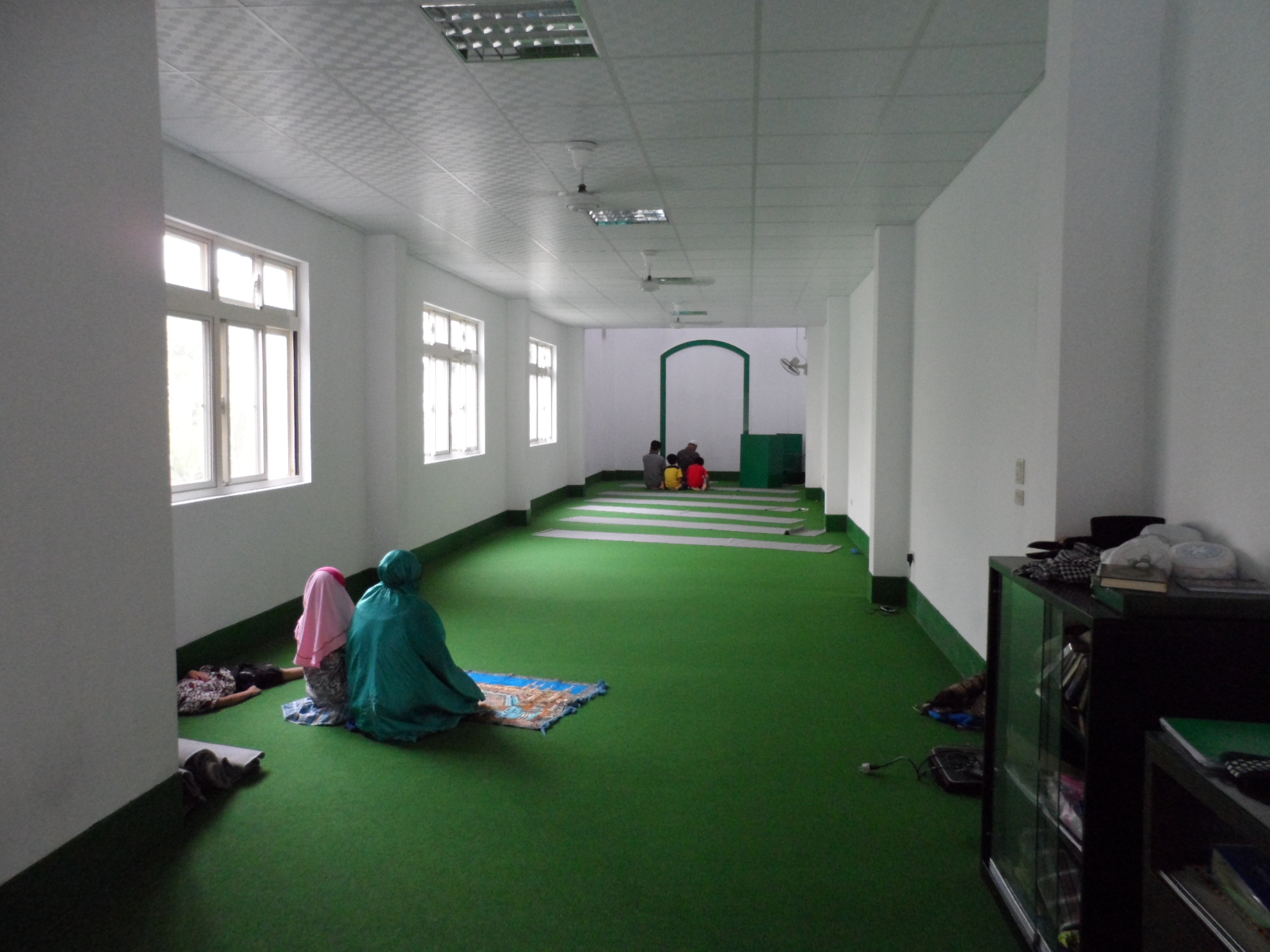
Women and girls kneeling in prayer at At-Taqwa Mosque in Taiwan.

There can be two occasions of sitting in a regular raka'ah. One is after the first prostration and the other is after the second prostration, sometimes referred to as the tashahhud.

The first two styles of kneeling are used alternatively by Muslims after the first prostration and during the first tashahhud. The third style of sitting is used during the final tashahhud while the index finger is pointed towards the qibla, which is the direction of Mecca.

In the last raka’ah, the prayer is concluded in sitting position by saying the taslim or peace greeting first towards the right and then towards the left.

== Sayings ==
The Tashahhud, a prayer containing the Islamic testimony of absolute monotheism and Muhammad's divine apostlehood/messengerhood, is recited. Among Sunnis, the prayer is also known as "at-Tahiyyat" by the incipit and includes affirmation of God as the sole object of all worship and supplications for the Prophet and all "righteous servants of God".

In the Shia version, according to Ayatullah Sistani, is "Ash hadu an la ilaha illal lahu wahdahu la sharika lah, wa ash hadu anna Muhammadan 'Abduhu wa Rasuluh, Alla humma salli 'ala Muhammadin wa aleh Muhammad". And it will be sufficient if one recited the tashahhud this way: Ash hadu an la ilaha illal lahu was ash hadu anna Muhammadan Sallal lahu Alayhi Wa Aalihi Abduhu Wa rasuluh.

=== Salawat ===
The tashahhud is accompanied with a recommended salawat in the final sitting:

اللَّهُمَّ صَلِّ عَلَى مُحَمَّدٍ وَعَلَى آلِ مُحَمَّدٍ، كَمَا صَلَّيْتَ عَلَى إِبْرَاهِيمَ وَعَلَى آلِ إِبْرَاهِيم، إِنَّكَ حَمِيدٌ مَجِيدٌ، اللَّهُمَّ بَارِكَ عَلَى مُحَمَّدٍ وَعَلَى آلِ مُحَمَّدٍ كَمَا بَارَكْتَ عَلَى إِبْرَاهِيمَ وَعَلَى آلِ إِبْرَاهِيمَ، إِنَّكَ حَمِيدٌ مَجِيدٌ
allāhumma ṣalli ʿalā muḥammadi(n)-w̃-w̃a-ʿalā āli muḥammadin kamā ṣallayta ʿalā ibrāhīma wa-ʿalā āli ibrāhīma innaka ḥamīdu(n)-m-majīd(un), allāhumma bārika ʿalā muḥammadi(n)-w̃-w̃a-ʿalā āli muḥammadin kamā bārakta ʿalā ibrāhīma wa-ʿalā āli ibrāhīma innaka ḥamīdu(n)-m-majīd(un)
"O God, salute unto Muhammad and unto the family of Muhammad as thou saluted unto Abraham and unto the family of Abraham. Verily thou art the Most Praiseworthy, the Most Exalted; O God, bless unto Muhammad and unto the family of Muhammad as thou blest unto Abraham and unto the family of Abraham. Verily thou art the Most Praiseworthy, the Most Exalted."

The wording may vary depending on the various authentic narrations and preferences in each Fiqh school of thought.

The greetings in the Shia version, according to Ayatullah Sistani, is "Assalamu 'alayka ayyuhan Nabiyyu wa rahmatullahi wa barakatuh. Assalamu Alaykum." Alternatively, "Assalamu Alayna Wa Ala Ibadi llahis Salihin. Assalamu Alaykum."

== See also ==
- Seiza
- Qiyam
- Ruku'
- Sujud
