= Sohaib Sultan =

American Muslim chaplain (1980–2021)

Sohaib Nazeer Sultan (August 26, 1980 – April 16, 2021) was an American clergy person, and the Muslim chaplain at Princeton University. He was one of the first college Muslim chaplains in the country. He was born in North Carolina and raised in Indiana.

== Education ==
Sultan studied Islamic chaplaincy, Islamic studies, and Christian-Muslim relations at the Hartford International University for Religion and Peace, and graduated from the Hartford Theological Seminary in 2002.

== Career ==
In 2005, Sultan became the first Muslim Fellow in the Chaplain's office of Yale University and went on to serve as Muslim chaplain for Trinity College and Wesleyan University. In 2008, he became the full-time Muslim chaplain at Princeton.

He was a public lecturer and writer on Islam, Muslim culture, and Muslim-Western relations, occasionally blogging on the Huffington Post Religion section. He was the author of The Koran for Dummies (2004), The Qur’an and Sayings of Prophet Muhammad: Selection Annotated and Explained (2007). Additionally, he frequently delivered Islamic Friday sermons, with his last one being in March 2021.

== Death ==
He was diagnosed with stage 4 bile duct cancer, and died on April 16, 2021. His funeral and burial were held the next day.

His book, An American Muslim Guide to the Art of Islamic Preaching was published posthumously in 2023 with a foreword and edits from Martin Nguyen. The book was originally Sultan's master's degree thesis.
