= Salah =

Form of daily obligatory prayer in Islam

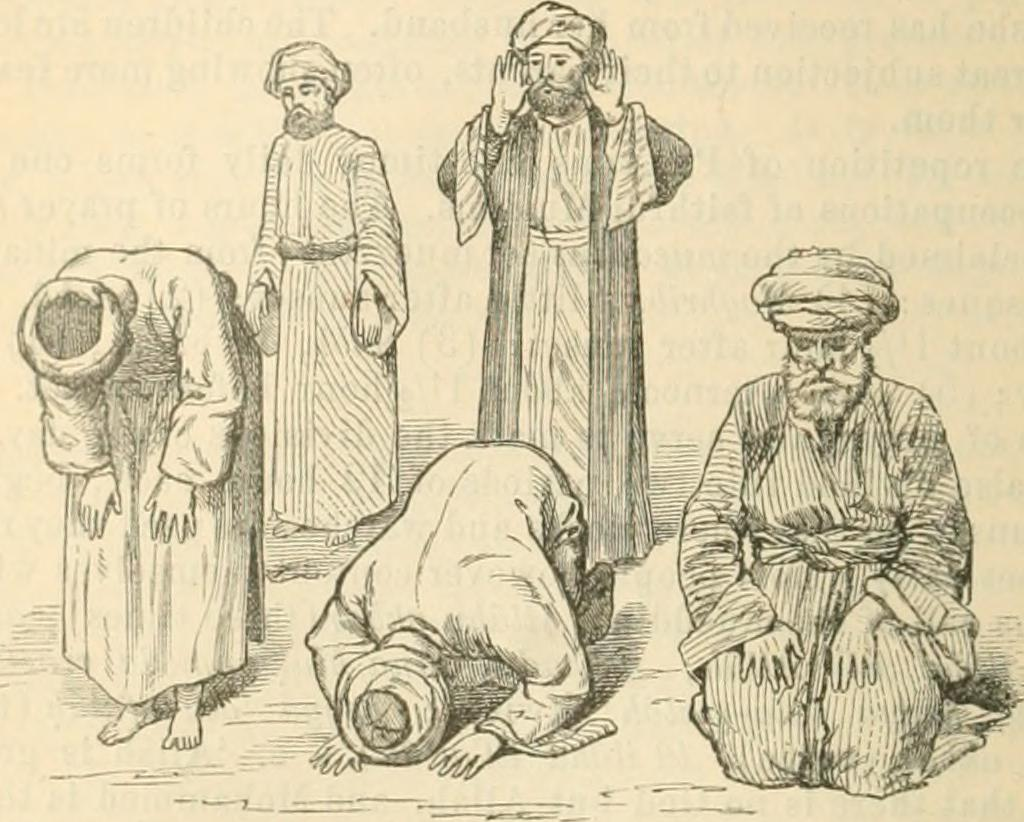
Various prescribed movements in Salah, which collectively constitute a rak'ah. From left to right: rukū', qiyām/i'tidal, sujūd, takbīr, and qu'ūd/julūs.

Salah (Arabic: ٱلصَّلَاةُ, romanized: aṣ-Ṣalāh, also spelled salat or solat; see etymology), also known as namaz in the Persosphere (Persian: نماز, romanized: namāz), is the practice of formal worship in Islam, consisting of a series of obligatory ritual prayers performed during prescribed times daily. These prayers, which consist of units known as rak'ah, include a specific set of physical postures, recitation from the Quran, and prayers from the Sunnah, and are performed while facing the direction towards the Kaaba in Mecca (qibla). The number of rak'ah varies depending on the specific prayer. Variations in practice are observed among adherents of different madhahib (schools of Islamic jurisprudence). The term salah may denote worship in general or specifically refer to the obligatory prayers performed by Muslims five times daily, or in some traditions, three times daily.

The obligatory prayers play an integral role in the Islamic faith, and are regarded as the second and most important, after shahada, of the Five Pillars for Sunnis, one of the Ancillaries for Twelver Shias, and one of the Seven Pillars for Ismailis. In addition, supererogatory salah, such as optional (sunnah) and free to do (nafl) prayers may be performed at any time, subject to certain restrictions. Wudu, an act of ritual purification, is required prior to performing salah. Prayers may be conducted individually or in congregation, with certain prayers, such as the Friday and Eid prayers, requiring a collective setting and a sermon (khutbah). Some concessions are made for Muslims who are physically unable to perform the salah in its original form, or are travelling.

In early Islam, the direction of prayer (qibla) according to tradition was toward the Al-Aqsa Mosque in Jerusalem, before being changed to face the Kaaba; a result of a Quranic verse revelation to Muhammad, the verses 144, 149, and 150 of the al-Baqarah chapter of the Quran, each of which contains a command to "turn your face toward the Sacred Mosque" (fawalli wajhaka shatr al-Masjid il-Haram).

== Etymology and other names ==
The Arabic word salah (Arabic: صلاة, romanized: ṣalāh, pronounced [sˤa.laːh] or Arabic pronunciation: [sˤə.ɫaːt]) means 'prayer'. The word is used primarily by English speakers to refer to the five daily obligatory prayers. Similar terms are used to refer to the prayer in Thailand, Malaysia, Brunei and Indonesia (using Malay: solat), Somalia, Tanzania, and by some Swahili speakers. In the pre-Islamic period, Christian and Jewish monks along the Syrian frontier and in Northern Arabia used the word צלותא (Slōthā veya Tslotha) to refer to the acts of worship and psalm recitations they performed by bowing and rising at specific times of the day. Early Arabic adopted this term and transformed it into the form "salat."

However, translating the word in this manner created theological problems in the translation of certain Quranic verses —such as "Allah and His angels send blessings upon the Prophet" Al-Aḥzāb-56 —leading to a search for alternative meanings for the word. Some have suggested that salah derives from the triliteral root و-ص-ل (w-ṣ-l) which means 'linking things together', relating it to the obligatory prayers in the sense that one connects to Allah through prayer. Following this trail Rashad Khalifa, salah translated it as the 'contact prayer', either because of the physical contact the head makes with the ground during the prostration, or again because the prayer connects the one who performs it to Allah. Another theory suggests the word derives from the triliteral root ص-ل-و (ṣ-l-w), the meaning of which is not agreed upon.

In Iran and regions influenced by Persian culture – particularly the Indo-Persian and Turco-Persian traditions – such as South Asia, Central Asia, China, Russia, Turkey, the Caucasus or the Balkans, the Persian word namaz (Persian: نماز, romanized: namāz) is used to refer to salah. This word originates from the Middle Persian word for 'reverence'.

Among the Mappila Muslims of Kerala, Lakshadweep, and neighbouring regions of Southwest India, the Malayalam words niskāram (Malayalam: നിസ്കാരം) and namaskāram (നമസ്കാരം), derived from the Sanskrit word namaskāra (Sanskrit: नमस्कार, lit. 'making obeisance'), are used instead of salah.

In Southeast Asia, the Malay term sembahyang (lit. 'to worship the Yang [i.e. Allah]') is a commonly used synonym; the prayer rug is a tikar sembahyang, ablution is air sembahyang and so on.

== History ==
Ritual prayers such as salat did not originate from scratch with Islam, nor did they acquire their final form solely through the teachings of Muhammad. Elements integral to the prayer ritual —such as ablution, specific prayer times, orientation toward a focal point (qibla), standing (qiyam), bowing (ruku), prostration (sajdah), recitations of praise (tasbihat), and the raising of hands— were adopted from various religious cultures of the Late Antique Middle East. Some of these elements were subsequently "Islamized" by being fused into a syncretic whole through retrospective narratives attributed to Muhammad.

According to classical Islamic discourse, while early Meccan verses such as Ta-Ha-130 or Hûd-114 point to acts of worship performed at the two ends of the day (morning and evening), a "middle prayer" is mentioned in verse 238 of Surah Al-Baqarah, which dates to the Medinan period; nevertheless, the text of the Quran contains no explicit statement regarding five distinct prayer times. Prior to Islam, the concept of a qibla existed in Judaism, and the practice of ablution was found among the Mandaeans. While ordinary monotheistic Christians practiced morning and evening prayers that included bowing and prostration, the rigorous discipline of prayer involving five or more daily sessions was a form of worship observed on a societal scale in Zoroastrianism, and—on an ascetic level—exclusively within the esoteric Judeo-Christian circles of monastics dedicated to a life of piety.

== Religious significance ==
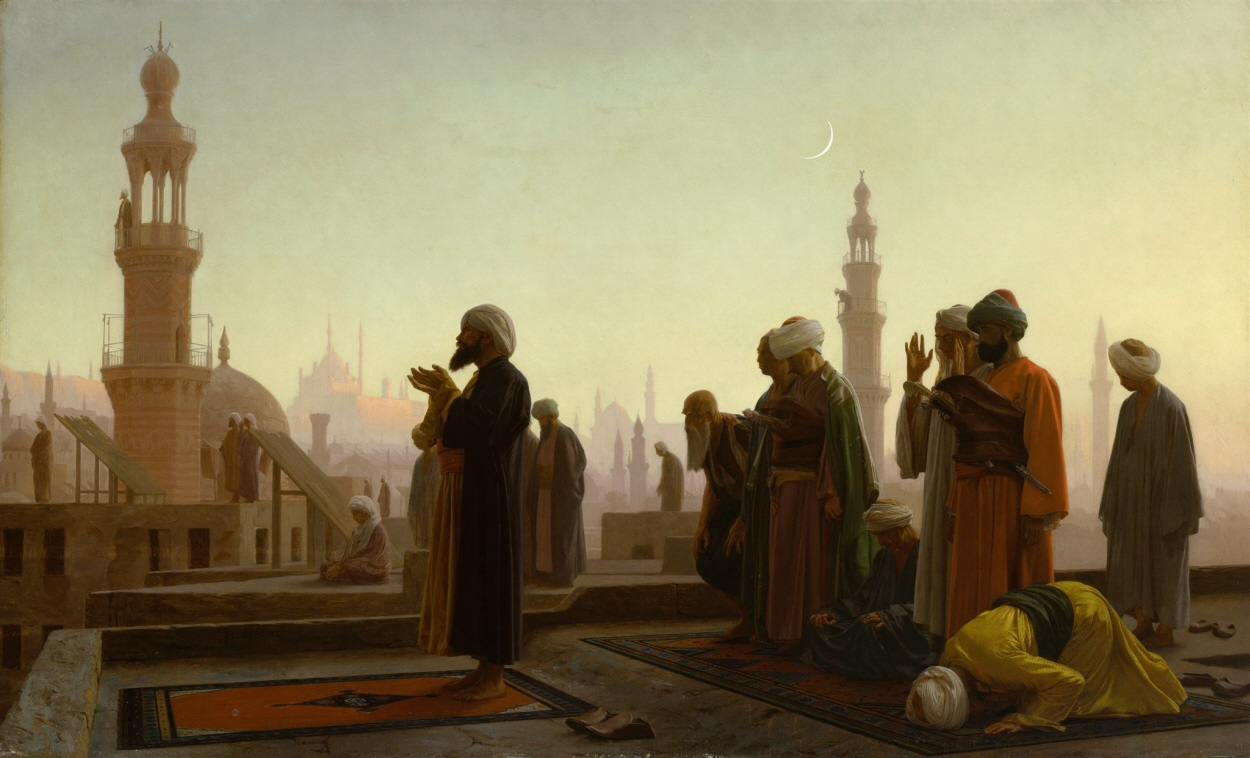
Muslims praying (salah) in 1865 Cairo by Jean-Léon Gérôme

The word salah is mentioned 83 times in the Quran as a noun.

Islamic jurisprudence (fiqh) divides human actions into five categories, known as "the five rulings" (al-aḥkām al-khamsa). Acts of worship are classified accordingly: mandatory (farḍ or wājib), recommended (mandūb or mustaḥabb), neutral (mubāḥ), reprehensible (makrūh), and forbidden (ḥarām). Salah is generally classified into obligatory or mandatory (fard) prayers and supererogatory prayers, the latter being further divided into Sunnah prayers and Nafl prayers.

Hanafi fiqh does not consider both terms as synonymous and makes a distinction between "fard" and "wajib"; In Hanafi fiqh, two conditions are required to impose the fard rule. 1. Nass, (only verses of the Qur'an can be accepted as evidence here, not hadiths) 2.The expression of the text referring to the subject must be clear and precise enough not to allow other interpretations. The term wajib is used for situations that do not meet the second of these conditions. However, this understanding may not be sufficient to explain every situation. For example, Hanafis accept 5 daily prayers as fard. However, some religious groups such as Quranists and Shiites, (Note: Shiite Ja'farism seeks to counterbalance the oppressive Sunni paradigm through a formula of five daily prayers performed at three separate times) who do not doubt that the Quran existing today is a religious source, infer from the same verses that it is clearly ordered to pray two or three times, not five times. In addition, in religious literature, wajib is widely used for all kinds of religious requirements, without expressing any fiqh definition.

According to riwāya, prayer is held to be extremely important in Islam, and according to all four of the madhabs, those who have a disdain towards prayer are no longer seen as Muslims.

While some sects claimed that those killed in this way remained Muslims, others claimed that they had apostatized from the religion. In this case, Islamic duties could not be made for their funerals, they would not be buried in Muslim cemeteries, and their heirs could not claim inheritance rights from the property they left behind, and would be public property. However, even if today's dominant understanding defines the abandonment of worship as sinfulness, does not approve of giving worldly punishment for them. However, in sharia governments, their testimony against a devout Muslim may not be accepted, they may be humiliated and barred from certain positions because of this tag. In practice, since early on in Islamic history, criminal cases were usually handled by ruler-administered courts or local police using procedures which were only loosely related to Sharia.

In sermon language, the main purpose of the salah is given as acting as a means of communication with Allah. Other emphases include cleansing the heart, getting closer to God, and strengthening faith. It is believed that the soul requires prayer and closeness to Allah to stay sustained and healthy, and that prayer spiritually sustains the human soul, just as food provides nourishment to the physical body. Tafsir (exegesis) of the Quran can give four reasons for the observation of salah. First, in order to commend God, Allah's servants, together with the angels, do salah ("blessing, salutations"). (Note: Quran, 33:43) Second, salah is done involuntarily by all beings in creation, in the sense that they are always in contact with Allah by virtue of him creating and sustaining them. (Note: Quran, 24:41) Third, Muslims voluntarily offer salah to reveal that it is the particular form of worship that belongs to the prophets. (Note: Quran, 21:71–73) Fourth, salah is described as the second pillar of Islam.

== Performing salah ==
There is consensus on the vast majority of the major details of the salah, but there are different views on some of the more intricate details. A Muslim is required to perform Wudu (ablution) before performing salah, and making the niyyah (intention) is a prerequisite for all deeds in Islam, including salah. Some schools of Islamic jurisprudence hold that intending to pray suffices in the heart, and some require that the intention be spoken, usually under the breath. The purpose of making the niyyah is to differentiate salah from ordinary routine actions, marking it as an act of worship ('ibāda) rather than a mechanical action ('āda). The person praying begins in a standing position known as Qiyam, although people who find it difficult to do so may begin while sitting or lying on the ground. This is followed by raising the hands to the head and recitation of the takbir, an action known as the Takbirat al-Ihram (Arabic: تكبيرة الإحرام, romanized: Takbīrat al-Iḥrām). The hands are then lowered, and may be clasped on the abdomen (qabd), or hang by one's sides (sadl). A Muslim may not converse, eat, or do things that are otherwise halal after the Takbirat al-Ihram. A Muslim must keep their vision low during prayer, looking at the place where their face will contact the ground during prostration.

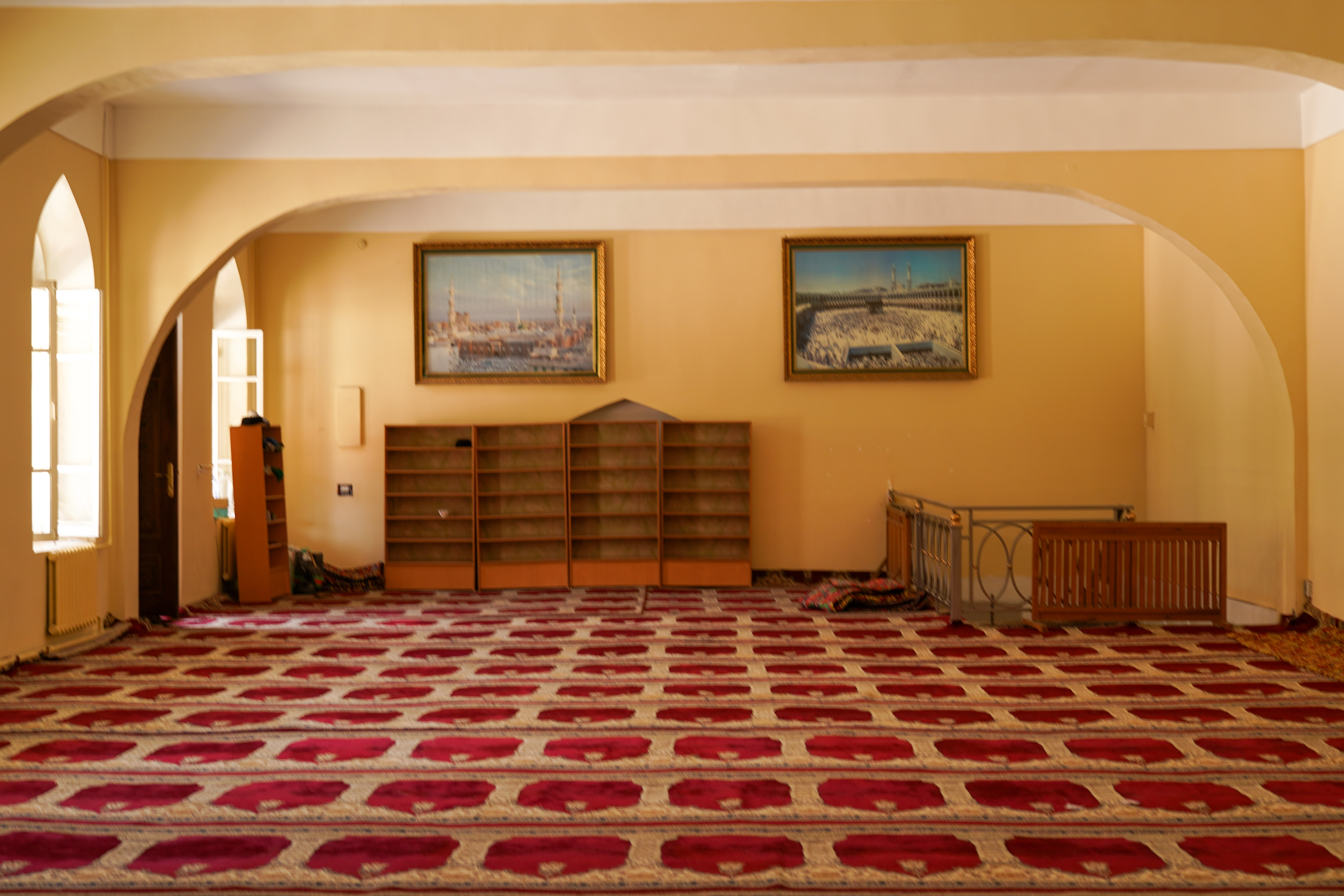
The prayer room in Khonakhan Mosque, Uzbekistan

A prayer may be said before the recitation of the Quran commences. Next, Al-Fatiha, the first chapter of the Quran, is recited. In the first and second rak'a of all prayers, a surah other than Al-Fatiha or part thereof is recited after Al-Fatiha. This is followed by another takbir after which the person praying bows down their waist in a position known as ruku with their hands on their knees (depending on the madhhab, rules may differ for women). While bowing, specific versions of tasbih are uttered once or more. As the worshipper straightens their back, they say the Arabic phrase "سمع الله لمن حمده" (lit. 'Allah hears the one who praises him.'), followed by the phrase "ربنا لك الحمد" (lit. 'Our Lord, all praise is for you.')

Following the recitation of these words of praise, the takbir is recited once again before the worshipper kneels and prostrates with the forehead, nose, knees, palms and toes touching the floor, a position known as sujud. Similar to ruku, specific versions of tasbih are uttered once or more in sujud. The worshipper recites the takbir and rises up to sit briefly, then recites takbir and returns to sujud once again. Lifting the head from the second prostration completes a rak'ah. If this is the second or last rak'a, the worshipper rises up to sit once again and recites the Tashahhud, Salawat, and other prayers. Many Sunni scholars, including Muhammad ibn Abd al-Wahhab and Al-Albani hold that the right index finger should be raised when reciting the prayers in this sitting position, Once the worshipper is done praying in the sitting position in their last rak'a, they perform the taslim, reciting lengthened versions of the Islamic greeting As-salamu alaykum, once while facing the right and another time while facing the left. Taslim represents the end of prayer.

Mistakes and doubts in salah are compensated for by prostrating twice at the end of the prayer, either before or after the taslim depending on the Madhab. These prostrations are known as sujud sahwi (Arabic: سجود السهو, romanized: Sujud as-Sahw).

=== Salah in congregation ===
In Islamic belief, performing salah in congregation is considered to have more social and spiritual benefits than praying alone. The majority of Sunni scholars recommend performing the obligatory salah in congregation without viewing the congregational prayer as an obligation. A minority view exists viewing performing the obligatory salah in congregation as an obligation.

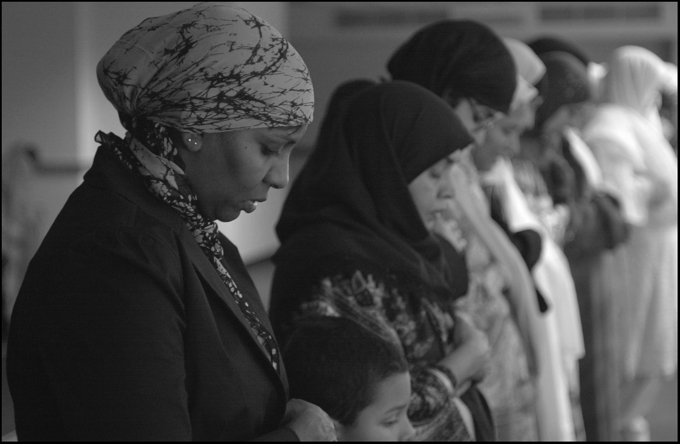
Women performing the Friday prayer at a mosque, Ohio, US

When praying in congregation, the people stand in straight parallel rows behind one person who leads the prayer service, called the imam. The imam must be above the rest in knowledge of the Quran, action, piety, and justness, and should be known to possess faith and commitment the people trust. The prayer is offered just as it is when one prays alone, with the congregation following the imam as they offer their salah. Two people of the same gender praying in congregation would stand beside each other, with the imam on the left and the other person to his right.

When the worshippers consist of men and women combined, a man leads the prayer. In this situation, women are typically forbidden from assuming this role with unanimous agreement within the major schools of Islam. This is disputed by some, partly based on a hadith with controversial interpretations. When the congregation consists entirely of women and/or pre-pubescent children, a woman may lead the prayer. Some configurations allow for rows of men and women to stand side by side separated by a curtain or other barrier, with the primary intention being for there to be no direct line of sight between male and female worshippers.

=== Places and times at which salah is prohibited ===
Salah is not performed in graveyards and bathrooms. It is prohibited from being performed after Fajr prayer until sunrise, during a small period of time around noon, and after Asr prayer until sunset. The prohibition of salah at these times is to prevent the practice of sun worship.

== Obligatory salah ==
=== The daily prayers ===
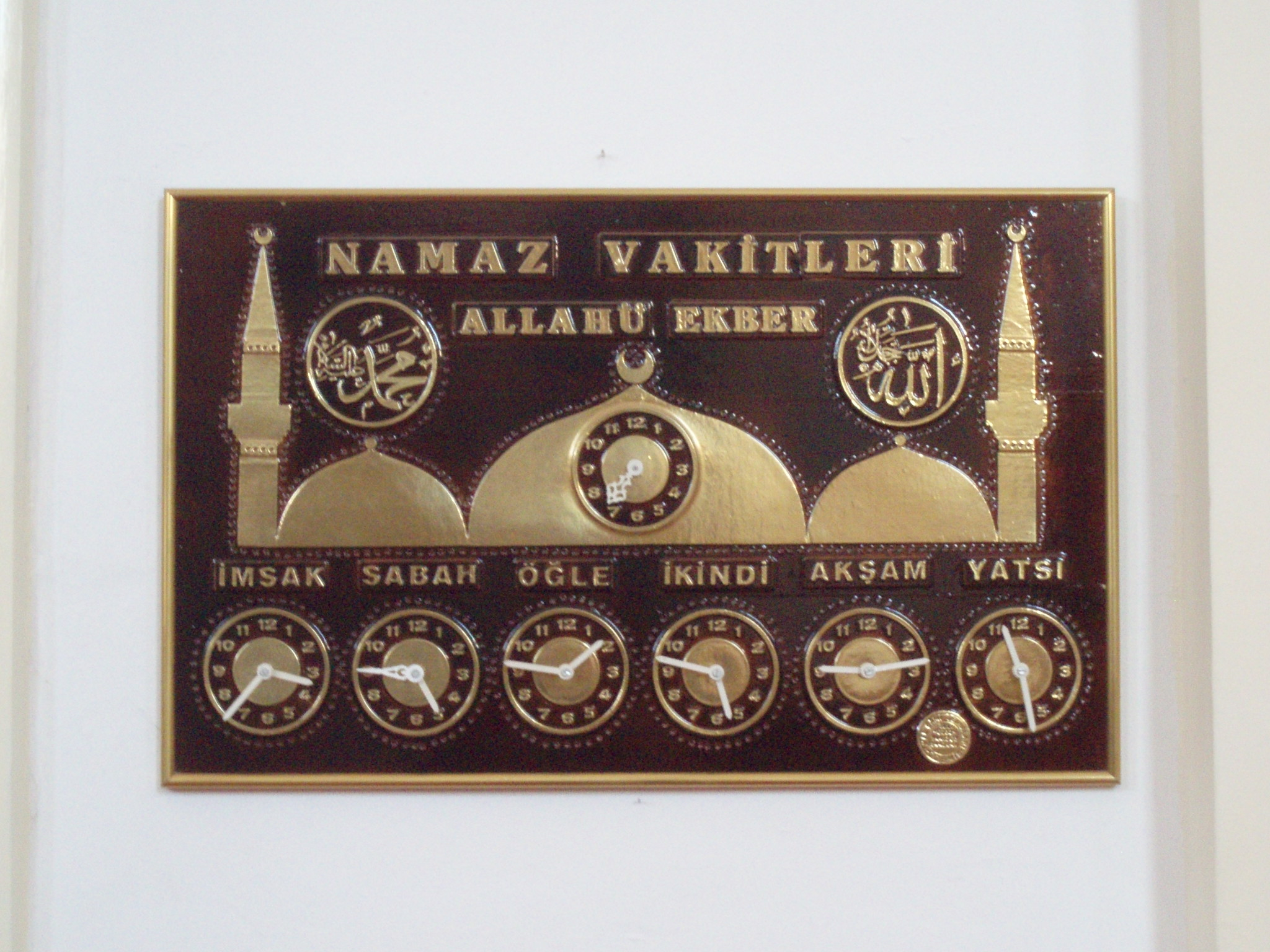
Display showing salah times in a Turkish mosque

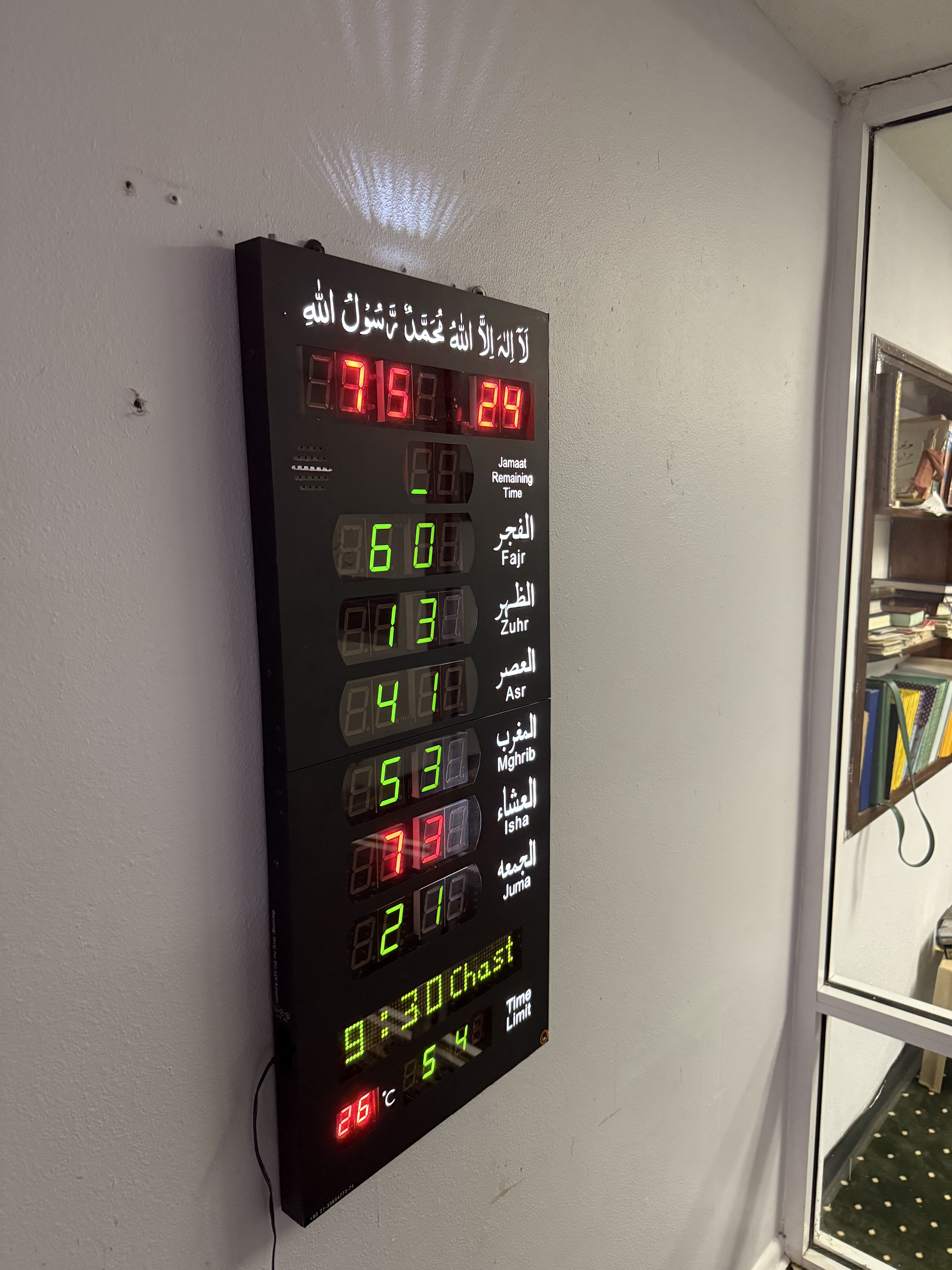
A digital salah clock in an American mosque

The word salah, when used to refer to the Sunni second pillar of Islam or the Shia ancillary of faith, refers to the five obligatory daily prayers. Each of the five prayers has a prescribed time which depends on the position of the Sun in the sky. Given the Islamic day begins at sunset, the first prayer of the day would be Maghrib, performed directly after sunset. It is followed by the Isha salah that is performed during the night, the Fajr salah performed before sunrise, and the Dhuhr and Asr prayers performed in the afternoon.

The five daily prayers must be performed in their prescribed times. However, if extenuating circumstances prevent a Muslim from performing them on time, they must be performed as soon as possible. Several hadith narrations quote the Islamic prophet Muhammad saying that a person who slept past the prescribed time or forgot to perform the obligatory salah must pray it as soon as they remember.

These prayers are considered obligatory upon every adult Muslim, with the exception of those with some physical or mental disabilities, menstruating women, and women experiencing postnatal bleeding. Those who are sick or otherwise physically unable to perform their salah standing may perform them sitting or lying down according to their ability.

Some Muslims pray three times a day, believing the Qur'an mentions three prayers instead of five.

=== Friday and Eid prayers ===
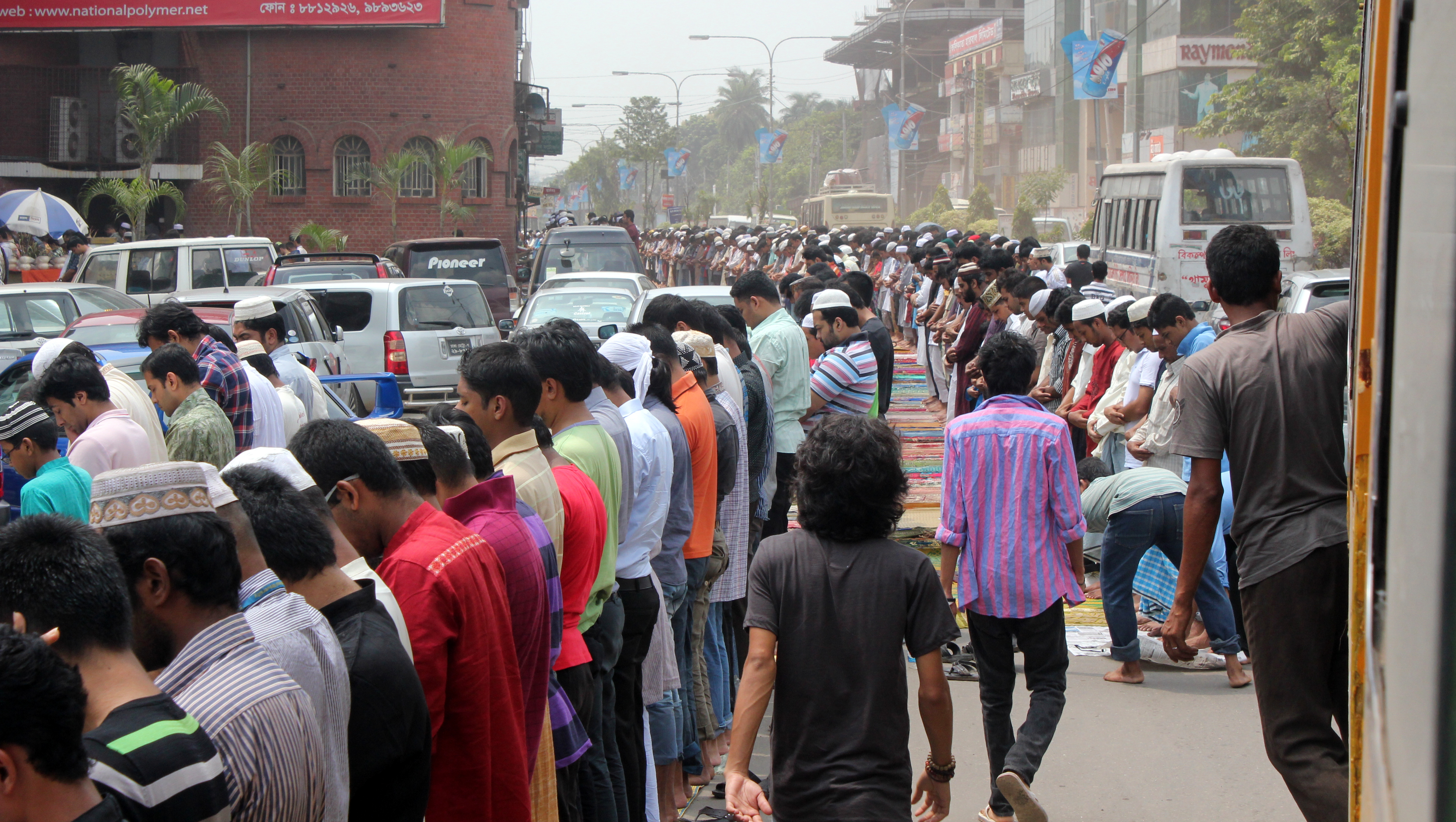
Friday prayer for Muslims in the streets of Dhaka, Bangladesh

In general, Sunnis view the five daily prayers, in addition to the Friday salah, as obligatory. There is a difference of opinion within the Sunni schools of jurisprudence regarding whether the Eid and Witr prayers are obligatory on all Muslims, obligatory only such that a sufficient number of Muslims perform it, or sunnah.

All Sunni schools of jurisprudence view the Friday salah as an obligatory prayer replacing Zuhr on Fridays exclusively. It is obligatory upon men and is to be prayed in congregation, while women have the choice to offer it in congregation or pray Zuhr at home. Preceding the Friday salah, a khutbah (sermon) is delivered by a khatib, after which the 2 rak'a Friday prayer is performed. A minority view within the Sunni schools holds that listening to the khutbah compensates for the spiritual reward of the 2 rak'a that are discounted from the prayer.

The Eid salah is offered on the mornings of Muslim holidays Eid al-Fitr and Eid al-Adha. It consists of 2 rak'a, with extra takbirs pronounced before the beginning of the recitation of the Quran in each. The exact number of extra takbirs is differed upon within the Sunni schools, with the majority opining that seven takbirs are pronounced in the first rak'a and five in the second. The Hanafi school holds that 3 takbirs are to be pronounced in each rak'a. After the prayer, a khutbah is delivered. However, unlike the Friday prayer, the khutbah is not an integral part of the Eid prayer. The prescribed time of the Eid prayer is after that of Fajr and before that of Zuhr.

=== Grouping (jam`) and shortening (qaṣr) prayer times ===
Muslims may pray two obligatory prayers together at the prescribed time of one, a practice known as "grouping" (Arabic: جَمعْ, romanized: jam`). This is restricted to two pairs of salah: the afternoon prayers of Zuhr and Asr, and the night-time prayers of Maghrib and Isha. Within the schools of jurisprudence in Sunni Islam, there is a difference of opinion regarding the range of reasons that permit one to perform jam'. With the exception of the Hanafi school, the other schools of jurisprudence allow one to perform jam' when travelling or when incapable of performing the prayers separately. Hanbalis and members of the Salafi movement allow jam' for a wider range of reasons. Some Salafis ascribing to the Ahl-i Hadith movement also permit jam' without reason while preferring that the prayers be performed separately. The Shia Ja'fari school allows one to perform jam' without reason. Exclusively when traveling more than 90 kilometres (56 mi) at minimum, a Muslim may halven the duration Zuhr, Asr, and Isha prayers from the normal 4 bowings (rak`a) to two in a process known as "shortening" (Arabic: قَصْر, romanized: qaṣr).

== Supererogatory salah ==
Muslims may perform supererogatory salah as an act of worship at any time except the times of prohibition. Such salah is called nafil. Prayers performed by Muhammad consistently, or those that he recommended be performed but are not considered obligatory, are called sunnah prayers.

=== Sunan ar-Rawatib ===
Sunan ar-Rawatib (Arabic: السنن الرواتب, romanized: as-Sunan ar-Rawātib) are regular voluntary prayers performed in association with the five daily obligatory prayers (Salah) in Sunni Islam. They are considered recommended (Sunnah) prayers and are traditionally attributed to the prayer practice of the Islamic prophet Muhammad. These prayers are performed within the prescribed time of the associated obligatory prayer, either before or after it, and are regarded as supplementary to the obligatory acts of worship.

==== Classification ====
In Sunni jurisprudence, Sunan ar-Rawatib are commonly classified into two categories:

- Sunnah Muʾakkadah (emphasized Sunnah): prayers that Muhammad is reported to have regularly performed and consistently observed.
- Sunnah Ghair Muʾakkadah (non-emphasized Sunnah): prayers that Muhammad is reported to have performed occasionally but not consistently.

==== Number and timing ====
According to widely cited Sunni traditions, there are generally twelve units (rakʿahs) of Sunnah Muʾakkadah associated with the five daily prayers:

- 2 rakʿahs before Fajr
- 4 rakʿahs before Dhuhr
- 2 rakʿahs before Asr
- 2 rakʿahs after Maghrib
- 2 rakʿahs after Isha

This enumeration is derived from hadith reports describing the Prophet's regular voluntary prayers in conjunction with the obligatory prayers.

Additional voluntary prayers, such as those performed before Asr or before Maghrib and Isha, are sometimes included under Sunnah Ghair Muʾakkadah by certain scholars, but they are not universally counted among the regular Rawatib prayers.

==== Basis in hadith literature ====
Several hadiths describe the practice and merit of Sunan ar-Rawatib. One well-known narration reports that Muhammad stated that a dwelling in Paradise is promised for those who consistently perform twelve voluntary units of prayer in addition to the obligatory prayers.

==== Practice ====
Sunan ar-Rawatib are voluntary and not legally obligatory; omission does not invalidate the obligatory prayer. Their regular performance, however, is regarded in Sunni tradition as part of normative devotional practice and as a means of emulating the Prophet's prayer routine.

=== Salah before noon ===
Duha salah is a prayer that can be performed after sunrise until noon. (which the time for the Dhuhr Prayer begins) It consists of an even number of rak'a, starting from two and going up to twelve. This prayer is one of 4 sunnah prayers which can be done in congregation.

=== Salah during the night ===
Witr salah (Arabic: صلاة الوتر) is a short prayer generally performed as the last prayer of the night. It consists of an odd number of rak'a, starting from one and going up to eleven, with slight differences between the different schools of jurisprudence. Witr salah often includes the qunut. Within Sunni schools of jurisprudence, the Hanafis view that the Witr salah is obligatory, while the other schools consider it a sunnah salah.

Within Sunni schools of jurisprudence, Tahajjud (Arabic: تَهَجُّد) refers to night-time prayers generally performed after midnight. The prayer includes any number of even rak'a, performed as individual prayers of two rak'a or four. Tahajjud is generally concluded with Witr salah. Shia Muslims offer similar prayers, called Salawat al-Layl (Arabic: صَلَوَات اللَّيل). These are considered highly meritorious, consist of 11 rak'a: 8 nafl (performed as 4 prayers of 2 rak'a each) followed by 3 witr, and can be offered in the same time as Tahajjud.

Tarawih salah (Arabic: صلاة التراويح) is a sunnah prayer performed exclusively during Ramadan by Sunnis. It is performed immediately after the Isha prayer, and consists of 8 to 36 rak'a. Shi'ites hold that Tarawih is a bid'ah initiated by the second Rashidun caliph, Umar. Tarawih is also generally concluded with Witr salah.

=== Eclipse prayers ===
Following the account of Muhammad praying during the solar eclipse that followed his son Ibrahim's death as a strong negation towards the contemporary belief of eclipses as supposedly bad omens, Sunni Muslims perform the solar eclipse prayer (Arabic: صلاة الكسوف, romanized: Ṣalāt al-Kusūf), and the lunar eclipse prayer (Arabic: صلاة الخسوف, romanized: Ṣalāt al-Khusūf) during solar and lunar eclipses, respectively. These consist of 2 rounds (rak`a) with 2 bowings in each round instead of one. It is recommended to lengthen the recitation of the Quran, bowings and prostrations in these prayers.

=== Selection (istikharah) prayers ===
The word istikharah is derived from the root ḵ-y-r (خير) "well-being, goodness, choice, selection". Salat al-Istikhaarah is a prayer offered when a Muslim needs guidance on a particular matter. To say this salah one should pray two rakats of non-obligatory salah to completion. After completion one should request Allah that which on is better. The intention for the salah should be in one's heart to pray two rakats of salah followed by Istikhaarah. The salah can be offered at any of the times where salah is not forbidden. Other prayers include the tahiyyat al-masjid, which Muslims are encouraged to offer these two rakat.

== Differences in practice ==
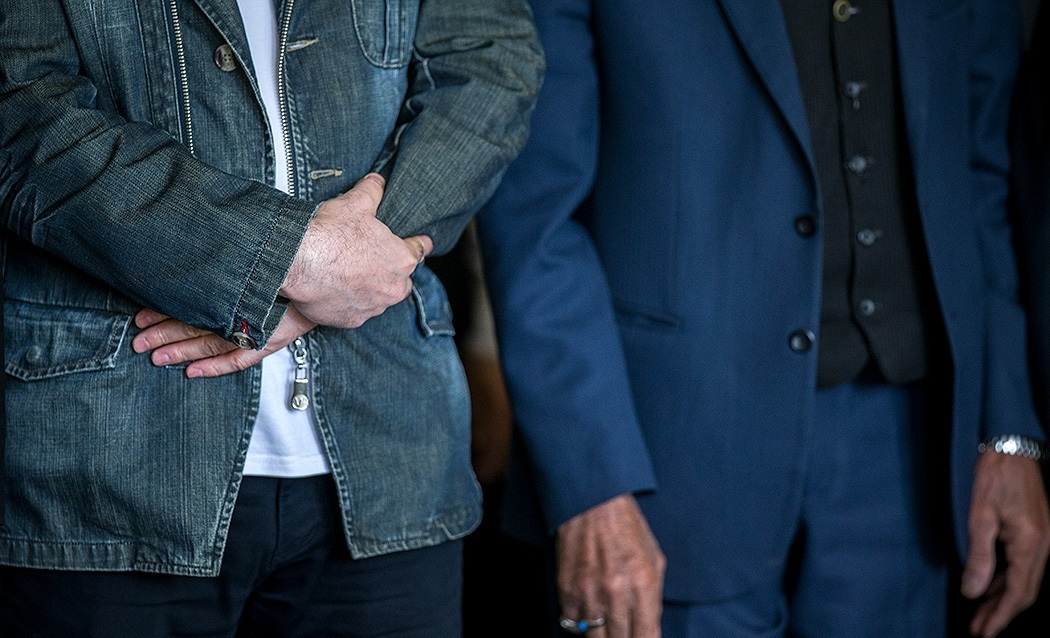
A Sunni Muslim (left) beside a Shia Muslim (right) showing different ways of holding arms during Friday prayer in Iran.

While most Muslims pray five times a day, some Muslims pray three times a day, believing the Qur'an only mentions three prayers. Qur'anists are among those who pray three times a day. Similarly, Shia Ismaili tradition argues that in Mecca, the Islamic prophet Muhammad and the early Muslims first only prayed two times a day, while later in Medina, Muhammad ordered the community to pray three times a day.

Most Muslims believe that Muhammad practiced, taught, and disseminated the salah in the whole community of Muslims and made it part of their life. The practice has, therefore, been concurrently and perpetually practiced by the community in each of the generations. The authority for the basic forms of the salah is neither the hadiths nor the Quran, but rather the consensus of Muslims.

This is not inconsistent with another fact that Muslims have shown diversity in their practice since the earliest days of practice, so the salah practiced by one Muslim may differ from another's in minor details. In some cases the hadith suggest some of this diversity of practice was known of and approved by Muhammad himself.

Key differences between legal schools in Salah
Issue	Ḥanafī	Mālikī	Shāfiʿī	Ḥanbalī
Hands position (qiyam)	Folded below navel	Sides (sadl)	Folded on chest	Folded on chest
Reciting Fātiḥa behind imam	Not required	Required	Required	Required
Witr prayer	Wājib (obligatory)	Sunnah	Sunnah	Sunnah
Qunut in Fajr	Not done	Done	Done	Not done
Asr time start	Shadow = 2x object	Shadow = 1x object	Shadow = 1x object	Shadow = 1x object

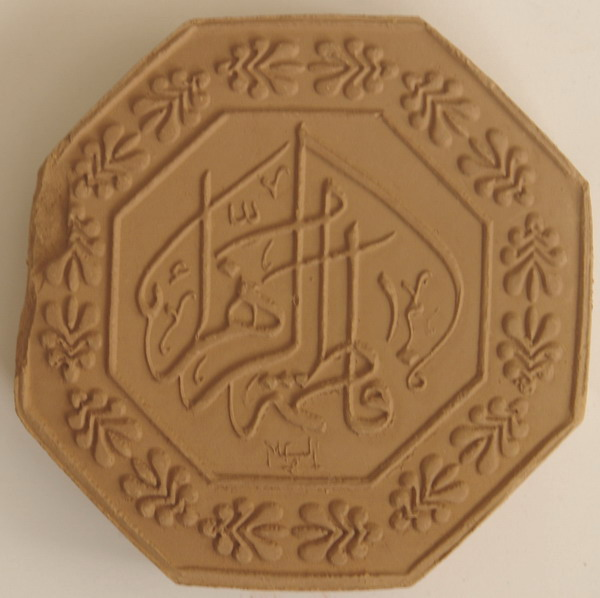
A turbah or mohr is a small piece of soil or clay, often a clay tablet, used during salah to symbolize earth.

Most differences arise because of different interpretations of the Islamic legal sources by the different schools of law (madhhabs) in Sunni Islam, and by different legal traditions within Shia Islam. In the case of ritual worship these differences are generally minor, and should rarely cause dispute.

Common differences, which may vary between schools and gender, include the position of legs, feet, hands and fingers, where the eyes should focus, the minimum amount of recitation, the volume of recitation, and which of the principal elements of the prayer are indispensable, versus recommended or optional.

== See also ==
- Dua
- Sabr (Islamic term)
- Salawat al-Sha'baniyya
- Tasbih
