= Niyyah =

Islamic concept

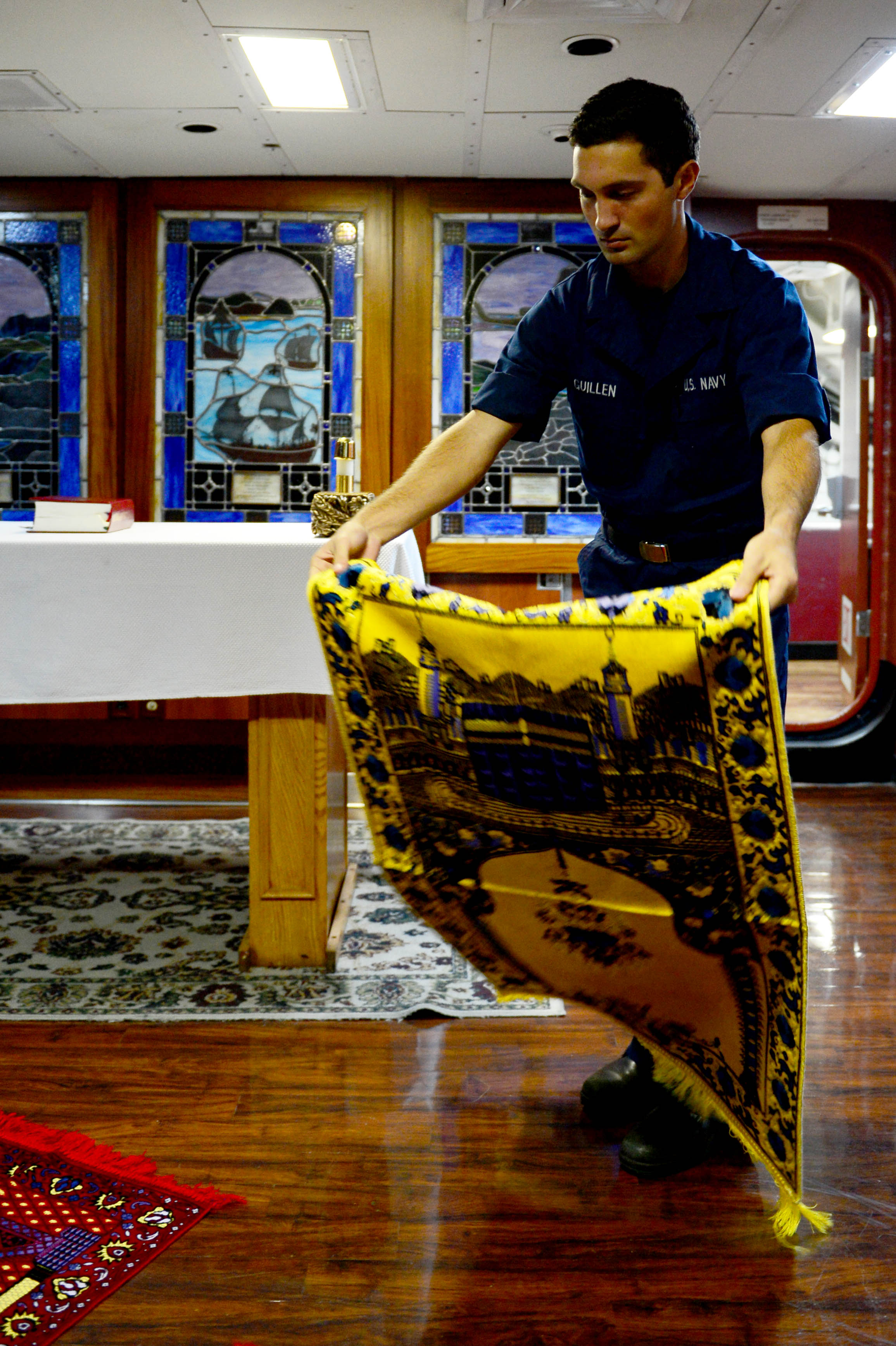
Muslims prepare for Salat by spreading a prayer mat.

Niyyah (Arabic: نِيَّةٌ, variously transliterated niyyah, niyya [ˈnij.jah], "intention") is an Islamic concept: the intention in one's heart to do an act for the sake of God (Allah).

The general Islamic principle of niyyah is laid out in Chapter 33 (Al-Ahzab) of the Quran in Ayat (Verse) 5:

There is no blame on you for what you do by mistake, but (only) for what you do intentionally. And Allah is All-Forgiving, Most Merciful.

According to Ibn Rajab's Commentary on Imam Nawawi's Forty Hadith: Hadith #1, actions are judged according to intentions: "'Umar b. al-Khattab narrated that the Prophet said: Deeds are [a result] only of the intentions [of the actor], and an individual is [rewarded] only according to that which he intends."

Correspondingly, one's niyyah or intention is considered to be one of the most important requirements of ritual prayer. There is some debate as to the necessity of an audible utterance of niyyah. Most scholars agree, however, that as niyyah is spoken from the heart, it does not have to be uttered. Additionally, there is no evidence that the Islamic prophet Muhammad or any of his companions ever uttered a niyyah aloud before prayer.

A Muslim must have niyyah before commencing salat (prayer), and in order to commence the Hajj (pilgrimage to Mecca).

== See also ==
- Kavanah, a similar concept in Judaism
