= Asr =

Third prayer of the day in Islam

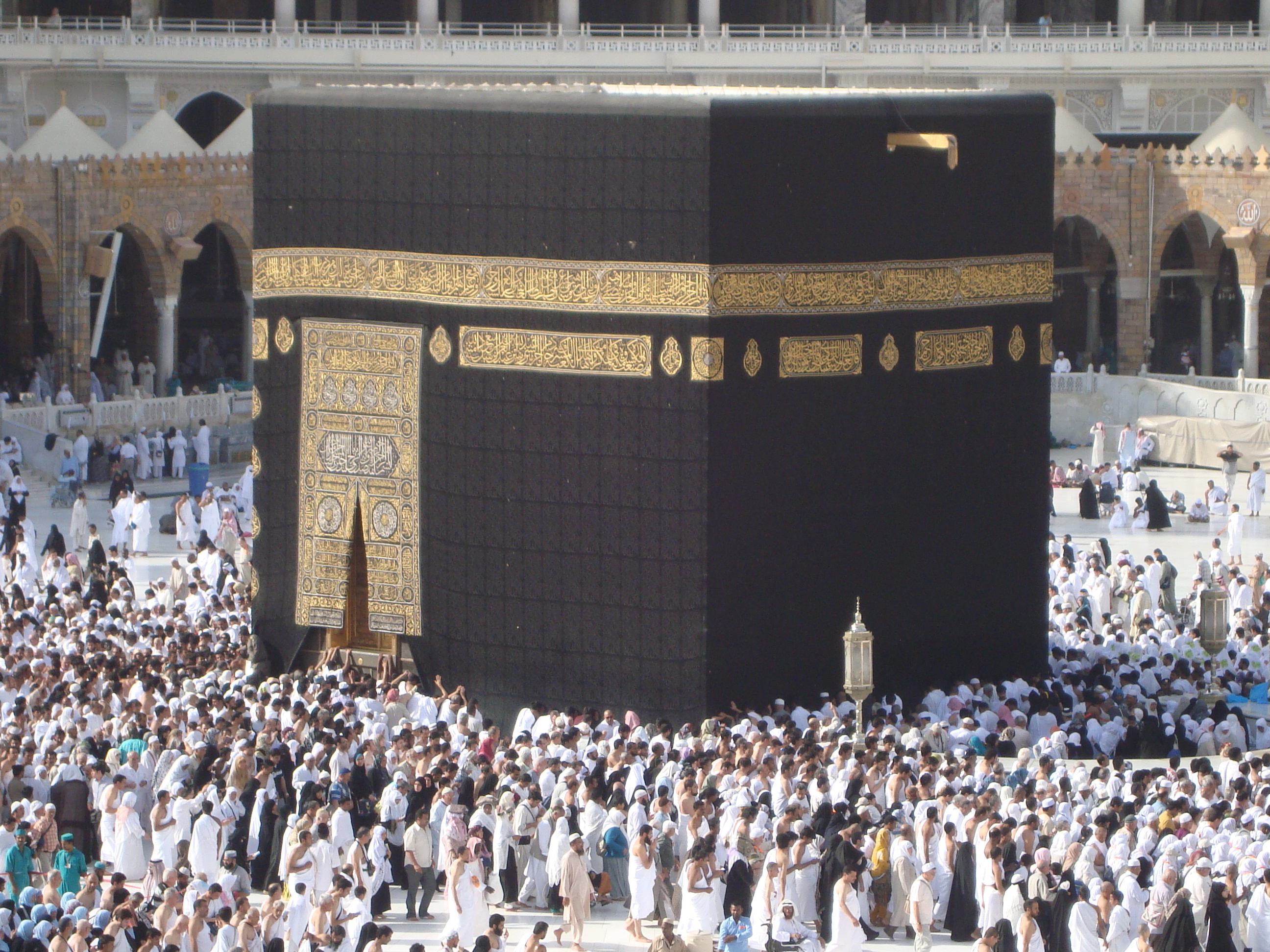
Asr prayer at the Kaaba

Asr (Arabic: صلاة العصر) is one of the five daily mandatory Islamic prayers (salah).

The Asr prayer consists of four obligatory cycles, rak'a. As with Dhuhr, if it is performed in congregation, the imam is silent except when announcing the takbir, i'tidal, and taslim.

The period of Asr begins approximately when the sun is halfway down from noon to sunset (various schools of thought of Islam differ on the starting point; some say that it begins when the shadow of an object equals its actual length plus its shadow during noon, others say that the actual length must be doubled). Asr ends at sunset.

The middle prayer mentioned in the Quran 2:238, is interpreted by Islamic scholars as being either the Asr prayer or the Fajr prayer. Muslims are commanded to protect the middle prayer, meaning that it should be performed at all costs.

Al-Asr is also the title of the 103rd sura of the Qur’ān.

== Name variations ==
| Region/country | Language | Main |
|---|---|---|
| Arab World | Arabic | صلاة العصر (Ṣalāt al-ʿAṣr) |
| Iran, Afghanistan, Tajikistan, Kashmir | Persian, Kashmiri | نماز دیگر، نماز عصر |
| Afghanistan, Pakistan | Pashto | مازدیګر, |
| Pakistan, India | Urdu, Hindi | نماز عصر, अस्र नमाज़ (Asar namaaz) |
| Pakistan | Punjabi | دیگر دی نماز (diigar di namaz) |
| Turkey | Turkish | İkindi namazı |
| Sous (Morocco) | Tashelhit | ⵜⴰⵥⴰⵍⵍⵉⵜ ⵏ ⵜⵓⴽⵣⵉⵏ (Taẓallit n tukzin) |
| Rif (Morocco) | Tarifit | Řɛaṣaa |
| Azerbaijan | Azeri | Əsr namazı |
| Albania, Kosovo | Albanian | Namazi i pasditës |
| Balkans | Bosnian | Ikindija-namaz |
| Bangladesh, India | Bengali | আসর, আছর (Asor) |
| Greater Somalia | Somali | Salaada Casir |
| Malay World | Indonesian, Malaysian, Basa Sunda | Salat asar, Solat asar, Sembahyang Asar |
| Maldives | Dhivehi | އަސުރު ނަމާދު (Asuru namādhu) |
| Uzbekistan | Uzbek | Asr namozi |
| Kazakhstan | Kazakh | Екінті намазы (Ekinti namazy) |
| Tatarstan (Russia) | Tatar | Икенде намазы (İkende namazı) |

== Format ==
The Asr prayer consist of four obligatory rakats, along with two or four sunnah rakats preceding it. Although, according to some madh'habs, it may be reduced to two rakaʿāts when travelling.

== Ja'fari and Zaydi schools of thought ==
According to the Ja'fari and Zaydi schools of thought the time period within which the Asr prayer must be recited is the following:

- Time begins: once the Dhuhr prayer (mid-day daily prayer) has been recited.
- Time ends: at the beginning of the setting of the Sun.

However, it is very important to recite the prayer as soon as the time begins. Letter 52 of Nahj al-Balagha contains instruction of Ali to his governors on the timings of salat, "The Asr prayers can be performed till the sun is still bright and enough time of the day is left for a person to cover a distance of six miles."

== Hanafi, Hanbali, Shafi’i, and Maliki schools of thought ==
The time period within which the Asr prayer must be recited is the following:

- Time begins: The Sunni schools differ on when the time begins. The Maliki, Shafi`i, and Hanbali schools say it is at the time when the length of any object's shadow equals the length of the object itself plus the length of that object's shadow at noon. The dominant opinion in the Hanafi school says it begins when the length of any object's shadow is twice the length of the object plus the length of that object's shadow at noon.
- Time ends: Once the sun has completely set below the horizon. However, it is frowned upon (and sinful in the Maliki school) to delay the prayer without a legitimate excuse to the point of the day in which the sun turns a pale red or orange color as it begins to set, though it would still be considered to have been prayed on time.

The Islamic prophet Muhammad said, "He who observes Al-Bardayn (i.e., Fajr and ‘Asr prayers) will enter Jannah."

In another hadith: Muhammad said 'He who misses his Asr Salat (i.e. performs it after its specified time) is as if he had lost his wife, children and all his wealth.’ (Sahih Muslim)

== See also ==
- Dhikr
- Tasbih
- Mincha
- Other salah:
  - Fajr prayer (Morning)
  - Zuhr prayer (Mid-noon)
  - Maghrib prayer (Sunset)
  - Isha prayer (Night)
