= Maghrib (prayer) =

Fourth prayer of the day in Islam

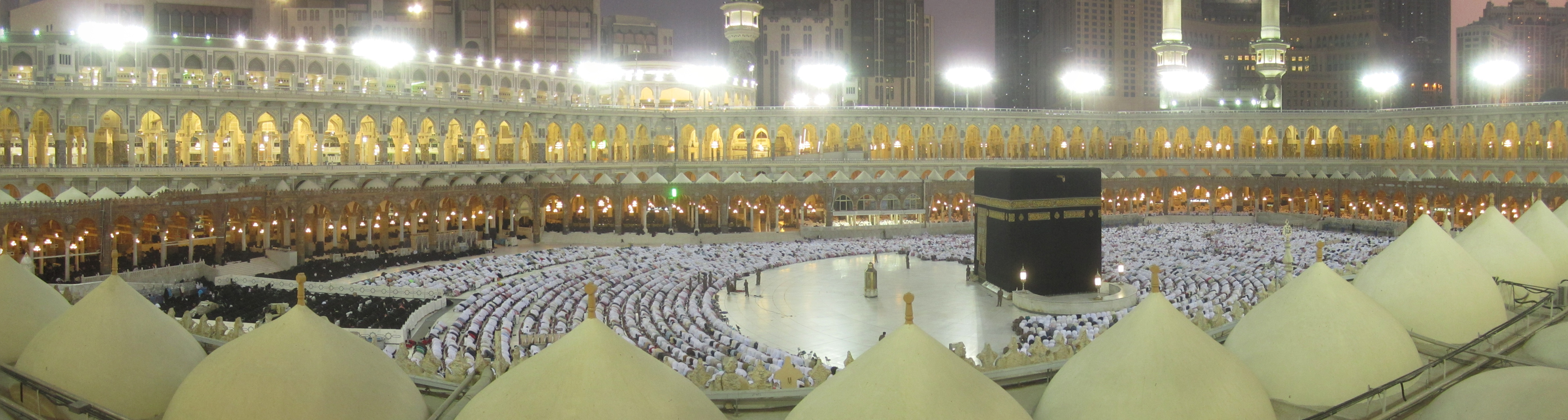
Maghrib prayer at Masjid al-Haram in Saudi Arabia

Maghrib (Arabic: صلاة المغرب) is one of the five mandatory salah (Islamic prayers), and contains three cycles (rak'a). If counted from midnight, it is the fourth one.

According to Shia and Sunni Muslims, the period for Maghrib prayer starts just after sunset, following Asr prayer, and ends at the beginning of night, the start of the Isha prayer. As for Shia Muslims, since they allow Maghrib and Isha prayers to be performed one after another, the period for Maghrib prayer extends until midnight. Sunni Muslims (Except for the Hanafi school) are also permitted to combine Maghrib and Isha prayers if they are traveling and incapable of performing the prayers separately. In this case, the period for Maghrib prayer extends from sunset to dawn, as with Shiites.

The formal daily prayers of Islam comprise different numbers of units, called rakat. The Maghrib prayer has three obligatory (fard) rak'at and two sunnah and two non-obligatory nafls. The first two fard rak'ats are prayed aloud by the Imam in congregation (the person who misses the congregation and is offering prayer alone is not bound to speak the first two rak'ats aloud), and the third is prayed silently.

To be considered valid salat, the formal daily prayers must each be performed within their own prescribed time period. People with a legitimate reason have a longer period during which their prayers will be valid.

The five daily prayers collectively are one pillar of the Five Pillars of Islam, in Sunni Islam, and one of the ten Practices of the Religion (Furū al-Dīn) according to Shia Islam.

== Name variations ==
Language	Main
Albanian	Namazi-i-akshamit, Namaz-i-mbrëmjes
Arabic	صلاة المغرب (Ṣalāh al-Maghrib)
Azerbaijani	Şam namazı
Bashkir	Аҡшам намаҙы (Akşam namazı)
Bengali	মাগরিব (Magrib, Mugrib)
Bosnian, Croatian, Serbian	Akšam-namaz
Hindi	मग़रिब की नमाज़् (Maghrib ki Namaz) नमाज़े मग़रिब (Namaz-e-Maghrib)
Kashmiri	شام نماز (Shaam Namaz)
Kazakh	Ақшам намазы (Aqşam namazy)
Northern Kurdish (Kurmanji)	Nimêja Êvar, Nimêja Mexreb
Malay, Indonesian	Solat/Salat Maghrib, Sembahyang Magrib
Pashto	ماښام لمونځ (Maasham/Maakham Lmunz)
Persian, Dari, Tajik	نماز مغرب (Namaz-e Maghreb) نماز شام (Namaz-e Shaam); Намози Мағриб (Namozi Maghrib); Намози Шом (Namozi Shom)
Punjabi	شام دی نماز (Shaam di namaz) مغرب دی نماز (Maghrab di namaz)
Somali	Salaada Magrib
Central Kurdish (Sorani)	نوێژی مەغریب (Nuêjî Mexrîb)
Tashelhit	ⵜⴰⵥⴰⵍⵍⵉⵜ ⵏ ⵜⵉⵡⵡⵓⵜⵛⵉ (Taẓallit n tiwwutci)
Sindhi	سانجهي جي نماز (Saanjhi ji Nimaz)
Tarifit	Řemɣaạb
Tatar	Ахшам намазы (Axşam namazı)
Turkish	Akşam namazı
Urdu	نمازِ مغرب (Namaaz-e-Maghrib) مغرب کی نماز (Maghrib ki Namaaz)
Uyghur	شام نامىزى (Shaam Namzi)
Uzbek	Shom namozi

== Sunni tradition ==
Time begins

- When the sun has completely set beneath the horizon; immediately after the Asr prayer period ends.

Time ends

- Most scholarly opinions follow the Hanafi school, that Isha'a begins when complete darkness has arrived and the yellow twilight in the sky has disappeared.
- According to a minority opinion in the Maliki school, the prescribed time for Maghrib prayer ends when the red thread has disappeared from the sky. In another opinion of the Shafi'i school, the disappearance of the red thread marks the end of the Period of Necessity. These times can be approximated by using the sun as a measure. When the sun has descended 12 degrees below the horizon, it is approximately equivalent to the disappearance of the red from the sky. For approximating when complete darkness begins, i.e. the disappearance of the white thread from the sky, some astronomers argue that it occurs when the sun has descended 15 degrees below the horizon while others use the safer number of 18 degrees. Astronomical twilight occurs when the sun is between 12 degrees and 18 degrees below the horizon.

== Shia tradition ==
Time begins

- When the redness of the eastern sky, which persists in the east for some time after sunset, disappears from above one's head when one looks vertically upwards.

Time ends

- At midnight. The end of its time is after approximately eleven-and-a-quarter hours have passed from the legal noontime. This is for when one is under normal circumstances. However, in the case of one who was asleep, or forgot to perform the prayer or was coerced by extraordinary circumstances or factors beyond his control or in the case of a woman whose prayer was delayed due to menstruation, the end of the Maghrib prayer time is Fajr.

Despite the relatively long period in which valid prayers can be recited, it is considered important to recite the prayer as soon as the time begins.

Shia doctrine permits the mid-day and afternoon and evening and night prayers to be prayed in succession, i.e. Zuhr can be followed by Asr once the mid-day prayer has been recited and sufficient time has passed, and Maghrib can be followed by Isha'a once the evening prayer has been recited and sufficient time has passed.

During Ramadan, the maghrib prayer marks the end of the fast and is the start of the iftar.

== See also ==
- Other salah:
  - Fajr prayer (Morning)
  - Zuhr prayer (Mid-day)
  - Asr prayer (Afternoon)
  - Isha prayer (Night)
- Maariv – Jewish evening prayer; with same etymology
- Mandaean prayer at evening
