= Ruku =

Position of prayer

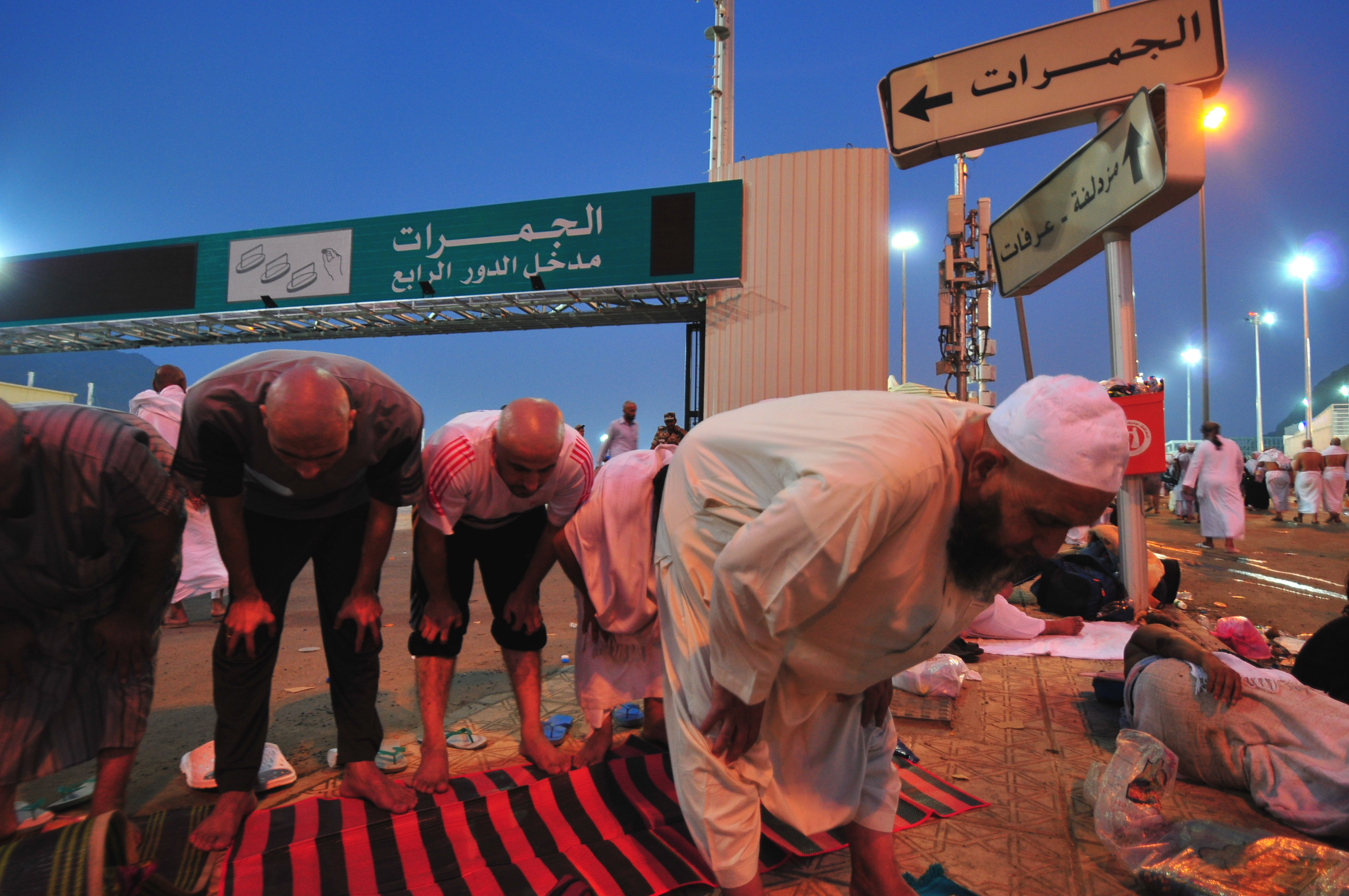
Precants performing ruku

Rukū or Roukuʿ (Arabic: رُكوع, [rʊˈkuːʕ]) is the act of belt-low bowing in standardized prayers, where the backbone should be at rest.

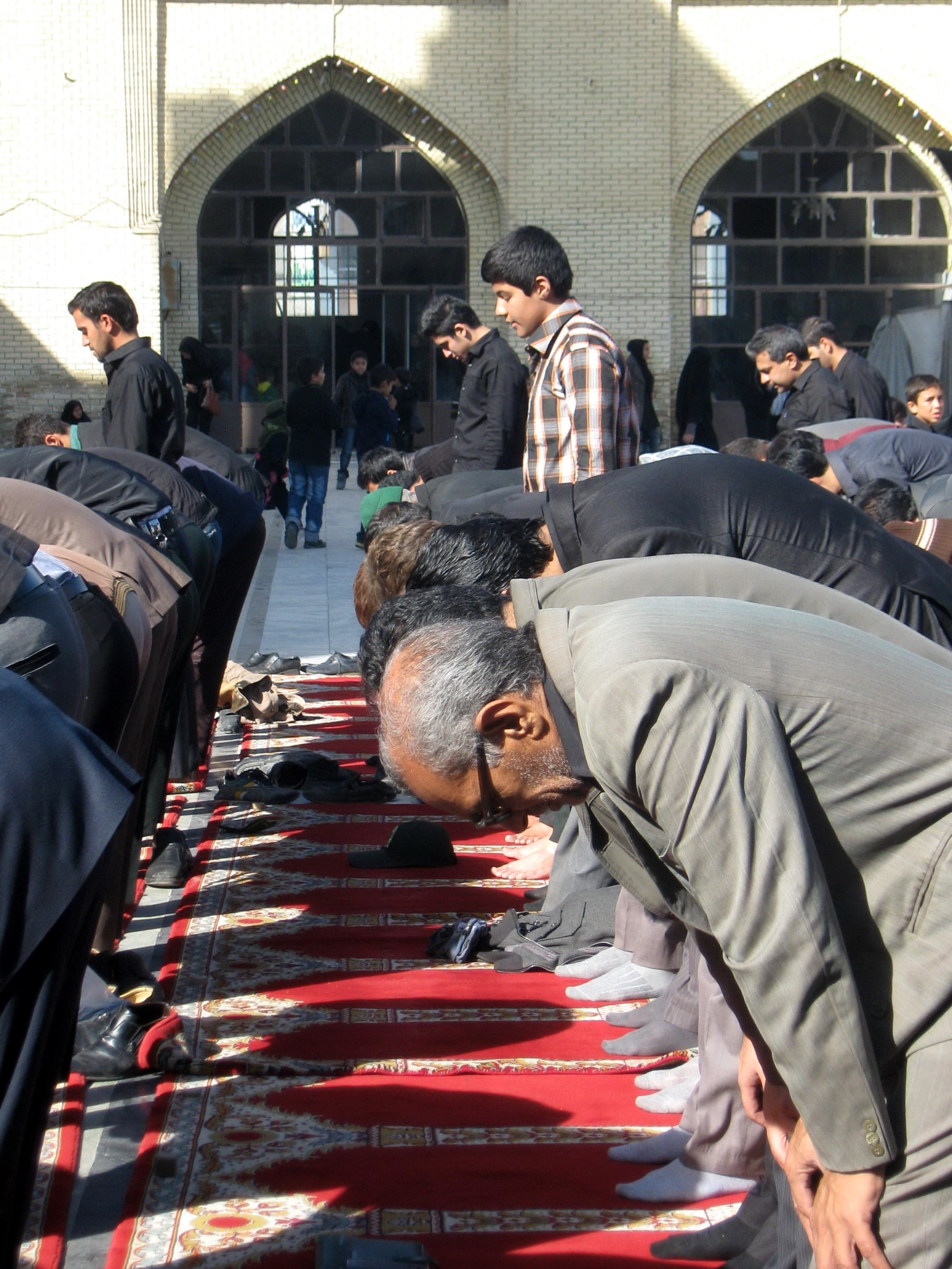
Muslims in rukūʿ

In prayer, it refers to the bowing at the waist from standing (qiyām) on the completion of recitation (qiraʾat) of a portion of the Qur'an in Islamic formal prayers (salah). There is a consensus on the obligatory nature of the rukūʿ. The position of rukūʿ is established by bending over till the hands are on the knees and remaining in that position until one attains a relaxed state while glorifying God (سُبْحَانَ رَبِّيَ الْعَظِيم subḥāna rabbiya l-ʿaẓīm, "Glory be to my Lord, the Most Magnificent!") thrice or more in odd number of times.

In Al-Ghazali's book Inner Dimensions of Islamic Worship, he wrote about the rukūʿ by saying:

Bowing (rukūʿ) and prostration (sujūd) are accompanied by a renewed affirmation of the supreme greatness of Allah. In bowing you renew your submissiveness and humility, striving to refine your inner feeling through a fresh awareness of your own importance and insignificance before the might and grandeur of your Lord. To confirm this, you seek the aid of your tongue, glorifying your Lord and testifying repeatedly to His supreme majesty, both inwardly and outwardly.

== See also ==
- Raka'ah
- Poyasny, bowing in the Eastern Orthodox Church, which originate from Jewish bowing
- Saikeirei
- Rafʿ al-Yadayn
