= Malika Rural Municipality, Gulmi =

Malika (RM) मालिका गाउँपालिका
- Rural Municipality
- Location Malika (RM) (Nepal)
- Coordinates: 28.22°N 83.13°E
- Country: Nepal
- Province: Lumbini
- District: Gulmi
- Wards: 8

Area
  - Total: 92.49 km^{2} (35.71 sq mi)

Population (2021)
  - Total: 20,075
  - Density: 217/km^{2} (560/sq mi)
- Time zone: UTC+5:45 (Nepal Standard Time)
- Headquarter: Arkhawang
- Website: malikamungulmi.gov.np

Malika is a Rural municipality located within the Gulmi District of the Lumbini Province of Nepal. The rural municipality spans 92.49 square kilometres (35.71 sq mi) of area, with a total population of 20,075 according to the 2021 Census Result .

On March 10, 2017, the Government of Nepal restructured the local level bodies into 753 new local level structures. The previous Neta (half portion excluded), Darlung, Hawangdi, Arkhawang, Chhapahile, Arje, Dhamir and Marbhung VDCs were merged to form Malika Rural Municipality. Malika is divided into 8 wards, with Arkhawang declared the administrative center of the rural municipality.
