= Dhamir =

Ghamir घमिर
- Village of Malika Rural Municipality
- Location in Nepal
- Coordinates: 28.19°N 83.16°E
- Country: Nepal
- Province: Lumbini Zone
- District: Gulmi District

Population (2021)
  - Total: 3,323
- Time zone: UTC+5:45 (Nepal Time)
- Postal code: 32600

Dhamir, also Ghamir (घमिर), is a ward and former Village Development Committee(VDC) located within the Malika Rural Municipality in the Gulmi District of Lumbini Province in western Nepal. It is situated at latitude 28°12′7.81″ N and longitude 83°9′32.66″ E, at an altitude of 1,143 meters above sea level. The ward is bounded by several other wards of the Malika Rural Municipality and Dhurkot Rural Municipality, namely Arje, Chhapahile, Arkhawang, Marbhung Daghas and Wagla. According to the 2021 Nepal census, the total population of this ward is 3,323, with 883 households, resulting in an average household size of 3.76. The male population is 1,508 and the female population is 1,815, yielding a sex ratio of 83.09. The major caste/ethnic-groups include Chhetri, Hill Brahmin (Bahun), Magar, and Bishwokarma.

The village is considered the etymon of Ghimire, a Bahun surname. The current elected representatives of this ward include Ward Chairperson: Hira Bahadur Karki and Members: Shakuntala Panthi, Tara B.K, Champa Bahadur Karki, Surya Bahadur Budamagar

Places to visit in this ward include Ghamir Kot, Bhanupokhara, and Ghamir Deurali.
