= Ghimire =

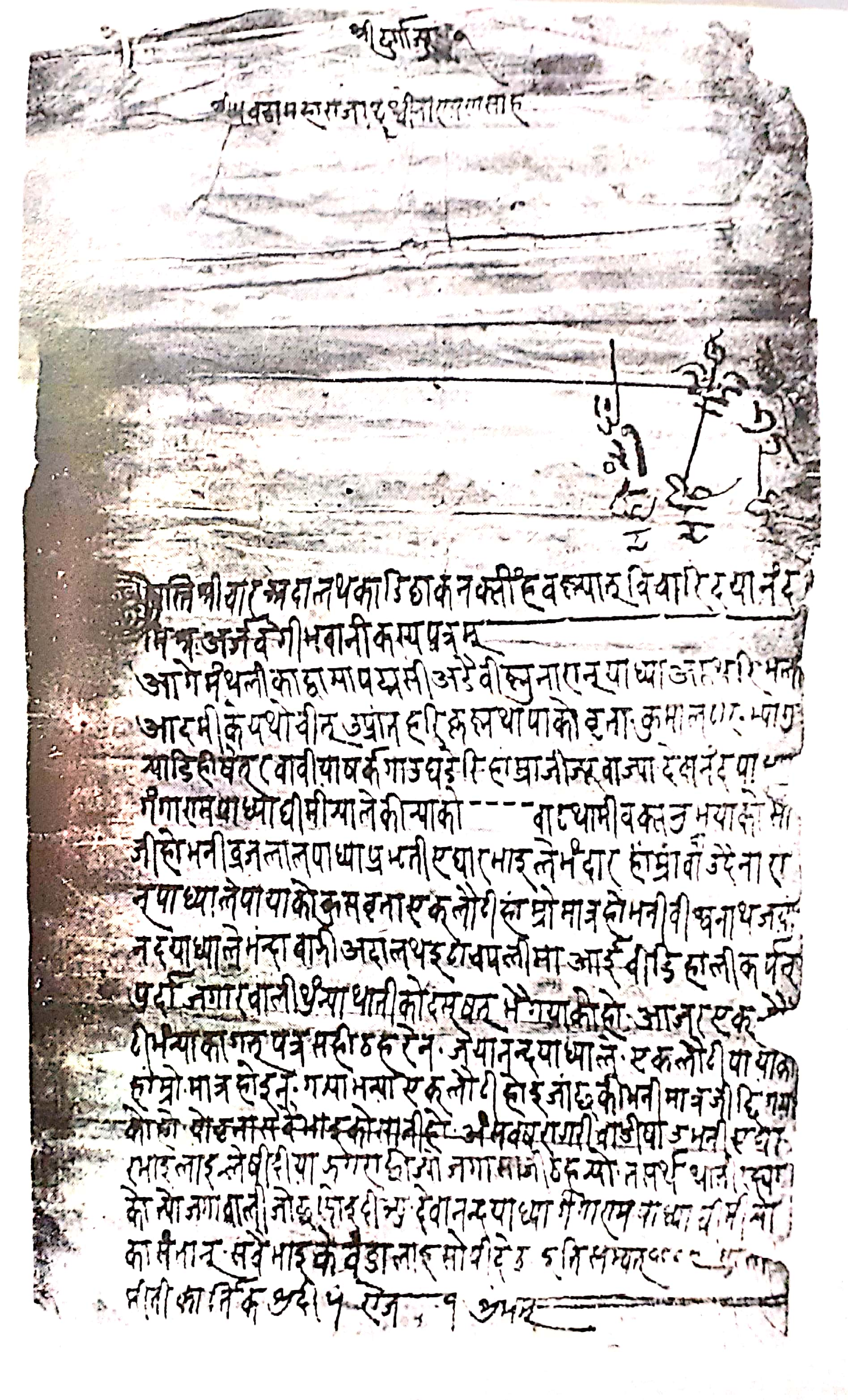
- Old Sanskrit manuscript written to King Prithivi Narayan Shah from the Ghimires in the 1700s
- Pronunciation: Ghimirē

Origin
- Languages: Khas, Nepali, Sanskrit
- Origin: Nepal

Other names
- Cognates: Agnihotri, Vyas, Upadhyay, Sharma
- Derivatives: Ghimirey, Ghimiray
- See also: Poudel, Pokharel, Dhakal, Aryal, Bhattarai

Ghimire (Nepali: घिमिरे), also spelled Ghimirey, Ghamire and Ghamiray, is a surname found among the Bahuns (Hill Brahmins) of Nepal. It derives from Dhamir, also spelled Ghamir, a village in western Nepal.

Research scholar, Parashu Ram Ghimire argues that the Bahuns who migrated from Ghamir to Musikot were the first to be called Ghamire/Ghimire and as such Musikot should be considered the place of origin. They claim ancestry from Gudpal Vyas (or Bias) the royal priest of legendary Indian emperor Vikramaditya of Ujjain, who is claimed to be a descendant of the rishis Kashyapa and Sandipani and said to have moved to Ghamir from Ujjain through Garhwal and Kumaon. Ghimire is thus stated to be the surname of Nepalis who lived in Ghamir, starting from the sons of Gudpal Vyas.

The three genealogical rishis (tripravar) are Kashyapa, Avatsara, Naidhruva.

== Notable people with surname Ghimire ==
- Bimala Ghimire, Nepali politician
- Dev Raj Ghimire, Nepali politician
- Durga Ghimire, Nepali social activist
- Jagadish Ghimire, Nepali writer
- Jhamak Ghimire, Nepali writer
- Kedar Ghimire, Nepali comedian
- Kunjana Ghimire, Nepali comedian
- Madhav Prasad Ghimire, Nepali poet
- Richa Ghimire, Nepali actress
- Shrawan Ghimire, Indian actor
- Tulsi Ghimire, Indian film director
