= Aryal =

Nepalese Khas Brahmin surname

Aryal अर्याल
- Pronunciation: /aːr.jaːl/
- Language: Nepali, Sanskrit

Origin
- Language: Khas
- Origin: Nepal
- Meaning: Toponym of Arje

Other names
- Variant forms: Ariyal, Arjel, Arjyal, Upadhyaya Aryal

Aryal (Nepali: अर्याल) is a surname of Khas people of Nepal, primarily found among Hill Brahmin and Hill Chhetri Hindu communities native to mid-western Himalayan region of Nepal. The Aryal surname belongs to the Atreya clan and traces its ancestry to the Sage Atreya (descendant of Maharishi Atreya). Historically, the Aryals held roles as advisers, scholars, and astrologers. The Aryal family was part of the Thar Ghar, the group of families that were associated with Kingdom of Gorkha, as well as the Kingdom of Nepal. The Aryal clan had an important role during the unification of Nepal and in the Gorkha Empire.

== Etymology ==
=== Derived from place-name element ===
The Aryal is a toponymic surname derived from Arje village, located in the Gulmi District of Lumbini Province, Nepal.

== History ==
The Aryals are traditionally traced to a migration into western Nepal through Kumaon and Garhwal, though some scholars link them to the indigenous Khas Dhamis, who adopted Brahmin status. Aryals are also said to have ruled the Kingdom of Isma, in present-day Gulmi District, for six generations.

Narayandas Arjyal, born in Amarpur in Isma, later moved to Gorkha and helped King Dravya Shah gain his throne. According to traditional documents, Narayandas Arjyal was an astrologer who predicted that Dravya Shah and Naraharishah would become kings. He reportedly met Ganesh Pande at Chhoprak, where they discussed replacing the Khadka Magar rulers of Gorkha with Dravya Shah. After a failed military attempt, Narayan Arjyal helped bring Dravya Shah to Tallokot, where the Khadka king was killed.

The Brahmans of the Aryal family of Gorkha served at the royal court and were skilled in reading and writing in the mother tongue. A letter written by Prithvi Narayan Shah to Pandit Rajivalochan of Kaski is cited as evidence of the family's involvement in royal correspondence during the period.Arjyal brahmans also served in royal religious ceremonies. The coronation of King Simha Pratap Shah was performed by Aryals including Shaktiballabh Aryal and Bhanu Joshi Arjyal.

According to the Divyo Upadesh, Bhanu Joshi Arjyal was also the one to accompany King Prithvi Narayan Shah to a trip to Chandragiri and predict that Shah’s wish to take over Kathmandu will come true.

In the 18th century, Visheshwar Aryal, a royal priest of the Gorkha Kingdom, was sent by Prithvi Narayan Shah to gather information about the Sen kingdom of Chaudandi in present-day eastern Nepal. There he won the favour of the Sen king and received a large birta (land grant) at Bairwa in present-day Saptari District. He was granted 917 bigha at Bairawa and 10 bigha at Hathina. The grant was reconfirmed after the Gorkha Kingdom conquered Chaudandi, and later Visheshwar’s son, Udayananda Arjyal, settled on the granted land.

== Family Tradition ==
The Aryal people traditionally worship Varaha as their family deity (Kuldevata) but some communities in Western Nepal also worship Kala Masto.

== Notable people ==
- Bhairav Aryal, Nepali author
- Shakti Ballav Aryal, Late Nepali writer
- N.P. Upadhyaya (Aryal), Nepali journalist
- Dol Prasad Aryal, Nepali politician
- Om Prakash Aryal, Nepali politician
- Padma Kumari Aryal, Nepali politician
- Prakash Aryal, Former Chief of Nepal Police
- Prashant Aryal, Nepali journalist
- Raju Aryal, Inspector General of Armed Police Force of Nepal
- Shakti Ballav Aryal, Nepali author
- Upendra Kant Aryal, Former Chief of Nepal Police
- Urmila Aryal, Nepali politician

== See also ==
- Aryan
- Indo-Aryan people
- Khas people
- Khasa Kingdom
- Kingdom of Gorkha
- Kingdom of Nepal
- Pahari people of Nepal
