= Agnihotra =

Ancient fire ritual of Hindu society

Agnihotra (IAST: Agnihotra, Devnagari: अग्निहोत्र) refers to the yajna of offering ghee into the sacred fire as per strict rites, and may include twice-daily heated milk offering made by those in the Śrauta tradition. The ritual has been described by P.E. Dumont as a "fertility charm", and as a "solar charm" which symbolically preserved and created the sun at nightfall and sunrise.

This tradition dates back to the Vedic age; the Brahmans perform the Agnihotra ritual chanting the verses from the Rigveda. It is part of a pan-Indo-Iranian heritage, which includes the related Iranian fire-worship ritual called Zoroastrian Yasna Haptaŋhāiti ritual mentioned in the Old Avestan. In the historical Vedic religion, Agnihotra was the simplest public rite, and the head of every Brahmin and Vaishya family was required to conduct it twice daily. It was already popular in India with Upaniṣads as religious performance. The tradition is now practiced in many parts of South Asia in the Indian sub-continent, including primarily India and also in Nepal. The Brahmin who performs the Agnihotra ritual is called an Agnihotri.

== Vedic Agnihotra ==
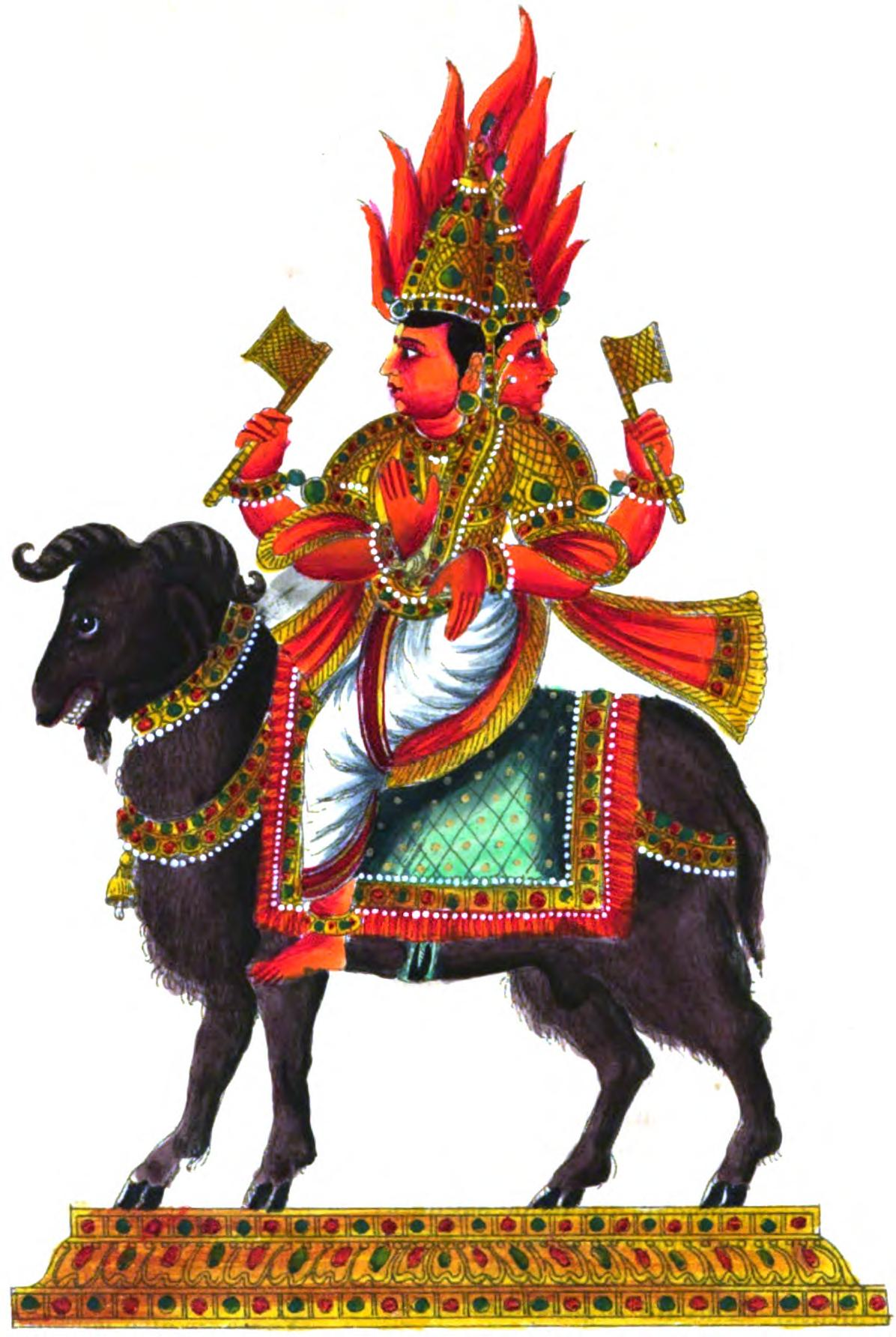
Agni, the recipient of the evening agnihotra.

=== Preliminaries ===
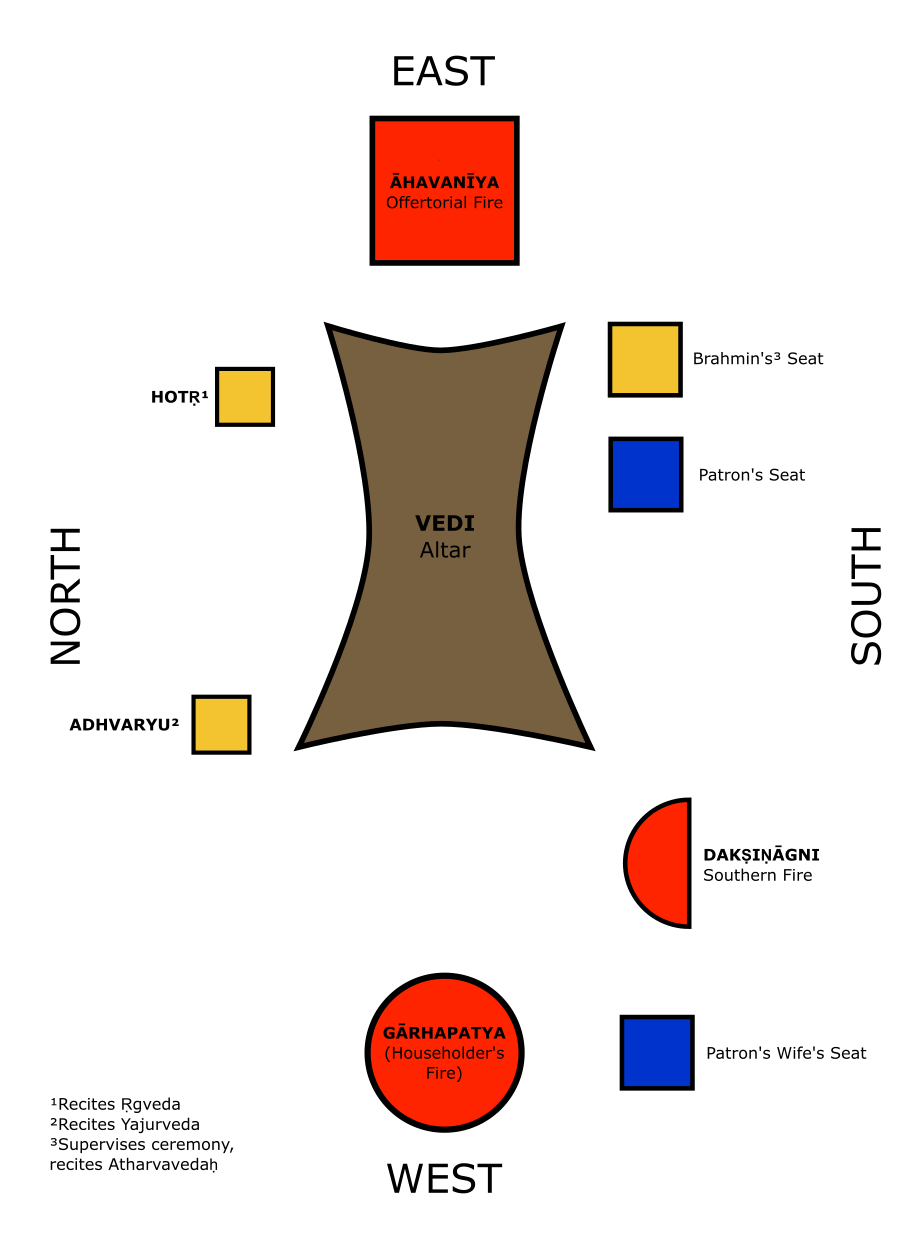
Typical sacrificial space used in Vedic yajnas with officiants

The ritual is conducted twice daily, right before or after sunrise and after sunset or the appearance of the first night star. The morning and evening agnihotras differ by the mantras and chants made by the officiants. At least four people take part in the sacrifice: the sacrificer, who hires priests to perform the ceremony (Brahmin), his wife, an Adhvaryu (Sanskrit: अध्वर्यु) and a milker.

Vedic rituals are typically performed by four priests: the aforementioned adhvaryu, who is responsible for the physical details of the sacrifice and chants the Yajurveda, a hotṛ (Sanskrit: होतृ) who recites the Rigveda, an udgātṛ (Sanskrit: उद्गातृ) who sings hymns of the Samaveda, and a brahman (Sanskrit: ब्राह्मण, romanized: brāhmaṇa) who supervises the ceremony, and recites the Atharvaveda while correcting any errors that may occur. There are three fires: an eastern offertorial fire called an āhavanīya (Sanskrit: आहवनीय) lit in a square fire pit, a western fire called the gārhapatya (Sanskrit: गार्हपत्य) lit in a circular fire pit, which represents the householder's fire, and a southern fire simply called the dakṣiṇāgni (Southern fire) (Sanskrit: दक्षिणाग्नि). During the ceremonies, a ritual poker, pot (Sanskrit: अग्निहोत्रस्थाली, romanized: agnihotrasthālī), a spoon (Sanskrit: स्रुव, romanized: sruva), and ladle (Sanskrit: अग्निहोत्रहवनी, romanized: agnihotrahavanī) are all used. At the centre of the ritual space is an earthen altar (Sanskrit: वेदी, romanized: vedī) where the tools to perform the ritual are placed.

The most common offering in the Agnihotra ritual is milk. The Kātyāyana Śrautasūtra advises devotees to sacrifice with milk to obtain cattle or a position in heaven. Alternative offerings for different goals are also recommended: the acquisition of a village with rice gruel, strength with plain rice grains, refined senses with curds, and "sharpness" or "spirit" (Sanskrit: तेज, romanized: teja) with ghee. Performance of the Agnihotra as a purely ritual obligation is known as nitya (Sanskrit: नित्य), while performance with a special purpose is called kāmya. (Sanskrit: काम्य)

=== Ritual ===
When the sacrificial area has been cleaned and the sacrificial fire lit, a cow is brought to the grounds and the milker, an ā́rya and not a śūdra, recites mantras before it, then brings the calf to the right side of its mother before beginning the milking. The milk is kept in the agnihotrasthālī, which can also only be made by an ā́rya.

When the milking is complete, the adhvaryu pours water around the three fires, before boiling the collected milk on coals collected from the gārhapatya. The adhvaryu draws milk into the ladle, pouring it first onto the āhavanῑya twice: first while reciting mantras, and the second silently as an offering to Prajapati. The mantra for offering the milk during the evening is "Agni is the light. The light is Agni, svaha". (Sanskrit: अग्निर् ज्योतिर् ज्योतिर् अग्निः स्वाहा, romanized: agnir jyotir jyotir agniḥ svāhā). In the morning, Surya is substituted for Agni: (Sanskrit: सूर्यो ज्योतिः ज्योतिः सूर्यः स्वाहा, romanized: sūryo jyotiḥ jyotiḥ sūryaḥ svāhā).

When the libations are complete, the ladle is cleaned with Darbha grass and refilled with water. It is then heated on the āhavanīya as additional mantras are recited, and poured onto the altar as an additional libation. In certain versions of the ritual (but not that contained in the Tattirīya Brahmana), this is followed by a blade of grass being offered to the āhavanīya. When the ceremony is complete, the adhvaryu sips some of the leftover water, recites the mantra "From Rta I have found Satya" and pours water on his head.

=== Ithihasa ===
The Brāhmaṇas give several explanations for the origin of the agnihotra. In one, Prajapati creates Agni, and then offers the sweat of his brow (which became ghee) or his eye after hearing his voice commanding himself to sacrifice, creating Surya. The origin of the exclamation svāhā, said as offerings are made into the sacrificial fire, is explained as a combination of svā (own) and āha (spoken). In another, the agnihotra is a condensed version of a thousand-year sacrifice Prajapati and the other devas performed to gain divine power.

== Agnihotra rituals in Nepal ==
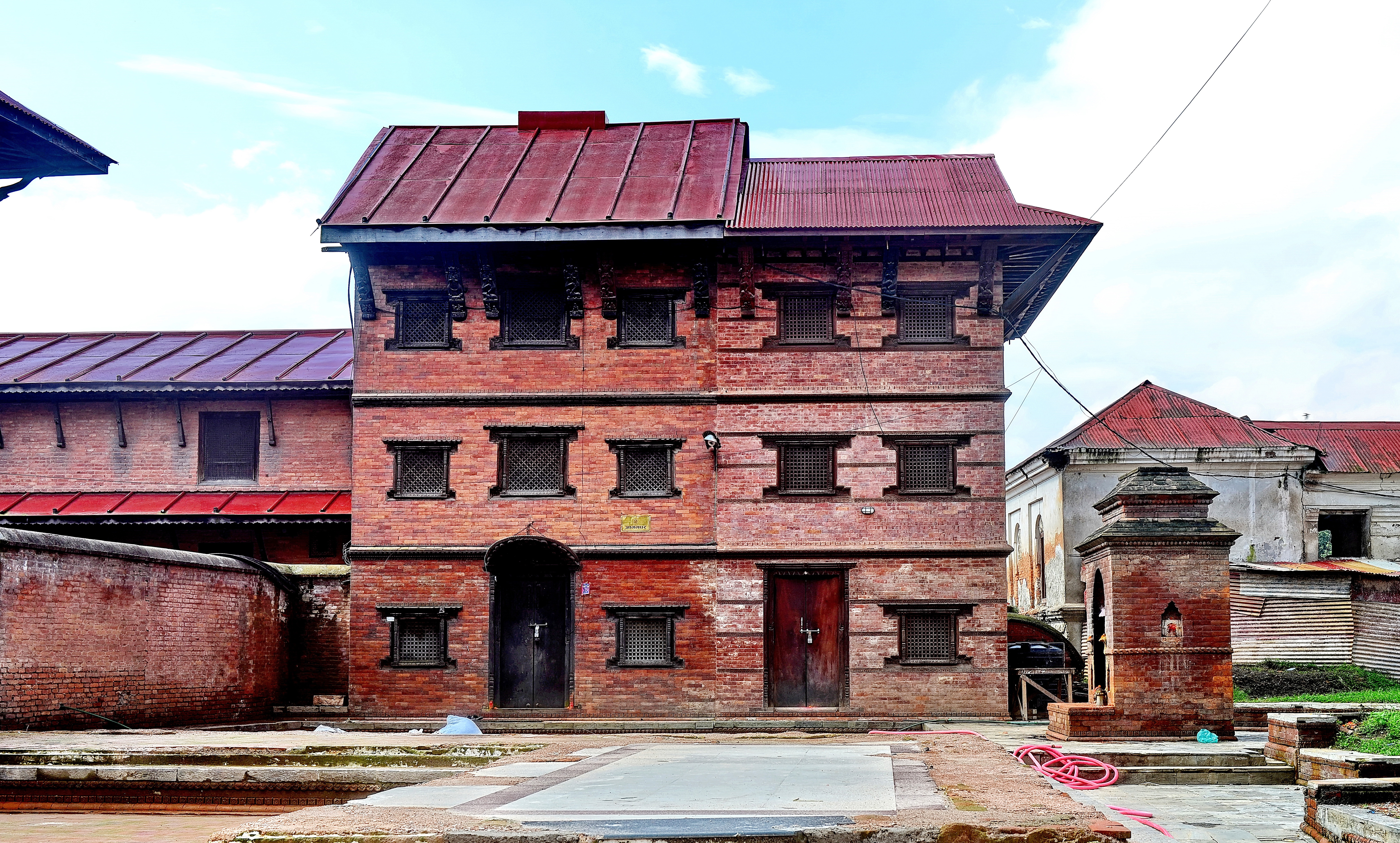
Agam House at Pashupatinath temple.

Witzel (1992) locates the first Agnishala hypothetically at Jhul (Mātātīrtha), in the western ridge of the Kathmandu valley and later at the southern rim of the palace of Aṃśuvermā at Hadigaon, Kathmandu. The first source of inscription evidence was from Tachapal tole, east part of Bhaktapur city, also shown by a legend that the Maithila King Harisimhadeva would establish the yantra of Taleju Bhavānī in the house of an Agnihotri. From 1600 CE onward, the Agnihotra has been attested to the Agnishala temple in Patan only.

The Agnihotra ritual in Nepal has been first recorded in an inscription of King Anandadeva in c. 1140 CE that mentions of the initiations of his two sons, viz. Yasho Malla and prince Somesvara at Agnimatha (or Agnishala in Lalitpur). The temple of Agnishala since the 12th century maintains the Vedic tradition of Agnihotra fire sacrifice ritual and despite having undergone many ritual changes, the basic Vedic performance is still intact. The Agnishala is maintained by the Newar Rajopadhyaya Brahmins of Patan, who are the premier Krishna Yajurvedic Brahmins of Nepal.

Along with these, there are other Agnishalas identified and recently revived, viz.

- at southern edge of Pashupatinath temple (a UNESCO World Heritage Site of Nepal) by a Purbe Brahmin. This has been in practice for almost 200 years now, and for this Agnishala, in 1974 the government provided NRs. 18,000 (then around US$7,000) per year.
- at Kumarigal, south of Bouddha (another UNESCO World Heritage Site in Nepal) in Kathmandu by Narayan Prasad, a Purbe Brahmin
- at Thamel, north of central Kathmandu by Tirtha Raj Acharya

== Arya Samaj ==
Arya Samaj is a religious reform movement founded in 1875 advocating a return to Vedic religion as interpreted by its founder, Dayananda Saraswati. Strongly criticizing the "Puranic" ritual of performing pujas to murtis (religious images such as statues), adherents perform a variation of agnihotra as part of the five yajnas as described in Vedic texts.

== Gajanan Maharaj ==
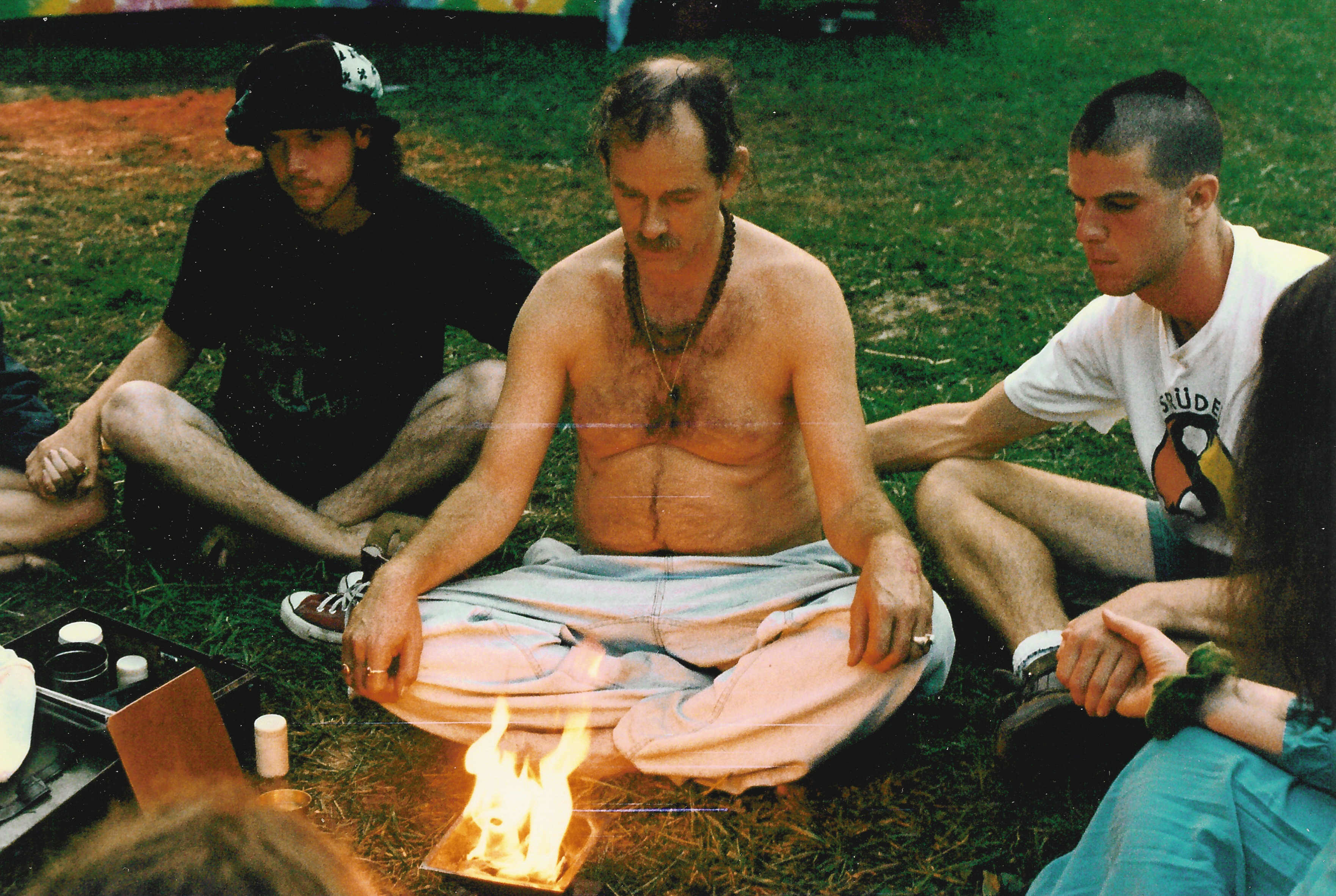
Modern Agnihotra after Gajanan Maharaj performed at Snoqualmie Moondance festival, 1992.

A simplified variant of the agnihotra ceremony was popularized in the mid-1900s by Gajanan Maharaj, (Note: The Gajanan Maharaj who promoted agnihotra was not the 19th century saint, but an identically-named religious leader active in the 20th century) and entails the offering of ghee and brown rice into only a single fire lit in a copper pyramid-shaped brazier with cow dung and additional amounts of ghee. Mantras are repeated during this process. Practitioners claim a number of physical and environmental benefits from performing the ritual. However, these have not been empirically verified in controlled experiments and are thus pseudoscientific: in 2007, Sylvia Kratz and Ewald Schaung found that while Agnihotra ash possibly increased the amount of phosphorus in soil, levels were the same regardless of whether the ceremony was done at the prescribed times with mantras or not. The composition of the pyramids was found to be a factor, with ash from iron pyramids containing significantly less phosphorus than that from copper equivalents.

=== Mantras ===
Like the Vedic Agnihotra, the modern version of Agnihotra perpetuated by Gajanan Maharaj and groups such as Homa Therapy has two variants, one for the evening and one for the morning. At sunset, the practitioner says "Agnaye svāhā Agnaye Idam na mama" (Devanagari: अग्नये स्वाहा इदम् अग्नये न मम), (Note: Lit. "[This is] for Agni, svāhā. [This is] for Agni, and not for me.") offering the first half of the rice or ghee into the fire after "svāhā" is spoken. After the first mantra is said, the practitioner then says, "Prajāpataye svāhā Prajāpataye idam na mama" (Devanagari: प्रजापतये स्वाहा प्रजापतये इदम् न मम), (Note: Lit. "[This is] for Prajāpati, svāhā. [This is] for Prajāpati, and not for me.) again offering a second portion of rice and/or ghee as soon as "svāhā" is spoken. The morning Agnihotra is identical, save for the fact that Surya is substituted for Agni.

== Regional Variation: Agnihomam ==
In the North Malabar region of Kerala, the ritual known as Agnihomam represents an ancient indigenous variation of fire-based initiation practiced by the Thiyyar community. Unlike the standard Vedic Agnihotra, which primarily involves daily oblations into a consecrated fire, the Agnihomam is a one-time, rigorous rite of passage that transitions a warrior (Chekon) into a divine or semi-divine status (Divyan).

=== Etymology and Identity ===
The term Thiyyar is traditionally linked to the Sanskrit term Veetihotra, meaning "Fire God" or "one who has completed the fire rite." Locally, it is interpreted as "those who have worn the fire" (Thee-ye-dharichavar). While colonial historians such as Hermann Gundert proposed a derivation from Dweepu (island), this is contested by regional scholars who view the Agnihomam ritual as the primary historical basis for the community's name and identity.

=== Ritual Process ===
The ritual is described as a "fire bath" (Agni-Snanam), consisting of three distinct phases:

- Mei Oppikkal (Preparation): The body is smeared with Kalabham (sandal paste) and Kasturi (musk) for spiritual and physical cooling.
- Bandhanam (The Binding): The initiate is bound with gold and silver chains, symbolizing a state of intense penance (Vrutham).
- Agni-Pravesham (The Entry): The initiate leaps into the Meleri, a massive fire pit. Successful completion signifies that the individual has transcended the mortal self and attained divinity.

=== Social and Comparative Significance ===
Following the completion of Agnihomam, the initiate is granted the Poonool (sacred thread), Yogapattam, and Mudra by the Yogeeswarans. This conferment bears structural similarities to the Navjote ceremony in Zoroastrianism, where the Kusti thread is awarded as a symbol of spiritual responsibility. Historians note that this ritual historically elevated the initiate to a social and spiritual status that functioned outside the traditional caste hierarchy of Kerala..

== See also ==
- Agni
- Homa
- Agnicayana
- Fire Sermon
- Yajna
- Dhyāna in Hinduism#Agnihotra
- Pranagnihotra Upanishad
