= Prayer compensation =

Islamic prayer

- Official name: قضاء الصلاة الفائتة، تعويض الفوائت
- Also called: Catch-up prayer
- Observed by: Muslims
- Type: Islamic
- Significance: A Muslim prayer offered to God to make up for the sin of an unfulfilled prayer.
- Observances: Sunnah prayers, Salah times
- Related to: Salah, Nafl prayer, Five Pillars of Islam, Islamic prayers

Prayer compensation (Arabic: قضاء الصلاة الفائتة) is an Islamic prayer (salat) that is performed to make up for an earlier lost and unfulfilled prayer.

== Religious origin ==
The religious duty to compensate for omitted or forgotten prayers finds its framework of Islamic legislation in the Quranic verses and prophetic hadiths.

This obligation of subsequent fulfillment and compensation is cited in the Quran into the Āyah 14 of Surah Ta-Ha:

سورة طه، الآية 14: "إِنَّنِيَ أَنَا اللَّهُ لَا إِلَٰهَ إِلَّا أَنَا فَاعْبُدْنِي وَأَقِمِ الصَّلَاةَ لِذِكْرِي".

English: Indeed I am Allah —there is no god except Me. So worship Me, and maintain the prayer for My remembrance.
(Quran: 20:14)

This jurisprudential opinion was based on the prophetic hadith narrated by the companion Anas ibn Malik in the Al-Mu'jam al-Awsat, which reads:

Arabic hadith	English translation
Arabic: « مَنْ نَسِيَ صَلَاةً أَوْ نَامَ عَنْهَا فَكَفَّارَتُهُ أَنْ يُصَلِّيَهَا إِذَا ذَكَرَهَا. » — Hadith	English: « If anyone forgets a stated prayer or oversleeps, expiation is made by observing it when he remembers it. » — Hadith

== Juristic opinion ==
Making up obligatory prayers (fard) whose legal time (salah times) has passed is obligatory (wajib) immediately, whether the missed is due to an excuse that is not forfeited and canceled for prayer, or it was missed without an originally acceptable excuse, according to the agreement of three of several Imams of the Sunni schools (madhahib) of jurisprudence (fiqh).

It is not permissible to delay making up missed prayers except for an acceptable excuse, such as striving to gain livelihood, studying the knowledge that a Muslim is obligated to do in kind for his person, and the food and sleep necessary to maintain the health and integrity of the body.

And since delaying the prayer until its time (salah times) has ended is a major sin in Islam, the expiation for this misconduct is not only by merely performing the physical compensation of the missed rak'ahs, rather it must be associated with a correct and sincere repentance (tawbah) from this negligence and wasting the obligatory prayer (fard).

Likewise, the sin and debt of the missed prayer does not rise by mere moral repentance without practically performing its rak'ahs, rather it is necessary to actually make up for the obligatory prayer, because one of the conditions of sincere repentance is that there should be a cessation from the sin committed, and the repentant from wasting the prayer without making up for it is considered unquestioned from his great sin.

== Missing reasons ==
Muslim jurists believe that the reasons and excuses that are permissible for delaying prayer beyond its time are sleep, forgetfulness, and negligence from the beginning of the time, even if that results from the shortcomings of the worshiper.

The missed prayers are made up only by a person who has no excuses for missing them; for example, we find menstruating and postpartum women do not have to make up what they missed during menstruation and postpartum afterwards, and the insane and the passed out do not make up missed prayers, and the apostate if he returns to Islam is like the original infidel (kafir) who does not have to make up for what he missed with the Maliki and Hanafi jurists.

== See also ==
- Salah
- Loud prayer
- Silent prayer
