= Time in Uzbekistan =

- Time zone
- Clock tower in Tashkent

UTC offset
- UZT: UTC+05:00

Current time
- 00:22, 28 September 2026 UTC+05:00 [refresh]

Observance of DST
- DST is not observed in this time zone.

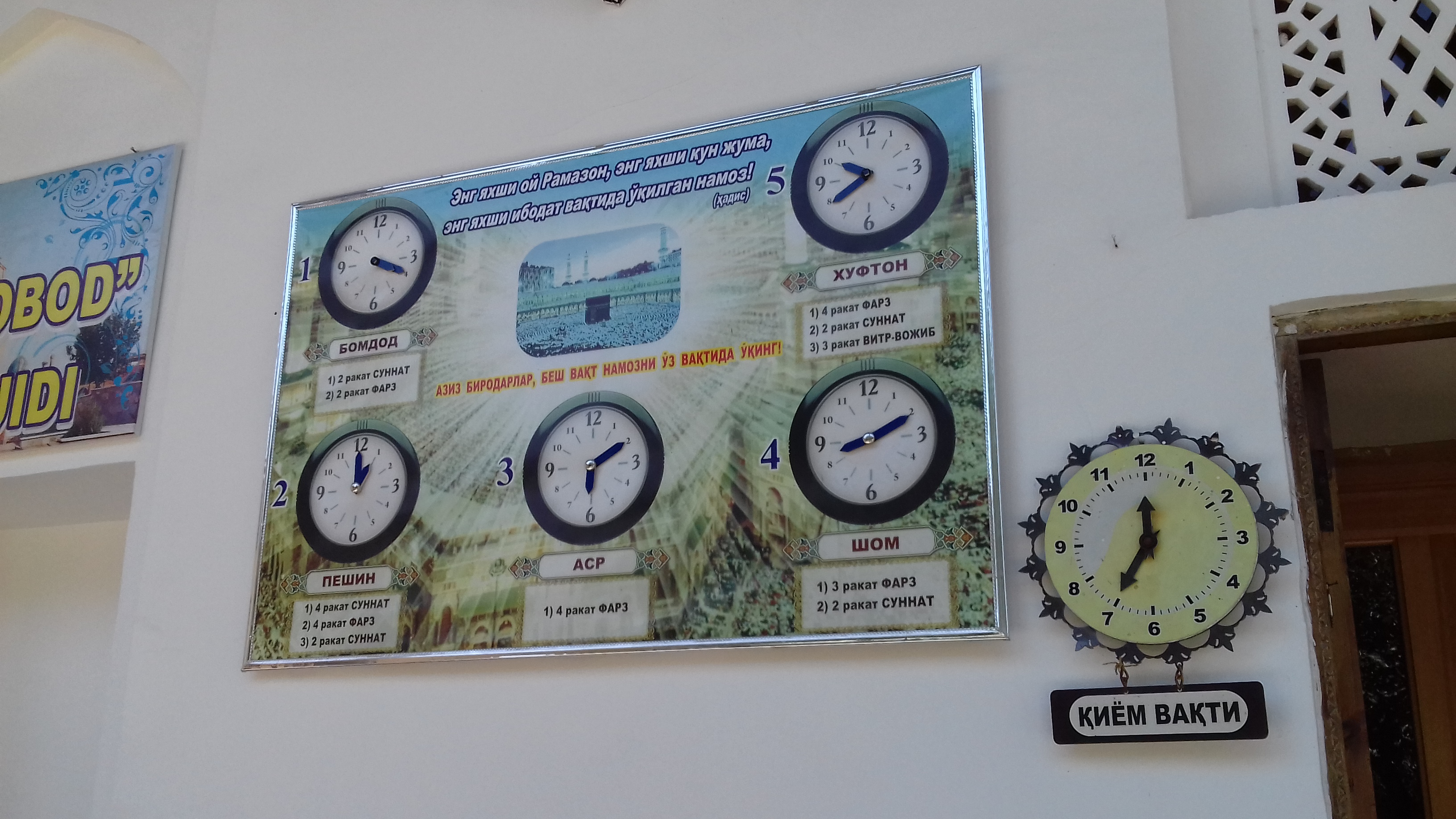
Clock at a mosque in Samarkand, with Islamic prayer times

Uzbekistan time (UZT) is the standard time in Uzbekistan; it is 5 hours ahead of UTC, UTC+05:00. The standard time uses no daylight saving time, though there has been constant debate whether to adopt it in order to increase leisure time.

After the breakup of the Soviet Union there were two time zones in Uzbekistan. In the Soviet-era most time zones were daylight time in the winter and double daylight time in the summer. The western part of the country observed Samarkand Time 5 or 6 hours ahead of UTC. The eastern part observed Tashkent Time 6 or 7 hours ahead of UTC. In 1991 the clocks did not move forward in the spring to maintain single daylight time only in the summer. That fall a unified time zone was adopted 5 hours ahead of UTC.

== IANA time zone database ==
Data for Uzbekistan directly from zone.tab of the IANA time zone database.

c.c.	Coordinates	Timezone name	Comments	UTC offset
UZ	+3940+06648	Asia/Samarkand	Uzbekistan (west)	+05:00
UZ	+4120+06918	Asia/Tashkent	Uzbekistan (east)	+05:00

== See also ==
- GMT
- Time zone
- UTC+05:00
- Uzbekistan
