= Salah times =

Timing of Islamic prayers

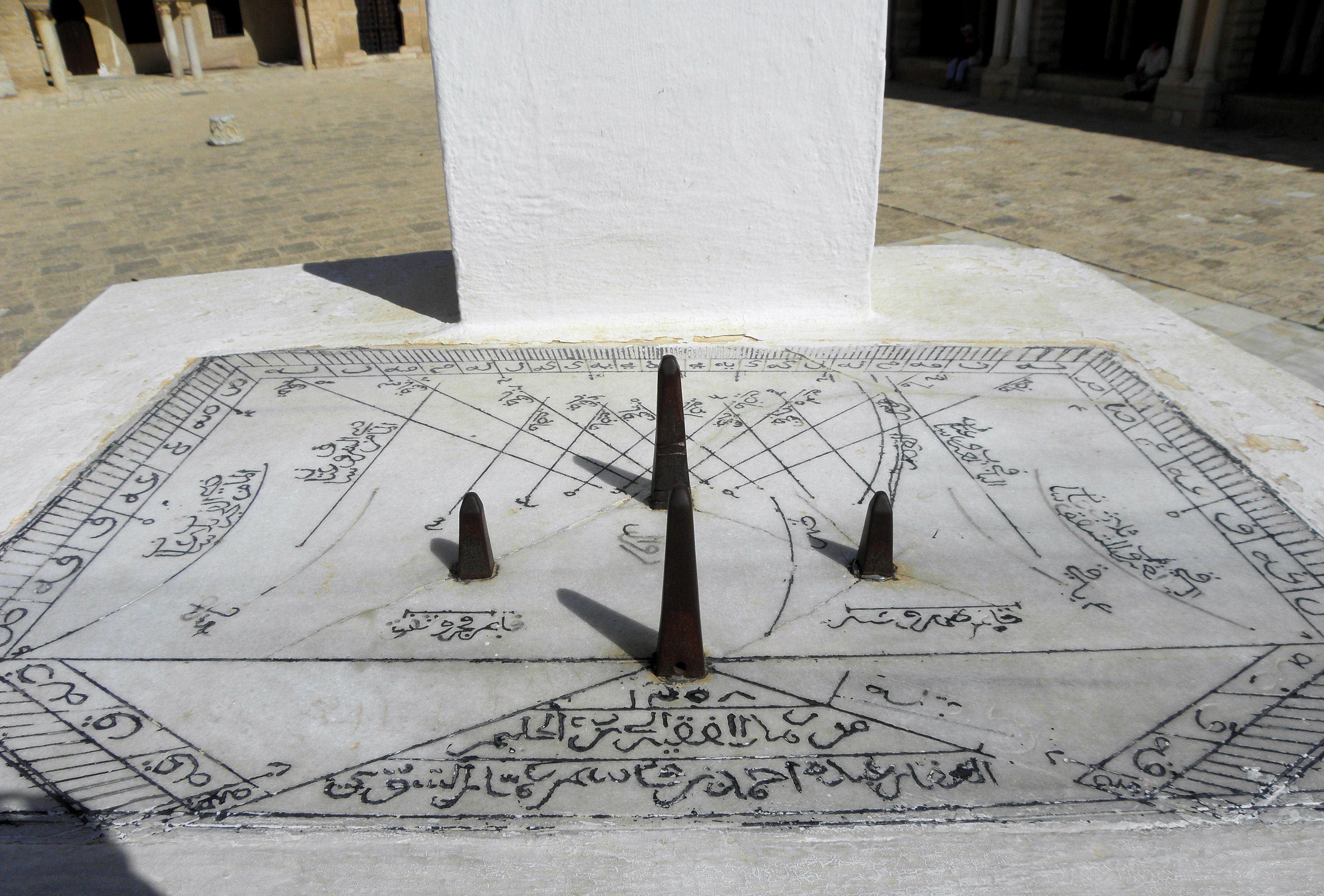
Sundial indicating prayer times, situated in the courtyard of the Great Mosque of Kairouan, Tunisia. Author: Keith Roper

Salah times are prayer times when Muslims perform salat. The term is primarily used for the five daily prayers including the Friday prayer, which takes the place of the Dhuhr prayer and must be performed in a group. Muslims believe the salah times were revealed by Allah to Muhammad.

Prayer times are standard for Muslims in the world, especially the fard prayer times. They depend on the condition of the Sun and geography. There are varying opinions regarding the exact salah times, the schools of Islamic thought differing in minor details. All schools of thought agree that any given prayer cannot be performed before its stipulated time.

Muslims pray a minimum of five times a day, with their fard (obligatory) prayers being known as Fajr (before dawn), Dhuhr (noon), Asr (late afternoon), Maghrib (at sunset), and Isha (nighttime), always facing towards the Kaaba. The direction of prayer is called the qibla; the early Muslims initially prayed in the direction of Jerusalem before this was changed to Mecca in 624 CE, about a year after Muhammad's migration to Medina.

The timing of the five prayers are fixed intervals defined by daily astronomical phenomena. For example, the Maghrib prayer can be performed at any time after sunset and before the disappearance of the red twilight from the west. In a mosque, the muezzin broadcasts the call to prayer at the beginning of each interval. Because the start and end times for prayers are related to the solar diurnal motion, they vary throughout the year and depend on the local latitude and longitude when expressed in local time. (Note: For the day-to-day variation of the prayer times, see, for example, a prayer timetable for Banyuasin, Indonesia, for the month of Ramadan in 2012.) In modern times, various religious or scientific agencies in Muslim countries produce annual prayer timetables for each locality, and electronic clocks capable of calculating local prayer times have been created. In the past, some mosques employed astronomers called the muwaqqits who were responsible for regulating the prayer time using mathematical astronomy.

Prayer Time throughout the year for Kolkata, West Bengal, India

The five intervals were defined by Muslim authorities in the decades after the death of Muhammad in 632, based on the hadith (the reported sayings and actions) of the Islamic prophet.

== Daily prayers ==
The daily prayers are considered obligatory (fard) by many and they are performed at times determined essentially by the position of the Sun in the sky. Hence, salat times vary at different locations on the Earth. Wudu is needed for all of the prayers.

Some Muslims pray three times a day.

Overview of prayer times considered obligatory by most
Compulsory (fard) prayer	Prescribed time	Fajr prayer Zuhr prayer Asr prayer Maghrib prayer Isha prayer The prescribed times of the prayers depicted in place of the position of the sun in the sky, relative to the worshipper.
Fajr	Begins at dawn, may be performed up to sunrise after Fajr nafl prayer	Fajr prayer Zuhr prayer Asr prayer Maghrib prayer Isha prayer The prescribed times of the prayers depicted in place of the position of the sun in the sky, relative to the worshipper.
Zuhr	From when the sun has passed the zenith, may be performed up to the time of Asr.	Fajr prayer Zuhr prayer Asr prayer Maghrib prayer Isha prayer The prescribed times of the prayers depicted in place of the position of the sun in the sky, relative to the worshipper.
Asr	From when the shadow cast by an object is once or twice its length, may be performed up to the time of Maghrib. (Note: According to Imam Abu Hanifa, "Asr starts when the shadow of an object becomes twice its height (plus the length of its shadow at the start time of Zuhr)." For the rest of Imams, "Asr starts when the shadow of an object becomes equal to its length (plus the length of its shadow at the start time of Zuhr)." Asr ends as the sun begins to set.)	Fajr prayer Zuhr prayer Asr prayer Maghrib prayer Isha prayer The prescribed times of the prayers depicted in place of the position of the sun in the sky, relative to the worshipper.
Maghrib	Begins at sunset, may be performed up to the end of dusk.	Fajr prayer Zuhr prayer Asr prayer Maghrib prayer Isha prayer The prescribed times of the prayers depicted in place of the position of the sun in the sky, relative to the worshipper.
Isha (Note: Further information on the usage of the word "Isha" (evening) see Quran 12:16, Quran 79:46)	Begins with the night, may be delayed up to dawn although disliked (Note: According to Shia Muslims, Asr prayer and Isha prayer have no set times but are said any time starting from midday. Zuhr and Asr prayers must be offered before sunset, and the time for Asr starts after Zuhr has been prayed. Maghrib and Isha prayers must be offered before midnight, and the time for Isha prayer can start after Maghrib has been prayed, as long as no more light remains in the western sky signifying the arrival of the true night.)	Fajr prayer Zuhr prayer Asr prayer Maghrib prayer Isha prayer The prescribed times of the prayers depicted in place of the position of the sun in the sky, relative to the worshipper.

=== Fajr (dawn) ===
Fajr begins at subh saadiq—true dawn or the beginning of twilight, when the morning light appears across the full width of the sky—and ends at sunrise.

=== Dhuhr (midday) ===
The time interval for offering the Zuhr or Dhuhr salah timing starts after the sun passes its zenith and lasts until call for the Asr prayer is given. This prayer needs to be given in the middle of the work-day, and people normally make their prayers during their lunch break.

=== Asr (afternoon) ===
Asr salat is the third of the obligatory prayers that Muslims offer daily. It is also known as “middle prayer." The Asr prayer starts when the shadow of an object is the same length as the object itself (or, according to Hanafi school, twice its length) plus the shadow length at Dhuhr, and lasts till the start of sunset. Asr can be split into two sections; the preferred time is before the sun starts to turn orange, while the time of necessity is from when the sun turns orange until 15 minutes before Maghrib.

=== Maghrib (sunset) ===
The Maghrib prayer begins, when the sun sets, and lasts until the red light has left the sky in the west.

=== Isha (nights) ===
The Isha'a or Isha prayer starts when the red twilight disappears from the west, and lasts until the middle of the night, which is the middle point between Maghrib Salat and Fajr salaat (others say it’s third of the night, or until fajr time)

== Time calculation ==
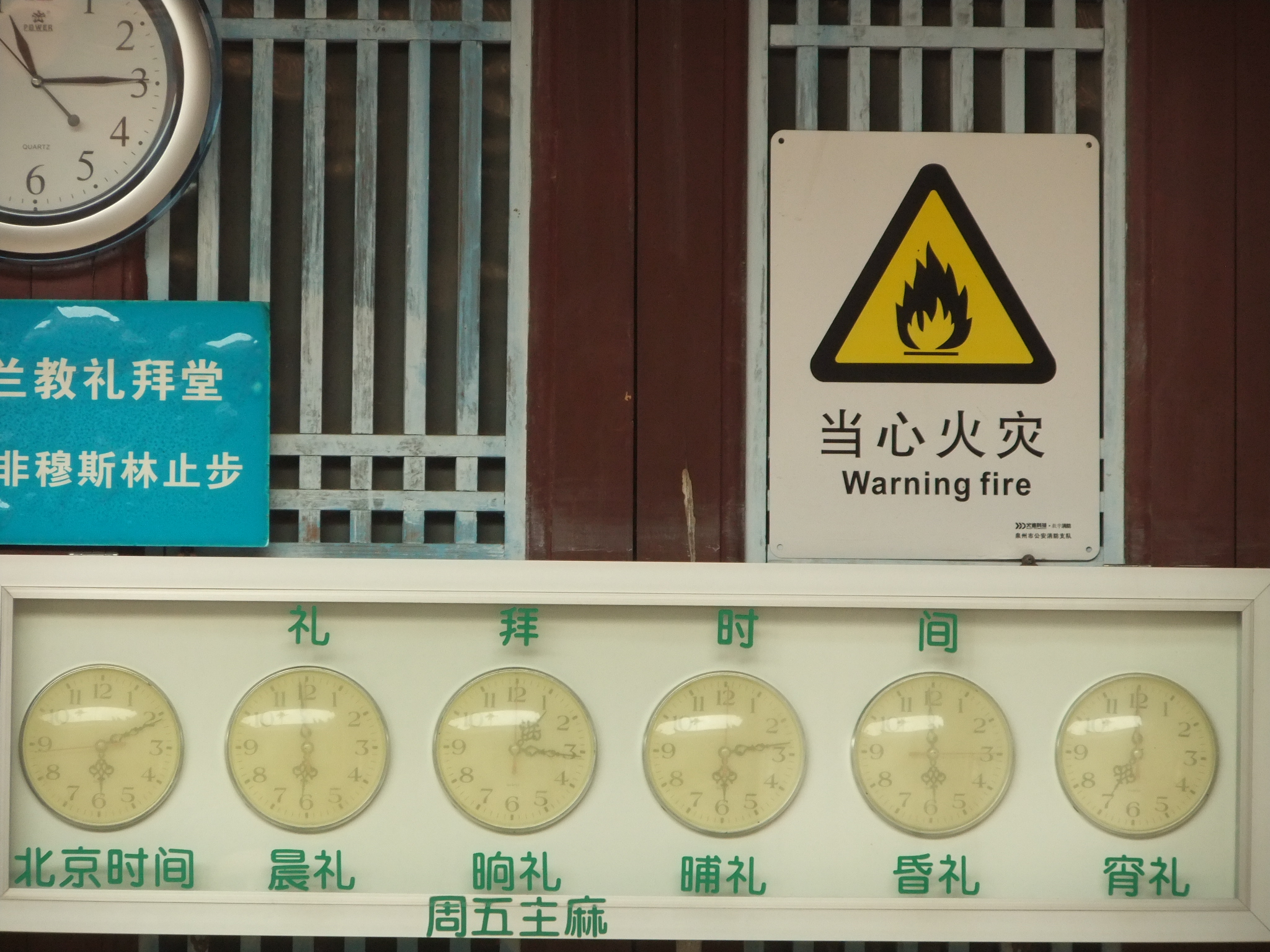
Qingjing Mosque, Quanzhou, China, with adjustable clocks displaying prayer times (the leftmost clock is for the Friday public prayer, then the next five are for Fajr, Dhuhr, Asr, Maghrib, Isha).

Equation of time

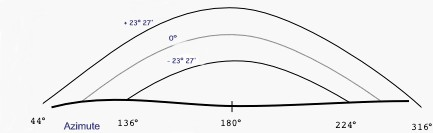
Declination of the sun

To calculate prayer times two astronomical measures are necessary, the declination of the sun and the difference between clock time and sundial clock. This difference being the result of the eccentricity of the Earth's orbit and the inclination of its axis, it is called the equation of time. The declination of the sun is the angle between sun's rays and the equator plan.

In addition to the above measures, to calculate prayer times for a specific location we need its spherical coordinates.

In the following;

- $Z$ is the time zone.
- $\lambda$ and $\phi$ are the longitude and the latitude of the considered point, respectively.
- $\Delta t$ and $\delta$ denotes the equation of time term and the declination of the Sun for a given date, respectively.

We first give the midday (Dhuhr) time. The midday time is simply when the local true solar time reaches noon:

$$T_{\mathsf{Dhuhr}} = 12 + \Delta t + (Z - \lambda/15)$$

The first term is the 12 o'clock noon, the second term accounts for the difference between true and mean solar times, and the third term accounts for the difference between the local mean solar time and the time zone.

The other times require converting the Sun's altitude to time. We use a variant of the generalized sunrise equation:

$$T(\alpha) = \frac{1}{15} \arccos \left( \frac{-\sin(\alpha)-\sin(\phi)\sin(\delta)}{\cos(\phi)\cos(\delta)} \right)$$

This gives, in hours, the difference between Dhuhr time and when the sun is at altitude $\alpha$. Now we calculate three of the other prayer times:

- Sunrise (Shuruq) time and Sunset (Maghrib) times are given by $T(-0.833^{\circ})$. (The astronomical sunset/sunrise that occurs at $\alpha = 0$, but atmospheric refraction makes the sun appear 50 arcminutes higher.) So $T_{\mathsf{Shuruq}} = T_{\mathsf{Dhuhr}} - T(0.833^{\circ})$ and $T_{\mathsf{Maghrib}} = T_{\mathsf{Dhuhr}} + T(0.833^{\circ})$.
  - If we consider the elevation of the point we should add $0.0347^{\circ} \times \sqrt{h}$ to 0.833°, where h is the elevation in meters (see Sunrise equation § Hour angle).
  - Maghrib prayer is called for when the sun is completely folded behind the horizon, plus 3 minutes by precaution.
- For Fajr and Isha many conventions about the angle $\alpha$ exist. It is of 17 and 18 degrees respectively for Fajr and Isha prayers according to the Muslim World League. As a result, we have $T_{\mathsf{Fajr}} = T_{\mathsf{Dhuhr}} - T(18^{\circ})$ and $T_{\mathsf{Isha}} = T_{\mathsf{Dhuhr}} + T(17^{\circ})$.
- The Asr time is defined in term of the length of its shadow, with differing opinions about how much longer the shadow is. Let $n$ be the required length of the object shadow relative to its own length. We first find the Sun's altitude as $A(n) = \arccot(n+\left|\tan(\phi-\delta)\right|).$ The Asr time is then given as $T_{\mathsf{Shuruq}} = T_{\mathsf{Dhuhr}} + T(A(n)),$ where the ratio n is 1 or 2 depending on jurisprudence.
  - It is possible to also correct for atmospheric refraction, but most sources do not do so. After all, the refraction error is much smaller for α > 10°.

Muslims use readily available apps on their phone to find daily prayer times in their locality. Technological advances have allowed for products such as software-enhanced azan clocks that use a combination of GPS and microchips to calculate these formulas. This allows Muslims to live further away from mosques than previously possible, as they no longer need to rely solely on a muezzin in order to keep an accurate prayer schedule.

== See also ==
- Canonical hours
- Direction of prayer
- Watchkeeping
- Zmanim
- https://prayertimeguide.liveblog365.com/

== Calculation conventions ==
Prayer times are calculated from the sun's position, and different organisations use different conventions, mainly the sun angle below the horizon used for Fajr and Isha. Some methods define Isha as a fixed number of minutes after Maghrib instead of an angle. These differences can change the calculated times by several minutes, and the conventions are used in different regions.

Common prayer time calculation conventions
Method	Fajr angle	Isha	Region where used
Muslim World League	18°	17°	Europe, Far East, parts of the United States
Islamic Society of North America (ISNA)	15°	15°	North America
Egyptian General Authority of Survey	19.5°	17.5°	Africa, Syria, Lebanon, Malaysia
Umm al-Qura University, Makkah	18.5°	90 minutes after Maghrib (120 during Ramadan)	Arabian Peninsula
University of Islamic Sciences, Karachi	18°	18°	Pakistan, Afghanistan, Bangladesh, India

In the Umm al-Qura method the Fajr angle was 19° before December 2008.

=== High latitudes ===
At high latitudes in summer, the sun may never reach the angle required for Fajr or Isha, so the calculation cannot be completed in the usual way. Methods address this with rules such as using the times of a lower latitude or a fraction of the night.
