= N. P. Upadhyaya =

Late Nepalese Journalist

N.P. Upadhyaya
- Born: late 1940s Bairawa, Nepal
- Died: 7 September 2024; Los Angeles, United States
- Occupations: Journalist; Telegraph Nepal

Narendra Prasad Upadhyaya Aryal, also known as N.P. Upadhyaya (Nepali: नरेन्द्र प्रसाद उपाध्याय अर्याल; c. 1940 – 7 September 2024) was a Nepalese journalist and editor-in-chief of Telegraph Nepal.

== Early life and Career ==
Upadhyaya was born in the village of Bairawa of Saptari District. He moved to Biratnagar, and was raised in a small village called Bakhari, where he attended Adarsha School and later moved to Kathmandu in the mid-1960s.

His journalism career started with the Jyoti Weekly in 1969. Alongside being a journalist, he worked as a teacher for much of his life.

N. P. Upadhyaya Aryal (right) with Ghulam Ali (left) in 1954

According to sources, he founded The Telegraph Weekly in 2007.

He published a book named Complexities of the South Asian Political Order, on South Asian politics.

== Death ==
Upadhyaya died at 3:38 p.m. on Saturday, 7 September 2024 (California time), while receiving treatment at a hospital in Los Angeles.
