= Agnihotri =

Agnihotri is an Indian Hindu Brahmin surname derived from the Sanskrit word Agnihotra. The term Agnihotri originally referred to the Hindu Brahmins who maintained the sacred fire during the fire rituals.

People with this surname include:

- Atul Agnihotri (born 1970), Bollywood actor
- Apurva Agnihotri, Indian actor
- Bharat Agnihotri (born 1953), member of the Alberta Liberal Party.
- Mezhathol Agnihothri (born 4th century AD), Shrauta High Priest who revived the ancient traditions of Yaagam in Bharatam
- Rati Agnihotri (born 1960), veteran Indian actress
- Shiv Narayan Agnihotri (born 1850), founder of the Deva Samaj
- Shilpa Saklani Agnihotri (born 1982), television actress
- Satish K. Agnihotri (born 1956), Madras high court judge
- Sunil Agnihotri (born 1982), Writer and hockey analyst for CBC Edmonton.
- Vivek Agnihotri, Indian Bollywood director
- Pratik Agnihotri (born 1998), Indian Musician,singer,composer
