= Sunset =

Daily falling of the Sun below the horizon

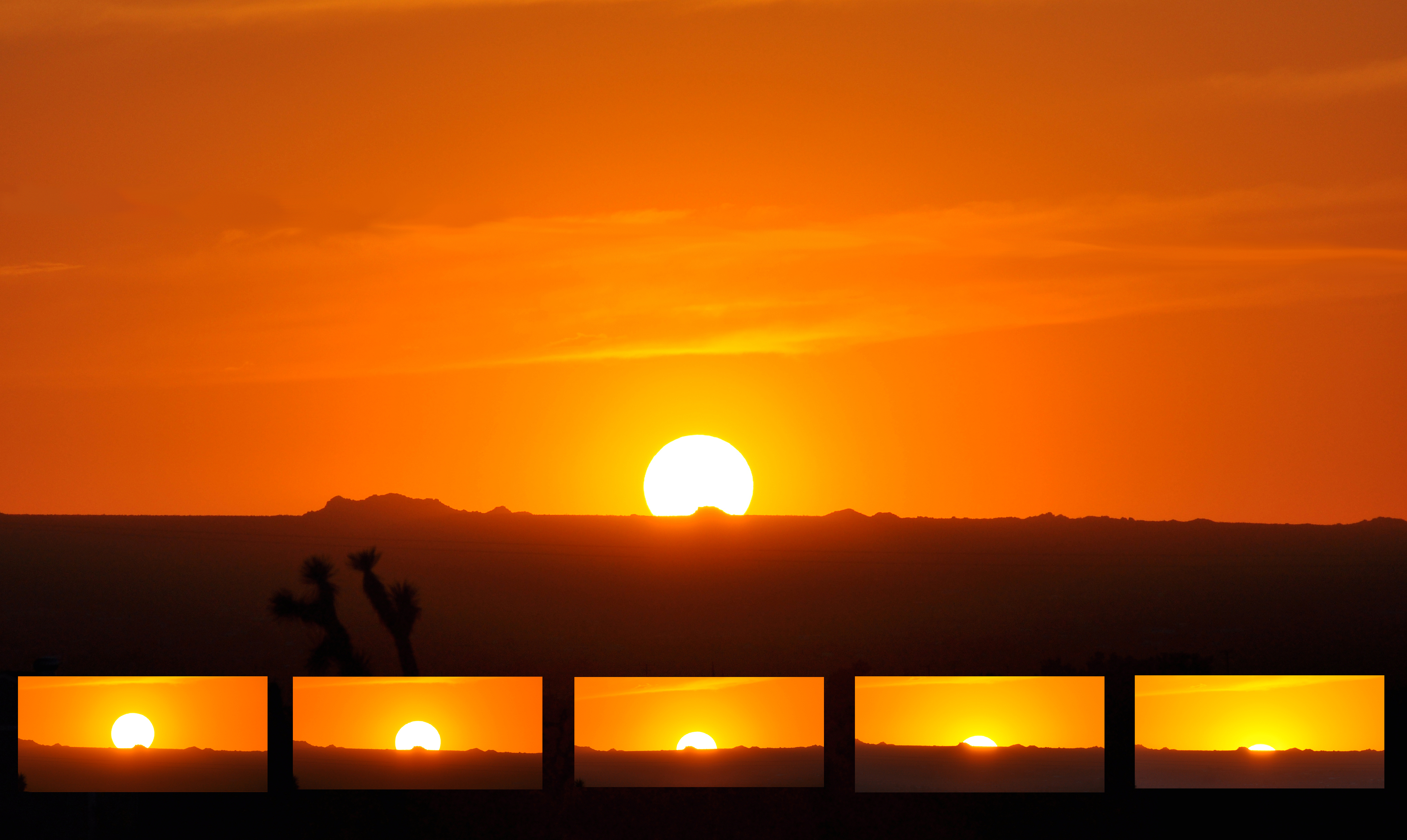
Actual sunset: Two minutes before the Sun disappears below the horizon.

Sunset (or sundown) is the disappearance of the Sun at the end of the Sun path, below the horizon of the Earth (or any other astronomical object in the Solar System) due to its rotation. As viewed from everywhere on Earth, it is a phenomenon that happens approximately once every 24 hours, except in areas close to the poles. The equinox Sun sets due west at the moment of both the spring and autumn equinoxes. As viewed from the Northern Hemisphere, the Sun sets to the northwest (or not at all) in the spring and summer, and to the southwest in the autumn and winter; these seasons are reversed for the Southern Hemisphere.

The sunset is defined in astronomy as the moment the upper limb of the Sun disappears below the horizon. Near the horizon, atmospheric refraction causes sunlight rays to be distorted to such an extent that geometrically the solar disk is already about one diameter below the horizon when a sunset is observed.

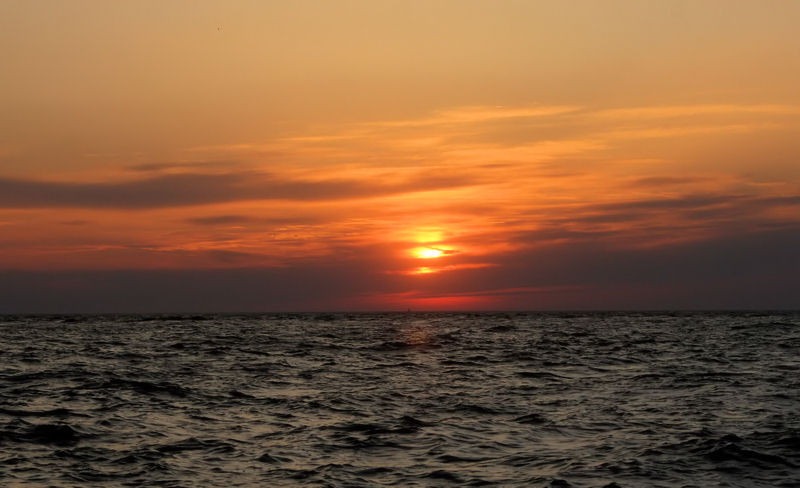
Sunset over the Delaware Bay at Sunset Beach, New Jersey, U.S., seen through cirrus clouds

Sunset is distinct from twilight, which is divided into three stages. The first one is civil twilight, which begins once the Sun has disappeared below the horizon, and continues until it descends to 6 degrees below the horizon. The early to intermediate stages of twilight coincide with predusk. The second phase is nautical twilight, between 6 and 12 degrees below the horizon. The third phase is astronomical twilight, which is the period when the Sun is between 12 and 18 degrees below the horizon. Dusk is at the very end of astronomical twilight, and is the darkest moment of twilight just before night. Finally, night occurs when the Sun reaches 18 degrees below the horizon and no longer illuminates the sky.

Locations farther north than the Arctic Circle and farther south than the Antarctic Circle experience no full sunset or sunrise on at least one day of the year, when the polar day or the polar night persists continuously for 24 hours. At latitudes greater than within half a degree of either pole, the sun cannot rise or set on the same date on any day of the year, since the sun's angular elevation between solar noon and midnight is less than one degree.

== Occurrence ==
Stages of the twilight period

Likewise, the same phenomenon exists in the Southern Hemisphere, but with the respective dates reversed, with the earliest sunsets occurring some time before June 21 in winter, and the latest sunsets occurring some time after December 21 in summer, again depending on one's southern latitude. For a few weeks surrounding both solstices, both sunrise and sunset get slightly later each day. Even on the equator, sunrise and sunset shift several minutes back and forth through the year, along with solar noon. These effects are plotted by an analemma.

Locations within the Arctic and Antarctic Circles experience periods where the Sun does not rise or set for 24 hours or more, known as polar day and polar night. These phenomena occur due to Earth’s axial tilt, causing continuous sunlight or darkness at certain times of the year.

== Location on the horizon ==
A video time lapse of a sunset in Tokyo

Approximate locations of sunset on the horizon (azimuth) as described above can be found in Refs. The figure on the right is calculated using the solar geometry routine as follows:

1. For a given latitude and a given date, calculate the declination of the Sun using $0^{\circ}$ longitude and solar noon time as inputs to the routine;
2. Calculate the sunset hour angle using the sunset equation;
3. Calculate the sunset time, which is the solar noon time plus the sunset hour angle in degree divided by 15;
4. Use the sunset time as input to the solar geometry routine to get the solar azimuth angle at sunset.

An interesting feature in the figure on the right is apparent hemispheric symmetry in regions where daily sunrise and sunset actually occur. This symmetry becomes clear if the hemispheric relation in sunrise equation is applied to the x- and y-components of the solar vector presented in Ref. Solar geometry routines that model solar azimuth angles at sunset permit the calculation using latitude, date, and time parameters to be done precisely.

== Colors ==
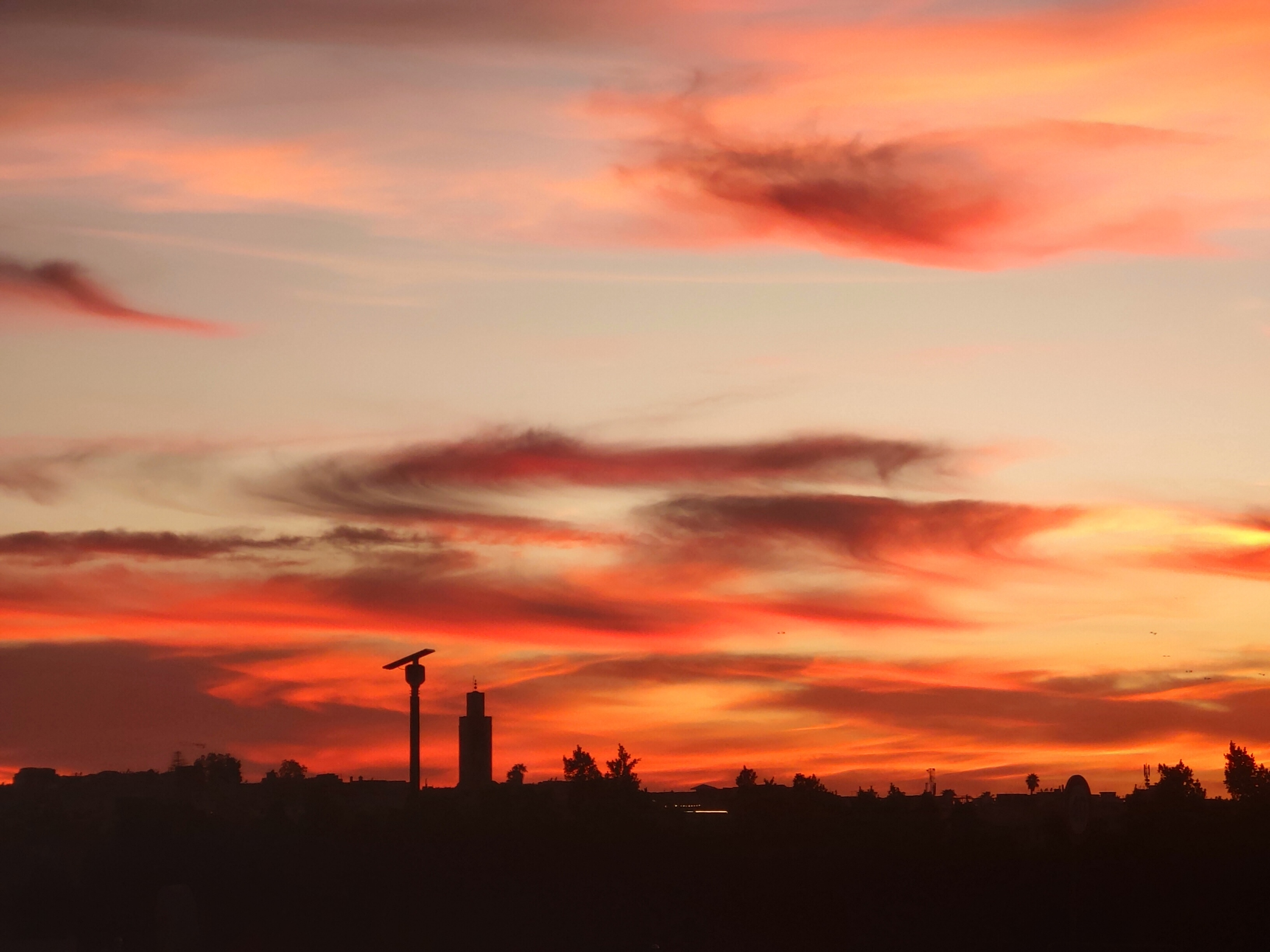
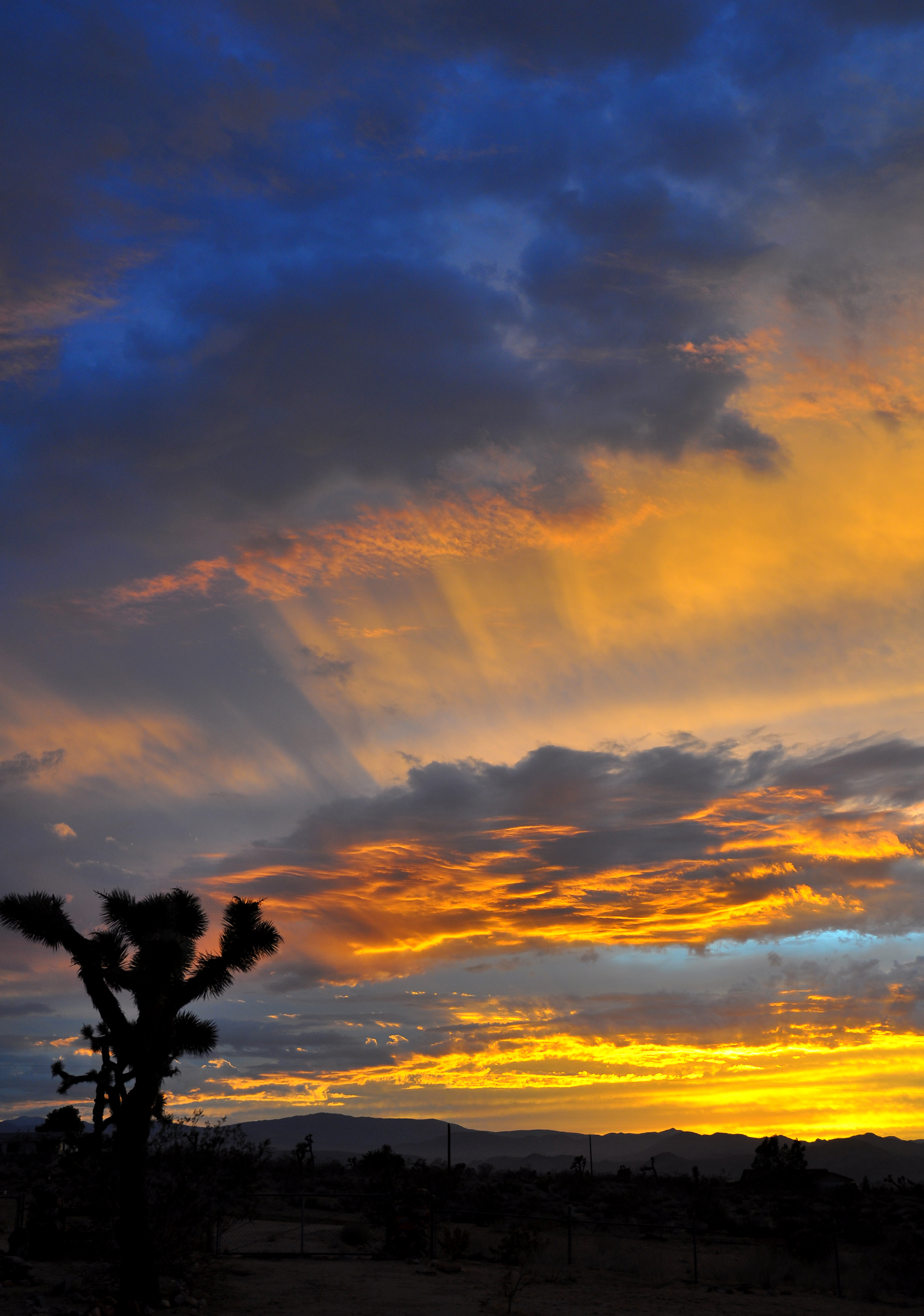
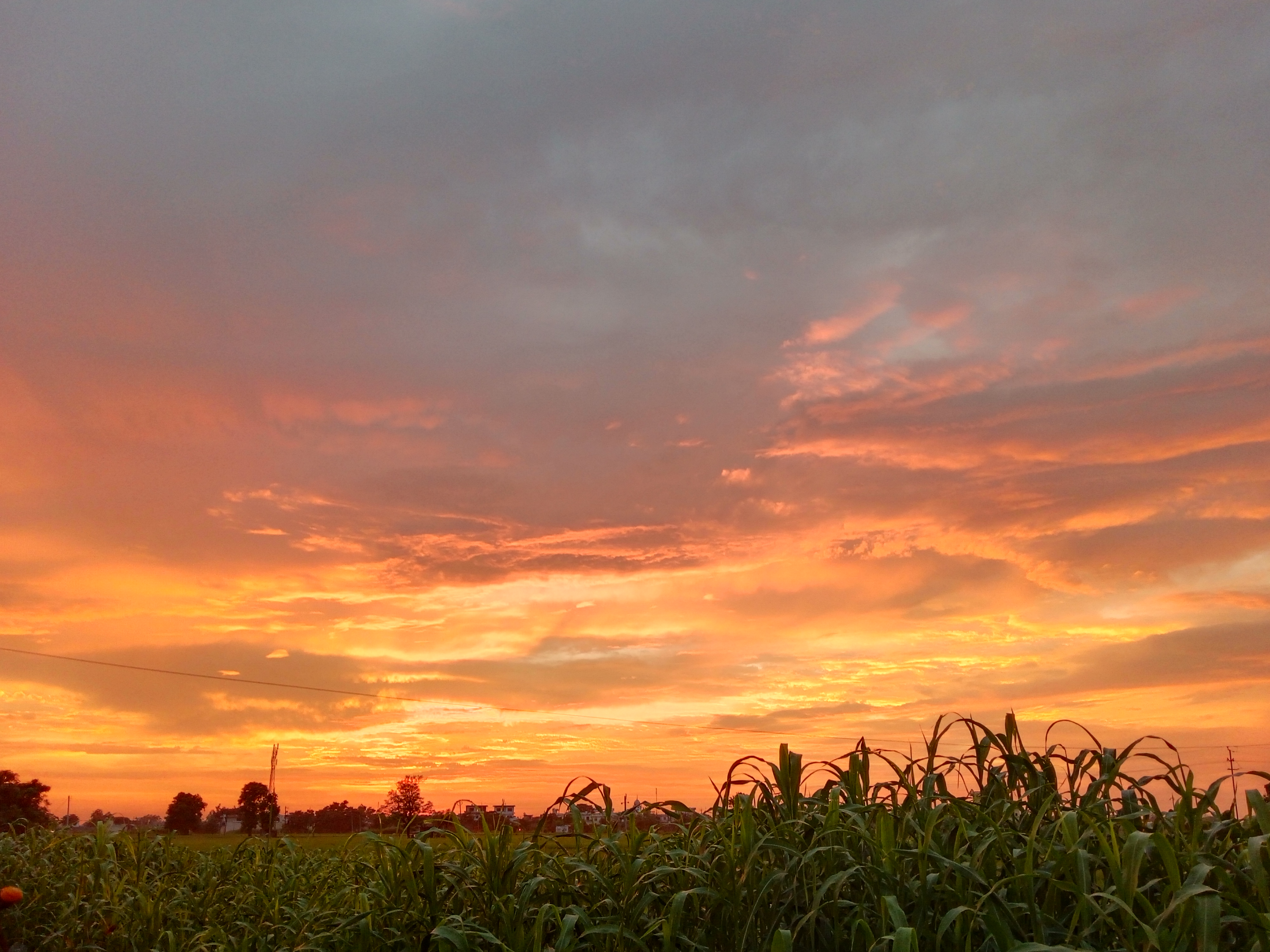
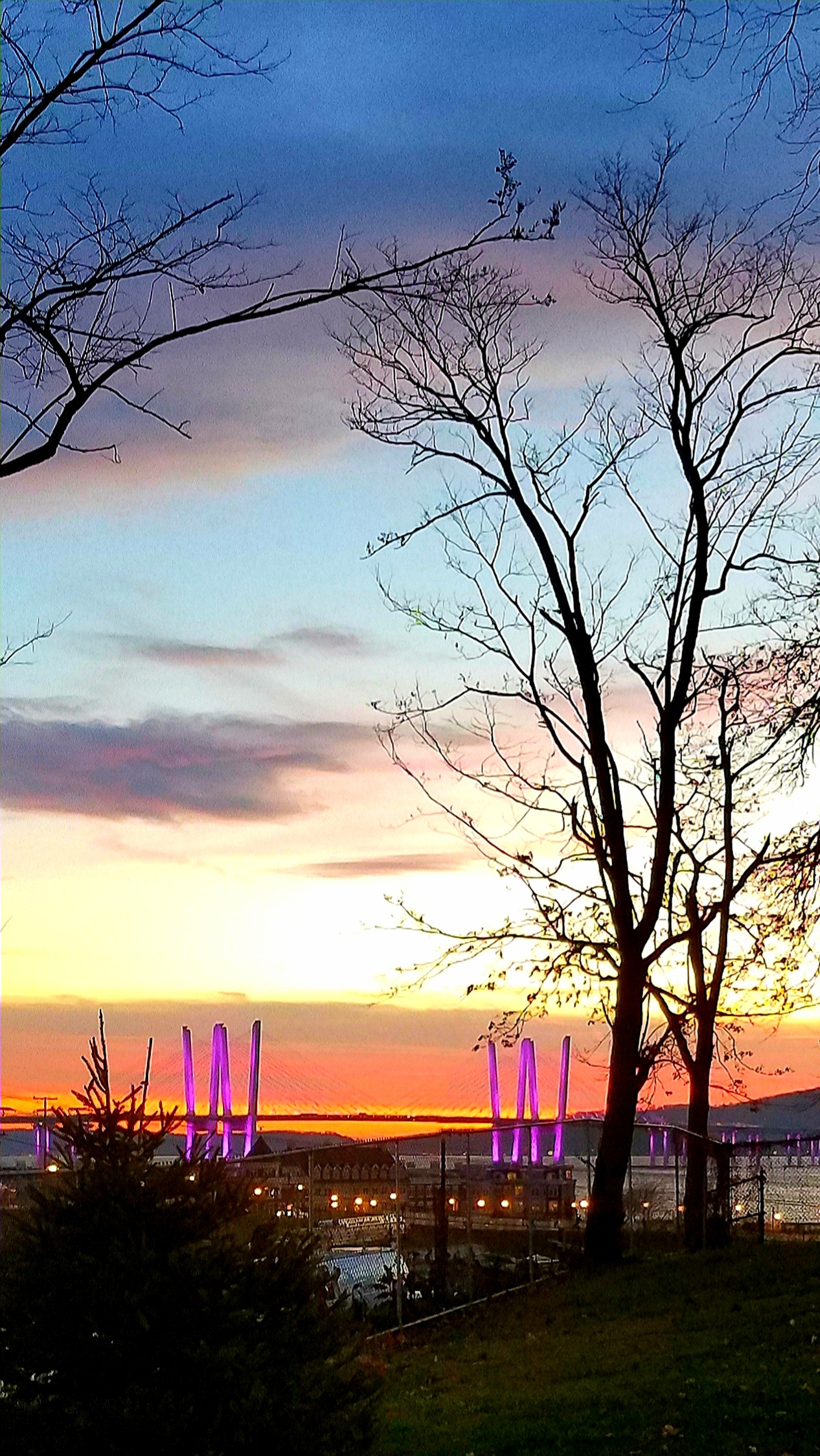
(1) Red clouds caused by Rayleigh scattering in Meknes, Morocco. (2) Twilight in Joshua Tree, California, showing warm sunlight and blue scattered light. (3) Golden sunlight illuminating cloud undersides. (4) Sunset in Sydney, Australia. (5) Sunset over the Tappan Zee Bridge on the Hudson River.

As a ray of white sunlight travels through the atmosphere to an observer, some of the colors are scattered out of the beam by air molecules and airborne particles, changing the final color of the beam the viewer sees. Because the shorter wavelength components, such as blue and green, scatter more strongly, these colors are preferentially removed from the beam. At sunrise and sunset, when the path through the atmosphere is longer, the blue and green components are removed almost completely, leaving the longer wavelength orange and red hues we see at those times. The remaining reddened sunlight can then be scattered by cloud droplets and other relatively large particles to light up the horizon red and orange. The removal of the shorter wavelengths of light is due to Rayleigh scattering by air molecules and particles much smaller than the wavelength of visible light (less than 50 nm in diameter). The scattering by cloud droplets and other particles with diameters comparable to or larger than the sunlight's wavelengths (> 600 nm) is due to Mie scattering and is not strongly wavelength-dependent. Mie scattering is responsible for the light scattered by clouds, and also for the daytime halo of white light around the Sun (forward scattering of white light).

Sunset colors are typically more brilliant than sunrise colors, because the evening air contains more particles than morning air. Sometimes just before sunrise or after sunset a green flash can be seen.

== Historical view ==
The 16th-century astronomer Nicolaus Copernicus was the first to present to the world a detailed and eventually widely accepted mathematical model supporting the premise that the Earth is moving and the Sun actually stays still, despite the impression from our point of view of a moving Sun.

== Planets ==
Sunsets on other planets appear different because of differences in the distance of the planet from the Sun and non-existent or differing atmospheric compositions.

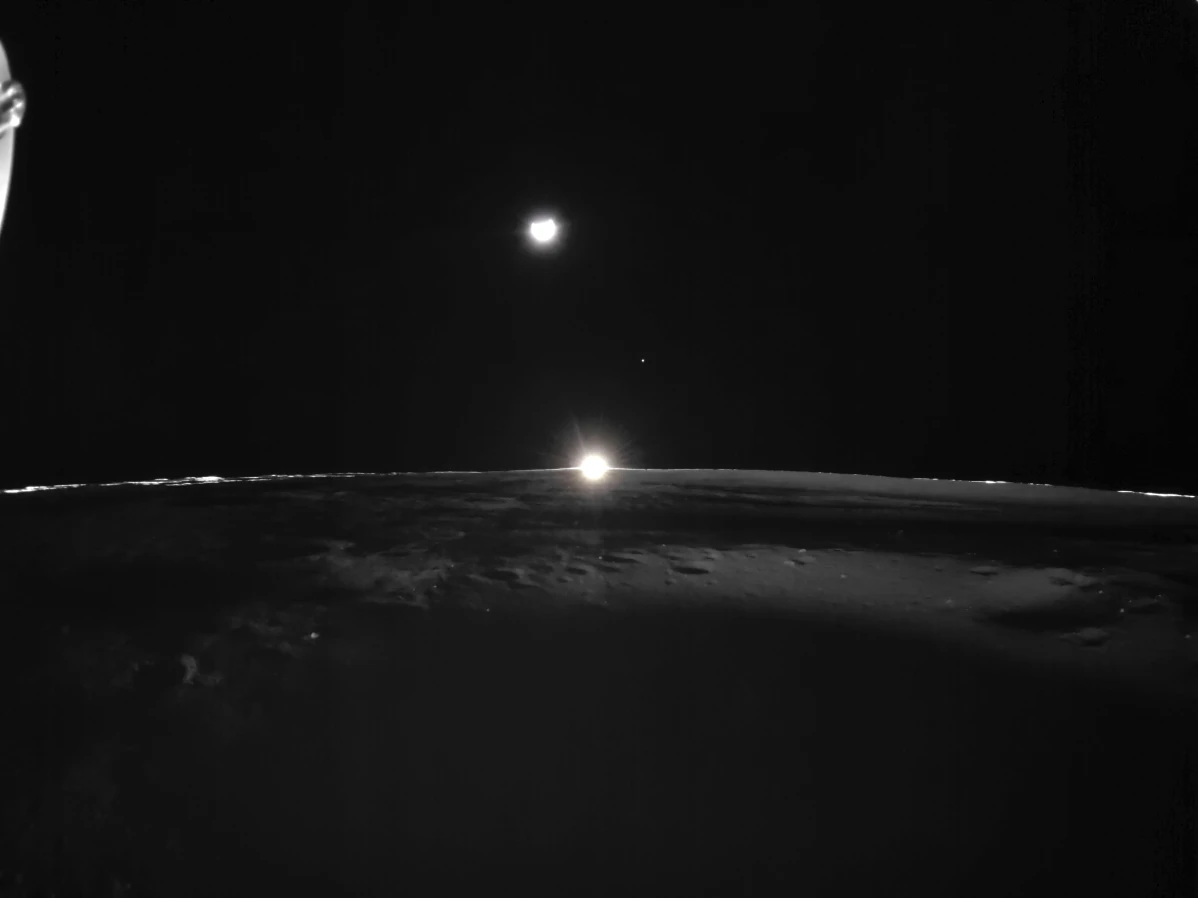
Sunset on the moon captured by Blue Ghost.

=== The Moon ===
On the Moon, due to the lack of an atmosphere, a sunset differs from earth due to the lack of atmosphere, making the change from light to dark less noticeable. Due to the tidal locking of the Moon to the Earth, it lasts longer, though not completely dark sometimes due to Earthshine.

=== Mars ===
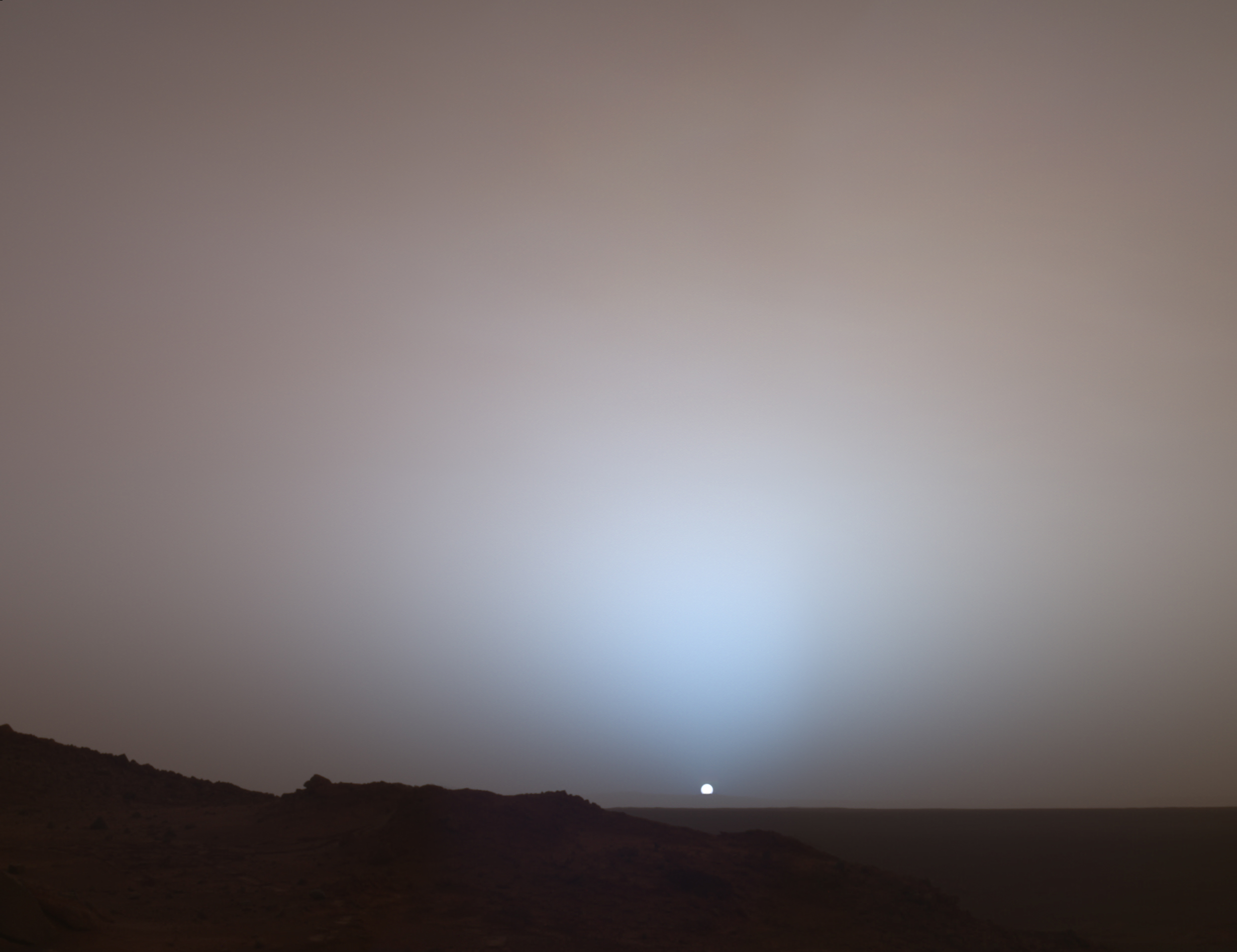
Sunset on Mars captured by the Mars rover Spirit.

On Mars, the setting Sun appears about two-thirds the size it does from Earth, due to the greater distance between Mars and the Sun. The colors are typically hues of blue, but some Martian sunsets last significantly longer and appear far redder than is typical on Earth. The colors of the Martian sunset differ from those on Earth. Mars has a thin atmosphere, lacking oxygen and nitrogen, so the light scattering is not dominated by a Rayleigh Scattering process. Instead, the air is full of red dust, blown into the atmosphere by high winds, so its sky color is mainly determined by a Mie Scattering process, resulting in more blue hues than an Earth sunset. One study also reported that Martian dust high in the atmosphere can reflect sunlight up to two hours after the Sun has set, casting a diffuse glow across the surface of Mars.

== Cultural significance ==
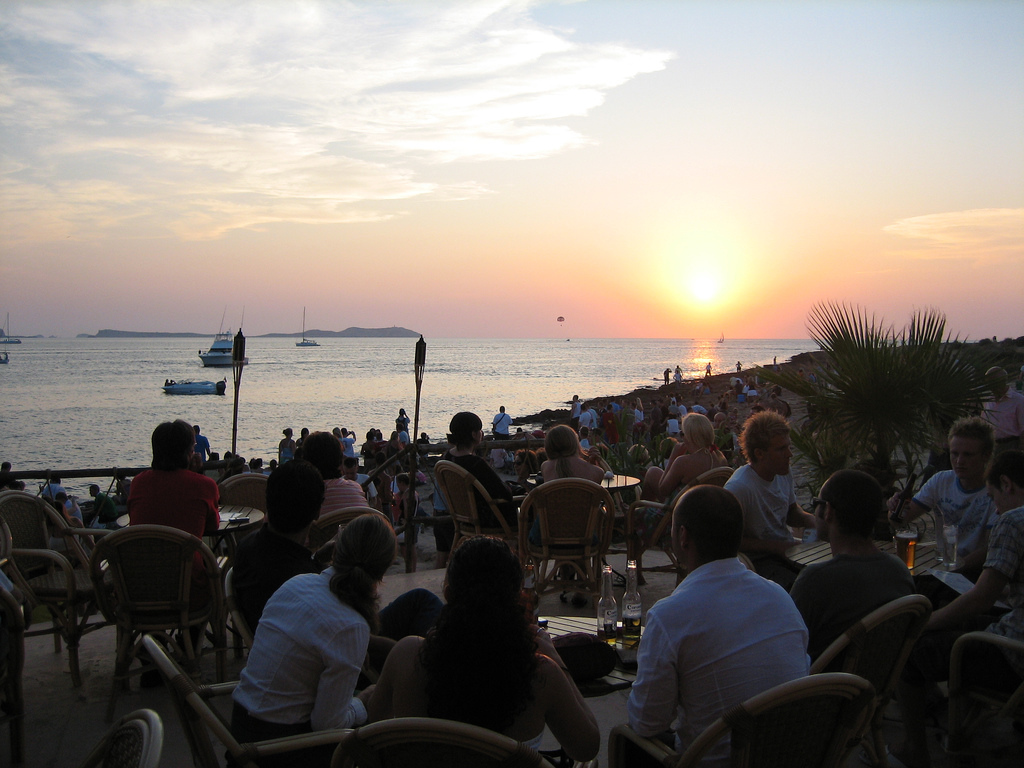
People watching the sunset from Café del Mar, Sant Antoni de Portmany, Ibiza, Spain.

Sunsets are an example of a natural phenomenon often considered beautiful by humans, and they are a common subject of visual artworks and in photography.

In the Hebrew calendar, the Islamic calendar, and the Bahá'í calendar, and in Orthodox Christianity the day starts at sunset.

== See also ==
- Dawn
- Diffuse sky radiation
- Earth's shadow, visible at sunset
- Golden hour (photography)
- Heliacal setting
- Sundown town
