= Hawangdi =

Hwangdi ह्वाङ्दी
- Village Development Committee
- Location in Nepal
- Coordinates: 28.24°N 83.11°E
- Country: Nepal
- Province: Lumbini Province
- District: Gulmi District

Population (1991)
  - Total: 1,688
- Time zone: UTC+5:45 (Nepal Time)

Hwangdi is a village and ward in Gulmi District in the Lumbini Province of western Nepal. At the time of the 1991 Nepal census it had a population of 1688 persons living in 331 individual households.
