= Neta, Gulmi =

Coordinates: 28°13′N 83°12′E

Neta, Nepal नेटा
- Village Development Committee
- Interactive map of Neta, Nepal
- Country: Nepal
- Zone: Lumbini Zone
- District: Gulmi District

Population (1991)
  - Total: 2,375
- Time zone: UTC+5:45 (Nepal Time)

Neta is a village and municipality in Gulmi District in the Lumbini Zone of central Nepal. At the time of the 1991 Nepal census it had a population of 2375 persons residing in 451 individual households.
