= Sunrise equation =

Equation to derive time of sunset and sunrise

A contour plot of the hours of daylight as a function of latitude and day of the year, using the most accurate models described in this article. It can be seen that the area of constant day and constant night reach up to the polar circles (here labeled "Anta. c." and "Arct. c."), which is a consequence of the earth's inclination.

A plot of hours of daylight as a function of the date for changing latitudes. This plot was created using the simple sunrise equation, approximating the sun as a single point and does not take into account effects caused by the atmosphere or the diameter of the Sun.

The sunrise equation or sunset equation can be used to derive the time of sunrise or sunset for any solar declination and latitude in terms of local solar time when sunrise and sunset actually occur.

== Geometric equation ==
The time at which a celestial object crosses the horizon can be calculated by converting its coordinates from the equatorial coordinate system to the horizontal coordinate system, and then solving the equation for an altitude of zero. We then obtain

$$\cos H_0 = -\tan \phi \, \tan \delta$$

where:

- $H_0$ is the solar hour angle at either sunrise (when the negative value is taken) or sunset (when the positive value is taken);
- $\phi$ is the latitude of the observer on the Earth;
- $\delta$ is the Sun's declination.

This gives the geometric rise or set time (ignoring refraction) of the center of the Sun. See below for an equation which accounts for these effects.

The Earth rotates at an angular velocity of 15°/hour. Therefore, the expression $H_0 / \mathrm{15}^\circ$, where $H_0$ is in degrees, gives the interval of time in hours from sunrise to local solar noon or from local solar noon to sunset.

The sign convention is that the observer latitude $\phi$ is 0 at the equator, positive for the Northern Hemisphere and negative for the Southern Hemisphere, and the solar declination $\delta$ is 0 when the Sun is exactly above the equator, positive during the Northern Hemisphere summer and negative during the Northern Hemisphere winter.The declination of the Sun is nearly, but not exactly, zero at the equinoxes.

The equation has no solution when $|\tan \phi \, \tan \delta | > 1$. This occurs north of the Arctic Circle or south of the Antarctic Circle, during the polar night, when the Sun is not visible above the horizon at local midday.

=== Hemispheric relation ===
Suppose $\phi_{N}$ is a given latitude in Northern Hemisphere, and $H_N$ is the corresponding sunrise hour angle that has a negative value, and similarly, $\phi_{S}$ is the same latitude but in Southern Hemisphere, which means $\phi_{S}=-\phi_{N}$, and $H_S$ is the corresponding sunrise hour angle, then it is apparent that

$$\cos H_S=-\cos H_N=\cos (-180^\circ - H_N)$$,

which means

$$H_N + H_S = -180^{\circ}$$.

The above relation implies that on the same day, the lengths of daytime from sunrise to sunset at $\phi_{N}$ and $\phi_{S}$ sum to 24 hours if $\phi_{S}=-\phi_{N}$, and this also applies to regions where polar days and polar nights occur. This further suggests that the global average of length of daytime on any given day is 12 hours without considering the effect of atmospheric refraction.

== Generalized equation ==
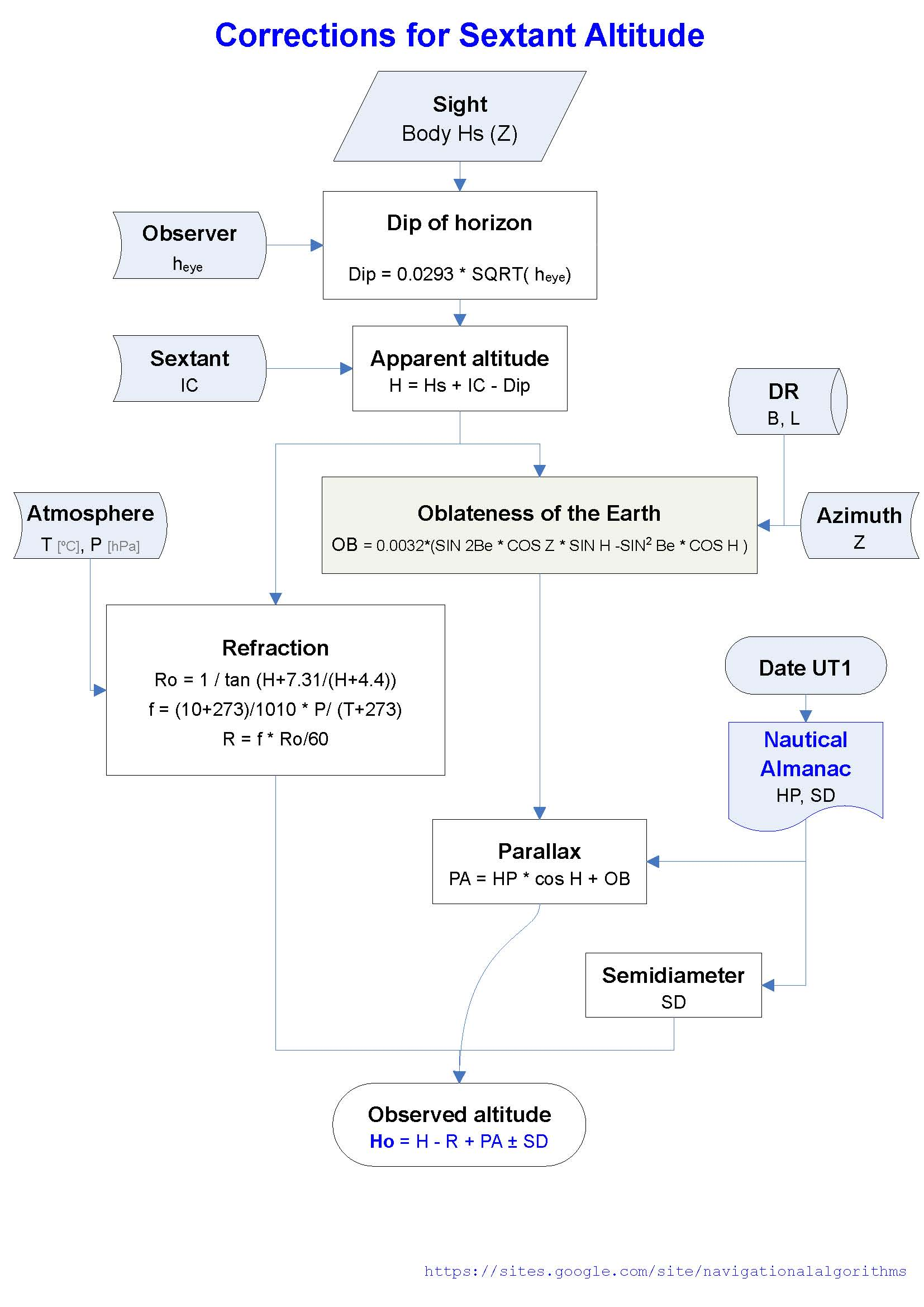
Sextant sight reduction procedure showing solar altitude corrections for refraction and elevation.

The equation above neglects the influence of atmospheric refraction and the non-zero angle subtended by the solar disc — i.e. the apparent diameter of the sun. The times of the rising and the setting of the upper solar limb as given in astronomical almanacs correct for this by using the more general equation:

$$\cos H_0 = \dfrac{\sin h_0 - \sin \phi \, \sin \delta}{\cos \phi \, \cos \delta }$$

where $h_0$ is the geometric altitude angle of the center of the Sun at the time of rising or setting, which is approximately −0.833° or −50.0 arcminutes, although the exact figure depends on atmospheric conditions along the line of sight.

This equation, as given by Jean Meeus, can be also used for any other solar altitude. The NOAA provides additional approximate expressions for refraction corrections at these other altitudes. There are also alternative formulations, such as a non-piecewise expression by G.G. Bennett used in the U.S. Naval Observatory's "Vector Astronomy Software".

The dip of the horizon in radians, including refraction and the geometric correction for the observer's height above the apparent horizon, can be approximated by:

$$\psi = \sqrt{2 \frac{h}{R_0} (1 - k)}$$

where h is the height of the observer, $R_0$is the radius of the Earth, and k is the ratio of the radius of the ray's curvature to the radius of the Earth. This assumes that light rays follow a circular path, which is approximately true when the lapse rate is constant. For a typical value of k of 0.17, this gives

$$\psi = 1.75^\prime \sqrt{\text{height in metres}}$$

or

$$\psi = 0.97^\prime \sqrt{\text{height in feet}}$$

where the prime ($^\prime$) indicates arcminutes, i.e. 1/60 °. This should be subtracted from the altitude angle. In summary, at sunrise or sunset:

$$h_0 = -s - \psi$$

where s is the semidiameter of the Sun, about 16 arcminutes.

== In Universal Time ==
To calculate the time of the sunrise in Universal Time, Meeus recommends the following procedure. The position of the Sun in equatorial coordinates should first be calculated or looked up for the day of interest. For the day D, find:

- $\theta_0$: the apparent sidereal time (or Earth Rotation Angle) at 0h Universal Time on day $D$,
- $\alpha_1$ and $\delta_1$, the right ascension and declination on day $D - 1$ at 0h Universal Time,
- $\alpha_2$ and $\delta_2$, the right ascension and declination on day $D$,
- $\alpha_3$ and $\delta_3$, the right ascension and declination on day $D + 1$.

Calculate the approximate time of the sunset using

$$\cos H_0 = \dfrac{\sin h_0 - \sin \phi \, \sin \delta_2}{\cos \phi \, \cos \delta_2 }.$$

If the right hand side has an absolute value greater than 1, then the Sun does not go below the horizon on that day and $H_0$ does not exist.

Calculate the transit, sunrise and sunset time in fractions of a day:

- $m_0 = \frac{\alpha_2 + L - \theta_0}{360^{\circ}}$
- $m_1 = m_0 - \frac{H_0}{360^{\circ}}$
- $m_2 = m_0 + \frac{H_0}{360^{\circ}}$

where L is the geographical longitude expressed as an angle increasing westwards from Greenwich, i.e. the opposite sign convention than is typically used in geography.

These values of m can be multiplied by 24 to give the time of each event in hours, accurate to about ±0.01 days (14 minutes). For greater accuracy, the elevation angle of the Sun should be calculated at the proposed time, and then an adjustment applied to bring it to the desired elevation. The adjustment is:

$$\Delta m = \frac{h - h_0}{360^{\circ} \cos \delta \cos \phi \sin H}$$

where

- $H = \theta - L - \alpha$ is the hour angle,
- $\theta = \theta_0 + 360.985647^\circ m$ is the sidereal time at Greenwich in degrees,
- h is the altitude of the Sun in degrees at m,
- $\alpha$ is the result of linear interpolation between $\alpha_1$, $\alpha_2$ and $\alpha_3$,
- $\delta$ is similarly interpolated between $\delta_1$, $\delta_2$ and $\delta_3$.

The final time is then $m + \Delta m$.

Temperature variations in the atmosphere unpredictably affect the amount of refraction, limiting accuracy to about two minutes.

== See also ==
- Daytime
- Equation of time
