= Shiv Narayan Agnihotri =

Hindu social reformer

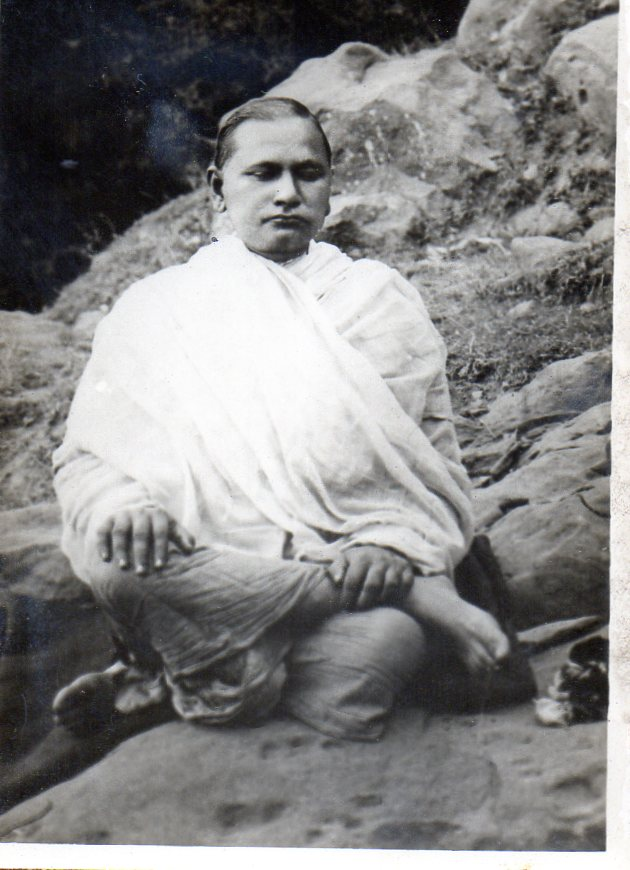
- Born: 20 December 1850; Akbarpur, Kanpur Dehat, (Uttar Pradesh)
- Died: 3 April 1929 (aged 78); Lahore, Punjab
- Other name: Satyanand Agnihotri
- Occupations: Religious philosopher, public speaker, writer, journalist
- Known for: Founder and Guru of the Dev Samaj, formerly a Brahmo Samaj leader

Pandit Shiv Narayan Agnihotri (20 December 1850 – 3 April 1929) was a Hindu social reformer who emerged as a leading member of the Brahmo Samaj (Society of God), a Hindu reform movement. He broke from Brahmoism in 1886 to form his own religious group, the Dev Samaj (Divine Society).

== Early life ==
Born into a family of Brahmins in Akbarpur, Uttar Pradesh, Agnihotri entered the Thomason College of Engineering in Roorkee at the age of sixteen. In 1873, he settled in Lahore where he took up a position as a drawing master at the Government School and joined the Brahmo Samaj, quickly rising as a major figure within the movement. In 1882, he resigned from his teaching position to commit himself fully to the movement. As a Brahmo Samaj leader, Agnihotri engaged in theological disputes with the Arya Samaj movement and in polemical exchanges especially with its founder Dayanand Saraswati. Though he opposed the latter as a Brahmo Samaj proponent, his own eventual dissatisfaction with its ideology resulted in ideological friction with other Brahmo leaders which, by 1887, led to a complete break with the movement.

== Dev Samaj ==
On 16 February 1887 Agnihotri founded the Dev Samaj, rejecting Brahmo rationalism and drawing on the concept of the Guru as an enlightened soul as its central tenet, while retaining elements of Brahmo reformism. Combining a strict moral code with social radicalism, Agnihotri advocated vegetarianism, the social integration of castes, the education of women, widow remarriage and the elimination of child marriage. Adultery, polygamy and other 'unnatural crimes' were outlawed and hard work was stressed with members being urged to lead a useful life and shun excessive ceremonial expenses.

The Dev Samaj followed the philosophy propounded by the founder in 4 religious texts named as Dev Shastra volumes 1 to 4 and on the person of its Guru, Agnihotri, who held all doctrinal authority. Though initially upholding the worship of God, from 1892 Agnihotri advocated dual worship of himself and God claiming a status of near divinity. He asserted that he had attained the highest possible plane of existence and that eternal bliss could only be attained with his guidance. While retaining the nature of a cult, by 1895 Dev Samaj underwent a new development and became essentially non-theistic in its ideology when Agnihotri rejected the worship of God and taught instead that the Religious Philosophy as written in the Dev Shastra volume 1 to 4 and Guru were for attention for its members.

Agnihotri was active as a writer and journalist and was a dramatic speaker. His main target of criticism remained the Arya Samaj and he was able to produce a large volume of propagandist literature throughout his life. His teachings gained influence mostly among educated Hindus in the Punjab who came to view him as their Guru. The Dev Samaj peaked in early twentieth-century Punjab as a "Science Grounded Religion" with 3,597 members in 1921, but declined following Agnihotri's death in 1929.

== See also ==
- Brahmo Samaj
- Hindu reform movements
- Dayananda Saraswati
