= Wagla =

Wagla वाग्ला
- Village Development Committee
- Location in Nepal
- Coordinates: 28.16°N 83.12°E
- Country: Nepal
- Zone: Lumbini Zone
- District: Gulmi District

Population (1991)
  - Total: 2,736
- Time zone: UTC+5:45 (Nepal Time)

Wagla is a village and VDC in Gulmi District in the Lumbini Zone of Western Nepal. At the time of the 1991 Nepal census it had a population of 2736 persons living in 510 individual households.

'''Ward of the wagla VDC.'''

Name of the ward	No. of the ward
1.chautara	1
2. Tersabata	2
3.Ghoramaare	3
4. Afra	3
5. Amile	4
6. Fulbari	4
7.Lahata	5
8.Dadaka chaupari	6
9.Dwaneta	7
10. Bhujunge	7
11.Gupha	8
12.Gadapari	8
13.Lakuri	8
14. RaktePokhari	9
15, Thyapche	9

These are the popular place in Wagla VDC in Gulmi District .
