= Shakti Ballav Aryal =

Nepalese writer

- Born: Gorkha Kingdom
- Occupations: Writer and Hindu priest
- Notable work: Hansyakadamba (transl. 1789)

Shakti Ballav Aryal (Nepali: शक्तिबल्लभ अर्याल; also known as Shakti Ballav Arjyal or Shakti Ballabh Aryal) was a Nepalese writer, translator, and a Hindu priest.

Aryal has translated numerous Sanskrit works in the Nepali-language including Mahabharat Virat Parva (1771), and Hansyakadamba (1789).

He first wrote Hansyakadamba in Sanskrit and later translated it to Nepali. Aryal served as royal priest to Prithvi Narayan Shah, and Pratap Singh Shah.

His nephew Udayananda Aryal, and Radha Ballav Aryal were also writers.

In 2017, Shakti Ballav Aryal and Bhanubhakta Acharya were praised as their work "laid the adamant foundation for Nepali literature". Aryal was also described to be a "pioneer in humour".

== Works ==
- Tanahun Bhakundo (1762)
- Mahabharat Virat Parva (1771)
- Hansyakadamba (1789)
