= Agnishala, Patan =

Temple in Lalitpur, Nepal

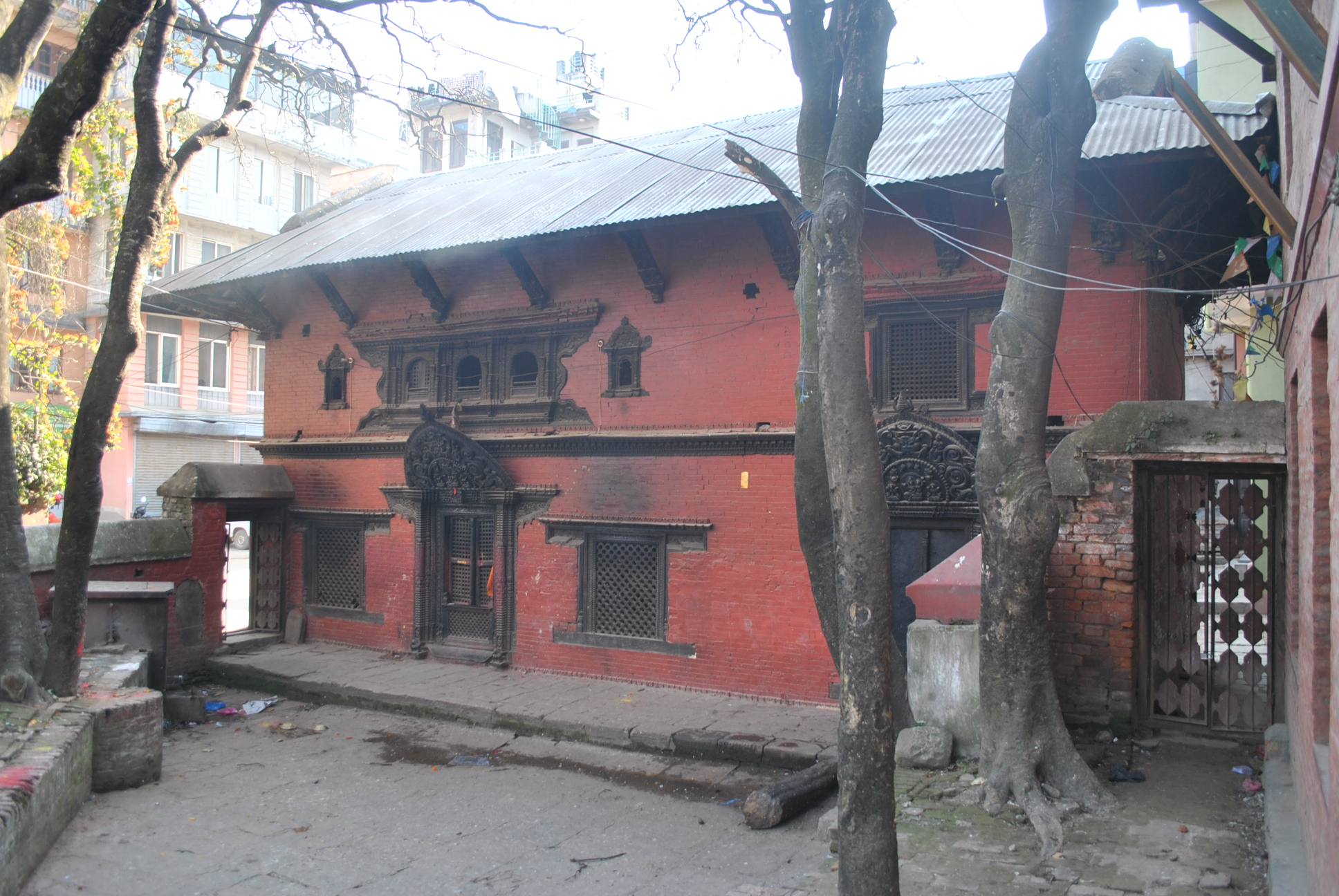

Agnishala, Patan (Agniśālā aka Agnimatha or Agiṃmatha) is known as the temple of eternal fire, mostly worshiped by Newars of Kathmandu valley. It is located at Thabu near Kumaripati, Lalitpur.
