= Kaami people =

Nepali ethnic group

The Bishwakarma people are a Nepali ethnic group. They are found almost everywhere in Nepal, but are less common in the Eastern region than the west. There are many castes inside Bishwakarma people like Rishal, Nagarkoti, Sunar, etc. Rishal main occupation is working on gold and silver.
