= Arkhawang =

Arkhawang अर्खवाङ
- Village Development Committee
- Location in Nepal
- Coordinates: 28.22°N 83.13°E
- Country: Nepal
- Zone: Lumbini Zone
- District: Gulmi District

Population (2011)
  - Total: 1,511
- Time zone: UTC+5:45 (Nepal Time)

Arkhawang is a village and municipality in Gulmi District in the Lumbini Zone of central Nepal. At the time of the 2011 Nepal census it had a population of 1511 people living in 310 individual households.
