= Arje =

Arjai अर्जे
- Village Development Committee
- Location in Nepal
- Coordinates: 28.18°N 83.18°E
- Country: Nepal
- Zone: Lumbini Zone
- District: Gulmi District

Population (1991)
  - Total: 2,239
- Time zone: UTC+5:45 (Nepal Time)

Arje is a village and municipality in Gulmi District in the Lumbini Zone of central Nepal. At the time of the 1991 Nepal census it had a population of 2239 persons living in 427 individual households. Arje village is recognized as an ancestral homeland of the Aryal clan.
