= Sunrise =

Time of day when the sun appears above the horizon

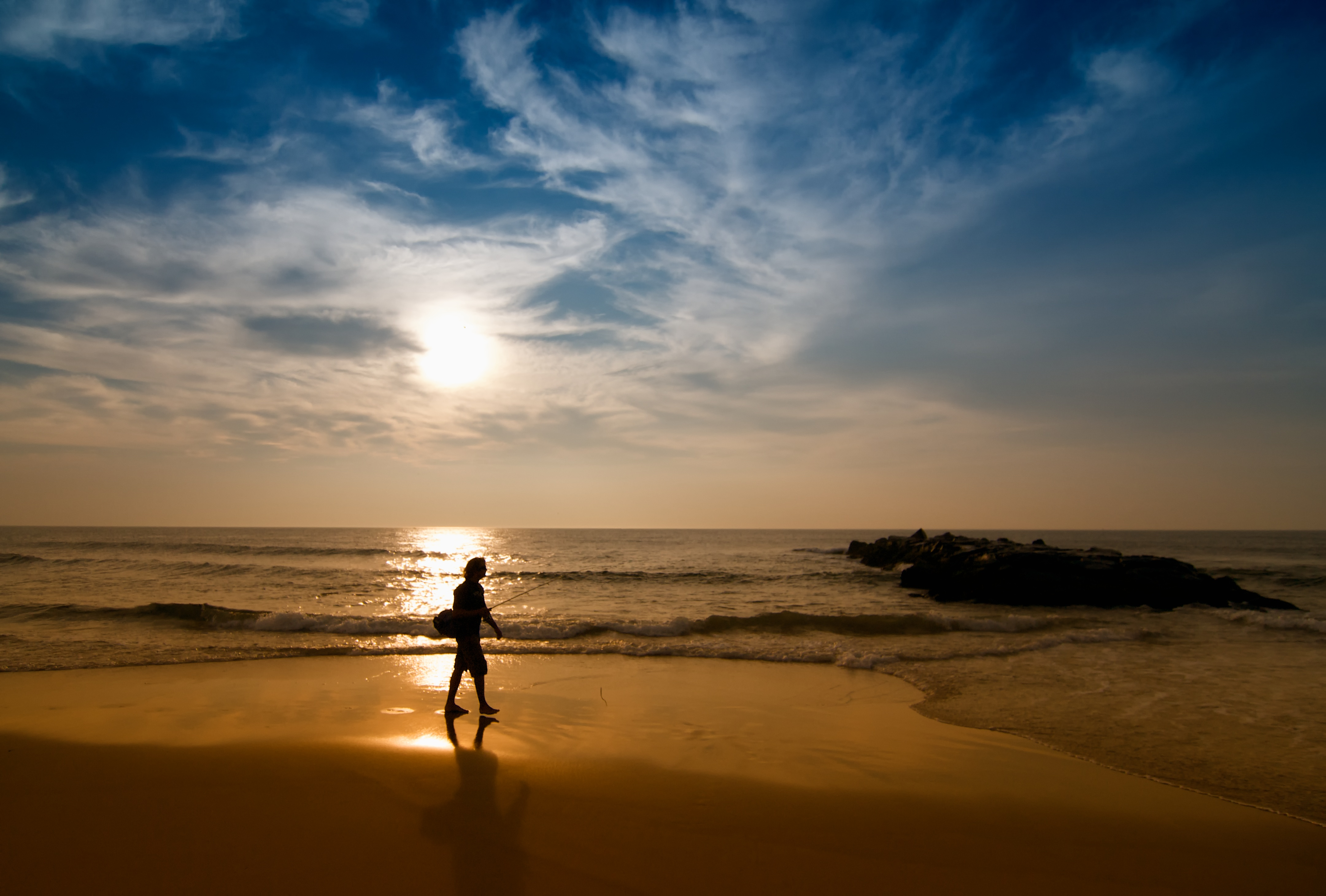
Sunrise seen over the Atlantic Ocean through cirrus clouds on the Jersey Shore at Spring Lake, New Jersey, U.S.

Sunrise (or sunup) is the moment when the upper rim of the Sun appears on the horizon in the morning, at the start of the Sun path. The term can also refer to the entire process of the solar disk crossing the horizon.

== Terminology ==
Although the Sun appears to "rise" from the horizon, it is actually the Earth's motion that causes the Sun to appear. The illusion of a moving Sun results from Earth observers being in a rotating reference frame; this apparent motion caused many cultures to have mythologies and religions built around the geocentric model, which prevailed until astronomer Nicolaus Copernicus formulated his heliocentric model in the 16th century.

Architect Buckminster Fuller proposed the terms "sunsight" and "sunclipse" to better represent the heliocentric model, though the terms have not entered into common language.

Astronomically, sunrise occurs for only an instant, namely the moment at which the upper limb of the Sun appears tangent to the horizon. However, the term sunrise commonly refers to periods of time both before and after this point:

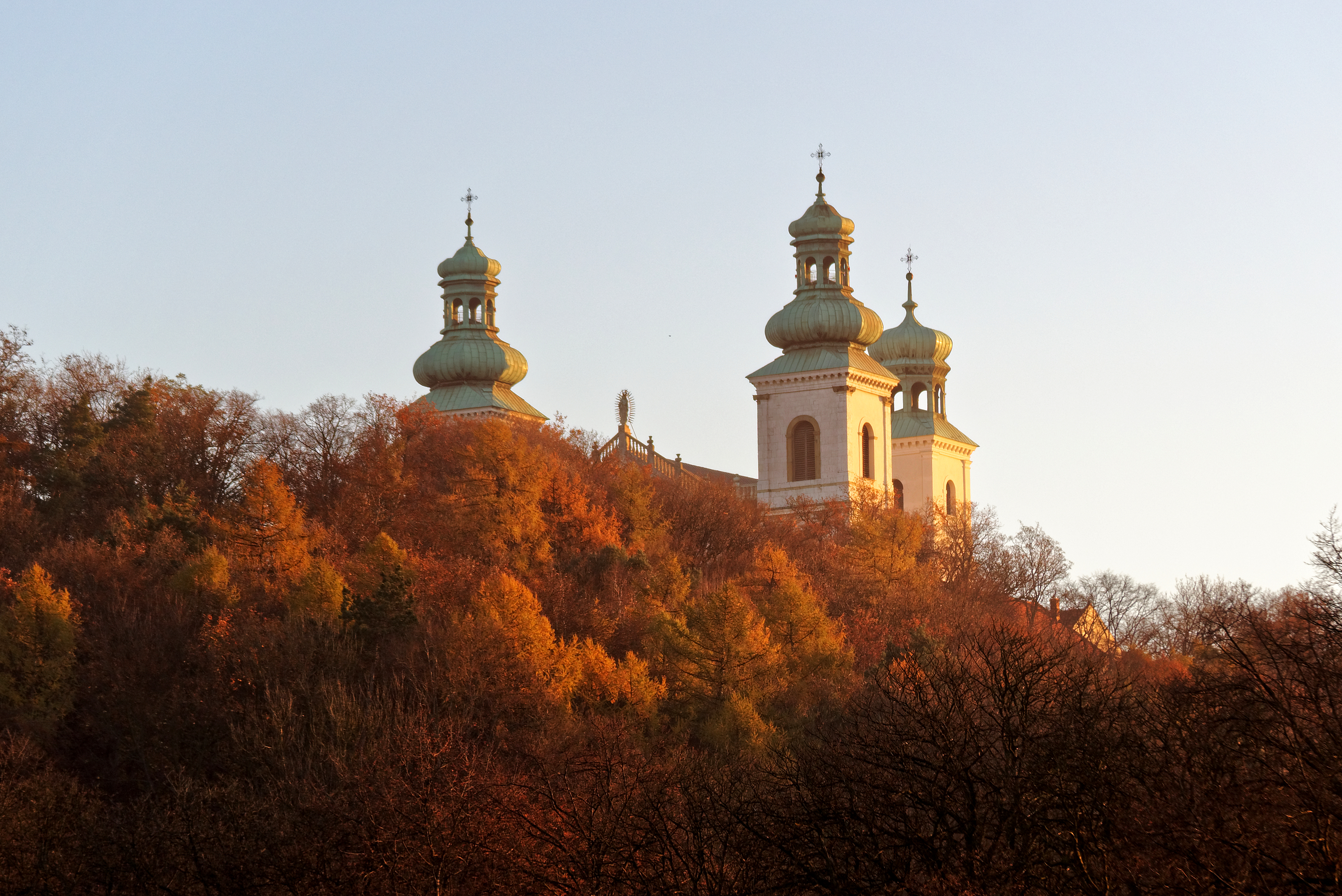
Towers of the Church of the Assumption in Bielany-Kraków over the Wolski Forest just after sunrise.

- Twilight, the period in the morning during which the sky is brightening, but the Sun is not yet visible. The beginning of morning twilight is called astronomical dawn.
- The period after the Sun rises during which striking colors and atmospheric effects are still seen. Civil twilight being the brightest, while astronomical twilight being the darkest.

== Measurement ==
=== Angle with respect to horizon ===
This diagram of the Sun at sunrise (or sunset) shows the effects of atmospheric refraction.

The stage of sunrise known as false sunrise actually occurs before the Sun truly reaches the horizon because Earth's atmosphere refracts the Sun's image. At the horizon, the average amount of refraction is 34 arcminutes, though this amount varies based on atmospheric conditions.

Also, unlike most other solar measurements, sunrise occurs when the Sun's upper limb, rather than its center, appears to cross the horizon. The apparent radius of the Sun at the horizon is 16 arcminutes.

Sunrise seen over the roads of Badagry, Lagos Nigeria

These two angles combine to define sunrise to occur when the Sun's center is 50 arcminutes below the horizon, or 90.83° from the zenith.

=== Time of day ===
Time of sunrise in 2008 for Libreville, Gabon. Near the equator, the variation of the time of sunrise is mainly governed by the variation of the equation of time. See here for the sunrise chart of a different location.

The timing of sunrise varies throughout the year and is also affected by the viewer's latitude and longitude, altitude, and time zone. These changes are driven by the axial tilt of Earth, daily rotation of the Earth, the planet's movement in its annual elliptical orbit around the Sun, and the Earth and Moon's paired revolutions around each other. The analemma can be used to make approximate predictions of the time of sunrise.

In late winter and spring, sunrise as seen from temperate latitudes occurs earlier each day, reaching its earliest time shortly before the summer solstice; although the exact date varies by latitude. After this point, the time of sunrise gets later each day, reaching its latest shortly after the winter solstice, also varying by latitude. The offset between the dates of the solstice and the earliest or latest sunrise time is caused by the eccentricity of Earth's orbit and the tilt of its axis, and is described by the analemma, which can be used to predict the dates.

Variations in atmospheric refraction can alter the time of sunrise by changing its apparent position. Near the poles, the time-of-day variation is extreme, since the Sun crosses the horizon at a very shallow angle and thus rises more slowly.

Accounting for atmospheric refraction and measuring from the leading edge slightly increases the average duration of day relative to night. The sunrise equation, however, which is used to derive the time of sunrise and sunset, uses the Sun's physical center for calculation, neglecting atmospheric refraction and the non-zero angle subtended by the solar disc.

=== Location on the horizon ===
Timelapse video of twilight and sunrise in Gjøvik, Norway in February 2021

Neglecting the effects of refraction and the Sun's non-zero size, whenever sunrise occurs, in temperate regions it is always in the northeast quadrant from the March equinox to the September equinox and in the southeast quadrant from the September equinox to the March equinox. Sunrises occur approximately due east on the March and September equinoxes for all viewers on Earth. Exact calculations of the azimuths of sunrise on other dates are complex, but they can be estimated with reasonable accuracy by using the analemma.

The figure on the right is calculated using the solar geometry routine in Ref. as follows:

1. For a given latitude and a given date, calculate the declination of the Sun using $0^{\circ}$ longitude and solar noon time as inputs to the routine;
2. Calculate the sunrise hour angle using the sunrise equation;
3. Calculate the sunrise time, which is the solar noon time minus the sunrise hour angle in degree divided by 15;
4. Use the sunrise time as input to the solar geometry routine to get the solar azimuth angle at sunrise.

On the Earth, the Sun is seen to rise in the east during the morning. However, this is not always true for other planets. On Venus, the retrograde rotation with respect to the orbit means that the morning Sun would appear to rise in the west. For Mercury, when the planet is near perihelion the Sun can appear to move in a retrograde manner, so during this period it can rise in the west.

==== Hemispheric symmetry ====
An interesting feature in the figure on the right is apparent hemispheric symmetry in regions where daily sunrise and sunset actually occur.

This symmetry becomes clear if the hemispheric relation in to the sunrise equation is applied to the x- and y-components of the solar vector presented in Ref.

== Appearance ==
=== Colors ===
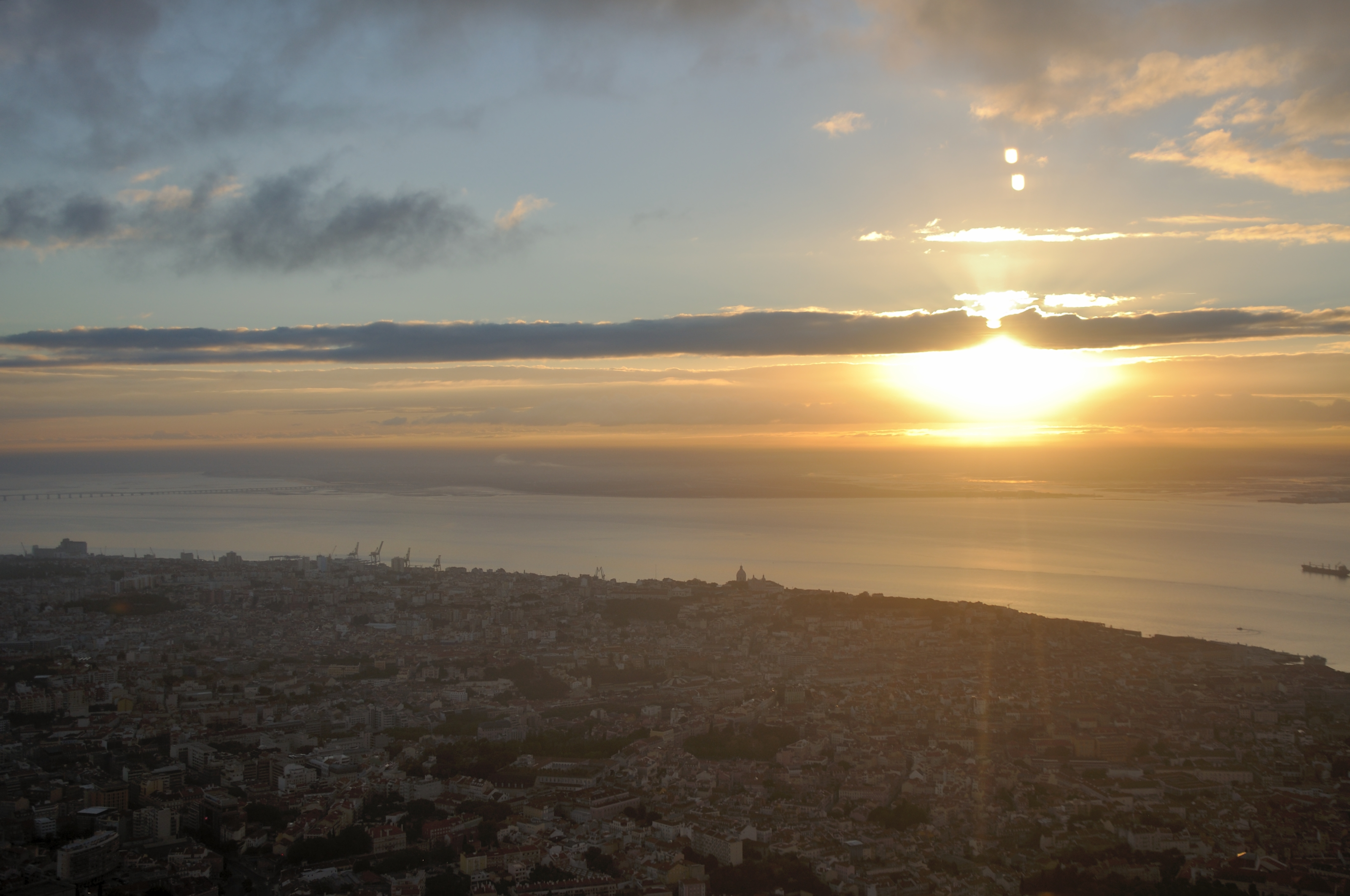
Sunrise in Lisbon seen from an airplane. Note refraction of colors by both the atmosphere and clouds.

Air molecules and airborne particles scatter white sunlight as it passes through the Earth's atmosphere. This is done by a combination of Rayleigh scattering and Mie scattering.

As a ray of white sunlight travels through the atmosphere to an observer, some of the colors are scattered out of the beam by air molecules and airborne particles, changing the final color of the beam the viewer sees. Because the shorter wavelength components, such as blue and green, scatter more strongly, these colors are preferentially removed from the beam.

At sunrise and sunset, when the path through the atmosphere is longer, the blue and green components are removed almost completely, leaving the longer-wavelength orange and red hues seen at those times. The remaining reddened sunlight can then be scattered by cloud droplets and other relatively large particles to light up the horizon red and orange. The removal of the shorter wavelengths of light is due to Rayleigh scattering by air molecules and particles much smaller than the wavelength of visible light (less than 50 nm in diameter). The scattering by cloud droplets and other particles with diameters comparable to or larger than the sunlight's wavelengths (more than 600 nm) is due to Mie scattering and is not strongly wavelength-dependent. Mie scattering is responsible for the light scattered by clouds, and also for the daytime halo of white light around the Sun (forward scattering of white light).

Sunset colors are typically more brilliant than sunrise colors, because the evening air contains more particles than morning air. Ash from volcanic eruptions, trapped within the troposphere, tends to mute sunset and sunrise colors, while volcanic ejecta that is instead lofted into the stratosphere (as thin clouds of tiny sulfuric acid droplets), can yield beautiful post-sunset colors called afterglows and pre-sunrise glows. A number of eruptions, including those of Mount Pinatubo in 1991 and Krakatoa in 1883, have produced sufficiently high stratospheric sulfuric acid clouds to yield remarkable sunset afterglows (and pre-sunrise glows) around the world. The high altitude clouds serve to reflect strongly reddened sunlight still striking the stratosphere after sunset, down to the surface.

=== Optical illusions and other phenomena ===
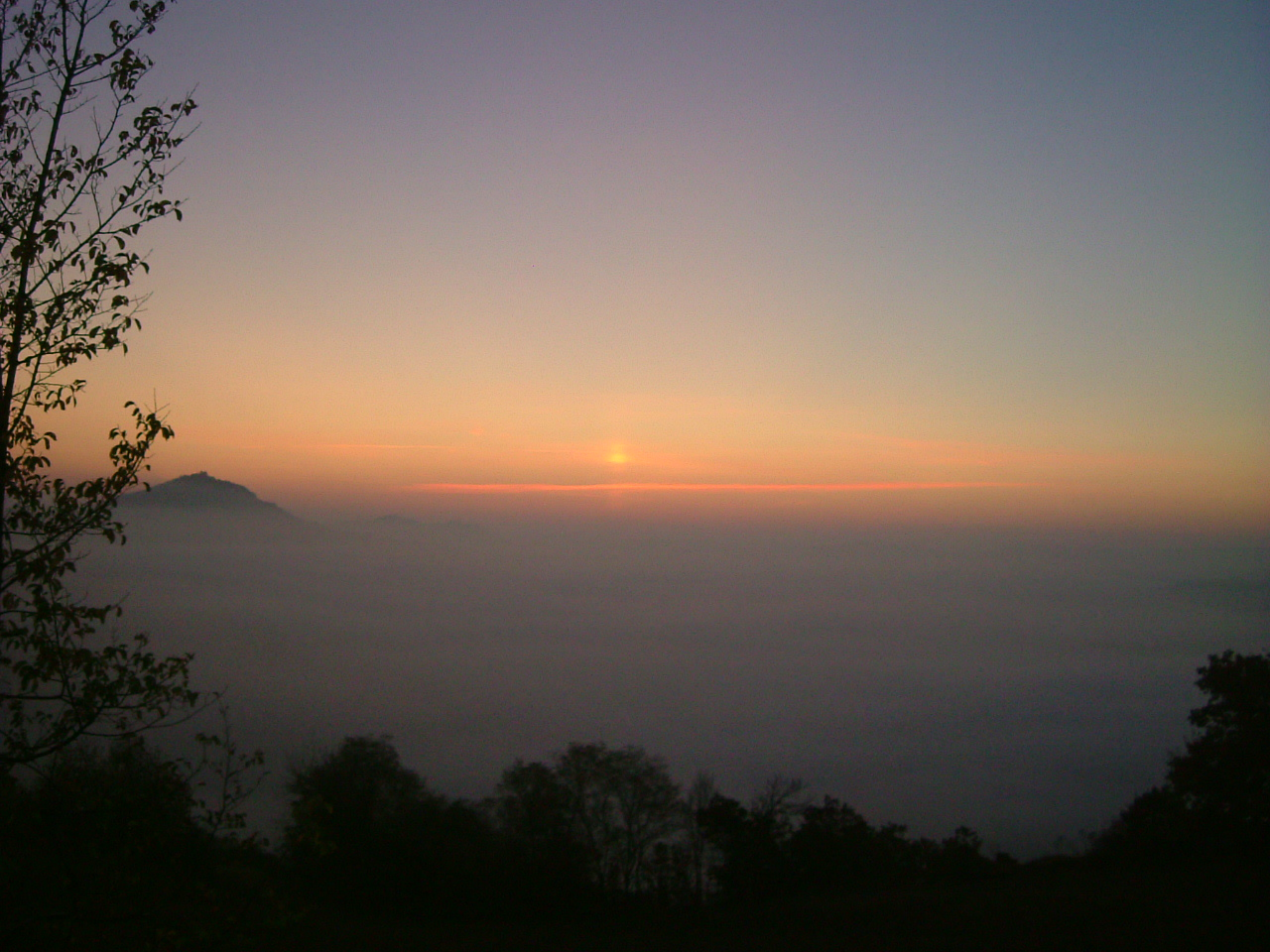
This is a false sunrise, a very particular kind of parhelion.

- Atmospheric refraction causes the Sun to be seen while it is still below the horizon.
- Light from the lower edge of the Sun's disk is refracted more than light from the upper edge. This reduces the apparent height of the Sun when it appears just above the horizon. The width is not affected, so the Sun appears wider than it is high.
- The Sun appears larger at sunrise than it does while higher in the sky, in a manner similar to the Moon illusion.
- The Sun appears to rise above the horizon and circle the Earth, but it is actually the Earth that is rotating, with the Sun remaining fixed. This effect results from the fact that an observer on Earth is in a rotating reference frame.
- Occasionally a false sunrise occurs, demonstrating a very particular kind of parhelion belonging to the optical phenomenon family of halos.
- Sometimes just before sunrise or after sunset, a green flash can be seen. This is an optical phenomenon in which a green spot is visible above the Sun, usually for no more than a second or two.

== See also ==
- Analemma
- Dawn
- Day
- Daytime
- Dusk
- Earth's shadow, visible at sunrise
- First sunrise
- Golden hour (photography)
- Heliacal rising
- Noon
- Red sky at morning
- Sunrise equation
- Sunset
