= Jumma =

Jumma may refer to:

- Friday prayer or Jumu'ah
  - Jumu'ah Mubarak, greeting for the day
  - Congregational mosque, mosques designated for Friday prayer
- Jumma people, the tribes of Chittagong Hill Tracts in Bangladesh

== People ==
- Jumma Miyazaki (born 2000), Japanese footballer
- Jumma Abboud (born 1999), Syrian footballer
- Jumma Khan Marri, nationalist leader from Baluchistan
