= Eid Mubarak =

Muslim annual festival greeting (Eid)

- Eid Mubarak calligraphy
- Arabic: عيد مبارك
- Romanization: ʿīd mubārak
- Literal meaning: "blessed feast/festival"

Eid Mubarak (Arabic: عِيد مُبَارَك, romanized: ʿīd mubārak) is an Arabic phrase that means "blessed feast or festival". The term is used by Muslims all over the world as a greeting to celebrate Eid al-Fitr (which marks the end of Ramadan) and Eid al-Adha (which is in the month of Dhu al-Hijjah). This exchange of greetings is a cultural tradition and not part of any religious obligation.

== Regional variations ==
There are numerous other greetings for Eid al-Adha and Eid al-Fitr throughout the Muslim community. The companions of Muhammad used to say to each other in Arabic when they met on Eid al-Fitr: Taqabbalallâhu minnâ wa minkum (which means "[May] God accept from us and you [our fasts and deeds]"). Throughout the Muslim world, variations in Eid greetings exist.

=== Arab Community ===
Arab Muslims use the term Eid Mubarak and have some other ways to wish a happy holiday. Some Arabs also add "kul 'am wantum bikhair" (كل عام و أنتم بخير), which means "May you be well with every passing year". There is another common term in the states around the Persian Gulf, which is "Minal Aidin wal Faizin" (من العايدين والفايزين), an Arab sentence meaning "May we be sacred [one more time] and may we succeed [in our fasting]", and the reply will be "Minal Maqbulin wal Ghanmin" (من المقبولين والغانمين), which means "May [our good deeds] be accepted [by God] and may we win [the paradise]". (Note: The Arabic is displayed left to right to match the English translation shown. Arabic is normally written right to left.)

=== Iran, Afghanistan, Tajikistan ===
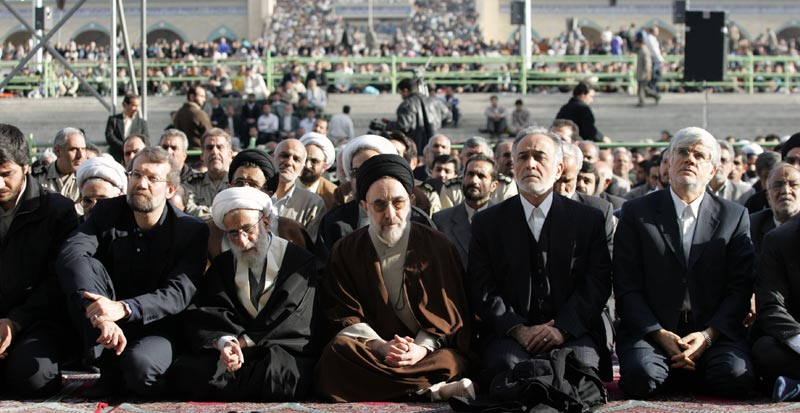
Eid al-Fitr prayers in Tehran on 4 November 2005

Persian speakers (Iranians, Afghans and Tajiks) use the phrase Persian: عید شما مبارک, romanized: eid-e shoma mobarak or Persian: عید مبارک, romanized: eid mobarak for short.

=== Kurds ===
Kurds have different ways of saying "Eid Mubarak", such as: "Jazhin piroz" (Sorani Kurdish: جەژن پیرۆز, romanized: Cejin pîroz, which means 'Happy Eid'), or "Jazhin ba xoshi" (Sorani Kurdish: جەژن بەخۆشی, romanized: Cejin be xoşî, means 'Eid comes happily') in Sorani; "Eid-a wa piroz be" (Kurmanji Kurdish: عیدا وە پیرۆزبە, romanized: 'Eida we pîroz be, which means 'Happy Eid to you') or "Jazhn-a we piroz" (Kurmanji Kurdish: جەژنا وە پیرۆز, romanized: Cejina we pîroz, means 'May your Eid be blessed') in Kurmanji. The phrase "Eid mubarak" is not used in Sorani, only "Eid" is sometimes used in Kurmanji.

=== Bosnia & Herzegovina and Serbia ===
Bosnian Muslims and Serbian Muslims commonly say "Bajram Šerif mubarek olsun"; the response is "Allah razi olsun". Another common Eid greeting by Bosnian Muslims is "Bajram barećula".

=== Turkey and Azerbaijan ===
In Turkey and Azerbaijan, Turks wish each other happy Eid with Turkish phrases including: Bayramınız kutlu olsun ("May your Eid be blessed"), İyi Bayramlar ("Good Eid days"), and Bayramınız mübarek olsun ("May our Eid be blessed"). The phrase "Eid Mubarak" is not used.

=== South Asia ===
In India, Pakistan and Bangladesh, people say Eid Mubarak wishes by shaking hands and hugging them three times, followed by a handshake one more time after the Salat al Eid.

==== Pakistan ====
Urdu speakers, traditionally, only start saying the greeting after the Eid prayer. However, newer generations typically resort to saying the greeting at midnight of the Eid day, traditionally replied with "Khair Mubarak" (Urdu: خیر مبارک). "Āp ko bhi Eid Mubarak" (Urdu: آپ کو بھی عید مبارک, lit. 'Eid Mubarak to you as well') is a rising alternative response among the newer urban generations.

Pashto speakers (mainly Pashtun people from Khyber Pakhtunkhwa province and eastern Afghanistan) also use the Eid greeting "May your festival be blessed" (Pashto: اختر دې مبارک شه, romanized: akhtar de mubarak sha).

Balochi speakers (mainly Baloch people from Balochistan province and Iran's Sistan and Baluchestan Province) also use the Eid greeting "May your Eid be blessed" (Balochi: عید تر مبارک با, romanized: aied tara mubarak ba).

Brahui speakers may also use the Eid greeting "Have a blessed Eid" (Brahui: عید نے مبارک مارے, romanized: aied ne mubarak mare).

Punjabi speakers (mainly Punjabis from the Punjab province in Pakistan and the Punjab state in India) also use the Eid greeting "Eid's Congratulations" (Punjabi: عید دیاں ودھائیاں, romanized: īd diyā̃ vadhāiyā̃).

==== Bangladesh ====
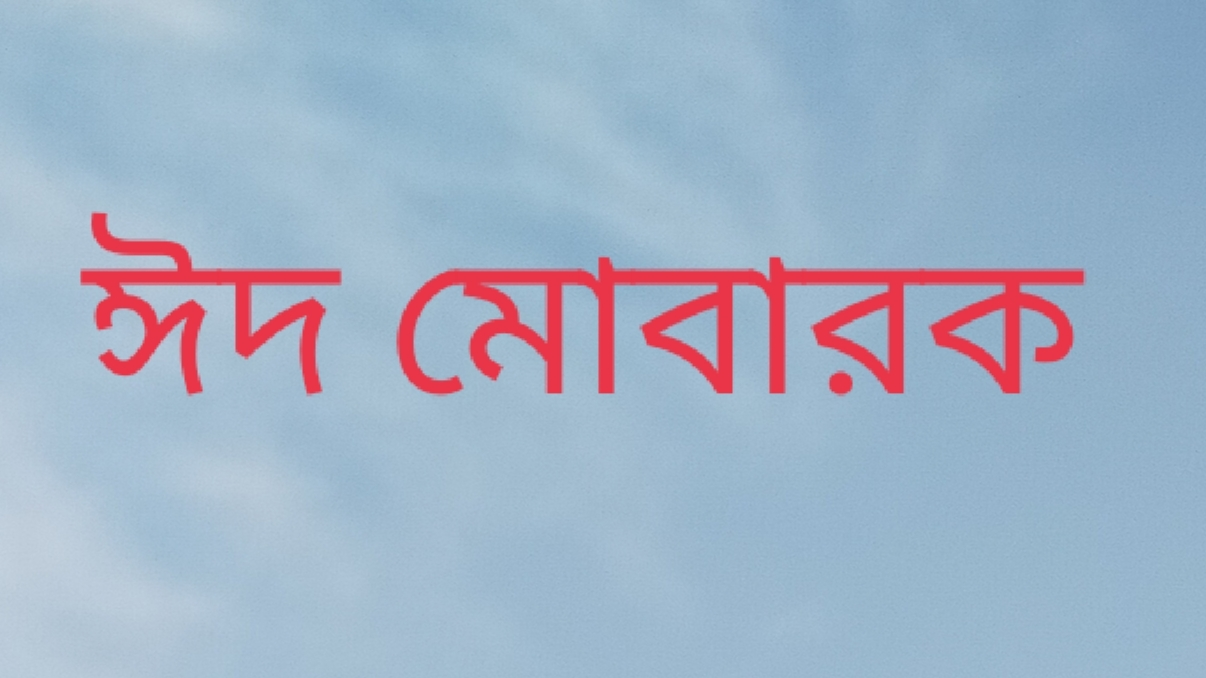
Eid Mubarak in Bengali letters

Many Bangladeshi Muslims may also use the phrase "Eid Mubarak" or "Eid greeting, "Eid's Greetings" (Bengali: ঈদের শুভেচ্ছা, romanized: Eider Shubhechchha).

=== Southeast Asia ===
Muslims in countries such as Indonesia and the Malay language-speaking populations of Malaysia, Brunei, and Singapore use the expression "Selamat Hari Raya" or "Selamat Idul Fitri" (Indonesian) or "Salam Aidilfitri" (Malay). This expression is usually accompanied by the popular expression "Minal Aidin wal Faizin," an Arab sentence meaning "May we be sacred one more time and succeed in our fasting". It is a quotation from a poem written by Shafiyuddin Al-Huli during the time Muslims ruled in Al-Andalus.

==== Philippines ====
In the Philippines, it is recognized as a legal holiday, though the Arabic greeting of Eid Mubarak has gained traction only recently. The traditional greeting of Muslims in the Philippines resembles that of the neighboring Malay-speaking world. This is namely "Salamat Hariraya Puwasa" (Selamat Hari Raya Puasa) for Eid al-Fitr, and "Salamat Hariraya Hadji" (Selamat Hari Raya Hajji) for Eid al-Adha.

=== West Africa ===
The Hausa language, originally from Northern Nigeria and Niger, is widely spoken among Muslims throughout Western Africa. Their equivalent Eid greetings in Hausa is "Barka da Sallah," which translates to "blessed Eid prayers."

In Mali, one greeting used in Bambara on Eid al-Adha is "Sanbɛɛ-sanbɛɛ." This greeting is similarly used by countries that have majority Manding-speaking peoples, another lingua franca spoken by Muslims in Western Africa region, or were once part of the historic Mali Empire.

==== Ghana ====
"Ni ti yuun' palli" is the Eid greeting among Dagbanli and Kusaase speakers in Ghana. It means "Happy new Eid season". The Hausa greeting Barka da Sallah is also commonly used during the period.

=== Latin America and Spain ===
Muslims in countries in Latin America use the expression Feliz Eid (Spanish).

=== Albania and Kosovo ===
Muslims in Albania and Kosovo use the greetings "Urime festa e fitër Bajramit/Urime kurban bajrami".

== See also ==
- Jumu'ah Mubarak
- Eid stamp
- Eid Al-Fitr
- Eid Al-Adha
- Ramadan Mubarak
- Dhul Hijjah
