= Khutbah =

Type of Islamic sermon

A khutbah (Arabic: خُطْبَة, khuṭba; Persian: خطبه, khotbeh; Turkish: hutbe) serves as the primary formal occasion for public preaching in the Islamic tradition. Someone who gives the khutbah is referred to as a khatib.

Such sermons occur regularly, as prescribed by the teachings of all legal schools. The Islamic tradition can be formally observed at the congregation prayer on Friday. In addition, similar sermons are called for on the two festival days (Eid al-Fitr and Eid al-Adha) and after Solar and Lunar Eclipse prayer, as well as after the Rain prayer.

== Origins and definition ==
Religious narration—including sermons—may be pronounced in a variety of settings and at various times. The khutbah, however, refers to khutbah al-jum'a, usually meaning the address delivered in the mosque at weekly (usually Friday) and annual rituals. Other religious oratory and occasions of preaching are described as dars (a lesson) or waz (an admonition), and their formats differ accordingly.

The khutbah originates from the practice of the Islamic prophet Muhammad, who used to deliver words of exhortation, instruction, or command at gatherings for worship in the mosque, which consisted of the courtyard of his house in Medina.

After the conquest of Mecca, Muhammad presented himself as a khatib to the city in AD 630. The first four caliphs, and the Umayyad caliphs and provincial governors all delivered sermons. There were not necessarily exhortatory, but addressed practical questions of government and sometimes even included direct orders. Under the Abbasids, the caliph himself no longer preached but assigned the task to the religious judges. The Abbasids insisted they were clearing Islam of the secularism of the Umayyads, and this probably helped in strengthening the religious aspect of the sermon.

== Delivery ==
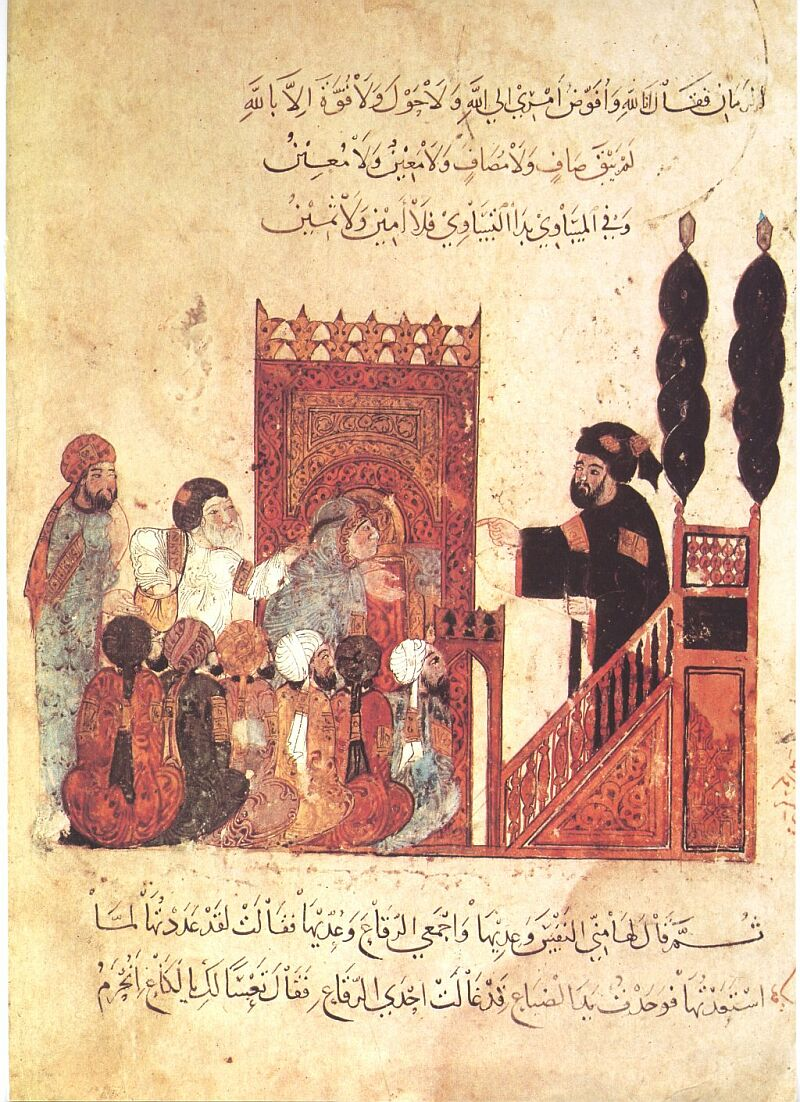
Abbasid Qadi delivers Khutbah in Mosque on the Minbar. (Khutbah was practiced by Caliphate, later it was also adopted by other Muslim rulers)

At the beginning of the service the adhan is given, during which the khatib (the individual who delivers the khutbah) remains sitting. The iqama is given when the khatib descends. The sermon is delivered in two parts. Both parts are delivered while khatib is standing and punctuated by a pause in between them when the khatib sits down.

During the sermon itself, it is obligatory to pronounce the following:

- the tahmid, or an expression to praise God and show gratitude towards him; saying al-hamdu li'llāh ("Praise belongs to Allāh") at the beginning of the sermon is usually sufficient,
- the salawat, or invocations of peace and blessings on Muhammad,
- recitation of a part of the Quran in the first part of the sermon or, according to some doctrines, in both,
- admonitions to piety in both parts of the sermon,
- and dua (prayer) on behalf of the faithful.

The khatib must be in a state of ritual purity; his dress must be in accord with the prescriptions. It is commendable for the khatib to be on a pulpit or an elevated place; to salute the congregation when directing himself towards them; to sit down until the adhan is pronounced by the muezzin; and to direct himself straightway to his audience. Finally, the khatib should make the sermon short.

Make your salah (prayer) long and your khutbah (sermon) short.

— Muhammad

Historically, sermons were delivered in classical Arabic. This linguistic requirement required substantial training on the part of the khatib and this contributed to the growth of a literary genre consisting of model sermons, such as those by the renowned Ibn Nubata (d. 984). The Sahabah, even after migrating to foreign lands, always kept the khutbah in classical Arabic but would instead conduct a longer lecture before the khutbah in the local language. According to the four accepted Sunni schools of jurisprudence, it is a requirement for the khutbah to be delivered completely in classical Arabic.

In the modern era however, preaching in vernacular languages, while often retaining certain Arabic expressions, has become common in contemporary and non-traditional circles.

== Friday ==
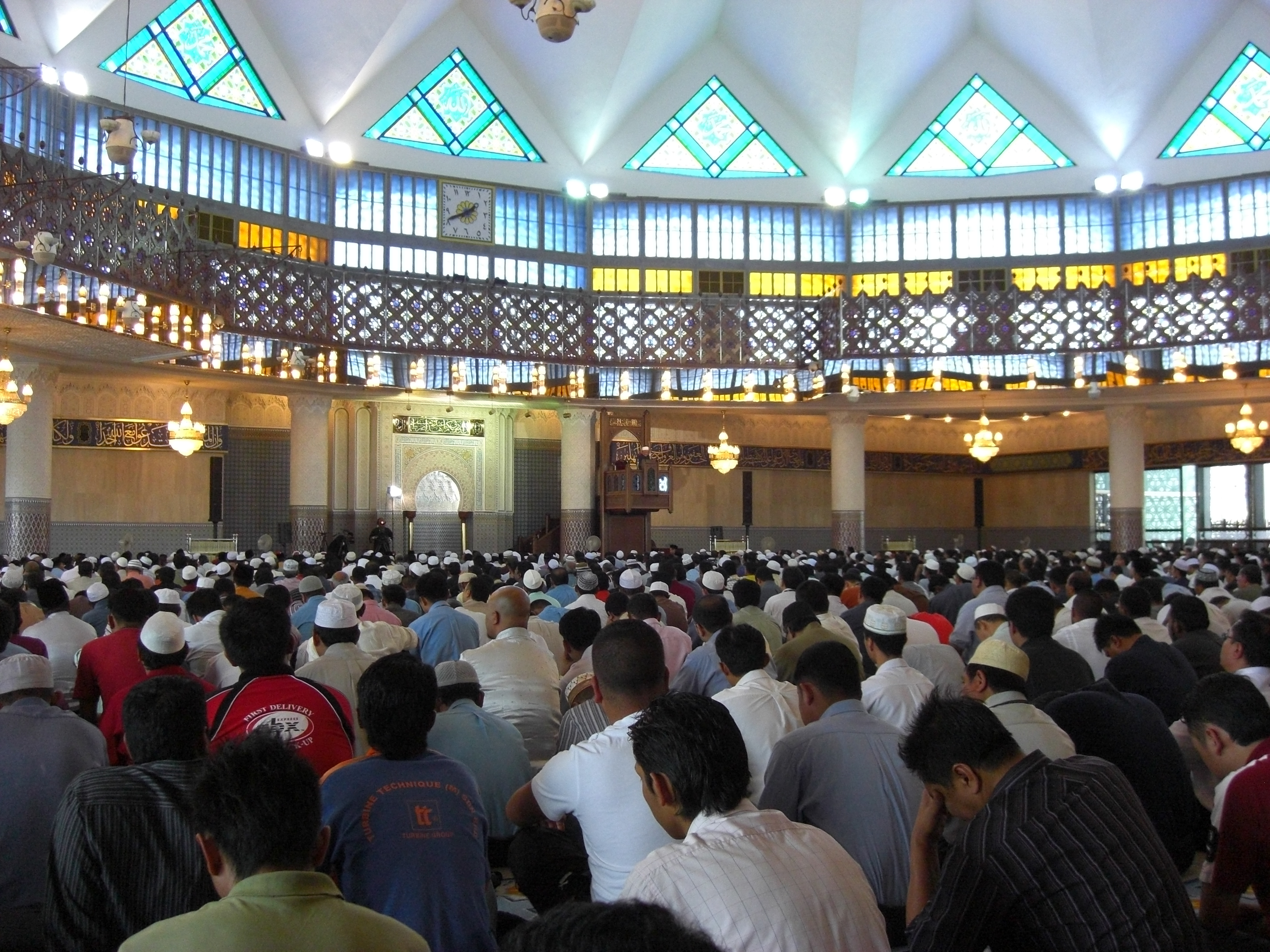
Worshipers listening to a sermon at the National Mosque of Malaysia

One of the conditions for the validity of the Friday service is that it must be preceded by two sermons. The sermons are delivered when the number of auditors required for a valid j̲umu‘a are present, which is a minimum of 40 attendees according to the Hanbali school and Shafi'i school and only three people, excluding the imam are needed according to the Hanafi school. Finally, the Maliki school requires 12 people of local residence, excluding the imam.

Traditionally, as instructed in classical Islamic legal treatises, Friday congregational prayers in which sermons were delivered were restricted to urban centers and normally to one major mosque in each city. Such a mosque is referred to as a masjid jami‘, that is, a "Friday Mosque" (or a "cathedral mosque"). These mosques were distinguished by their central location, large dimensions, monumental architecture, symbolic furnishings indicative of its exalted stature, and, the most demonstrative of all, the minbar (ritual pulpit).

In contemporary times, Friday congregational prayers with sermons are common in mosques of all sizes and conditions, and not just restricted to a few central locations. Sermons are also dispensed through newspapers and broadcast on radio and television.

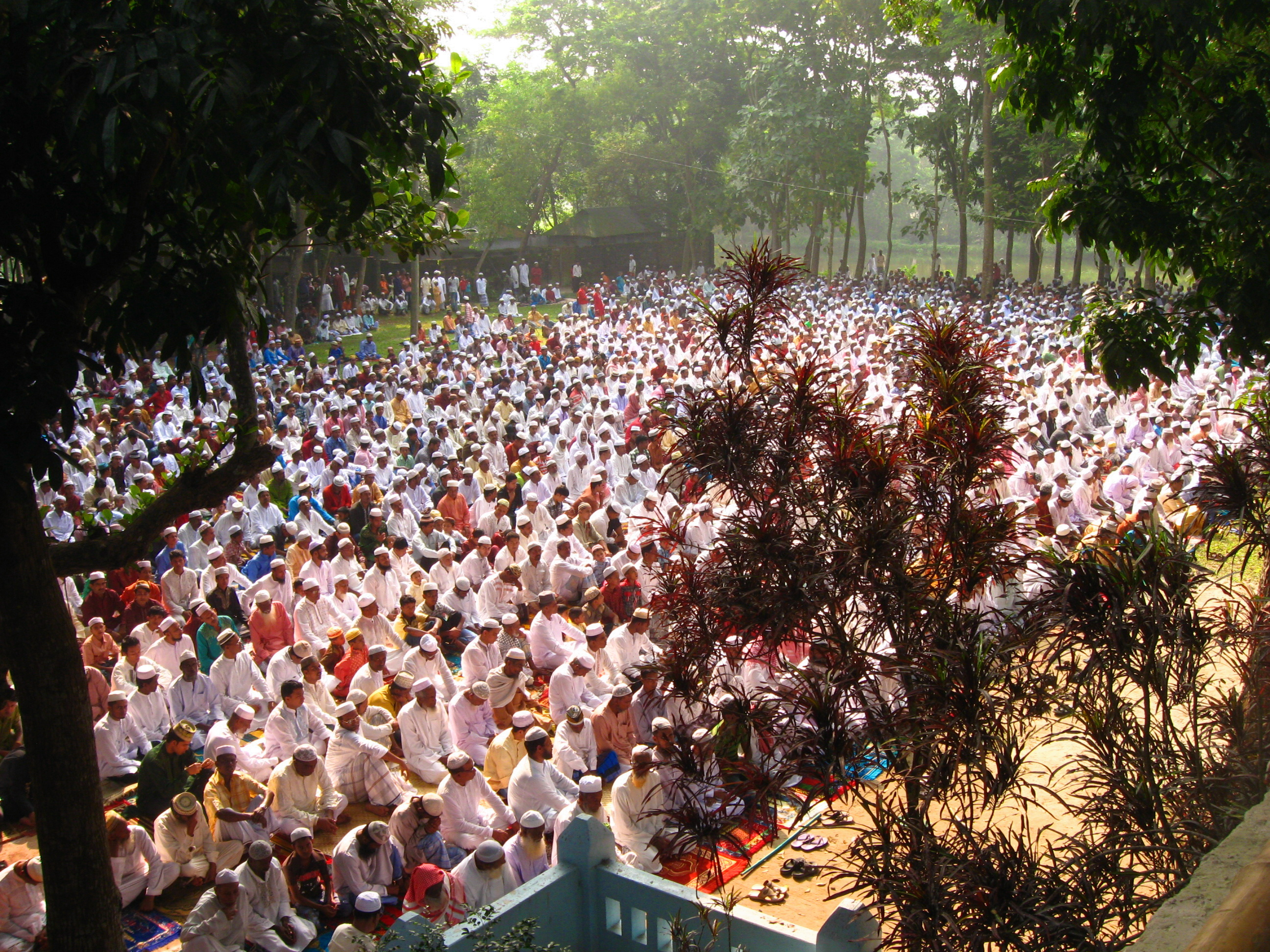
Muslim males can be seen attending khutbah as part of the Eid-al-Adha prayers. Photo taken at Barashalghar union of Comilla's Debidwar Upazila.

=== Special occasions ===
Sermons on special occasions generally contain features that are relevant to the celebrations (e.g. Eid) or the natural phenomena for which they are delivered (e.g. Kusuf and Khusuf). For instance, on Eid al-Fitr, the preacher has a duty to instruct the faithful congregation concerning the zakat, or almsgiving. On Eid al-Adha the preacher includes remarks specifying the rules for the sacrifice.

There is a slight difference in the sermon delivered on Eid ul-Fitr. The sermon's first part must open with nine takbirs, the second part with seven. The sermon may also be pronounced while sitting. Regarding the sermons delivered during an eclipse or excessive drought, classical texts advise that such sermons must admonish the audience and ask God's forgiveness. Usually the verse 9 of Surah At-Tahrim (Quran 66:09) is also recited and a special prayer called "Muḥammad's dua"ʾ is said.

== Sovereign's name ==
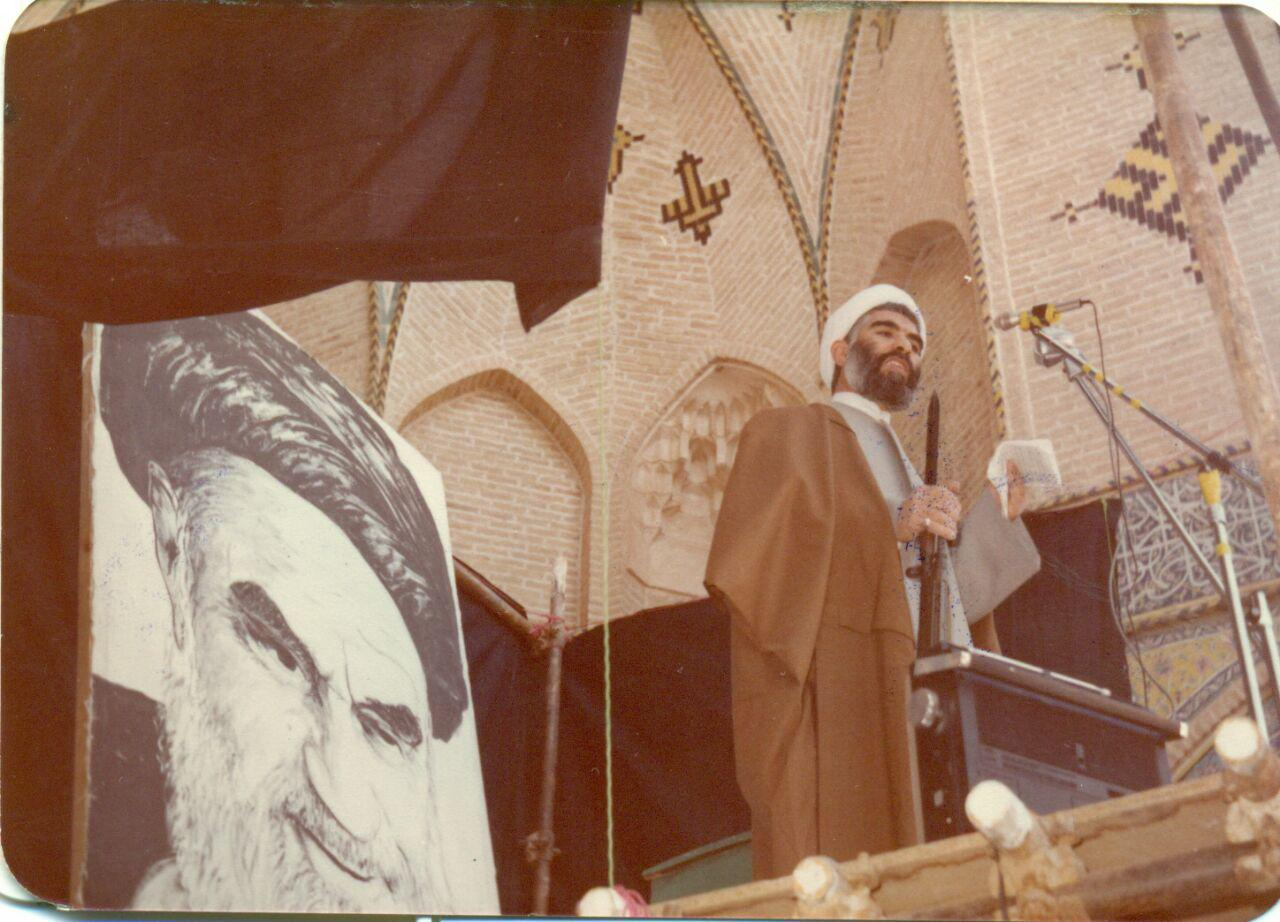
Shia khatib Abbas Ali Akhtari giving a sermon in his first Friday prayer in Semnan, 1981.

In the pre-modern Middle East, the mention of a ruler's name in the sermon was one of the two prerogatives of sovereignty (the other being the right to mint coins). Mentioning meant accepting the sovereignty and suzerainty of a ruler, and it was considered the principal criterion of sovereignty for an Islamic ruler. Omitting the name of a ruler from the sermon was like publicly declaring independence. This prerogative of sovereignty was introduced by Islam. It was not present in the pre-Islamic era. In addition, the sermon, a major vehicle of communication, also announced the deposition of a ruler, the accession of a ruler, nomination of an heir, and the beginning and end of a war.

The sovereign's name was also declared in khutbahs during the Mughal rule; Babur was styled 'Zahir-ud-Din Bábar Muhammad' during Friday khutbahs. Sher Khan, an adversary of the Mughal emperor Humayun, was content if Bengal was given to him in return of the emperor retaining his right to mint coins and proclaim the khutba in the emperor's name, and thereby becoming the "emperor's vassal".

Some Muslim monarchies practice this in their state-regulated sermons, including Brunei and Malaysia.

== Khutbah and the Ministries of Islamic Affairs in modern states ==
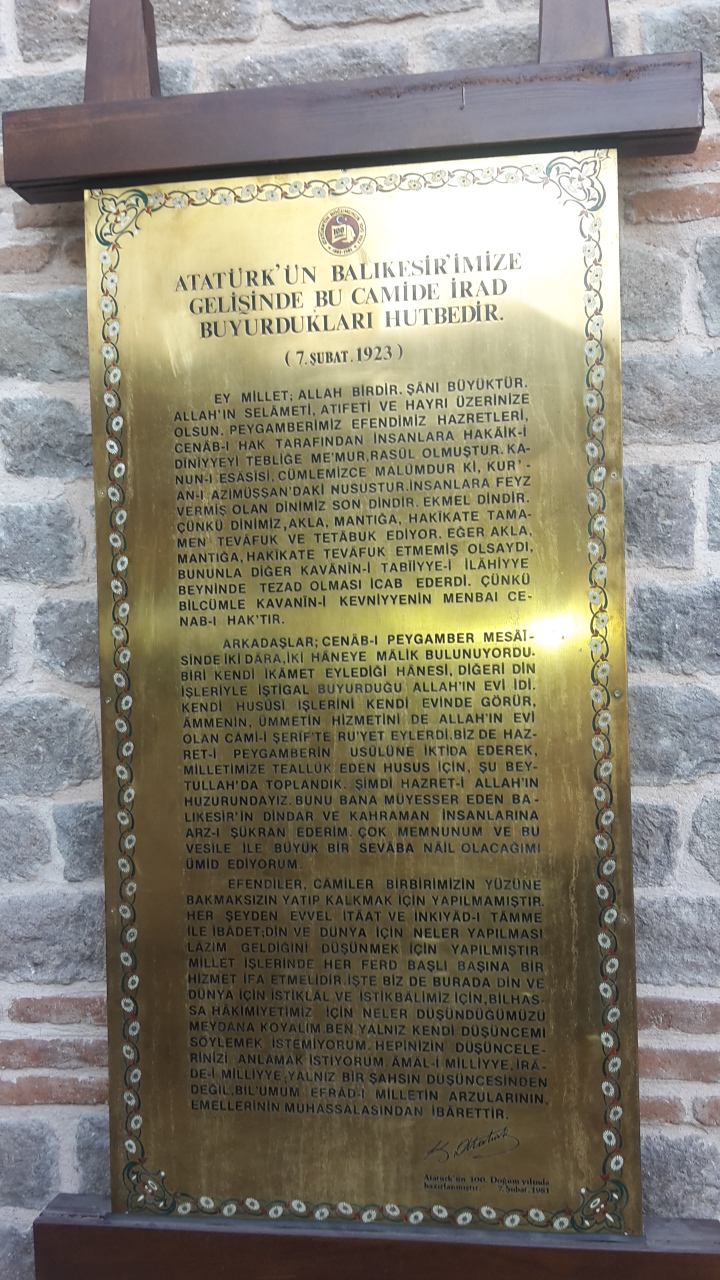
Khutbah of Mustafa Kemal Atatürk in the Zagan Pasha Mosque of Balikesir

In a number of countries like Turkey, Saudi Arabia, and Egypt, there is a central religious authority supervised by the government which issues a weekly sermon to be read in all mosques under its jurisdiction. In Turkey the sermons are prepared by the Presidency of Religious Affairs (Diyanet), in Saudi Arabia by the Ministry for Islamic Affairs, Dawah and Guidance. In Egypt a similar unified sermon was instituted in 2016.

== Related concept ==
Ibn al-Jawzi writes in his Ru'ūs al-Qawārīr of a similar concept also called khutbah. Also referred to by the same name as the sermon, this concept was different. Its primary purpose was not to admonish, instruct or reprove, but rather to exalt and praise God. It invited others to worship and celebrate God's greatness.

Al-Jawzi employed a variety of metaphors and alluded to nature frequently.

== See also ==
- Glossary of Islam
- Outline of Islam
- Index of Islam-related articles
- Nahj al-balagha
- Qira'at
- The Sermon for Necessities
