= Sermon for Necessities =

Islamic speech used on special occasions

The Sermon for Necessities (Arabic: خطبة الحاجة; transliterated as Khutbat-ul-Haajah) is a popular sermon (khutbah) in the Islamic world (particularly as the introduction to a khutbah during Jumu'ah). It is used as an introduction to numerous undertakings of a Muslim.

== History of the Sermon ==
The Sermon for Necessities was initially taught by Muhammad as part of the Sunnah. From Muhammad, the sermon has been reported by numerous Sahaba including: Abd Allah ibn Mas'ud, Abu Musa Ashaari, `Abd Allah ibn `Abbas, Jabir ibn Abd-Allah, Aisha and Sahl ibn Sa'd. The use of the sermon had been neglected for some years until certain scholars such as Ahmad ibn Muhammad al-Tahawi, Ibn Taymiyyah, and Ibn Qayyim Al-Jawziyya and others revived it.

== Text of the Sermon ==
The Sermon for Necessities is composed of the following text (i.e. the English translation of the original Arabic text) as taught by Muhammad, including Ayat (Verses) from three different Qur’anic Suras (Chapters):

[إن] الحمد لله [نحمده] ونستعينه ونستغفره ونعوذ بالله من شرور أنفسنا [ومن سيئات أعمالنا] من يهده الله فلا مضل له ومن يضلل فلا هادي له وأشهد أن لا إله إلا الله وحده لا شريك له] وأشهد أن محمدا عبده ورسوله].

[In]al-hamdu Lillaahi [nahmaduhu wa] nasta’eenahu wa nastaghfiruhu, wa na’oodhu billaahi min shuroori anfusinaa [wa min sayi’aati a’maalinaa]. Man yahdih Illaahu falaa mudilla lahu wa man yudlil falaa haadiya lahu. Wa ashhadu an laa ilaaha ill-Allaah [wahdahu la sharika lahu] wa ashhadu anna Muhammadan ‘abduhu wa rasooluhu."
Which means: “Verily, all praise is for Allah, we praise Him and we seek His assistance and we ask for His forgiveness. And we seek refuge in Allah from the evils of our selves and from the evils of our actions."

“Whoever Allah guides, there is no one that can lead him astray, and whoever is led astray, there is no guide for him. I bear witness that there is no deity that has the right to be worshipped except Allah- alone and with no partner- and I bear witness that Muhammad is His slave and messenger."

Yaa ayyuha’lladheena aamanu-ttaqu’Llaaha haqqa tuqaatihi wa laa tamootunna illaa wa antum muslimoon 3:102

“O you who believe, fear Allah as He ought to be feared and do not die except as Muslims.” [Surah Al Imran: 102]

Yaa ayyuha’n-naas uttaqu rabbakum alladhi khalaqakum min nafsin waahidatin wa khalaqa minhaa zawjahaa wa baththa minhumaa rijaalan katheeran wa nisaa’an wa’ttaqu-Llaah alladhi tasaa’aloona bihi wa’l-arhaama inna Allaaha kaana ‘alaykum raqeeban 4:1

“O mankind, fear Allah who created you from a single soul (Adam), and created from that, its mate (Eve). And from both of them, He brought forth many men and women. And fear Allah to whom you demand your mutual rights. Verily, Allah is an All-Watcher over you.” [Surah An-Nisa: 1]

Yaa ayyahu’lladheena aamanu-ttaqu’Llaaha wa qooloo qawlan sadeedan Yuslih lakuma AAmalakum wa yaghfir lakum dhunoobakum waman yutiAAi Allaha wa rasoolahu faqad faaza fawzaan AAatheeman 33:70-71

“O you who believe, fear Allah and speak a word that is precise (i.e. truthful). He will rectify your deeds for you and forgive you your sins. And whoever obeys Allah and His Messenger has indeed achieved a great success.” [Surah Al-Ahzab: 70-71]

AAmma bAAdu: ...

“To proceed”: …

After saying “To proceed,” the person then continues upon what they planned to say, write or do.

== See also ==
- Dua
