= Qunut =

Islamic prayer

"Qunut" is a supplication type of prayer made while standing in Islam.

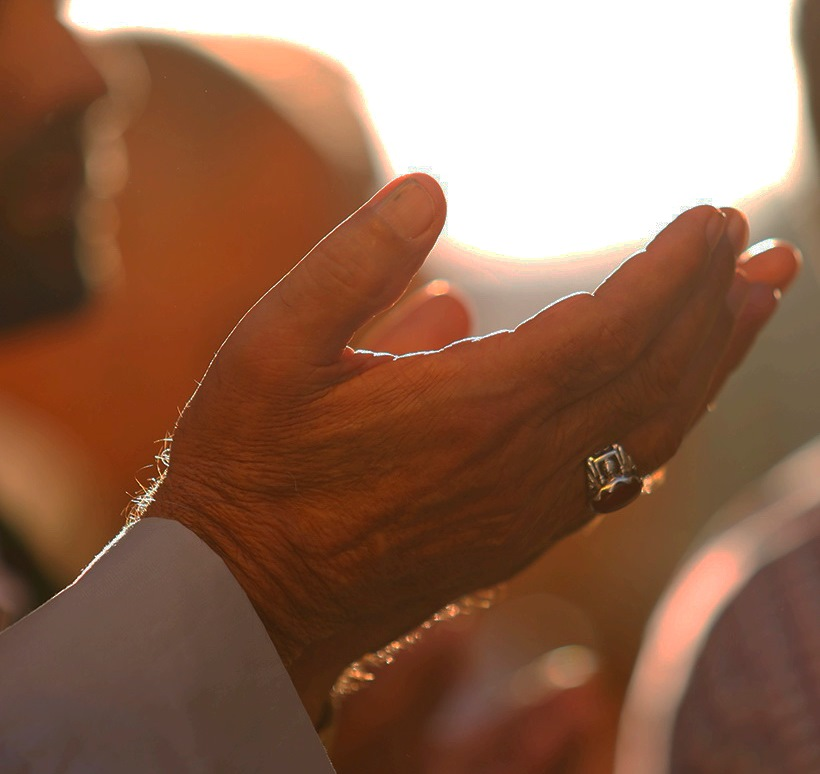
The position of the hands while reciting qunūt.

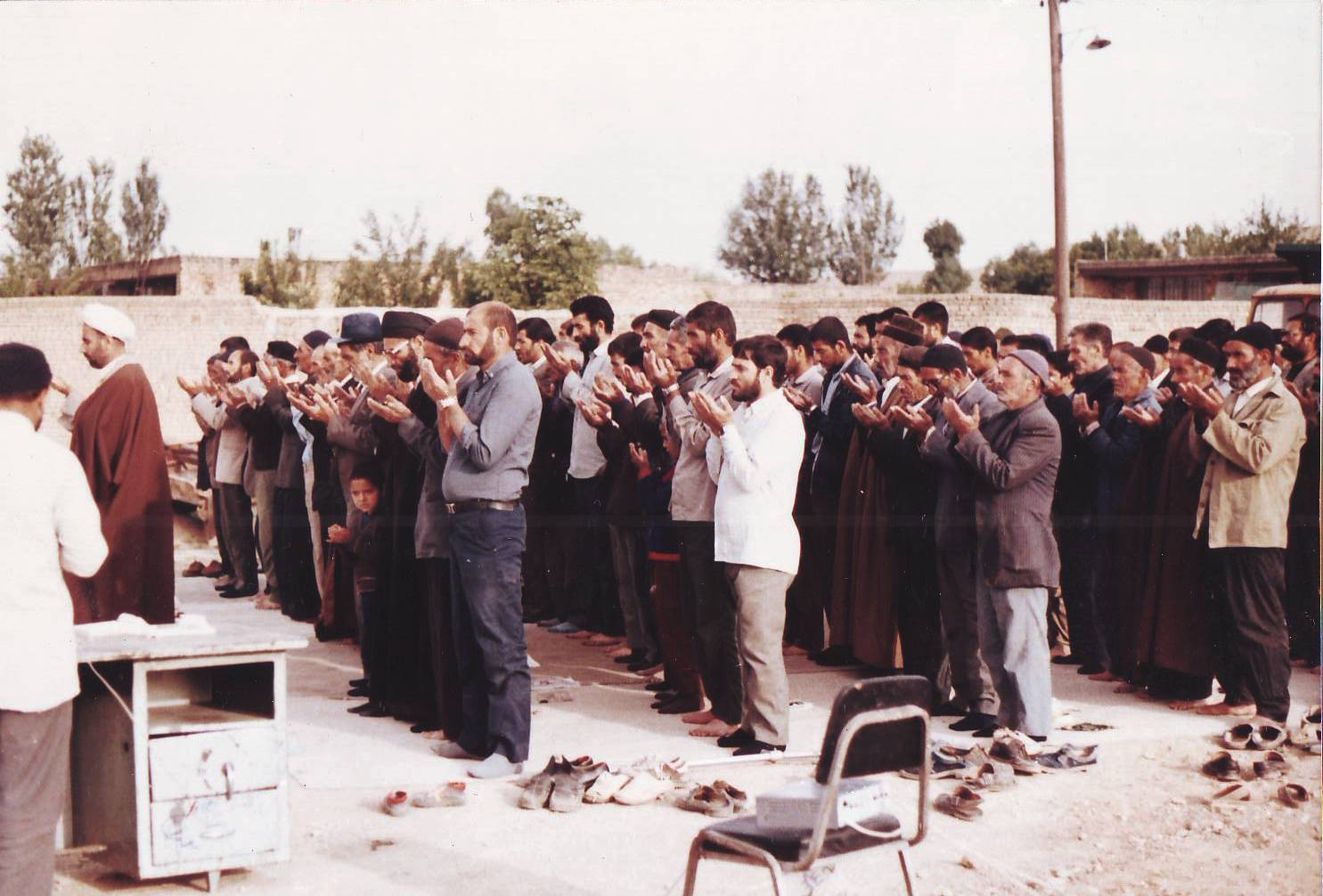
Qunut prayer of Eid al-Fitr 1362 Azna, Al-Mahdi City, Iran.

== Etymology ==
"Qunūt" (Arabic: القنوت) Qunut comes from the root "qunu", which literally means to obtain something and a cluster of dates, and in Quranic terms, it means obedience and worship along with humility and humility. The word duʿā' (Arabic: دعاء) is Arabic for supplication, so the longer phrase duʿā' qunūt is sometimes used.

Qunut has many linguistic meanings, such as humility, obedience and devotion. However, it is more understood to be a special du'a which is recited during the prayer.

== Customs ==
=== Shia ===
Reciting qunūt in prayer—raising the hands before the face and reciting supplications—as is commonly practiced among Shia (raising both hands in the second rak‘ah before going into rukūʿ), is not customary in any of the four Sunni schools of thought.

In all obligatory and recommended prayers, performing qunūt in the second rak‘ah before rukūʿ is considered recommended (mustahabb).

=== Sunni ===
It is permissible to make the qunut before going into ruku (bowing), or it may be recited when one stands up straight after the ruku. Humaid says: "I asked Anas: 'Is the qunut before or after the ruku?' he said: 'We would do it before or after." This hadith was related by Ibn Majah and Muhammad ibn Nasr. In Fath al-Bari, Ibn Hajar al-Asqalani comments that its chain is faultless. During dua qunut, the hands should be put together like a beggar.

The minority Ibadi school of Islam rejects the practice of qunūt altogether.
