= Jumu'ah Mubarak =

Traditional Muslim greeting

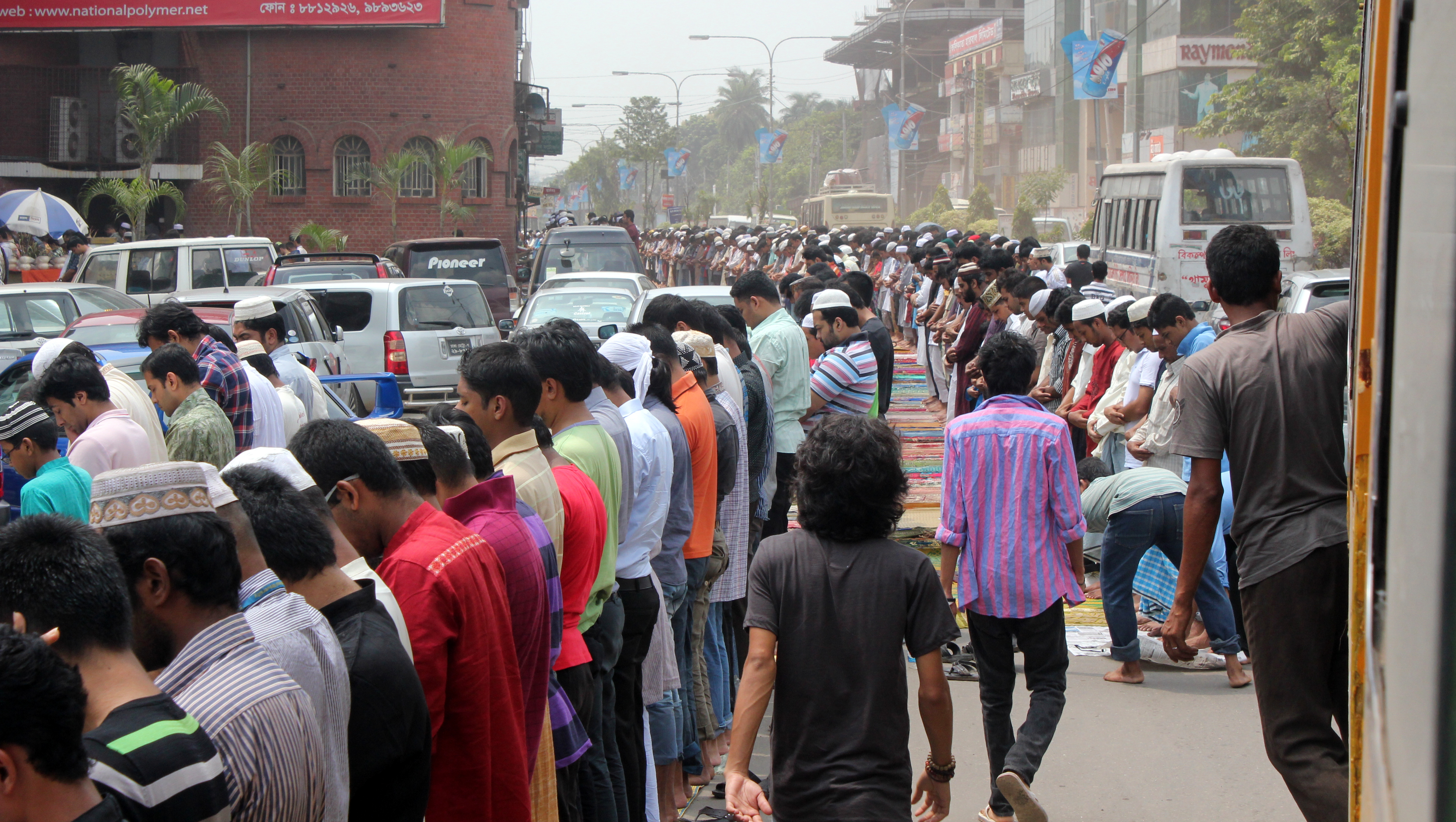
Muslims celebrating Jumuah in Dhaka

Jumu'ah Mubārakah (Arabic: جمعة مباركة), the holiest day of the week on which special congregational prayers are offered. The phrase translates into English as "happy Friday", and can be paraphrased as "have a blessed Friday". Internationally, Muslims use it as a greeting for use on the feast. Fridays are considered a celebration in their own right and Muslims take special care in wearing clean clothes, bathing, and preparing special meals on this day. The term Jumu’ah is derived from the same root as jama'a, which means "the gathering of people". In the social sense, people take part in Friday prayers in the afternoon during the time the Zuhr prayer would normally be offered.

== Meaning ==
=== Literal meaning ===
Jumu'ah is one of the most important Islamic rituals and is considered one of its obligatory acts. Jumma Mubarak literally means Happy Friday, where Jumma means "Friday" and Mubārak translates as "blessed". Muslims offer weekly prayers at noon on Friday, as a core part of Islamic beliefs.

=== Islamic terminate meaning ===
According to Hadith, Friday is the best day during which the sun has risen. It is the day Adam was created, the day when Adam entered paradise, and also when he was banished from it. It is also the day on which the Yawm ad-Din or Day of Resurrection will take place. As this day has its own importance in Islam, Muslims wish each other "Jumu'ah Mubārak" or "Blessed Friday" when they go to the mosque and recite a special prayer. The reply to this greeting is usually the same, “Jummah Mubārak”.

== See also ==
- Salah
- Mu'in al-Din Chishti
