= Dua =

Islamic prayer of invocation, supplication or request

Duʿāʾ (Arabic: دعاء [dʊˈʕæːʔ], plural: ʾadʿiyah أدعية [ʔædˈʕɪjæ], "invocation"/"supplication") literally translates to 'invocation' and is a fundamental act of prayer and worship in Islam. Unlike other formal religious prayers, du'ā' is informal and is considered, by Muslims, a direct channel of communication with the divine. There are multiple types of du'ā' and specific etiquette to be followed when performing du'ā'.

== Role in Islam ==
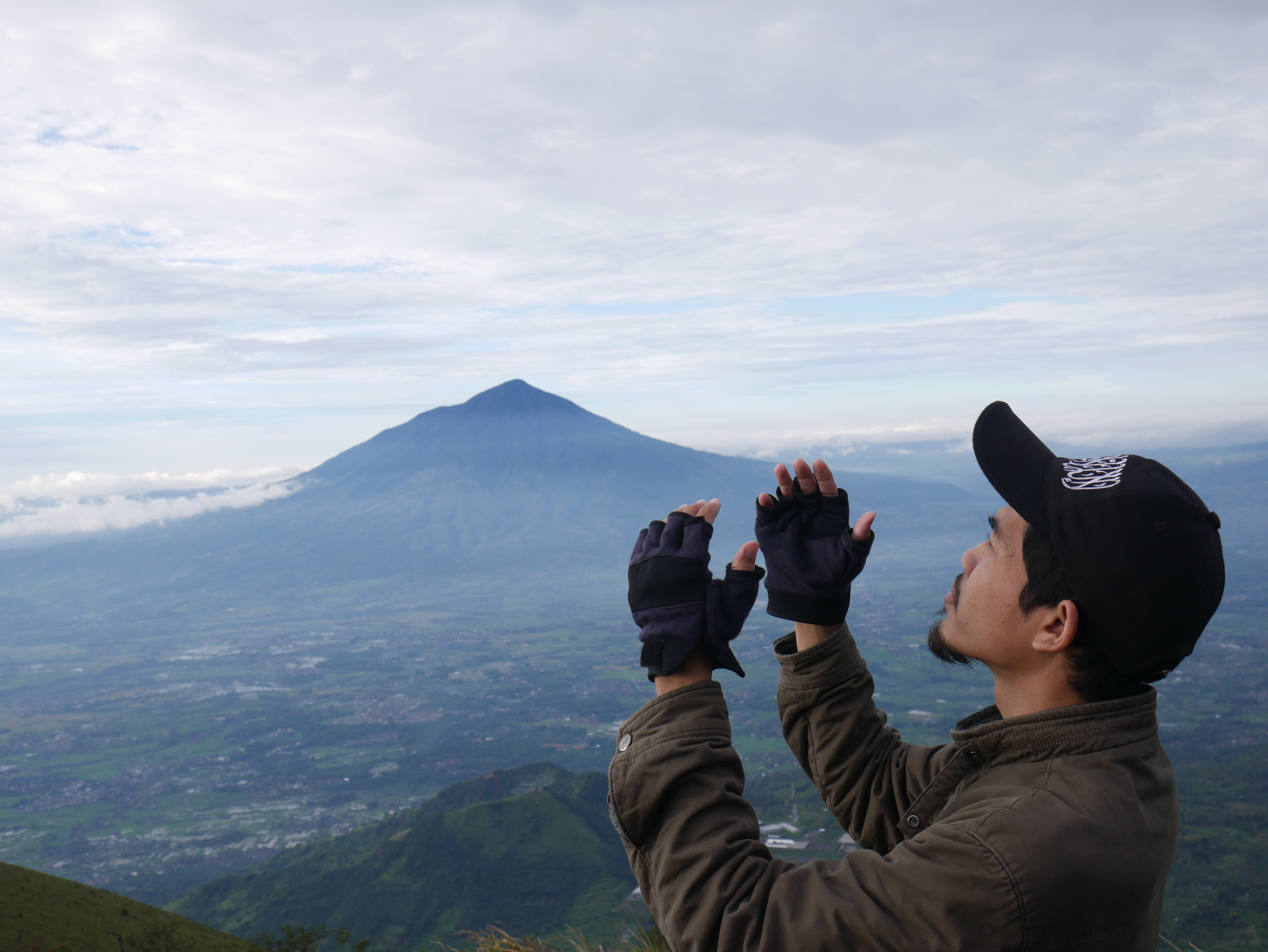
An Indonesian Muslim man doing dua

In Islamic thought, du'ā' is considered both an act of worship and the most spontaneous and ordinary appeal to God. It fulfils three theological purposes: praise, petition, and intercession. Praise is primarily directed at God, his divine qualities and deeds, but can also celebrate the divinely inspired qualities of human beings like the Islamic prophet Muhammad and members of the early community. Petition is to ask for God's aid and intervention. Annemarie Schimmel observes that prayer is an intimate conversation between man and God that consoles the sorrowful heart, even in the absence of an immediate response. Intercessory prayer reflects a more communal dimension of prayer, grounded in the belief that prayers on behalf of another person are meaningful and beneficial. It is common for Muslims to follow any mention of Muhammad with "May God bless him and give him peace." In this way, Muslims are expected to offer prayers even for Muhammad.

Classical Muslim exegetes and Sufi thinkers debated how Qur'anic verses promising divine response to supplication could be reconciled with prayers remaining unanswered. Commentaries by Al-Tabari, Fakhr al-Din al Rāzī, and al-Qurtubi on the following verses sought to explore this paradox:

"I answer the call [da'wa] of the suppliant [da'i] when he calls upon Me [da'ani]." (Q 2:186)

"Call upon Me [ud'uni] and I will answer you." (Q 40:60)

Atif Khalil notes that Islamic traditions provided different ways to reconcile this paradox. By drawing on the hadith "Du'ā' is worship", some exegetes extended the meaning of du'ā' to include repentance or worship ('ibāda). In this reading, God's 'response' is his acceptance rather than a fulfilment of the prayer. Later authors such as 'Abd al-Qādir al-Jīlānī, al-Qurtubī, and al-Ghazālī argued that effective du'ā' requires good moral conduct, repentance, and the pursuit of a lawful life. Thus, sin and injustice can serve as obstructions to receiving a divine response. Sufi commentators like Rāzī and Rūmi maintained that even the act of calling upon God is itself the greatest reward, demonstrating faithful dependence upon God. As du'ā' facilitates intimacy (qurba) with God, prayer serves as its own response. Most authors noted that sincere petitions may be answered in varied ways: the request may be granted, deferred to the afterlife, rewarded with something better, or used to avert any misfortune.

There is a special emphasis on du'ā' in Muslim spirituality and early Muslims took great care to record the supplications of Muhammad and his family and transmit them to subsequent generations. These traditions precipitated new genres of literature in which prophetic supplications were gathered together in single volumes that were memorized and taught. Collections such as al-Nawawi's Kitab al-Adhkar and Shams al-Din (Allama Muhammad) al-Jazari's al-Hisn al-Hasin exemplify this literary trend and gained significant currency among Muslim devotees keen to learn how Muhammad supplicated to God.

Over time, devotional literature on du'ā' has expanded beyond prophetic supplications. This devotional literature documents formulaic du'ā' of certain pious individuals. Popular du'ā's would include Muhammad al-Jazuli's Dala'il al-Khayrat, which at its peak spread throughout the Muslim world, and Abul Hasan ash-Shadhili's Hizb al-Bahr which also had widespread appeal. Du'ā' literature reaches its most lyrical form in the Munajat, or 'whispered intimate prayers' such as those of Ibn Ata Allah. Among the Shia schools, the Al-Sahifa al-Sajjadiyya (The Scripture of al-Sajjadiyya) records du'as attributed to Ali and his grandson, Ali ibn Husayn Zayn al-Abidin.

Narrated Anas:
Allah's Apostle said," None of you should long for death because of a calamity that had befallen him, and if he cannot but long for death, then he should say, 'O Allah! Let me live as long as life is better for me, and take my life if death is better for me.' "

— Muhammad al-Bukhari, Sahih al-Bukhari

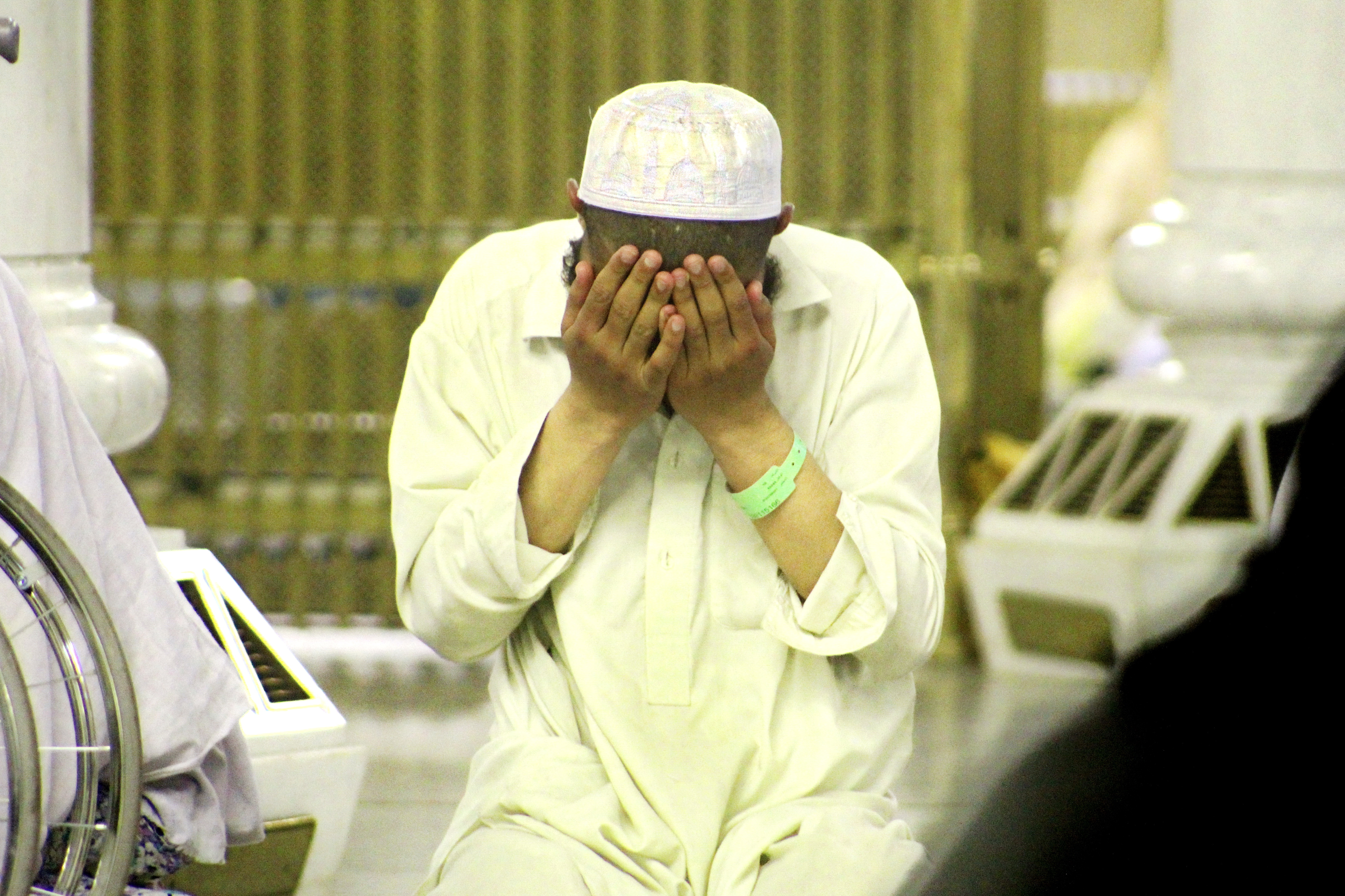
A young Muslim supplicating after salah at the Great Mosque of Mecca, Saudi Arabia

== Theological distinction from salat ==
Islamic jurisprudence states there is a distinction between du'ā' and salat. Salat is an obligatory liturgical ritual performed 5 times daily, whereas du'ā' is a personal invocation. Salat is performed with strict rules and in classical Arabic and du'ā' is more flexible with spontaneity and in any language without geographic requirements. Salat belongs to ibadat, the strict regulations of bodily worship, while du'ā'' is an open-ended, internal discussion with the divine. du'ā'' can be performed while walking, resting, or doing other activities, independent of the strict posture, geographical, and other rules placed on the 5 salat prayers.

== Types and categories ==
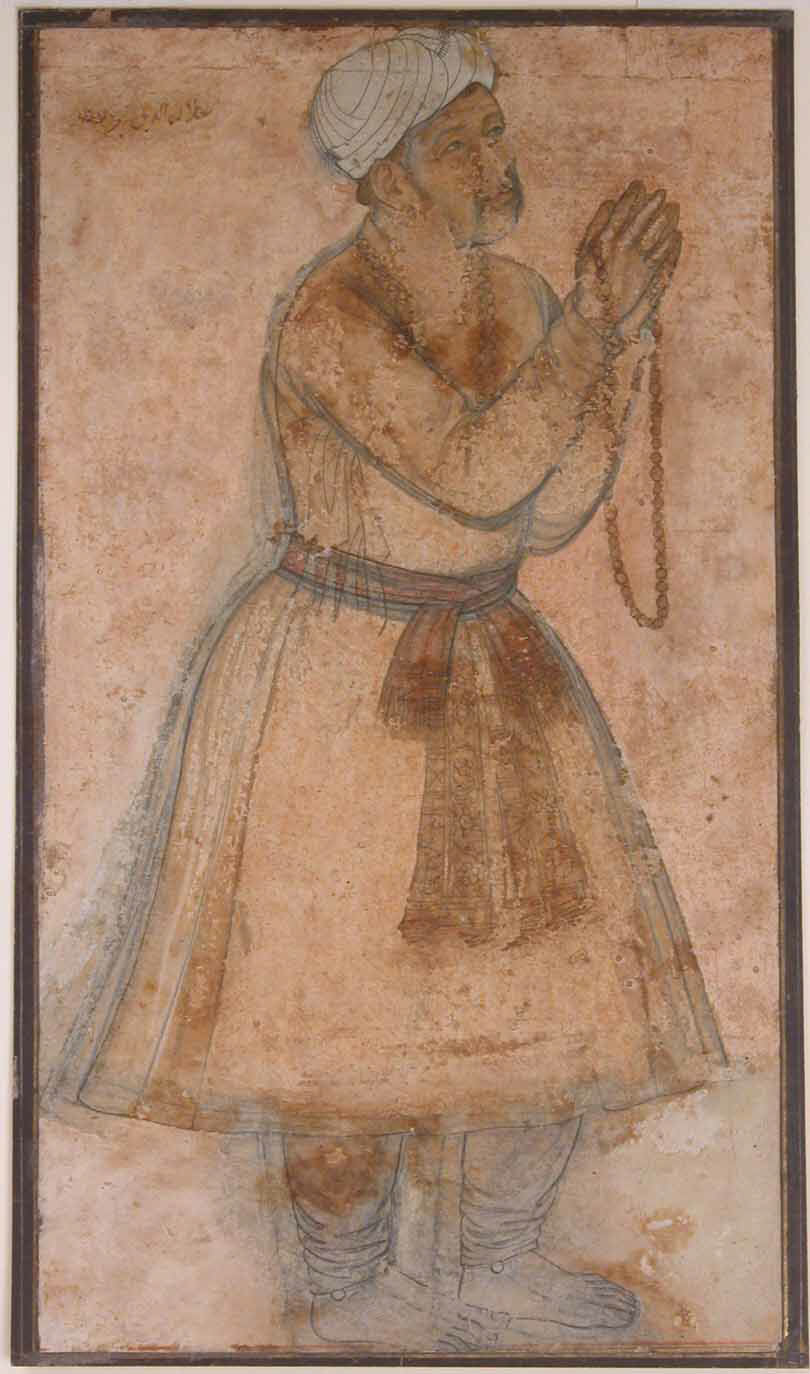
Portrait of the Mughal Emperor Akbar invocation of a Du'ā' prayer

Du'ā' is essentially an expression of submission of faith to God and of one's neediness. Du'ā' denotes a petitionary prayer that seeks divine favour or aid. Unlike salat, it is considered by Muslim thinkers to be a verbal phenomenon although at times physical postures may be used. The content of du'ā' is usually centred on human need and distress, although it can, and ideally should, also include expressions of gratitude and praise.

Type I: Du'ā' al-mas'alah (دُعَاءُ الْمَسْأَلَة du'ā'u 'l-mas'alah), or the du'ā' of asking.' This type of du'a is when one asks for the fulfillment of a need, or that some harm be removed from him/her. An example would be when a person asks, "O God! Grant me good in this world, and good in the next life!"

Type II: Du'ā al-'ibadah (دُعَاءُ الْعِبَادَة du'ā'u 'l-'ibādah), or the 'du'ā'of worship.' This type of du'ā' includes every single act of worship. Examples would include when a Muslim prays or gives zakāt or fasts.

=== Common du'ā' ===
1. A person who recites from إِنَّ فِي خَلْقِ السَّمَاوَاتِ وَالْأَرْضِ ("In the creation of the heavens and the earth") in Surah Al Imran till the end of the surah on any night or part of the night will receive the reward of performing salat for the whole night.
2. A person who recites Surah Ya Sin early in the morning will have his needs for the day fulfilled.
3. Abdullah bin Masood narrates that Muhammad stated that the person who recites the last two ayat of Surah Al-Baqara till the end, then these two ayats will be sufficient for him, that is, God will protect him from all evil and ploys.
4. When retiring to sleep, make wudu, dust off the bed three times, lie on the right side, place the right hand under the head or cheek, and recite the following du'ā' three times: اللَّهُمَّ بِاسْمِكَ أمُوتُ وَأَحْيَا ("In your name, O Allah, I die and I live")
5. A person who recites three times أَعُوذُ بِاللَّهِ السَّمِيعِ الْعَلِيمِ مِنَ الشَّيْطَانِ الرَّجِيمِ ("I seek refuge in Allah, the All-Hearing and All Knowing from the accursed devil") in the morning, followed by the last three ayat of Surah Al-Hashr, then God delegates 70,000 angels (malāʾikah) to send mercy onto him till the evening. If he dies that day, he will die as a martyr. If he recites these in the evening, then God delegates 70,000 angels to send mercy upon him until the morning, and if he dies that night, he dies as a martyr.
6. A Muslim servant who recites رَضِيتُ بِاللَّهِ رَبَّاً وَبِالْإِسْلَامِ دِينَاً وَبِمُحَمَّدٍ نَبِيَّاً ("I am pleased with Allah as my Lord, and with Islam as my religion, and with Muhammad as my Prophet") three times every morning, it becomes the responsibility of God to satisfy him on the Day of Qiyamah.
7. A person who recites اللَّهُمَّ مَا أَصْبَحَ بِي مِنْ نِعْمَةٍ أَوْ بِأَحَدٍ مِنْ خَلْقِكَ فَمِنْكَ وَحْدَكَ لَا شَرِيكَ لَكَ فَلَكَ الْحَمْدُ وَلَكَ الشُّكْرُ ("O God, whatever favour has come to me or to any of Thy creatures in the morning, it comes from Thee alone who hast no partner, to whom be praise and thanksgiving") in the morning has pleased (praised, glorified) God for His favours of the morning; and if he recites it at night, he has thanked God for His favours of the night.
8. If a person recites three ayat of Surah Ar-Rum and then misses his usual recitation of the day, he will still be rewarded for it. This applies to the night as well.
9. If a person retires to bed on the side and recites Surah Al-Fatiha and Surah Al-Ikhlas, he is immune from everything except death.
10. Reciting Ayat-ul Kursi will cause the reciter to be protected throughout the night by the angels, and Satan will not come near him.
11. When a person goes to bed, an angel and a Shaitan surround him. The Shaitan whispers: "your awakening will end in evil", while the angel says, "end in good". Whoever sleeps after engaging in dhikr will be protected by angels throughout the night. To gain the protection of the angels, it is encouraged to engage in dhikr before sleeping
12. A man once dreamed of Muhammad several times. Each time, he asked Muhammed for advice on how to retain his faith. Muhammad told him to recite the following each day:

In the name of Allah the Beneficent the Merciful O Allah! O Allah! O Allah! The Security, the Security the Security from the vanishment of the faith. O the Eternally Known! O the Eternally Obliging and O the Guide of those gone astray, Thee alone do we worship and of Thee (only) do we seek help. May Allah's blessings be upon His best creation Mohammed and all his (pure) progeny.

— Book of 101 Dua's (Supplications)

=== Zayn al-'Abidin's du'ā' ===
Ali ibn al-Husayn Zayn al-'Abidin conveyed his understanding of the relationship between human and God by the prayers and supplications that he offered God during his extensive nighttime vigils in the Al-Masjid an-Nabawi (Mosque of the Prophet) in Medina. These prayers and supplications were written down and then disseminated by his sons and the subsequent generations. Among them is the Al-Sahifa al-Sajjadiyya, which is known as the Psalms of the Household of Muhammad.

All Praise is for Allah who treats me with clemency, just as if I have no sin. So my Lord is the most praised by me of all, and most worthy of my praise. O' Allah! I find the roads of wishes to You wide open, And the rivers of hope to You vast and running, And counting on Your bountifulness (in times of need) for those who wished You freely accessible, And the gates of prayer to those who are disparate, wide ajar, And I know that You are for those who ask You in the position of answer, And for those who are distressed, You are in a posture of rescue.

— An extract of the Dua of Abu Hamza al-Thumali by Ali ibn al-Husayn Zayn al-'Abidin

== Conditions and etiquette ==
Classical jurists and Sufi writers have defined the conditions and etiquette (adab) that must accompany du'ā' to maximise its efficacy. The conditions are as follows:

- Only consume legally permitted foods
- Praying with the conviction that one's prayer will be answered
- Remain undistracted during prayer
- What is prayed for should not be used for sinful acts, create enmity between blood relations, or violate the rights of Muslims
- Do not ask for anything impossible as it would suggest a lack of respect for God.

The etiquette consists of:

- Choosing the best periods to pray
- Prostrating or standing upright
- Performing ablutions beforehand
- Confessing faults and repenting
- Facing the qibla
- Raising hands towards the heavens
- Praise the divine at the beginning, middle, and end of the prayer.

In Islam there are nine pre-conditions that need to be present in order for a du'a to be accepted.

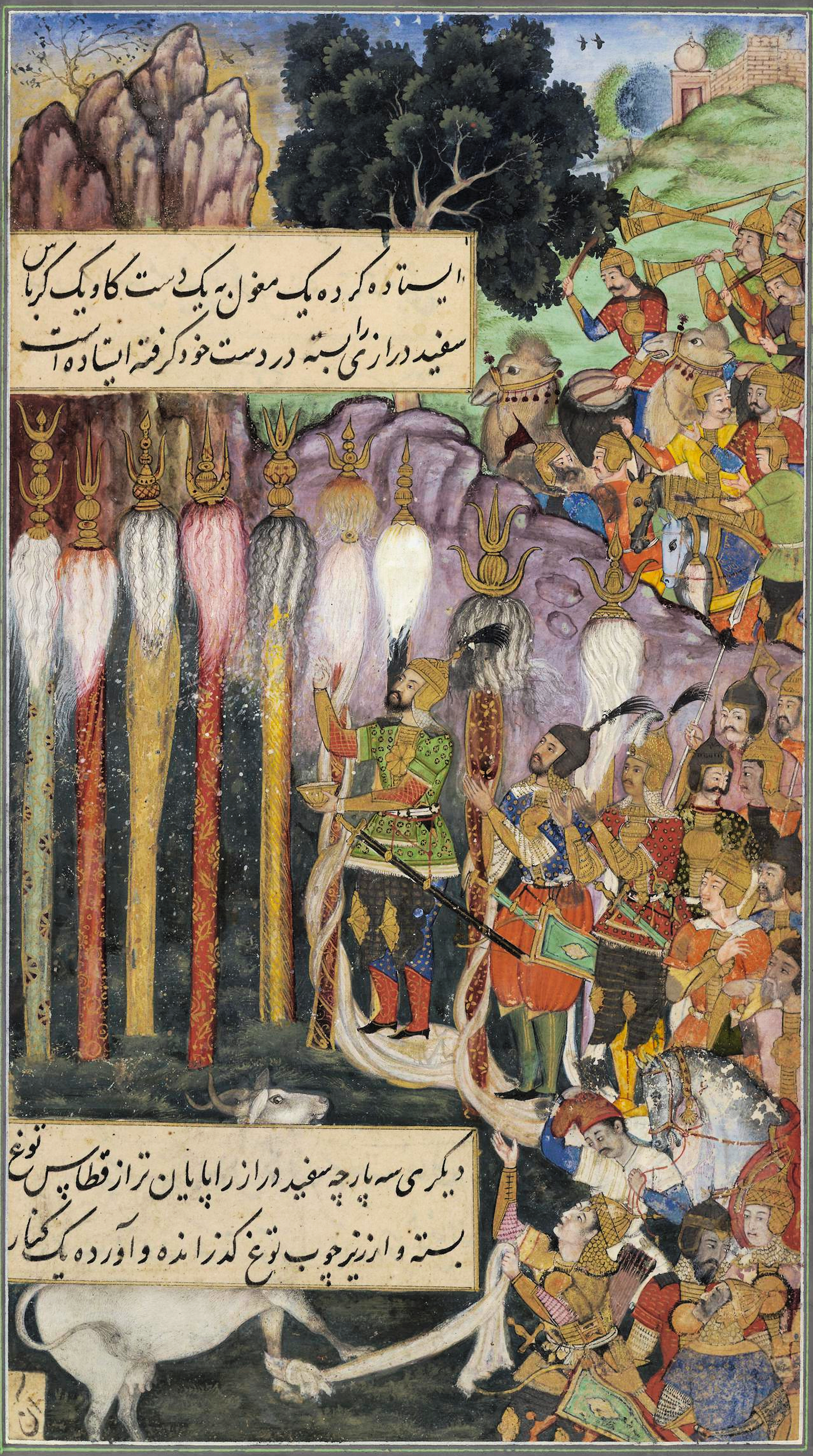
The first Mughal Emperor Babur and his Mughal Army perform a Dua prayer while saluting their standards.

=== Sincerity ===
In Islam, rules have been made to remember God. All Muslims follow those rules. It is necessary to be pure in order to remember God in Islam. Every Muslim is required to offer prayers for 5 times, God is remembered through prayers. In Islam a Muslim prays to God alone.

=== Patience ===
In Islam, to be hasty in du'ā' is said to be a cause of rejection of du'ā'. The type of hastiness that is forbidden in Islam is that a person leaves du'ā', thinking that God will not respond to it. In Islam, Muslims are instructed not to give up du'ā' because they do not see a response immediately.

=== Purity ===
In Islam, in order for a person's du'ā' to be accepted by God, it must be for something pure.

=== Good intentions ===
In Islam it is imperative that a person making du'ā' has the best of intentions for whatever he or she is asking. An example would be if someone asks for an increase in wealth, they should intend to spend more of that wealth on the poor and on their relatives than on themselves.

=== Attentive heart ===
Muslims are instructed to make du'ā' with an attentive heart. They should be aware of what they are saying and believe in their heart that God will respond.

=== Sustenance ===
It states in the Quran in sura Al-Baqara Verse 200:

When you have fulfilled your sacred rites, praise Allah as you used to praise your forefathers ˹before Islam˺, or even more passionately. There are some who say, “Our Lord! Grant us ˹Your bounties˺ in this world,” but they will have no share in the Hereafter.

— Surah Al-Baqara 2:200

Again and moreover Muhammad is reported to have said,

"O People! God is al-Tayyib (pure), and He only accepts that which is pure! God has commanded the Messengers, for He said, 'O Messengers! Eat from the pure foods, and do right.' Furthermore he said, 'O you who believe! Eat from the pure and good foods we have given you.' Then Prophet Hazrat Muhammad mentioned a traveller on a long journey, who is dishevelled and dusty, and he stretches forth his hands to the sky, saying, 'O my Lord! O my Lord!', While his food is unlawful, his drink is unlawful, his clothing is unlawful, and he is nourished unlawfully; how can he be answered?"

== Shi'a Isma'ili tradition ==
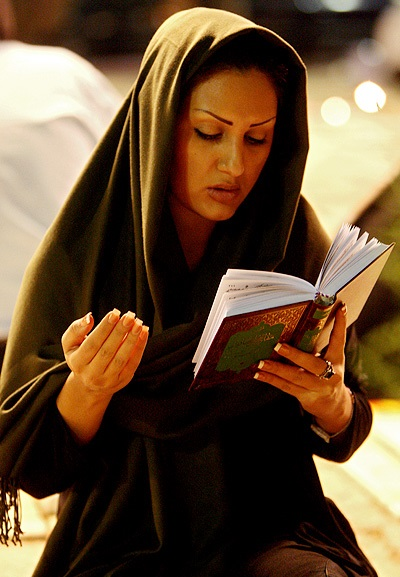
An Iranian Shi'a Muslim praying and making du'ā' on Laylat al-Qadr, 2008

Some Shia believe there are preliminaries for fulfillment of du'ā'. According to Mutahhari, Du'ā' is both premises and conclusion, both means and end.

Shi'a Isma'ili Muslims perform du'ā' three times a day as part of worship services in the jamatkhanas (assembly places). Those unable to pray in congregation at the jamatkhana are expected to recite the obligatory du'ā' at dusk and dawn. The du'ā' is key to the worship service, without which it remains incomplete. The Isma'ili du'ā' is recited in Arabic and consists of six cycles. Each part begins with basmala and concludes with sujud (prostration). The first half of each cycle conveys fundamental principles and the second half is a supplication followed by tasliyah or salah.

The core of the Shi'a Isma'ili du'ā' is recognising the authority and leadership of 'Ali and the Nizari lineage of imams. In this tradition, imams are understood as divinely inheriting the capacity to uncover the secrets of the Qur'an and thus revered as trustees of Muhammad's message and divine revelation. Every du'ā' ends with a testimony acknowledging the present imam. After reciting the du'ā', each member of the congregation turns to either side to shake hands while saying shah jo didar, that is, "May you glimpse His divine countenance".

== Other optional etiquette ==
There are various other optional techniques and etiquettes in the Quran and Sunnah for du'ā'. Listed here are a limited few and just a fraction of the etiquettes of du'ā' that scholars have found in reference to in the Quran and Sunnah.

=== Raising one's hands ===
Raising one's hands is an encouraged option. There are many hadith that describe how Muhammad raised his hands during du'ā'. Some hadith describe him having raised his hands to or above head-level in dire circumstances. Many scholars agree that aside from times of exceptionally great need, Muhammad did not raise his hands above his head. Under any other conditions, a common practice is to raise the hands to shoulder-height with palms placed together.

Scholars however agree that there are two authentic ways of raising one's hands: when not in drastic conditions the palms of one's hands should be turned up facing the skies, whilst the back of one's hands are facing the ground, then the du'ā' can be "recited". One must also make sure to face the Qibla (direction of prayer), whilst making du'ā'.

The second way agreed upon by scholars is to have the palms facing one's face; once again one must face the Qibla, but this time the back of one's hands should also face the Qibla.

Evidence for facing the Qibla during du'ā' can be found in Sahih al-Bukhari and Sahih Muslim

Abdullah ibn Zayd narrated:

'The Prophet left (Madinah) to this prayer, seeking rain. So he made a du'a, and asked for rain, then he faced the Qibla and turned his cloak inside-out'

— Sahih al-Bukhari #6343, Muslim No. 894 and others

=== Facing the Qiblah ===
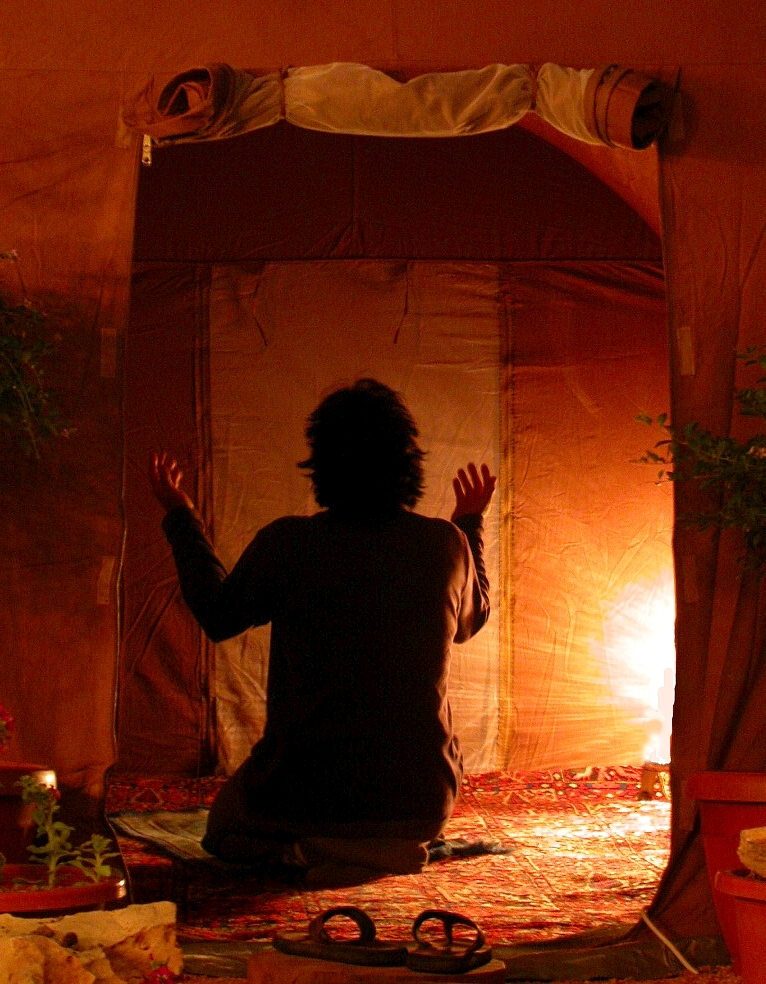
Raising hands in du'ā'

The Qibla is the direction that Muslims face while performing salat.

There are also Sahih hadith which narrate that it is forbidden to lift one's eyes towards the sky in prayer.

Abu Huraira reported:

People should avoid lifting their eyes towards the sky while supplicating in prayer, otherwise their eyes can be snatched away.

=== Wiping the face ===
Once the du'ā'has been completed, it is most common for the supplicant to wipe their face with their hands, and this act signals the end of the du'ā'.

Narrated Abdullah ibn Abbas:
The Prophet said:...
Supplicate Allah with the palms of your hands; do not supplicate Him with their backs upwards. When you finish supplication, wipe your faces with them.

— Abu Dawood, Sunan Abu Dawood

Narrated Yazid ibn Sa'id al-Kindi:
When the Prophet made supplication (to Allah) he would raise his hands and wipe his face with his hands.

— Abu Dawood, Sunan Abu Dawood

== See also ==
- Raising hands in du'ā'
- Du'ā' Kumayl
- Duha
- Mafatih al-Janan
- The Sermon for Necessities - a popular sermon in the Islamic world, particularly as the introduction to a khutbah during Jumu'ah
- Durood
- Du'ā' in Yazidism
