= Chafa'a =

Islamic prayer offered at night

Shafa'a prayer
- Official name: صَلَاةُ الشَّفْعِ
- Also called: Even or parity prayer
- Observed by: Muslims
- Type: Islamic
- Significance: A Muslim prayer offered to God after Isha prayer.
- Observances: Sunnah prayers, Salah times
- Begins: Isha prayer
- Ends: Witr prayer
- Frequency: Daily
- Related to: Salah, Nafl prayer, Five Pillars of Islam, Witr, Islamic prayers

Shafa'a (Arabic: شَفْعٌ) is an Islamic prayer (salat) that is performed at night after Isha (night-time prayer) or before Witr (odd or imparity prayer).

== Presentation ==
The term Chafa'a is cited in the Quran into the Āyah 3 of Surah Al-Fajr:

سورة الفجر، الآية 3: "وَالشَّفْعِ وَالْوَتْرِ".

English: by the Even and the Odd.
(Quran: 89:3)

== Recitation ==
It is desirable (mustahabb) in the Chafa'a prayer to recite the qiraat and tilawa of Surat Al-Fatiha and the surah that follows it in a loud voice like a loud prayer, just as it is desirable to recite Surat Al-Ala in the first rak'ah, then recite Surat Al-Kafirun in the second rak'ah.

The jurists have relied on the loudness and the silence in the Chafa'a prayer, as well as the Witr prayer, which is part of the law of God, which requires that the recitation be in the entire night prayer, including Chafa'a and Witr, sometimes loudly and sometimes in silence.

This jurisprudential opinion was based on the prophetic hadith narrated by the Mother of the Believers Aisha bint Abi Bakr in the Sunan Abu Dawood and Musnad Ahmad ibn Hanbal, which reads:

Arabic hadith	English translation
Arabic: « كُلُّ ذَلِكَ كَانَ يَفْعَلُ -رَسُولُ اللَهِ-، رُبَّمَا أَسَرَّ بِالْقِراءَةِ، وَرُبَّمَا جَهَرَ. » — Hadith	English: « All of this was done by Allah's Messenger, perhaps he recited covertly, and perhaps overtly. » — Hadith

Imam Ibn Abi Zayd al-Qayrawani said in his book Al-Risalah:

Arabic citation	English translation
Arabic: « يُصَلِّي الشَّفْعَ وَالْوَتْرَ جَهْرًا، وَكَذَلِكَ يُسْتَحَبُّ فِي نَوَافِلِ اللَّيْلِ الْإِجْهَارُ، وَفِي نَوَافِلِ النَّهَارِ الْإِسْرَارُ. » — Ibn Abi Zayd al-Qayrawani	English: «The Chafa'a and Witr are to be prayed overtly, and it is also desirable in the nafl prayers at night to pray overtly, and in the nafl prayers of the day covertly. » — Ibn Abi Zayd al-Qayrawani

== Liaison with Witr ==
Muslim jurists (fuqaha) believe that it is mandatory (mustahabb) to separate the two rak'ahs of the "Chafa'a prayer" by performing the taslim to get out of them, before continuing to perform the only rak'ah for the Witr prayer afterwards.

These jurists considered that the makruh ruling of the Islamic Ahkam applies to the case of joining the Chafa'a prayer with the Witr prayer afterwards without separating them by pronouncing the phrase of taslim.

The scholars of fiqh schools (madhahib) also relied on the rules of the principles of Islamic jurisprudence to determine that it is objectionable (makruh) to limit the performance of the Witr without being preceded by Chafa'a.

== Compensation ==
If a Muslim does not perform the Chafa'a and Witr prayers before dawn and the Fajr fard prayer, then he must make them up during the day to compensate for giving up on them during the previous night.

Since the supererogatory prayer (nafl prayer) is performed during the hours of the day in a silent voice, the fulfillment of the Chafa'a and Witr prayers is performed in a non-loud voice, as when the Duha prayer is performed in a non-loud voice.

Maliki jurists have acknowledged that the bass voice is a delegate (mustahabb) in reciting the two Chafa'a and Witr prayers, whether he prays them at night after the evening prayer (Isha) or makes up for them after the dawn prayer (Fajr).

== Gallery ==
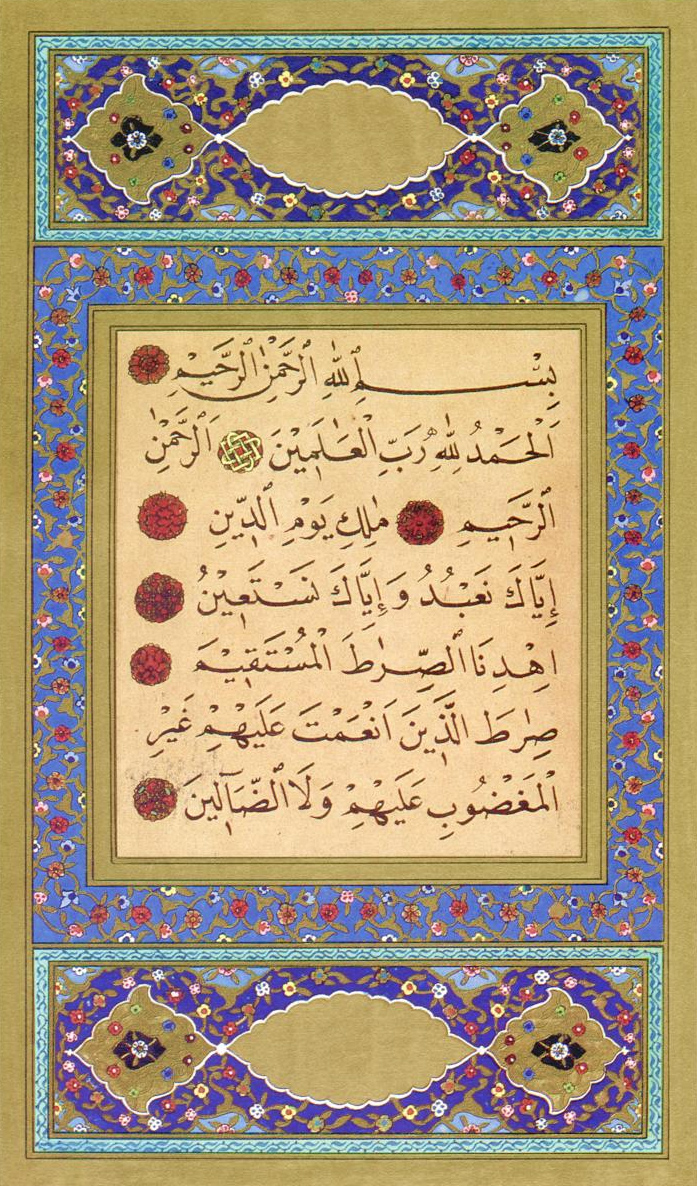
Al-Fatiha

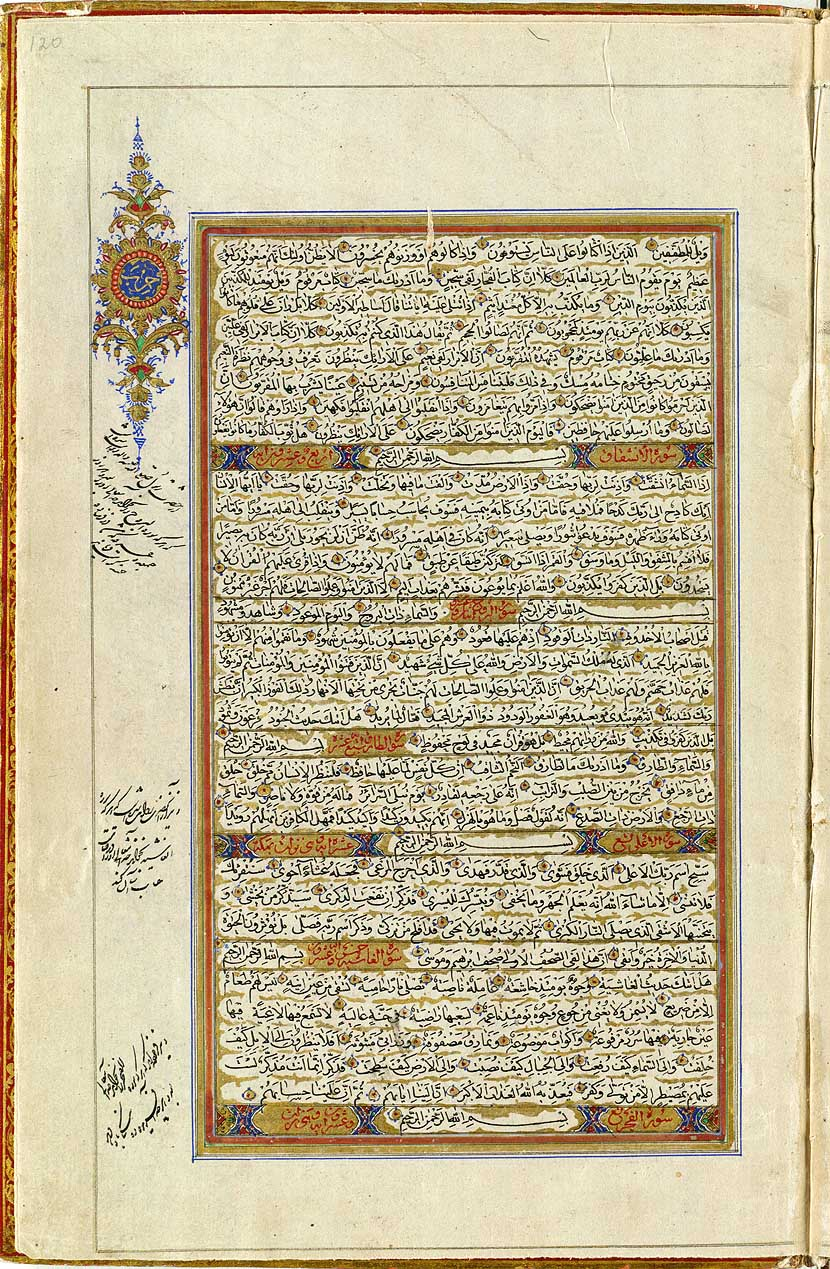
Al-Ala

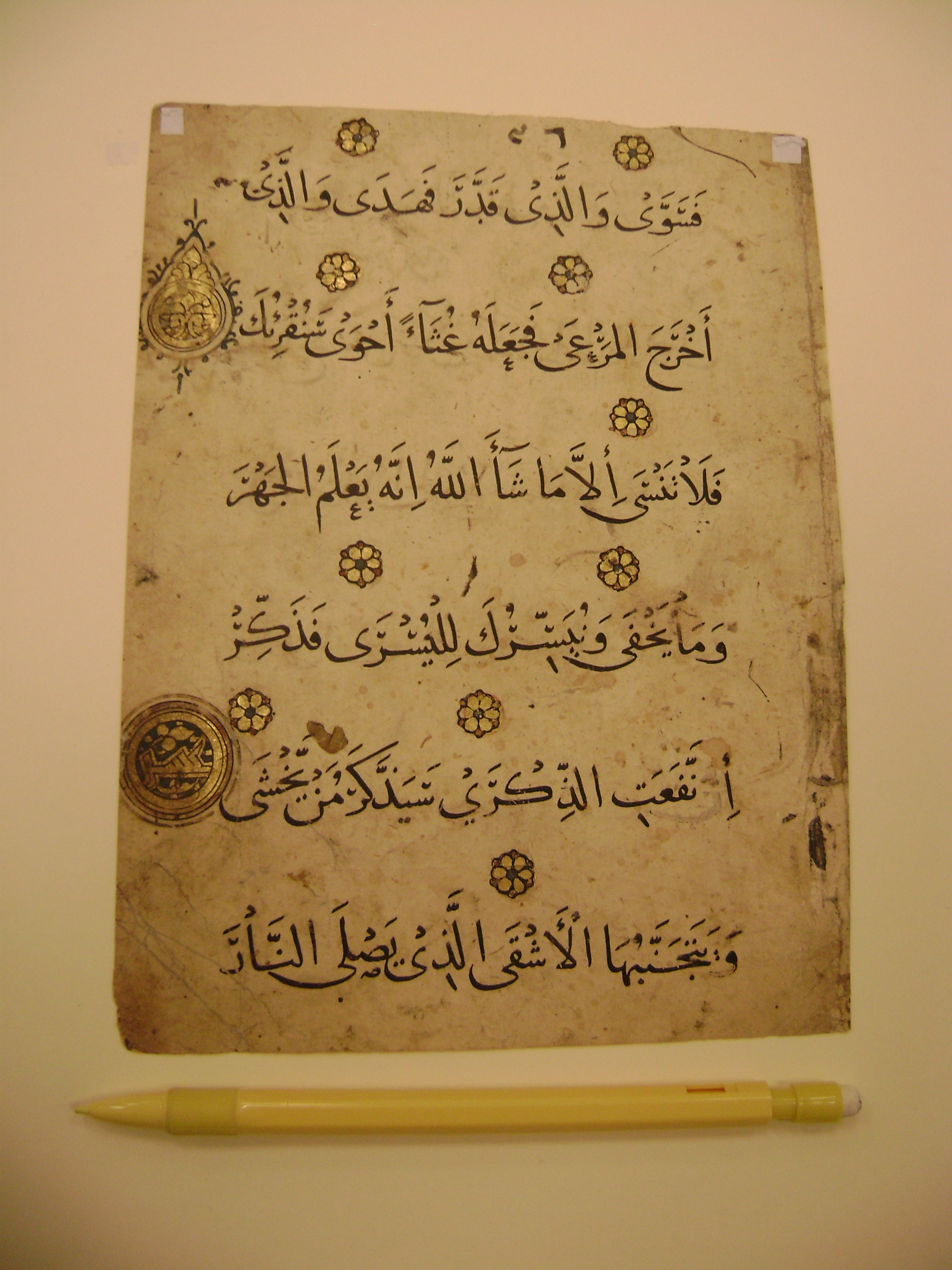
Al-Ala

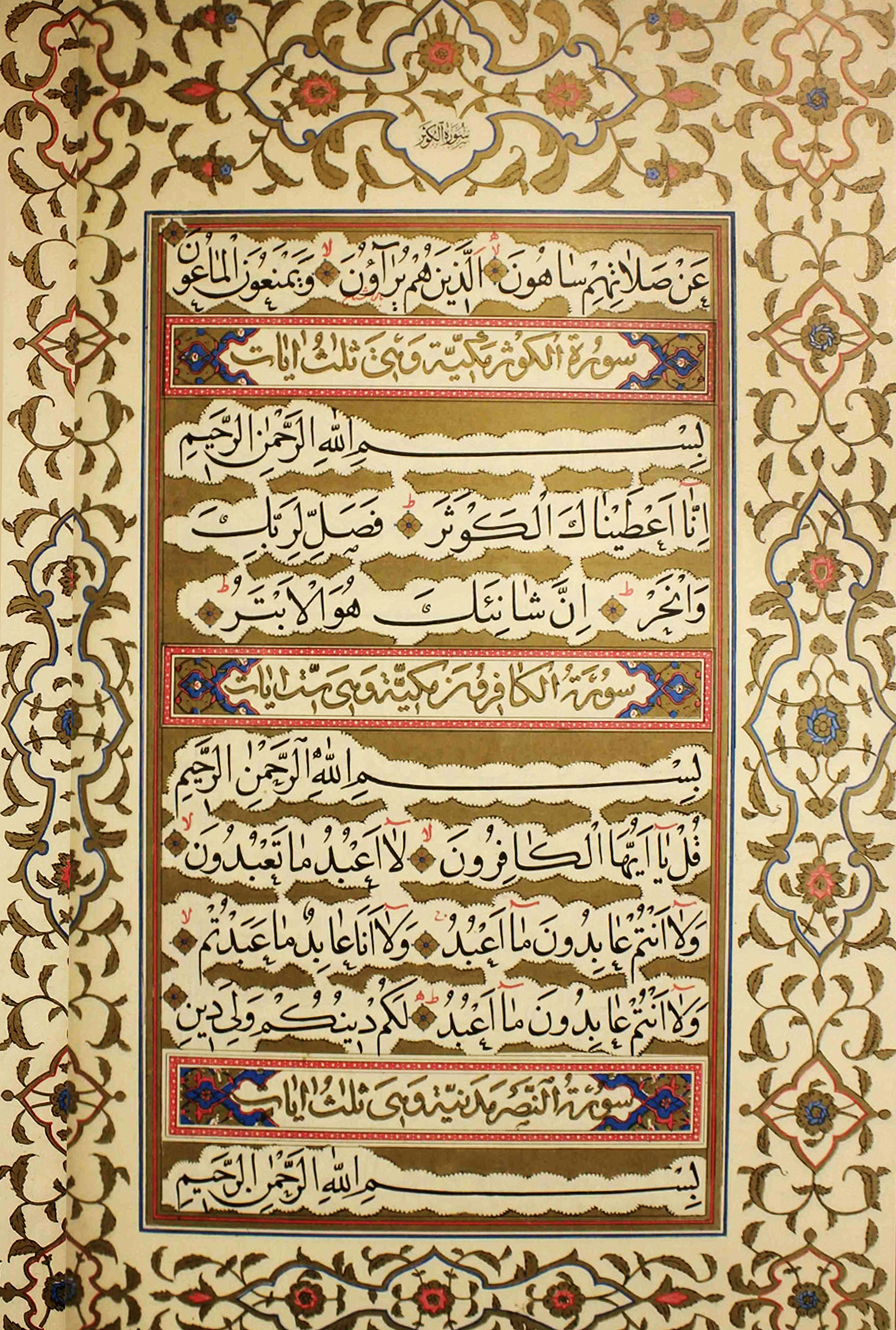
Al-Kafirun

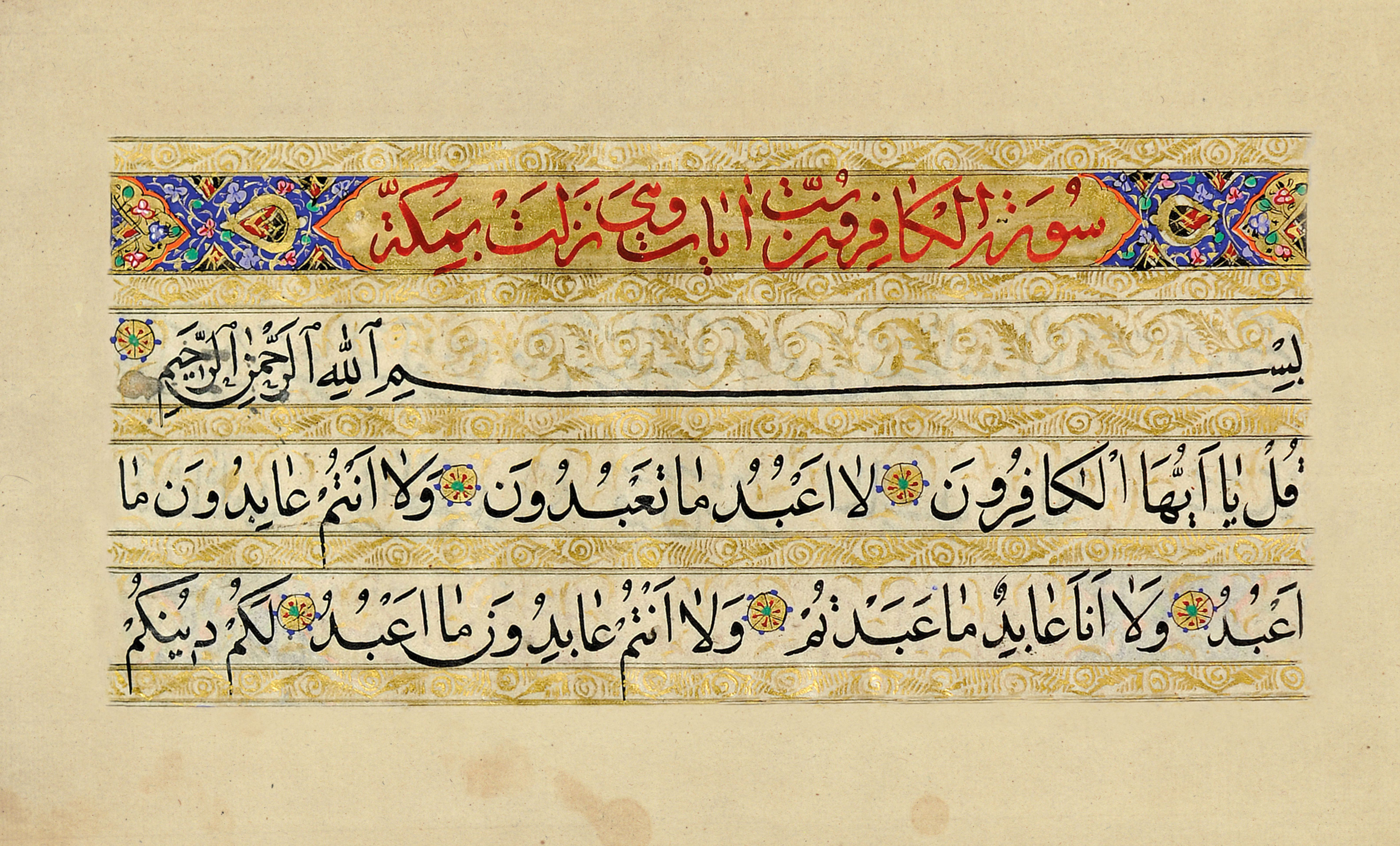
Al-Kafirun

== See also ==
- Witr
- Fajr nafl prayer
- Loud prayer
