= Rain prayer in Islam =

Islamic prayer used to request rain

Rain prayer
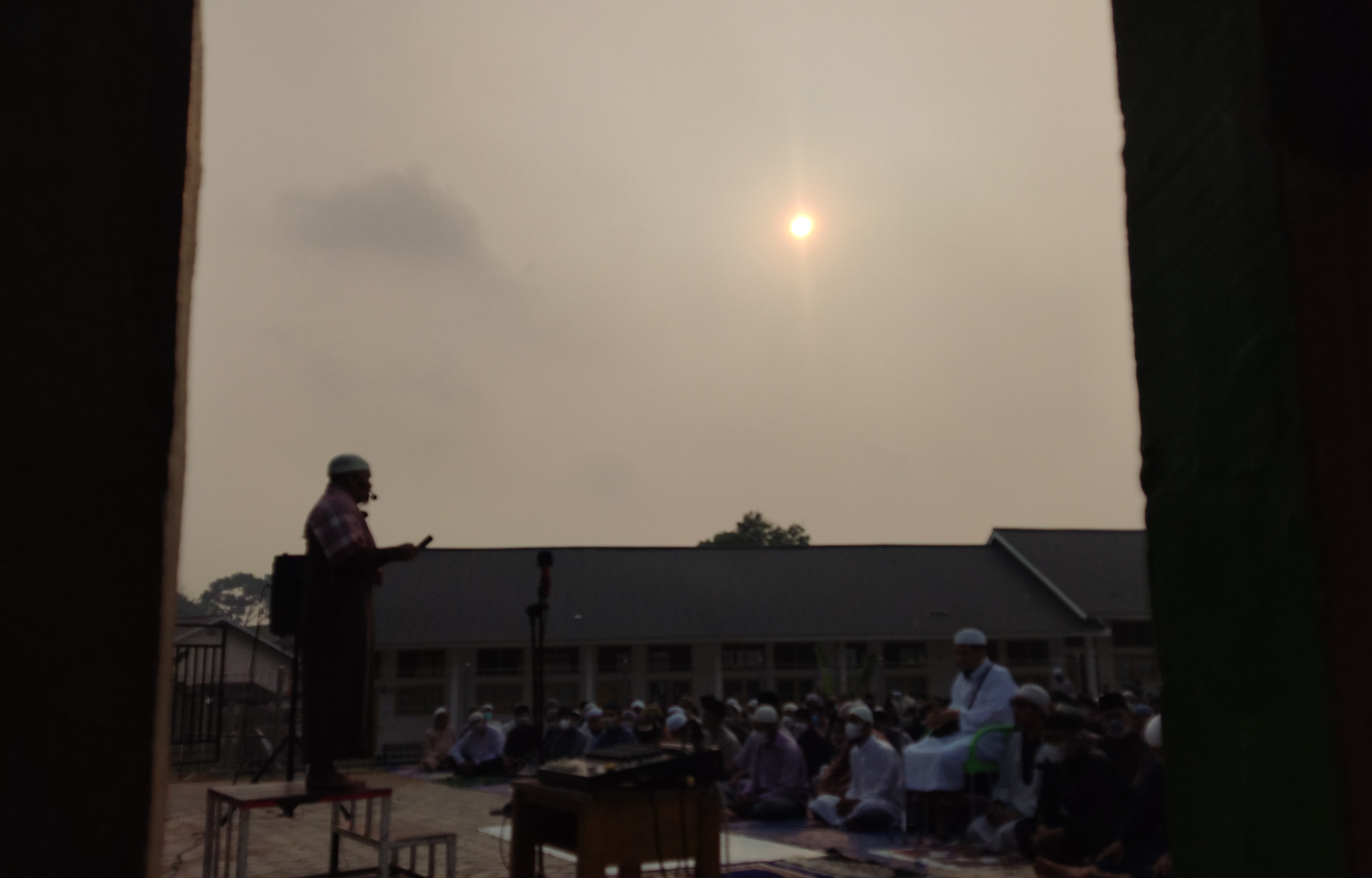
- Congregation Listens to the Sermon After Rain Prayer Against the Background of Smoke Haze in Jambi August 2026
- Official name: صلاة الاستسقاء
- Also called: Drought prayer
- Observed by: Muslims
- Type: Islamic
- Significance: A Muslim prayer offered to God seeking rain water.
- Observances: Sunnah prayers
- Begins: Duha
- Ends: Zenith - Noon
- Frequency: Occasionally
- Related to: Salah, Nafl prayer, Five Pillars of Islam

The Rain prayer (Arabic: صلاة الاستسقاء; ṣalāt al-istisqa, "rain request prayer") is a sunnah salah (Islamic prayer) for requesting and seeking rain water from God.

== Presentation ==
According to Muslim prophetic tradition, during a prolonged drought a man came to Muhammad as he was delivering the Khutba (sermon) of the Friday prayer in the Al-Masjid an-Nabawi mosque, to pray and implore for the rain to fall, for the men and the cattle and the orchards suffered from the lack of water, and in response, Muhammad raised his hands in Dua and prayed to God for a downpour. After his supplication was answered with torrential rain for days, Muhammad again prayed to God for the excessive rain to stop.

On another occasion Muhammad is said to have walked out of the mosque in broad daylight into an esplanade with the congregation of priors, and prayed for rain, then performed a prayer consisting of two rak'ahs as a group while reading Al-Fatiha aloud, as he did in Friday prayer.

== The Prayer ==
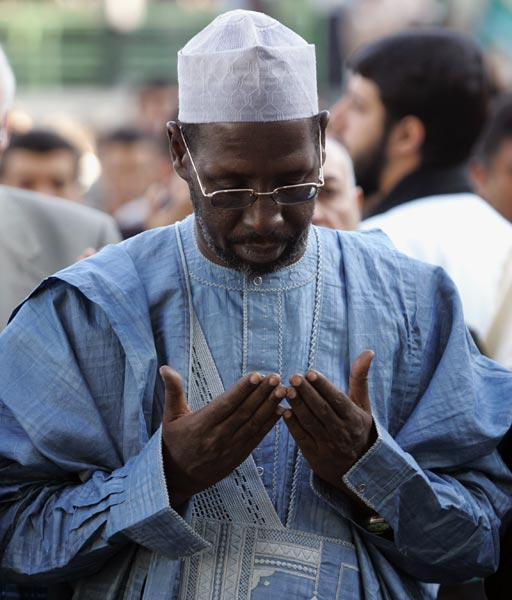
Raising hands in Dua

In Muslim agricultural societies, in times of calamity such as drought, the Imam is asked to provide spiritual help to the community in the hope of inducing God to fall rain.

== Practice ==
On the day fixed to perform this prayer, the imam of the mosque leads Muslims in a collective ritual to ask God to give them enough rain for agricultural and human drinking needs, and personal hygiene.

This prayer takes place in the same open space outside the mosque where the two Eid prayers are held annually.

== Prayers in different countries ==
Different countries across the world observed many times this prayer.

- Thousands of worshippers across the UAE came together on 7 December 2024, Saturday to observe rain prayers, ( Salat Al Istisqa) following a call by President His Highness Sheikh Mohamed bin Zayed Al Nahyan. The prayers were performed at 11am in mosques and prayer halls nationwide, as the country sought divine blessings for rainfall.
- In Saudi Arabia also offered this prayer many times in different years. King Salman called on Muslims in Saudi Arabia on 27 November to pray on Thursday for rain, the Saudi Press Agency reported. "Everyone who is able should be keen to perform the prayer, in accordance with the tradition of Prophet Muhammad," the Royal Court said.
