= Bismillah ceremony =

Cultural ceremony of South Asian Muslims

Bismillah ceremony, also known as Bismillahkhani, is a cultural ceremony celebrated mostly by Muslims from the subcontinent in countries such as Bangladesh, India and Pakistan. It marks the start for a child in learning to recite the Qur'an in its Arabic script. It is not a religiously prescribed milestone. The ceremony marks how a child should read the Qur’an and say prayers properly. The ceremony is named after the bismillah ("In the name of God"), the beginning words in the Qur'an.

== The ceremony ==
It is held for both boys and girls between the age 4 and 5, sometimes when the child turns four years, four months and four days. The child is dressed in a traditional dress and jewelry and is made to recite the opening phrase of the Qur'ran, Bism illāh ir-raḥmān ir-raḥīm (In the name of Allah, the Compassionate, the Merciful) (786).

It is traditionally a grand evening affair with family and friends. Lavish food is served for dinner and guests exchange hugs and gifts.

== See also ==
- Religious initiation rites
- Islam in South Asia
- Islam in Bangladesh
- Bengali Muslims
- Bishwa Ijtema
- Haal Khata
- Pohela Boishakh
- Shakrain
- Nouka Baich
- Mezban
- Furir Bari Iftari
- Jari gan
- Lathi Khela
- Sholakia
- Gor-E-Shahid Eidgah Maidan
- Dhanmondi Shahi Eidgah
