= Ghufayla Prayer =

Nafl Salah (supererogatory prayer)

Ghufayla Prayer (Arabic: صلاة الغفیلة) is a famous Nafl Salah (supererogatory prayer) which consists of two Rakats that is done between Maghrib and Isha prayers as a Mustahab (recommended) prayer.

The word "ghufayla" is the diminutive noun of "ghaflah" (neglect) and it means small neglect. There are hadiths which mention this Salah as an efficient prayer in the requests of people from Allah being responded to and likewise person's sins being forgiven by Him.

== Narrations ==
It is said from Ja'far al-Sadiq (the six Imam of Shia Islam) that he quoted from Muhammad al-Baqir that the Islamic prophet, Muhammad said about this recommended prayer that "say prayer in the time of neglect, although it is two Rakats, these two Rakats enter (you) in the paradise; it was asked Muhammad in a similar hadith that "when is the time of neglect?", then he answered "it is between Maghrib and Isha". According to another narration, Ja'far al-Sadiq quoted Muhammad as saying: Do not leave two Rakats of Ghufayla prayer which is between Maghrib and Isha.

== Method ==
The circumstances of Ghufayla prayer is as follows:

In the first Rakat, after Surah al-Hamd, (instead of any other Surah), these verses ought to be recited:

Wa-ḏā n-nūni ʾidh-dhahaba mughāḍiban fa-ẓanna ʾan lan naqdira ʿalayhi fa-nādhā fi-ẓ-ẓulumāti ʾan lā ʾilāha ʾillā ʾanta subḥānaka ʾinnī kuntu min aẓ-ẓālimīn. Fa-stajabnā lahu wa-najjaynāhu min al-ghammi wa-kadhālika nunjī l-mu'minīn.

In the 2nd rak'at of the prayer, after Surah al-Hamd, this dua/verse is recited (instead of other Surah):

Wa-ʿindahu mafātiḥu l-ghaybi lā yaʿlamuhā ʾillā huwa wa-yaʿlamu mā fi-l-barri wa-l-baḥri wa-mā tasquṭu min waraqatin ʾillā yaʿlamuhā wa-lā ḥabbatin fī ẓulumāti l-ʾarḍ wa-lā ratbin wa-lā yābisin ʾillā fī kitābim mubīn'

And in Qunut this dua is recited:

ʾAllāhumma ʾinni ʾasʾaluka bi-mafātiḥi l-ghaybi l-latī lā yaʿlamuhā ʾillā ʾanta ʾan tuṣalliya 'alā Muḥammadin wa-ʾāli Muḥammad

(At this part, the reciter ought to mention his/her wishes beginning: wa-ʾan tafʿal bi...). Afterwards, this dua ought to be recited:

ʾAllāhumma ʾanta waliyyu niʿmatī wa-l-qādiru ʿalā ṭalabatī taʿlamu ḥājatī fa-ʾasʾaluka bi-ḥaqqi Muḥammadin wa-ʾāli Muḥammadin ʿalayhi wa-ʿalayhimu s-salāmu lammā qaḍaytahā lī.

== See also ==
- Al Ghaffar
- Al-Afuw
