= Witr =

Muslim nighttime prayer

Witr prayer
- Official name: صلاة الوتر
- Also called: Imparity prayer
- Observed by: Muslims
- Type: Islamic
- Significance: An Islamic prayer offered to God after Isha prayer.
- Observances: Sunnah prayers, Salah times
- Begins: Chafa'a prayer
- Ends: Fajr nafl prayer
- Frequency: Daily
- Related to: Salah, Nafl prayer, Five Pillars of Islam, Islamic prayers

Witr (Arabic: وتر) is an Islamic prayer (salat) that is performed at night after Isha (night-time prayer) or before fajr (dawn prayer). Witr has an odd number of raka'at prayed in pairs, with the final raka'ah prayed separately.

According to Abdullah ibn Umar, Muhammad: "The night prayer is offered as two raka'at followed by two raka'at and so on and if anyone is afraid of the approaching dawn (fajr prayer), he should pray one raka'ah and this will be a witr for all the raka'at which he has prayed before."

In a hadith transmitted by Abu Darda, he states that Muhammad told him to do three things: to fast three days every month, to offer the witr salat before sleep, and to offer two raka'at sunnah for fajr.

There is a hadith that says that the best time for the witr salat is at night, and that those who fear that they will not be able to awake, or may die in their sleep, should perform the prayer before sleeping.

Ali ibn Abi Talib said, "The witr prayer is not required like your obligatory prayers but the Prophet would perform the witr prayer and say, 'O you people of the Quran, perform the witr prayer, for Allah is One and He loves the witr.'"(this is rated as daif (Weak))

== Du'ā' Salātu 'l-Witr ==
Narrated by Al-Hasan ibn Ali (who is the grandson of Muhammad) he said he was taught by Muhammad to say the qunūt du‘ā’ in Arabic as follows:

اللَّهُمَّ اهْدِنِي فِيمَنْ هَدَيْتَ وَعَافِنِي فِيمَنْ عَافَيْتَ وَتَوَلَّنِي فِيمَنْ تَوَلَّيْتَ وَبَارِكْ لِي فِيمَا أَعْطَيْتَ وَقِنِي شَرَّ مَا قَضَيْتَ إِنَّكَ تَقْضِي وَلاَ يُقْضَى عَلَيْكَ وَإِنَّهُ لاَ يَذِلُّ مَنْ وَّالَيْتَ وَلاَ يَعِزُّ مَنْ عَادَيْتَ تَبَارَكْتَ رَبَّنَا وَتَعَالَيْتَ

Allahumma ’hdi-niy fiyman hadayt, wa-‘āfi-niy fiyman ‘āfayt, wa-tawalla-niy fiyman tawallayt, wa-bārik liy fiy-mā ’a‘ṭayt, wa-qiniy sharra mā qaḍayt, inna-ka taqḍiy wa-lā yuqḍā ‘alayk, wa-inna-hu lā yaḏillu maw wālayt, wa-lā ya‘izzu man ‘ādayt, tabārakta Rabba-nā wa-ta‘ālayt.

“O Allah guide me among those You have guided, pardon me among those You have pardoned, befriend me among those You have befriended, bless me in what You have granted, and save me from the evil that You have decreed. Indeed You decree, and none can pass decree upon You, and indeed he is not humiliated whom You have befriended, and indeed he is not exalted whom You have taken as your enemy. Blessed are You our Lord and Exalted.”

Followers of the Hanafi school of thought commonly recite a second version of supplication of Witr prayer (Arabic:دعاء صلاة الوتر du‘ā’ ṣalātu ’l-Witr) as follows, which is said in the last raka‘at of witr (since one raka'at follows the Sunnah, in this case performing in odd numbers - 3, 5, 7, 9 or 11 raka'ats), first by saying takbir with hands up, then saying the following verses while standing after the last ruku‘ and before Prostration:

اَللَّهُمَّ إنا نَسْتَعِينُكَ وَنَسْتَغْفِرُكَ وَنُؤْمِنُ بِكَ ,وَنَتَوَكَّلُ عَلَيْكَ, وَنُثْنِئْ عَلَيْكَ الخَيْرَ. وَنَشْكُرُكَ وَلَا نَكْفُرُكَ وَنَخْلَعُ وَنَتْرُكُ مَنْ يَّفْجُرُكَ. اَللَّهُمَّ إِيَّاكَ نَعْبُدُ, وَلَكَ نُصَلِّئ وَنَسْجُدُ, وَإِلَيْكَ نَسْعأئ وَنَحْفِدُ, وَنَرْجُو رَحْمَتَكَ وَنَخْشآئ عَذَابَكَ, إِنَّ عَذَابَكَ بِالكُفَّارِ مُلْحَقٌ

Allahumma in-nā nasta‘iynu-ka wa-nastaghfiru-ka wa-nu’minu bi-ka, wa-natawaku ‘alay-ka, wa-nuth-nī ‘alay-ka ’l-khayr(a). Wa-nashkuru-ka wa-lā nakfuru-ka wa-nakhla‘u wa-natru-ku may yafjuru-k(a). Allahumma iyya-ka na‘abudu, wa-laka nuṣallī wa-nasjudu, wa-ilay-ka nas‘ā wa-naḥfidu, wa-narjū raḥmataka wa nakhshā ‘azaba-k(a), in-nā ‘azaba-ka bi’l-kuffāri mulḥiq.

"O Allah! We invoke you for help, and beg for forgiveness, and we believe in you and have trust in you and we praise you, in the best way we can; and we thank you and we are not ungrateful to you, and we forsake and turn away from the one who disobeys you. O Allah! We worship you and prostrate ourselves before you, and we hasten towards you and serve you, and we hope to receive your mercy and we dread your torment. Surely, the disbelievers shall incur your torment."

Ibn ‘Uqayl al-Hanbali narrated that duas narrated from Muhammad should be what is recited as regular word, and anything added to it is by way of a concession. He said: What is mustahabb in our view is that which was narrated by al-Hasan ibn ‘Ali from the Prophet (SWS): “Allahumma ihdini…” – the well-known hadīth.

He said: "If one adds to that the words narrated from ‘Umar (may Allah be pleased with him), “Allahumma in-nā nasta‘iynu-ka… (O Allah, we seek Your help)…”, there is nothing wrong with that. End quote."

This was quoted by Ibn Muflih in his comment on al-Muharrar, 1/89

In some cases, the one who prays can perform the du‘ā’ ṣalātu ’l-Witr, it is permissible to make the qunūt before going into ruku‘ (bowing), or it may be recited when one stands up straight after the ruku‘.

"Humaid says: "I asked Anas: 'Is the qunut before or after the ruku?' he said: 'We would do it before or after."

This hadith was related by Ibn Majah and Muhammad ibn Nasr. In Fath al-Bari, Ibn Hajar al-Asqalani comments that its chain is faultless.

== Name variations ==
Region/country	Language	Main
Arab World	Arabic	صلاة الوتر (Ṣalāh al-Witr)
Iran, Afghanistan, Uzbekistan and Tajikistan	Persian	نماز وتر (Namaz e veter)
Pakistan, India	Urdu, Hindi	وتر, वित्र (Vitr, vitar)
Turkey	Turkish	Vitir namazı
Azerbaijan	Azerbaijani	Vitr namazı
Uzbekistan	Uzbek	Vitr namozi
Albania, Kosovo	Albanian	Namazi i vitri, vitrit
Balkans	Bosnian, Croatian, Montenegrin, Serbian	Vitr-namaz
Bangladesh, India	Bengali	বিতির (Bitir), বিতর (Bitor)
Somalia	Somali	Salaada witir
Southeast Asia	Bahasa Indonesia, Bahasa Melayu, Basa Jawa	Salat witir, solat witir

== Sources ==
- Translation of Sahih Bukhari, Book 16: Witr Prayer Hadith no 111, 112
- The Witr prayer
