= List of prayers =

This is a list of prayers for various religions.

== Christian prayers ==
=== Common to several denominations ===
- Compline
- Epiclesis
- Glory Be to the Father
- Good Friday Prayer
- Grace at Meals, including some non-Christian versions
- Litany
- Lord's Prayer
- Magnificat (Song of Mary)
- Prayer for the dead
- Serenity Prayer
- Trinitarian formula
- Vespers
- Vigil

=== Catholic prayers ===
- Angelus
- Compline
- Confiteor
- Liturgy of the Hours
- Hail Mary
- Magnificat (Song of Mary)
- Make Me an Instrument of Your Peace
- Mass
- Memorare
- Morning Prayers
- Nicene Creed
- Prayer to St. Michael the Archangel
- Rosary
- Vespers

=== Triduum Marian ===
- Act of Contrition
- Prayer for all Sorts and Conditions
- For General Thanksgiving

=== Eastern Orthodox prayers ===
Christian prayers specific to the Eastern Orthodox Church and those Eastern Catholic Churches which follow the Byzantine Rite:

- Jesus Prayer
- Akathist
- Axion Estin
- Theotokion
- Ektenia

=== Other denominations ===
- Wesley Covenant Prayer (Methodist)
- Daily Prayer for Peace (Community of Christ)

== Islamic prayers ==
Salah, ritual Islamic prayer, prescribed five times daily:

- Fajr – the dawn prayer. It is a two Rakat Salaah.
- Dhuhr – the early afternoon prayer. It is a four Rakat Salaah.
- Asr – the late afternoon prayer. It is a four Rakat Salaah.
- Maghrib – the sunset prayer. It is a three Rakat Salaah.
- Isha'a – the night prayer. It is a four Rakat Salaah.

Besides the five daily prayers, other notable forms of salaah include:

- Jumu'ah – weekly congregational prayer (replaces dhuhr on Fridays two rakat along with khutba)
- Sunnah - These prayers are recommended to be performed as by the Islamic prophet Muhammad on a regular basis throughout the lifetime; missing once or twice so that it does not become fard is called Sunnat.
  - 2 Rak'ats Sunnat for Fajr. (The Fajr sunnat is offered before Fajr prayers)
  - 6 Rak'ats Sunnat for Zuhr. (The Zuhr sunnat is 4 rakats before Zuhr and 2 rakats after zuhur.)
  - 2 Rak'ats Sunnat for Maghrib. (The sunnat for maghrib should be offered after Maghrib prayers.)
  - 2 Rak'ats Sunnat for Isha. (The sunnat for Isha is 2 rakat after Isha and followed by 3 rakat of Witr.)
  - However, there is no Sunnat for Asr

- Nafil Salaah

- Salaat al-Layl
- Salat of Ja’far e Tayyar - The best time to perform it is on Friday before noon. It is four Rakat Salat, divided into two parts 2 x 2 rakat.
- Salaat -e-Gufaila - Ghufayla prayers is one of the Mustahab prayers which is offered between Maghrib and Isha prayers.
- Namaz/Salaat of Eid/festival
- Eid Salaah – performed during the two primary Islamic festivals, Eid al-Fitr and Eid al-Adha
- Tarawih – lengthy night-time prayers during Ramadan containing 20 rakahs, often praying 8-12 rakahs of salatul Tarawih.

- Dua, or "supplication"
- Dhikr, or "remembrance of God", often involving various repeated phrases, most notably:
  - Subhanallah
  - Alhamdulillah
  - Allahu akbar – see takbir
  - La ilaha ill Allah – see Six Kalimas
  - Astaghfirullah

== Hindu prayers ==
- Prayer or worship is considered to be an integral part of the Hindu religion. The chanting of mantras is the most popular form of worship in Hinduism. Yoga and meditation are also considered as a form of devotional service. The Om sign is a sacred sound and a spiritual symbol in Hinduism.

The Vedas are a collection of liturgy (mantras, hymns). Stuti is a general term for devotional literary compositions, but literally means praise.

The Hindu devotional Bhakti movements emphasizes repetitive prayer. Stemming from the universal Soul, or Brahman, prayer is focused on the personal forms of Devas/Devis, such as Vishnu, Vishnu's Avatars, Rama & Krishna, Shiva as well as Shakti, or Shakti's forms such as Lakshmi or Kali. Ganesha is also a popular deity in Bhakti.

Before the process of ritual involving the invoking of various deities for the fulfillment of needs (great/small, varying in urgency), came the human aspiration for the highest truth. The foundational monism of Hinduism pertains to the one Brahman. Brahman, which summarily can be called the unknowable, true, infinite and blissful Divine Ground, is the source & being of all existence from which the Cosmos spring. This is the essence of the Vedic system. The following prayer was part & parcel of all Vedic ceremonies, continuing to be invoked in Hindu temples presently throughout India and the World.

== Jain prayers ==
- Namokar Mantra
- Bhaktamara Stotra
- Uvasagharam Stotra

== Jewish prayers ==
- List of Jewish Prayers and Blessings
- Tefillah prayers prescribed 3 times a day by observant Jews and 4 times a day during every Shabbat service:
  - Shacharit - Dawn/Morning prayer
  - Mincha - Afternoon prayer
  - Maariv - Evening prayer
  - Mussaf - Additional prayer that is recited on Shabbat, Yom Tov, Chol Hamoed, and Rosh Chodesh.
- Shema Yisrael
- V'ahavta
- Amidah
- Kaddish
- Kol Nidre
- Aleinu
- Selichot
- Ne'ila
- Berakhah (Jewish blessings) According to Jewish tradition, religious Jews are required to recite 100 berakhot (blessings) each day.

== Sikh prayers ==
The Sikhs believe in going to bed early, then waking up early the next morning. The Sikhs call early morning as Amrit wela. Most of the Sikhs (especially baptized) wake up at this time of day and pray

=== Morning prayers ===
In the morning most of the Sikhs recite the path by sitting with their family or sitting alone. They recite 5 paths (holy chapters) as directed by the tenth guru of Sikhs Sri Guru Gobind Singh.

The list of 5 paths is:

1. Japji Sahib
2. Jaap Sahib
3. Tav Prasad Savaiye
4. Chaupai Sahib
5. Anand Sahib

They try to perform these prayers on a daily basis.

=== Evening prayers ===
In the evening the Sikhs perform the path of Rehraas Sahib.

=== Night prayers ===
During night time the Sikhs recite Kirtan Sohila before sleeping.

Though the Sikhs pray these special prayers they are always in touch with their God by reciting Waheguru for the whole day, follow the orders of their Guru Nanak Dev Ji to do work but keep their attention towards God.
