= Sholakia =

Locality near Kishoregonj, Bangladesh

Sholakia Eidgah Maidan
- শোলাকিয়া
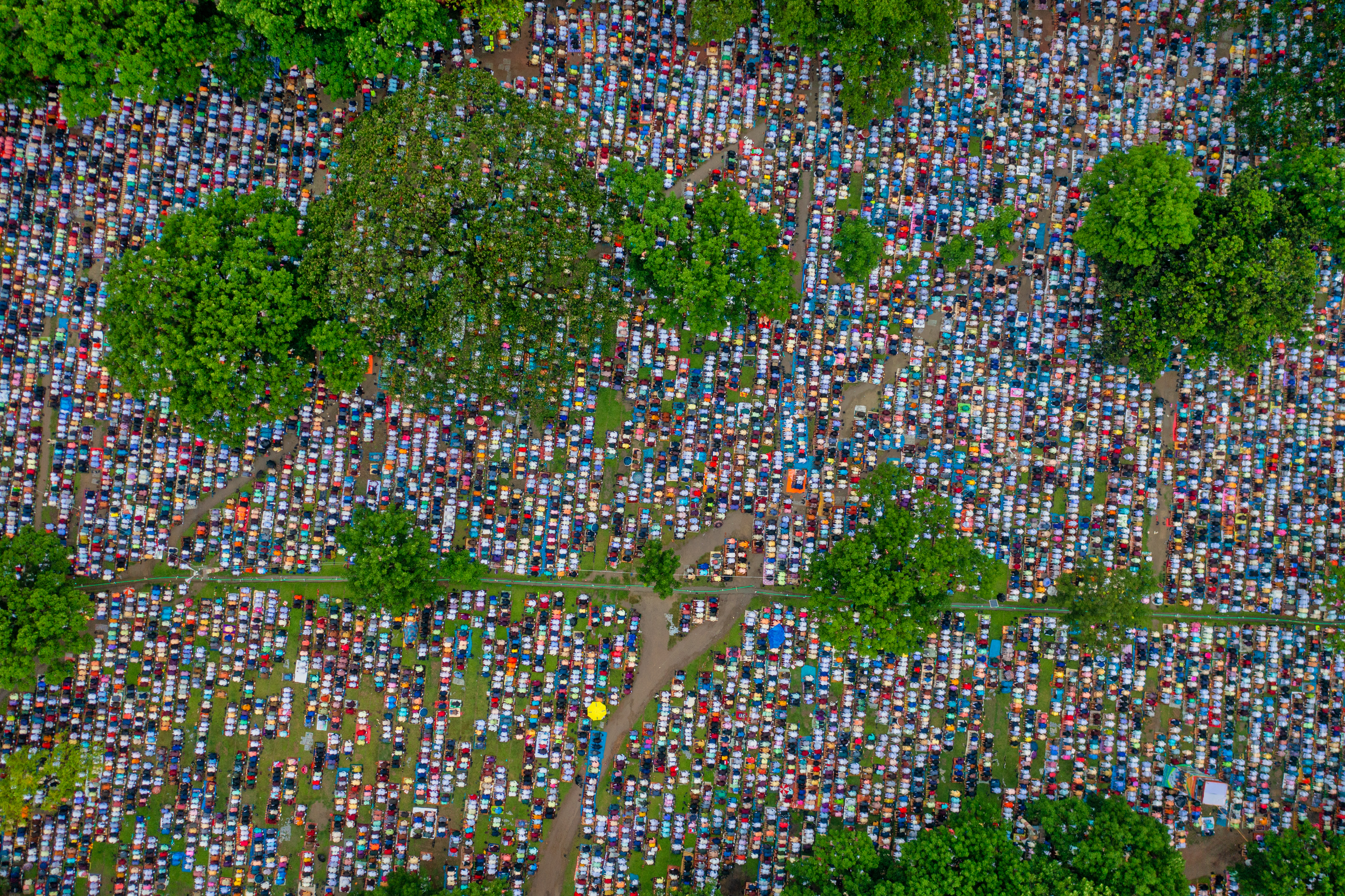
- Eid prayers at Sholakia Eidgah Maidan

- Location within Bangladesh

Religion
- Affiliation: Islam
- Branch/tradition: Sunni Islam
- District: Kishoreganj District
- Leadership: Mufti Abul Khair Muhammad Saifullah

Location
- Location: Kishoreganj, Bangladesh
- Interactive map of Sholakia Eidgah Maidan
- Administration: 51-member committee led by the Deputy Commissioner
- Coordinates: 24°26′00″N 90°47′00″E

Architecture
- Type: Eidgah
- Established: 1828

Specifications
- Capacity: 600,000+
- Site area: 7 acres

Sholakia (Bengali: শোলাকিয়া) is a locality near Kishoreganj town in Bangladesh. It is famous for its Eidgah where the largest congregation of Eid prayer in Bangladesh is held on the occasion of Eid ul-Fitr, the day of celebration after the Ramadan, the month of fasting. 400,000 people join the prayer on every Eid. The Eidgah, on the bank of river Norsunda is reported to be 7 acres (2.8 ha) in size, accommodating 250 rows or about 150,000 of participants for every congregation. An equal number of participants take part in the prayer using the fields, roads and courtyards around the Eidgah.

A small number of elites make use of the two-storied mimbar (prayer hall with towers for adhan) nearby, which can accommodate about 500 people. The prayer on the occasion of Eid ul-Adha, the festival of qurbani or sacrifice, is also comparably large. The regular population of Sholakia is 1,026, consisting 180 households.

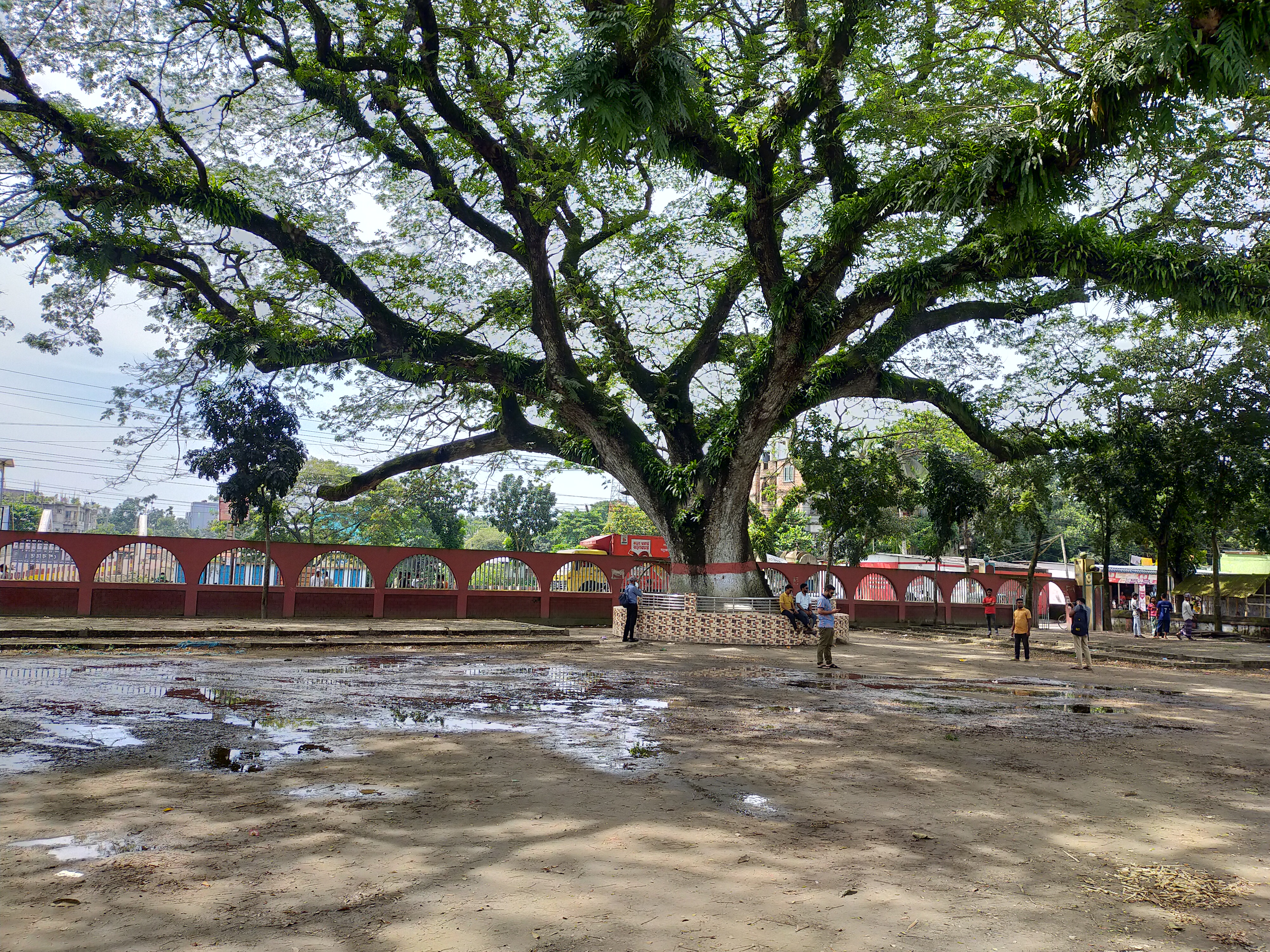
Sholakia Eidgah

== Organization ==
Farid Uddin Masud has been conducting the eid prayers since 2009. The Eidgah has an executive committee of 51 members with the District Commissioner (DC) as the president. For every congregation, district police administration deploys a large number of police officers equipped with metal detectors, mine detectors and close circuit cameras. Medical teams and fire brigades are also kept alert during the prayers. Eid ul-Fitr is the biggest religious festival in the Muslim-dominated Bangladesh, followed by Eid ul-Adha.

== History ==
The Eidgah was founded by Sayyid Ahmad, whose father Sayyid Ibrahim is believed to have originated from what is now Saudi Arabia. Ibrahim journeyed through Yemen and eventually settled in 24 Parganas of Bengal, where he propagated Islam and actively resisted various subversive actions carried out by British colonial authorities against the local Bengalis. His missionary activities later took him to Comilla and ultimately to Mymensingh. After several years, he embarked on the Hajj pilgrimage to Mecca, while his wife remained in Nikli, a village in Kishoreganj, Mymensingh. It was during this period that Sayyid Ahmad was born. Ahmad received his early education in Azimpur, Dhaka. In his youth, he became affiliated with the Fakir Movement, a socio-religious resistance effort rooted in the Mymensingh region. Toward the close of the 18th century, he relocated to a village that housed the mazar (mausoleum) of Bora Pir (Shāh Muʿizz al-Dīn Majnūn), establishing the Saheb Bari there, where he commenced his religious and social work in earnest. In 1827, Ahmad founded a mosque in Sholakia and in the following year, he organised the region’s first Eid congregation on the open grounds of his own taluk. This event holds particular historical significance, as local oral tradition claims that approximately 125,000 people were in attendance. It was then that the village was named "Sholakia", a term derived from the Bengali shoa (meaning one and a quarter) and lakh (meaning one hundred thousand), referencing the massive turnout. Sayyid Ahmad's religious and community leadership had helped to establish Sholakia as a prominent center of Islamic devotion in eastern Bengal. The development of the Eidgah was facilitated by the patronage of local aristocracy, particularly the Zamindars of Jangalbari and Haybatnagar. In 1950, Dewan Mannan Dad Khan of Haybatnagar, a direct descendant of Baro-Bhuiyan chief Isa Khan, formally donated 4.35 acres (17,600 square meters) of land to the Eidgah, solidifying its role as a central site for Islamic worship in the region.

== Other features ==
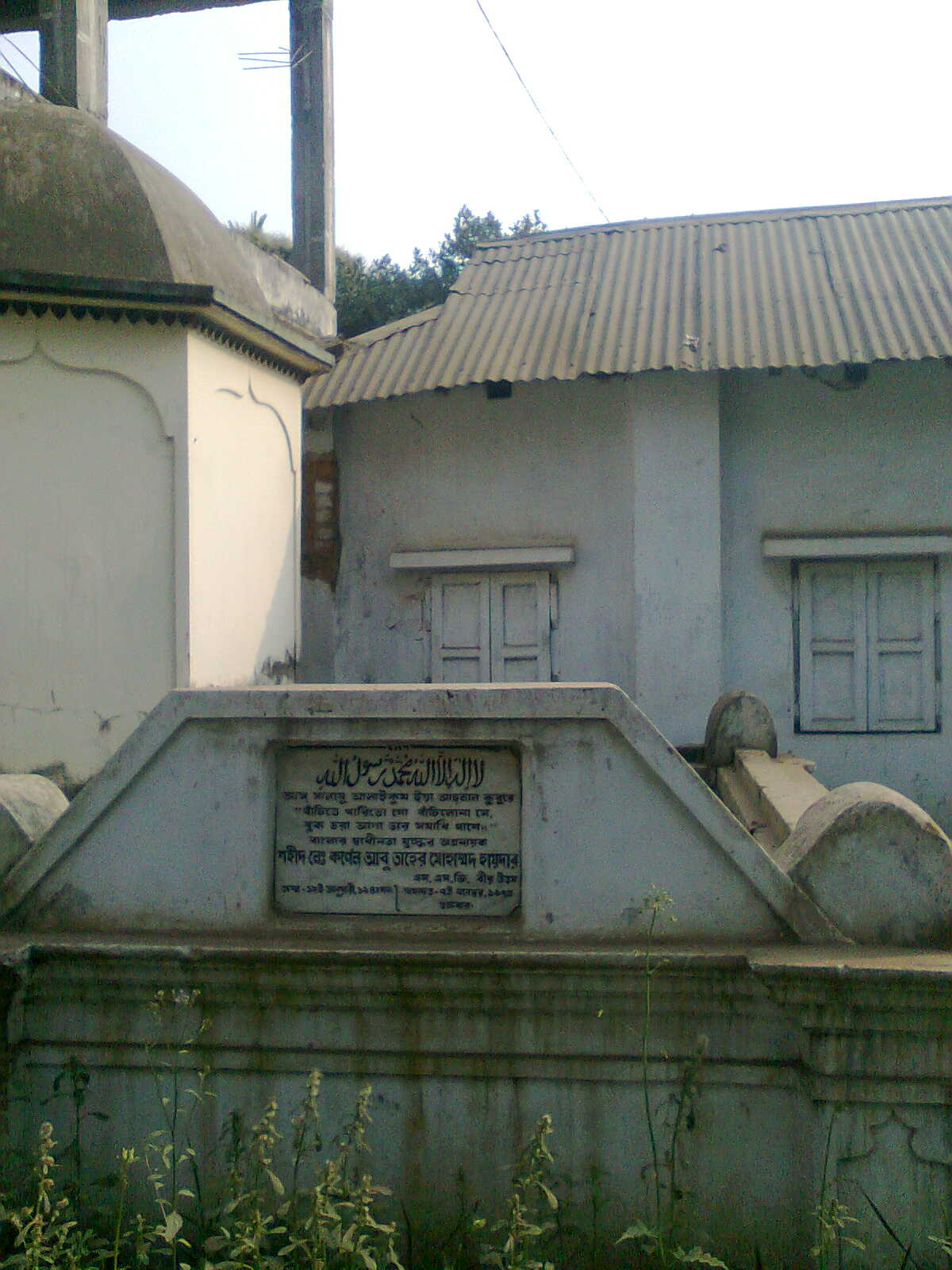
Grave of Colonel A.T.M. Haider (Bir Uttom) in Sholakia

Sholakia, standing by Kishoreganj-Karimganj road, the commercial artery of the area, is almost free from arsenic contamination of groundwater, a menace in the Ganges Basin and elsewhere Binangladesh. Divided into Kharompatty and Kolapara mahallas, Sholakia has a sporting club, Sholakia Sporting Club, that takes part in local level soccer tournaments. Manufacturing bricks and tiles is a major commercial activity here.

== 2016 bombing ==
On 7 July 2016, half an hour before prayers were to begin Thursday morning, a bombing at the site killed two police officers and a civilian. A group of men approached a police checkpoint, at a high school near the prayer ground, and set off a bomb, said Tofazzel Hossain, an assistant superintendent of the Kishoreganj police. "They attacked the police out of nowhere," said Mr. Hossain, who said some of the attackers had been carrying guns and bladed weapons. Six other police officers were seriously wounded, said a police inspector, Mueid Chowdhury, but they were expected to survive. At least five civilians were also hurt. The police killed one of the attackers and arrested two others, Mr. Hossain said. A search was underway for the other assailants. There was no immediate claim of responsibility for the attack.

== See also ==
- Dhanmondi Shahi Eidgah
- Sylhet Shahi Eidgah
- Baitul Mukarram
