= Purani Idgah =

Religion
- Affiliation: Islam

Location
- Location: Hyderabad, Telangana, India

Architecture
- Type: Mosque
- Style: Islamic

Purani Idgah is an ancient Idgah and mosque located in Hyderabad, Telangana, India. It is on the city's heritage list. The most attractive aspect of Idgah is its two astounding pillars having resemblance to the Charminar.

== Trust ==
Purani Idgah is managed by a trust.

== History ==
Purani Idgah was built in circa 1700.
