= Kheri Eidgah =

Eidgah and mosque in Kheri, Uttar Pradesh, India

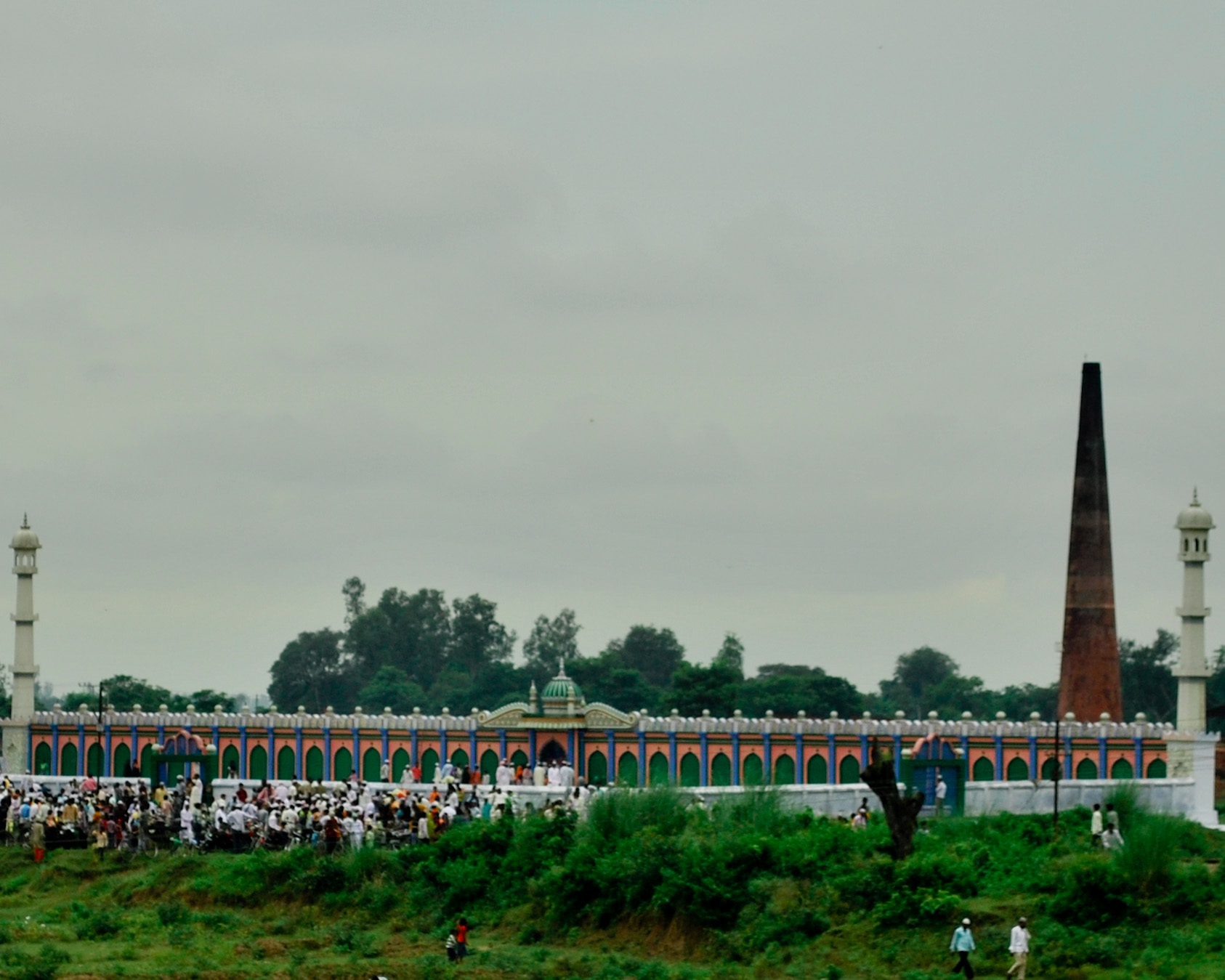
- The eidgah and mosque in 2010

- Location of the eidgah and mosque in Uttar Pradesh

Religion
- Affiliation: Islam
- Ecclesiastical or organizational status: Eidgah and mosque
- Status: Active

Location
- Location: Kheri, Lakhimpur Kheri District, Uttar Pradesh
- Country: India
- Interactive map of Kheri Eidgah
- Coordinates: 27°54′36″N 80°47′24″E

Architecture
- Type: Mosque architecture
- Style: Indo-Islamic

Specifications
- Capacity: 2,000 worshippers
- Dome: One
- Minaret: Two

The Kheri Eidgah is an eidgah and mosque, located near the railway tracks between Lakhimpur and Kheri, in the Lakhimpur Kheri District of the state of Uttar Pradesh, India.

== Overview ==
The foundation of the historic eidgah was laid in the northwestern part of Kheri Town, outside the dwelling area.

The courtyard of the mosque can be reached from entrances on three sides. On the day of Eid, the area outside mosque is used for food stalls, shops and by street entertainers.

== See also ==
- Islam in India
- List of mosques in India
