= Muhammad Naqib-ur-Rahman =

Pakistani Islamic Sufi scholar

Muhammad Naqeeb Ur Rahman
- Title: Pir

Personal life
- Born: 4 January 1953 (age 73) Eidgah Sharif, Rawalpindi

Religious life
- Religion: Islam, specifically the Naqshbandi Sufi order

Senior posting
- Based in: Eidgah Sharif
- Predecessor: Hazrat Khawaja Habib Ur Rehman

Shayk Naqib-ur-Rahman (born 4 January 1953), is a Pakistani Islamic Sufi scholar and leader. He is also Custodian of the Holy Shrine of Eidgah Sharif, Rawalpindi, Pakistan.
