= Eidgah =

South Asian term for an open-air Eid prayer enclosure

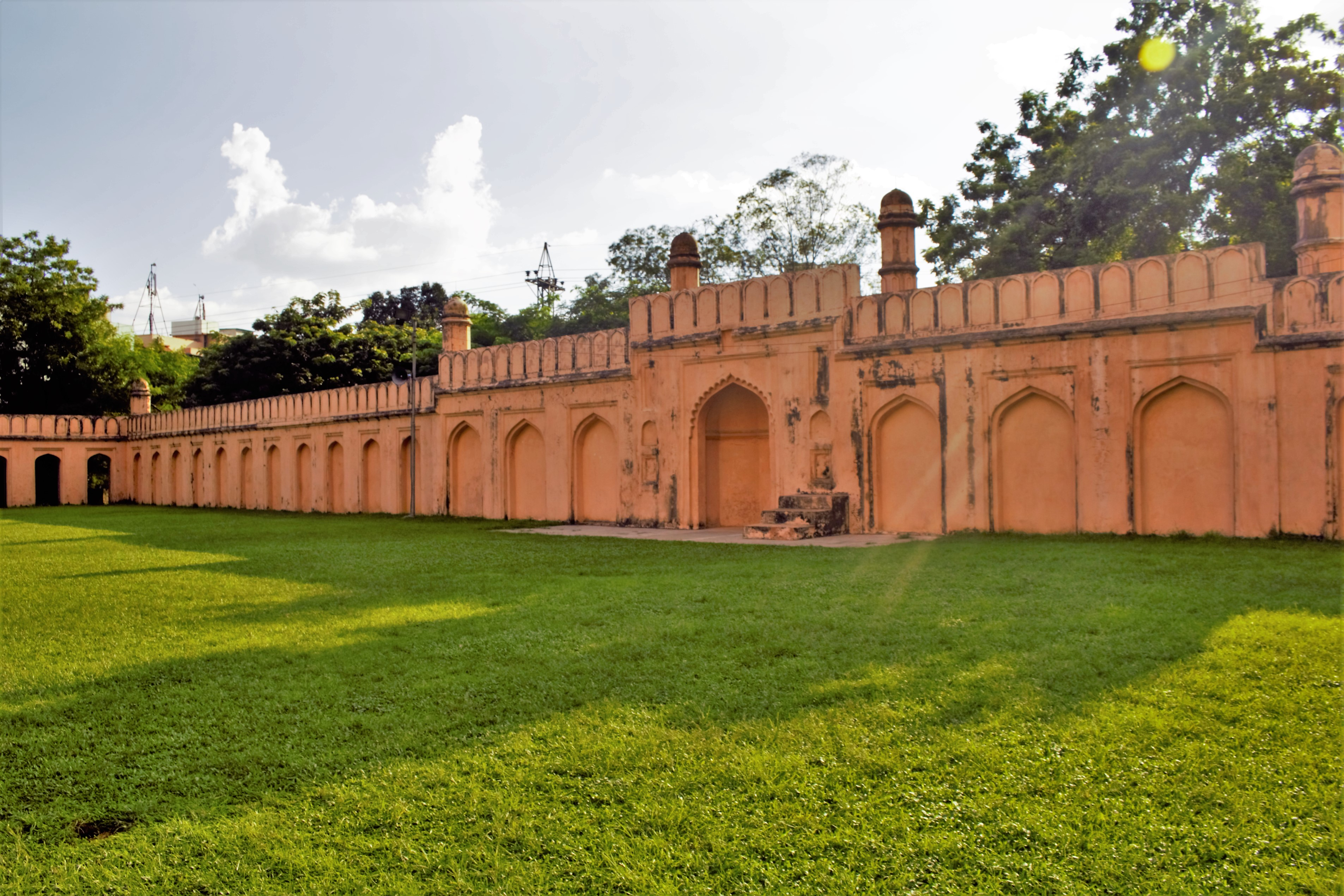
Dhanmondi Shahi Eidgah Dhaka, Bangladesh

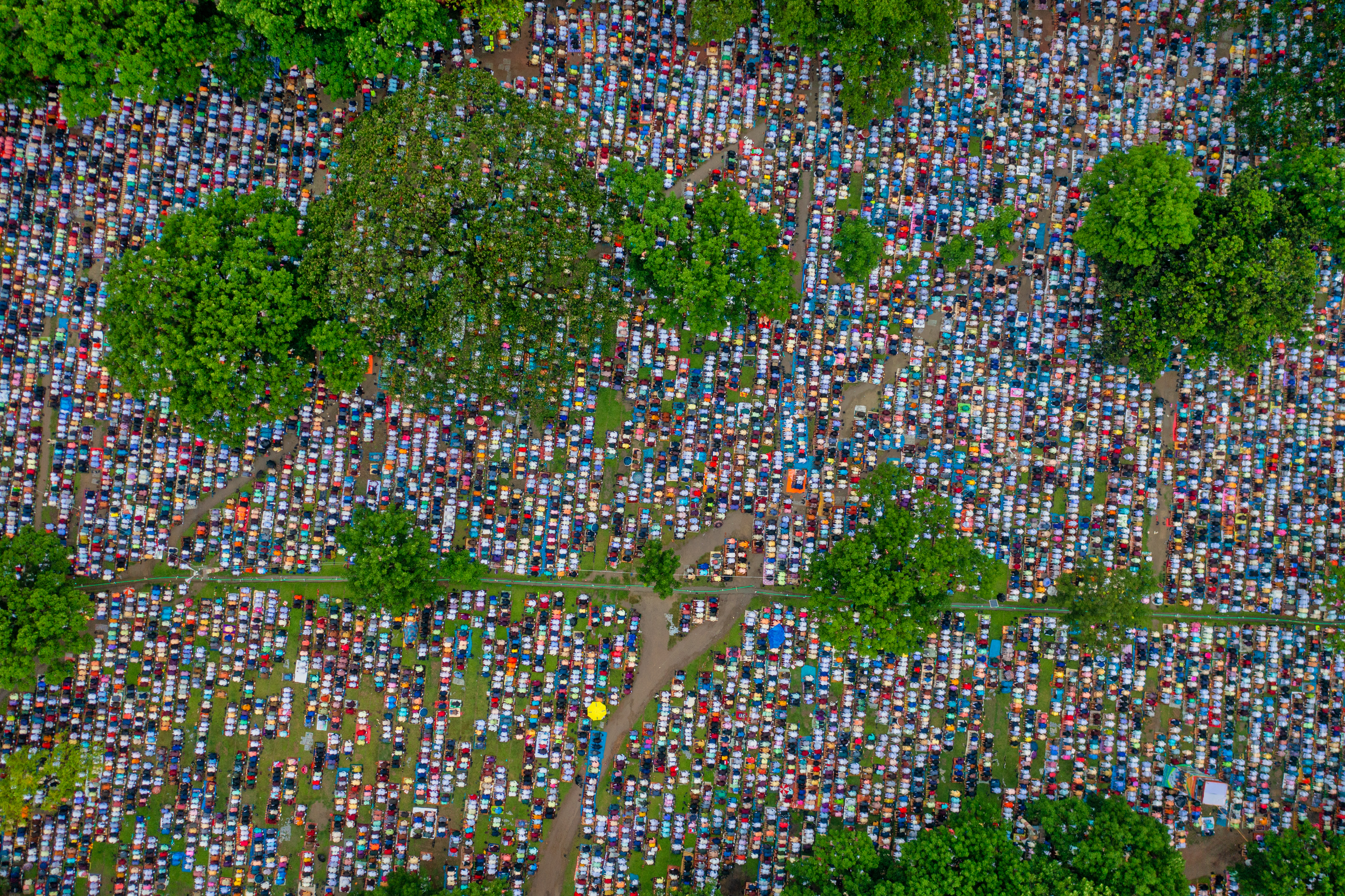
Sholakia Eidgah, Kishoreganj, the largest Eidgah in terms of congregation in Bangladesh

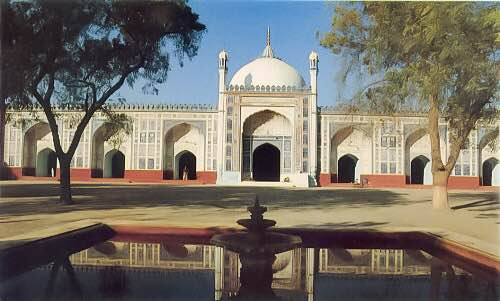
Shahi Eid Gah Mosque, Multan, Pakistan

Eidgah or Idgah, also Eid Gah or Id Gah (Persian: عیدگاه "site of Eid [observances]"; Bengali: ঈদগাহ; Punjabi: عید گاہ; Urdu: عید گاہ; Hindi: ईदगाह) is a term used in South Asian Islamic culture for the open-air enclosure usually outside the city (or at the outskirts) reserved for Eid prayers offered in the morning of Eid al-Fitr and Eid al-Adha. It is usually a public place that is not used for prayers at other times of the year. On the day of Eid, the first thing Muslims do in the morning is gather usually at a large open ground and offer special prayers, in accordance with the Sunnah (traditions of Muhammad). Although Eidgah traditionally denotes the site of Eid prayers, the term may also be applied to a musalla, the open space outside a mosque, or other open grounds where Eid prayers are performed, due to the lack of a specific Islamic term for a site of Eid observance. The Eidgah is mentioned in the famous Bengali poem by Kazi Nazrul Islam, O Mon Romzaner Oi Rozar Sheshe.

== Prescriptions in the Sharia ==
The first "Eidgah" was located at the outskirts of Medina nearly 1,000 footsteps from Masjid al Nabawi.^{,} There are several scholarly opinions regarding praying at Eidgahs, prescribing it in the Sharia (Islamic law):

- Complying with the Sunnah, performing of the Eid Salah at the outskirts of the town is better and more virtuous, than performing it in the town (i.e. in a mosque).
- The Eid Salah performed in the mosque is complete, but performing it in the Eidgah is Sunnah. To not perform Eid Salah in the Eidgah without a valid excuse, is contrary to the Sunnah.
- The Eid Salah should be [performed in] a huge Jam'ah (congregation) on the outskirts of the town. In this way the brotherhood in Islam (i.e. among Muslims) is manifested. In the big cities it is difficult to have Eidgahs on the outskirts of the city, therefore a large open plain ground should be chosen for the Eidgah. Or if needed, the prayer can be performed in the mosque, which will be correct. But [people should try praying in an Eidgah] as far as possible, [since] one huge Jam'ah is superior to many small Eid [Jam'ahs].
- Performing of the Eid Salah in the Eidgah is [classified as] Sunnah al-Muakkadah (emphasized or substantiated Sunnah). Without any valid excuse, the one who does not perform his Eid Salah in the Eidgah is worthy of being reprimanded and taken to task and this kind of a person is a sinner. If the Eidgah is a distance away and it is inconvenient for the old and sick, then the Fuqaha (Islamic jurists) have given permission for them to perform Eid Salah in the mosque.

== List of Eidgahs ==
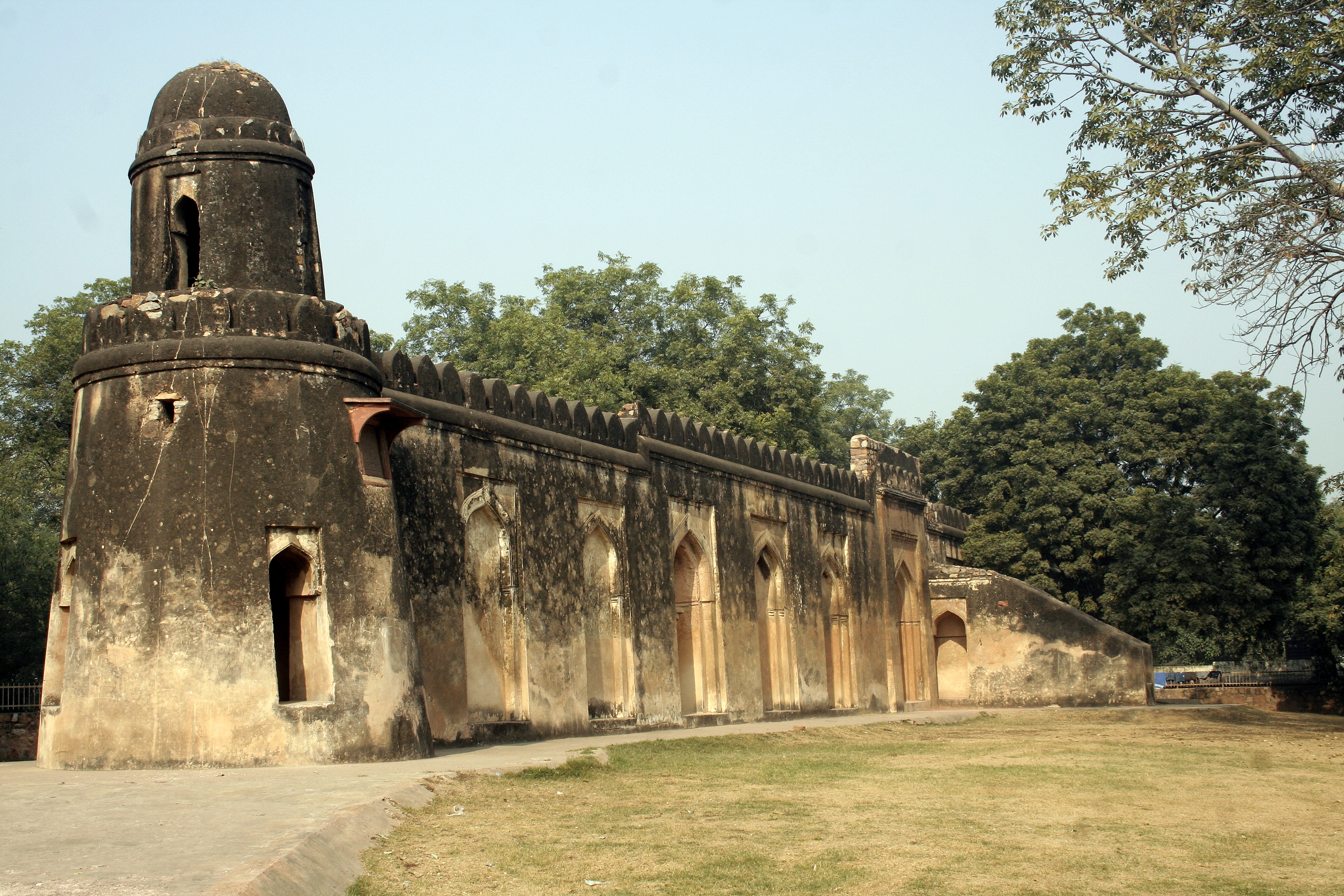
14th-century Idgah, built during Tughlaq dynasty rule in Delhi

Notable Eidgahs around the world include

- Purani Idgah
- Hubli Idgah Maidan
- Id Gah Mosque
- Id Kah Mosque, Kashgar, Xinjiang, China
- Sholakia Eidgah
- Dhanmondi Shahi Eidgah
- Sylhet Shahi Eidgah
- Kheri Eidgah
- Sholakiya Eidgah Maidan, Kishoreganj
- Gor-E-Shahid Eidgah, Dinajpur

=== Shahi Eidgah ===
When the Mughal Emperor Aurangzeb Alamgir ascended the throne in the year 1658, he decided to build a big Eidgah, on the outskirts of then Shahjahanabad now known as the walled city. Shahi Eidgah was built on an area of 31,484 square yards (26,325 m^{2}) of land, surrounded by thousands of square yards of open grounds. The Shahi Eidgah complex has 283,257 sq ft (26,315.4 m^{2}), which at any time can be used by 50,000 namazi. The main gate at the front side has also two small gates besides it for the entrance and exit of the devotees. The same pattern is followed on the north and south sides of the Shahi Eidgah.

=== Moradabad Eidgah ===
The Moradabad Eidgah, located near by Moradabad railway station. The prayer ground is very large, with a seating capacity of 20,000 attendees. It is a historical religious place for Muslims, thus local Moradabad Muslims perform Eid Namaz every year in this Eidgah.

=== Gor-E-Shahid Eidgah Maidan ===
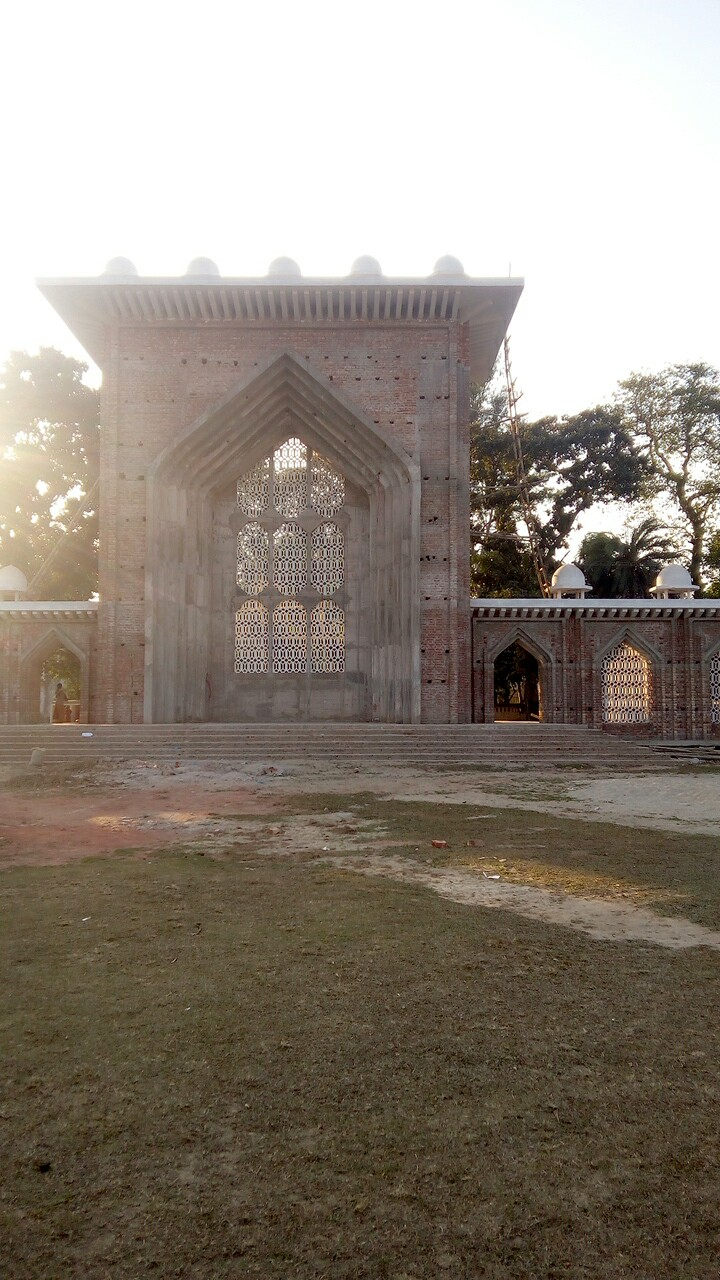
Gor-e-Shahid Eidgah in Dinajpur, Bangladesh.

Gor-E-Shahid Eidgah Maidan (Bengali: গোর-এ-শহীদ ঈদগাহ ময়দান) is located in Dinajpur. Sholakia is declared as the largest Eidgah in Bangladesh. But in Eid ul Adha of 2017 this Eidgah hosted the largest jamaat of Bangladesh. The number of devotees increased this year following the construction of a 516-foot wide minaret with 52 domes. Eidgah Minar's main dome (Mehrab) is about 47 feet (14 m) high and 516 feet (157 m) wide. It has been built in 32 arches. Electric lamps have been connected to each dome of the Eidgah Minar. Eidgah Minar's beauty can be seen from many distances. The largest Eidgah Minar was constructed entirely with ceramic. The road is made for the devotees on both sides of the field. There will be adjacent arrangements. The Eidgah Minar is full of beauty when looked at from a distance. According to the district administration, the Eidgah has an area of about 22 acres (8.9 ha). On the other hand, Sholakia's field is known to be 7 acres of land. In 2019, the 5thEid-ul-Fitr congregation was at Gor-e-Shahid Baro Maidan at 8:45am with the participation of 600,000 devotees. Apart from members of other law enforcement agencies, over 500 policemen were deployed in and around the Eidgah to ensure security. The 6th Eid-ul-Azha largest Eid congregation was at Gor-e-Shahid Baro Maidan, Dinajpur at 8:30am with the participation of around 4 lakh devotees.

== Eidgah Sharif ==
Eidgah Sharif is a Sunni Sufi shrine located in Rawalpindi, Pakistan. The shrine was founded over a century ago. It welcomes visitors from all over the world and frequently hosts ceremonies known as Milaad Paaks which are mainly series of sermons from scholars and religious materials presented in solo a capella by people called "reciters". At the largest of these gatherings (such as the Urs Paak), more than a million visitors crowd the main grounds and the surrounding streets. About four million followers from all over the country and about 500,000 more from the United Kingdom are regular visitors to the shrine. The custodian of Eidgah Sharif, Shaykh Hafiz Muhammad Naqib-Ur Rehman, known to his followers as "Pir Sa’ab", advances the mission and teachings of Eidgah Shareef with the assistance of his son Sahibzada Muhammad Hassan Haseeb Ur Rehman, known to the devotees as "Sa’ab Ji". Pir Sa’ab's ancestors, the previous custodians of the shrine, were all said to be Sufi masters directly from the lineage of Mughal Emperor Babur. In 1960 the family gifted the government with a large proportion of the land used to build Pakistan's capital city of Islamabad, not far from Rawalpindi.

- Eid al-Fitr
- Eid al-Adha
