= Eid prayers =

Special prayers for Islamic holidays

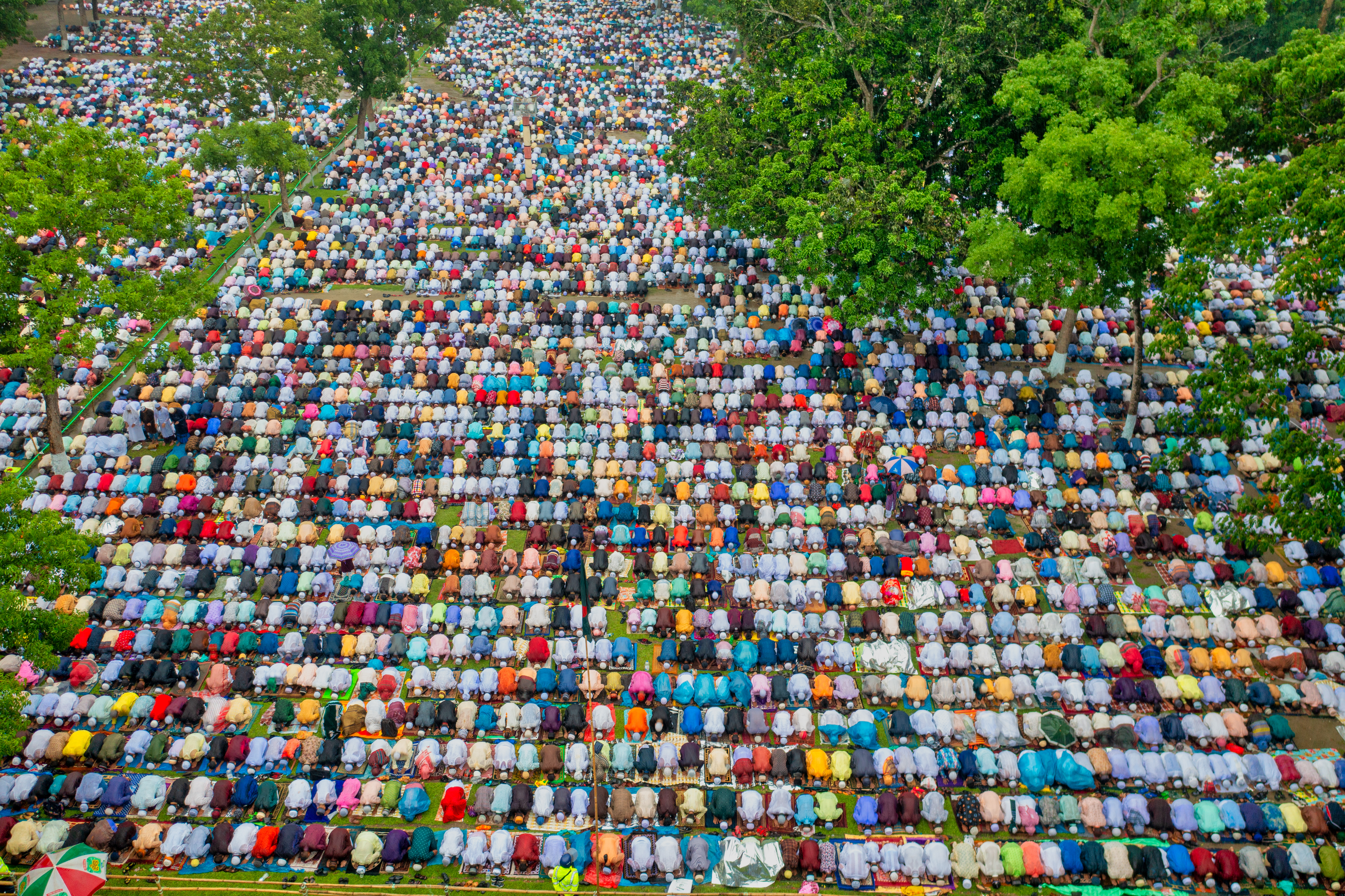
- Eid prayer at Sholakia Eidgah in Bangladesh
- Official name: صلاة العيد
- Also called: Holidays prayer
- Observed by: Muslims
- Type: Islamic
- Significance: A Muslim prayer offered to Allah yearly in Eids.
- Begins: Duha
- Ends: Zenith - Noon
- Date: Cycles according to the Islamic lunar calendar
- Frequency: Yearly
- Related to: Salah, Friday Prayer, Eid al-Fitr, Eid al-Adha

Eid prayers, also referred to as Salat al-Eid (Arabic: صلاة العيد), are holy holiday prayers in the Islamic tradition. The literal translation of the word "Eid" in Arabic is "festival" or "feast" and is a time when Muslims congregate with family and the larger Muslim community to celebrate.

There are generally two central Eids that take place in accordance with the Islamic lunar calendar (hence the additional name Ṣalāt al-’Īdayn (Arabic: صلاة العيدين "Prayer of the Two Eids"):

- Eid al-Fitr (Arabic: عيد الفطر), also known as the "Smaller Eid", is a three-day celebration marking the end of Ramadan, the Islamic holy month of fasting, and welcoming the new month of Shawwal. Mandatory charity, or Zakat, specifically Zakat al-Fitr (Zakat of Eid Al-Fitr) is offered to the poor by every financially-able Muslim (preferably prior to the offering of the prayer) to ensure that those who are less fortunate may also participate in the joyous holiday.
- Eid al-Adha (Arabic: عيد الأضحى), the "Greater Eid" or "Eid of Sacrifice", is celebrated on the 10th day of Dhu al-Hijjah (last month of the Islamic lunar calendar in which the Islamic pillar of Hajj pilgrimage to Mecca is performed). This Eid follows what is considered to be the holiest day in Islam, Day of Arafah and serves as a commemoration of Ibrahim's obedience and faith when tested by Allah. Able Muslims sacrifice an animal (Qurbani) whose provisions are to be distributed among friends, family, and the poor, in three equal parts as charity. Those who are unable to offer Qurbani but meet the requirements for it may offer a donation of Zakat in its place. These obligations apply to every adult Muslim regardless of gender, so long as they meet the requirements of giving. Its duration is 4 days.

There is no set date for the Eid holidays, as it changes from year to year. This is due to the nature of the lunar calendar that calculates months based on the phases of the moon, unlike the solar Gregorian calendar that is used most widely today. The lunar calendar is about 11 days shorter than that of the Gregorian, and so the equivalent date shifts back about 11 days every year. This is true for other holidays, such as the Chinese New Year or Rosh Hashanah, that are also based on the lunar calendar. The date normally varies in locations across the world, but many communities choose to follow the sighting reports of the crescent moon in Mecca for the sake of consistency.

== Name variations ==
Region/country	Language	Main	Romanised
Arab World	Arabic	صلاة العيد	Ṣalāh al-'Īd
Greater Albania	Albanian	Namazi i Bajramit	
Avaristan	Avar	ГІидалъул как	GÍidal"ul kak
Greater Persia	Persian, Dari, Tajik	نماز عيد, Намози ид	Namâz-i 'Īd
Russia, Pakistan, India Maldives	Hindustani, Punjabi, Russian, Sindhi, Dhivehi	عيد نماز, ईद नमाज़, Ид намаз, ޢީދު ނަމާދު	Īd namāz
China	Chinese	會禮	Huì lǐ
Turkey, Azerbaijan	Turkish, Azeri	Bayram namazı	
Balkans	Serbo-Croatian, Bosnian	Bajram-namaz	
Bashkortostan	Bashkir	Байрам намаҙҙары	Bayram namaz̦z̦ary
Tatarstan	Tatar	Бәйрәм намазы	Bəyrəm namazı
Kazakhstan	Kazakh	Айт намазы	Ayt namazı
Laksky, Kulinsky	Lak	Байрам-чак	Bayram-chak
Bengal	Bengali	ঈদের নামাজ	Īdēr nāmāj
Sweden	Swedish	Eidbön	
Indonesia	Indonesian, Javanese	Salat Id	
Malaysia	Bahasa Melayu	Solat Sunat Hari Raya	
Kurdistan	Kurdish	نوێژی جێژن	
Pashtunistan	Pashto	د اختر لمونځ	
Tamil Nadu	Tamil	பெருநாள் தொழுகை	Pērunal thōzhugai
Zazaistan	Zazaki	Nemacê roşani	

== Eid greetings ==
The customary greeting on the days of Eid Festivals is "Eid Mubarak", meaning "Have a Blessed Eid" and is often accompanied by other forms of cultural greetings and customs.

== Location and timing ==
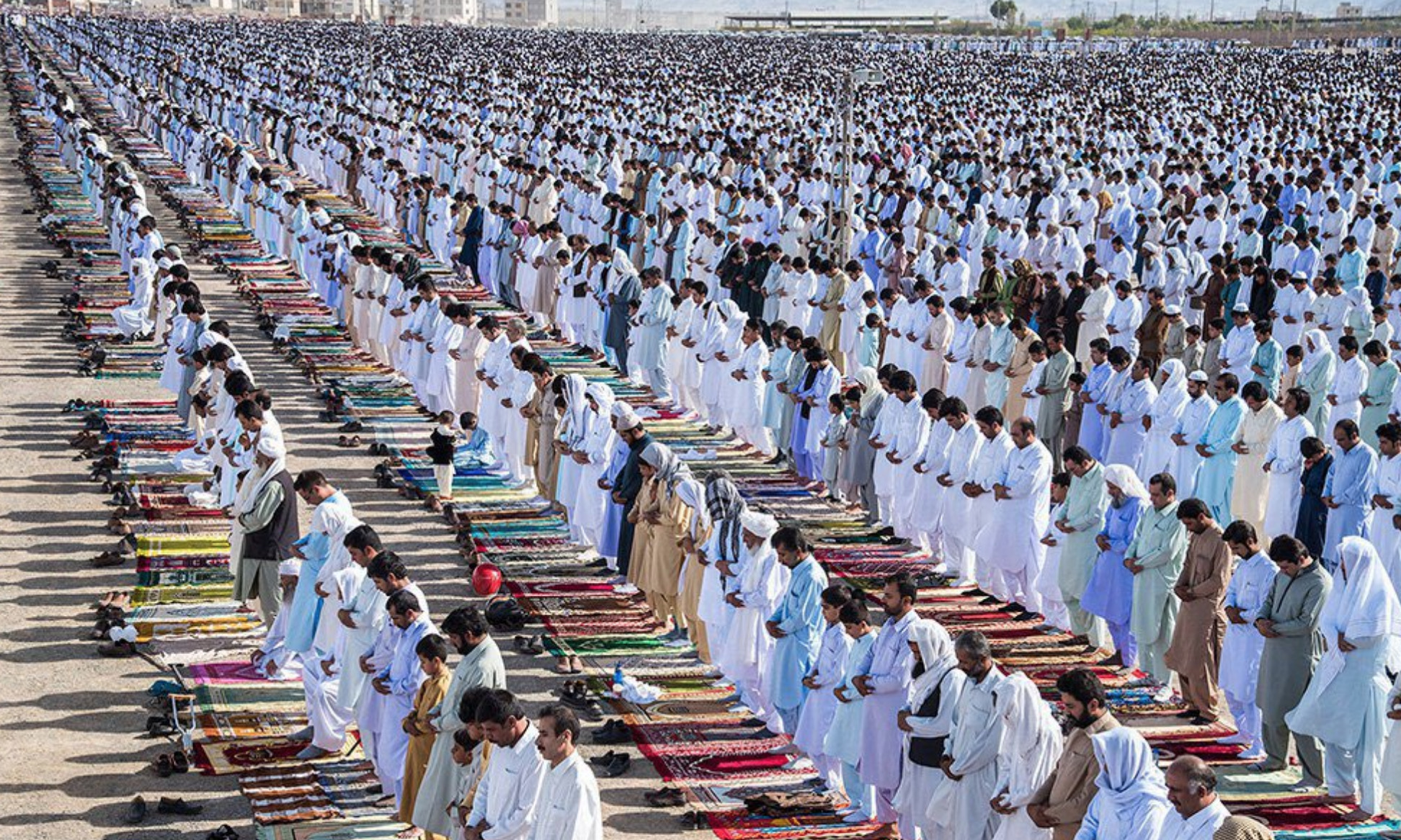
Eid al-fitr prayer in Zahedan, Iran.

Eid prayers are traditionally offered in an open space (such as a Musalla or Eidgah) or field available for prayer if weather permits. The technical appointed time of Salat Al-Eid, as specified by the Quran and Sunnah (sayings, teachings, and actions of Muhammad), begins when the sun reaches approximately three meters above the horizon - above the height of a spear, until it reaches its meridian - approaching its zenith. Generally speaking, it is recommended that the prayer is offered in the morning, anytime after sunrise and before noon.

The time for Eid al-Fitr prayer may be delayed while the prayer of Eid al-Adha is hastened. This is to ensure enough time to facilitate the distribution of the Zakat before the prayer or offer sacrifice after, respectively. This has been a proved Sunnah and has been well recorded in Hadith books.

Specified times of the prayer vary according to local mosques and larger communities may offer two prayers to allow as many people as possible the chance to make the prayer.

== Degree of importance ==
The degree of importance of the Eid prayer vary between different Madhhab, or schools of Islamic thought. According to Hanafi scholars, Salat al-Eid is Wajib (obligatory). To Hanbali jurisprudence, it is Fard (necessary; often synonymous with Wajib) and according to Maliki and Shafiʽi schools, it is considered to be Sunnah Al-Mu'akkadah ("confirmed Sunnah, "continuously performed and never abandoned") but not mandatory.

== Procedure and ritual ==
In addition to the actual praying of the Salah, another component of the Eid Prayers is the delivering of a Khutbah or Islamic sermon, like that given weekly on Fridays at Jumu'ah (obligatory Friday prayers). While the sermon is delivered prior to the Salah for Jumu'ah, it is delivered after the Salah for Eid. This is in accordance with the narration by Abdullah ibn Umar that Muhammad performed Eid Prayers in this order.

The Eid prayers also take place without the customary calling of the Adhan or Iqama (arabic call to prayer), which is normally called before every Salah. This is per the traditional narration by Jabir sin Samurah, who had prayed Eid Salah behind Muhammad, and noted that the calls were not made.

Another specific characteristic of the Eid prayer is the number of Takbir, or calling of the phrase "Allahu Akbar" ("God is Great") performed in each Rakat (unit of prayer) of Salah. The Takbir for regular Salah (as well as most sunnah and special Salah) is called only once at the start with repetitions between steps of the prayer. According to Hadith narrated by 'Amr bin Shuaib over certified generations, Muhammad completed 7 takbirs in the first rakah of the Eid prayer and 5 in the second, then began with the recitation of the Quran. The Hanafis complete 3 takbirs before reciting Quran in the first rak'ah and 3 takbirs after reciting Quran before prostrating.

== Additional sunnah ==
To reap further rewards from praying the Eid, there are additional recommended steps that Muhammad did in his time according to his Sunnah that Muslims may perform. These include bathing or Ghusl prior to attending the festival, dressing in one's best clothes, eating before the Eid al-Fitr prayer and waiting until after Eid al-Adha prayer to eat, saying the Takbir to and from the place of Eid and after every prayer for the remaining days of the festival, as well as taking an alternative route home from the one taken to the prayer.

== Women and the Eid Salah ==
Eid festivals are meant to be an event for all members of the Muslim community, including women and children. According to the Hadith narrated by the Nusaybah Bint Al-Harith (Umm 'Atiyah), women, young and old, were called to come out and participate in the joy of Eid and reap its blessings.

== See also ==
- Salah
- Eidgah
- Eid al-Fitr
- Eid al-Adha
- Rakat
- Islam
- Islamic holidays
- Islamic calendar
- Sunnah and Hadith
