= Nafl prayer =

Optional Islamic prayers

A nafl prayer (Arabic: صلاة النفل, romanized: ṣalāt al-nafl, pl. nawafil) is an optional act of worship, performed by Muslims, often alongside their obligatory prayers. These prayers are believed to give additional spiritual benefits to the individual performing them.

According to the following tradition (hadith), performing nafl prayers help one to draw closer to Allah and attain success in the afterlife:

Rabi'ah ibn Malik al-Aslami narrated that the Prophet said: "Ask."

Rabi'ah said: "I ask of you to be your companion in Paradise."

The Prophet said: "Or anything else?"

Rabi'ah said: "That is it."

The Prophet said: "Then help me by making many prostrations (i.e., nafl prayers)."

== Types ==
There are several times when nafl prayers are performed alongside the compulsory prayers. These can house:

- Two rak'as (prayer units) of nafl prayers at the end of the Maghrib prayer (after sunset).
- Two rak'as of nafl prayers at the end of the early evening Isha prayer.
  - Two rak'as of nafl prayers after the Witr prayer (offered after Isha).
- Two rak'as of nafl prayers at the end of the early afternoon Zuhr prayer.

Nafl prayers can also be performed on their own for various purposes:

- Up to eight rak'as of nafl prayers for the optional late night Tahajjud prayer.
- Up to four rak'as of nafl prayers for the optional mid-morning Ishraq/Duha prayer.
- Two rak'as for the Tahiyat (greeting prayer), shortly after entering a mosque.

== Tahiyyat al Wudu ==
Tahiyyat al-wudu (lit., "greeting the ablution") is a nafl prayer which is performed after completing ablution (wudu). It is a minimum of two cycles.

== See also ==
- Sunnah prayer
- Ghufayla Prayer
- Friday prayer
