= Gor-E-Shahid Eidgah Maidan =

Largest Eid Ground in Bangladesh

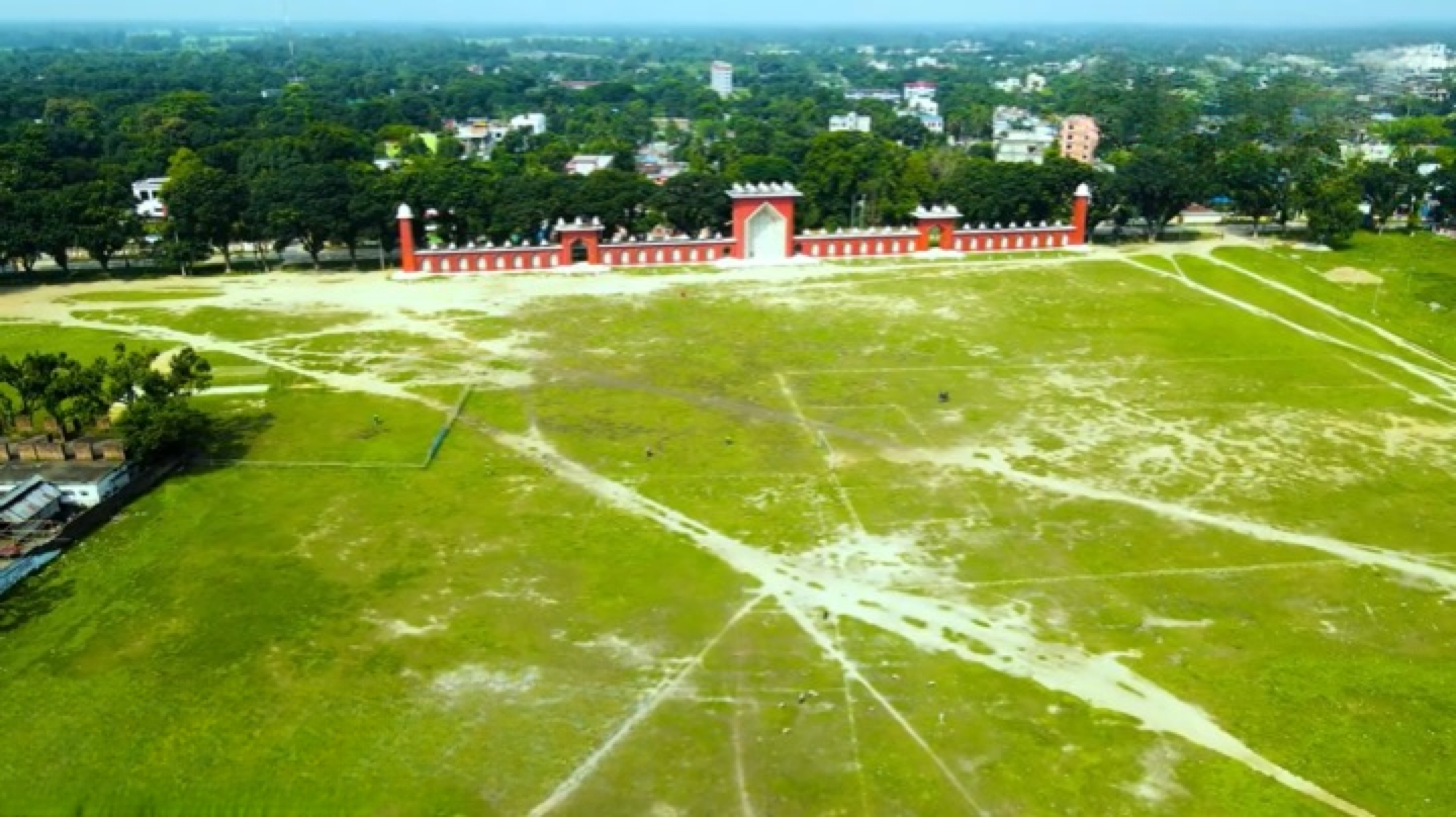
- Gor-E-Shahid Eidgah Maidan

- Location in Bangladesh

Religion
- Affiliation: Islam
- District: Dinajpur District
- Region: Rangpur Division
- Festivals: Eid al-Fitr & Eid al-Adha
- Ownership: Bangladesh Government

Location
- Location: Dinajpur City, Rangpur Division, Bangladesh
- Country: Bangladesh
- Interactive map of Gor-E-Shahid Eidgah Maidan
- Coordinates: Division 25°37′18″N 88°37′54″E

Architecture
- Type: Mosque & Eidgah

Specifications
- Minaret height: 47 feet (14 m)
- Site area: 22 acres (89,000 m^{2})

Gor-E-Shahid Eidgah Maidan (Bengali: গোর-এ-শহীদ ঈদগাহ ময়দান) is a Eidgah located in Dinajpur city in the division of Rangpur, Bangladesh. It is the largest eidgah in South Asia & the largest in Bangladesh. The number of devotees increased following the construction of a 516-foot (157 m) wide minaret with 52 domes.

== History ==
In 2017, during Eid ul Adha, this Eidgah hosted the largest jamaat in Bangladesh. In 2019, Gor-E-Shahid Baro Maidan hosted the 5th Eid-ul-Fitr congregation at 8:45 am, for 600,000 devotees. Over 500 policemen, in addition to members of other law enforcement agencies, were deployed in and around the Eidgah to ensure security. The 6th Eid-ul-Azha congregation was at Gor-E-Shahid Baro Maidan in 2019, one of the largest Eid congregations in the country, taking place at 8:30 am with the participation of around 4 lakh devotees.

== Architecture ==
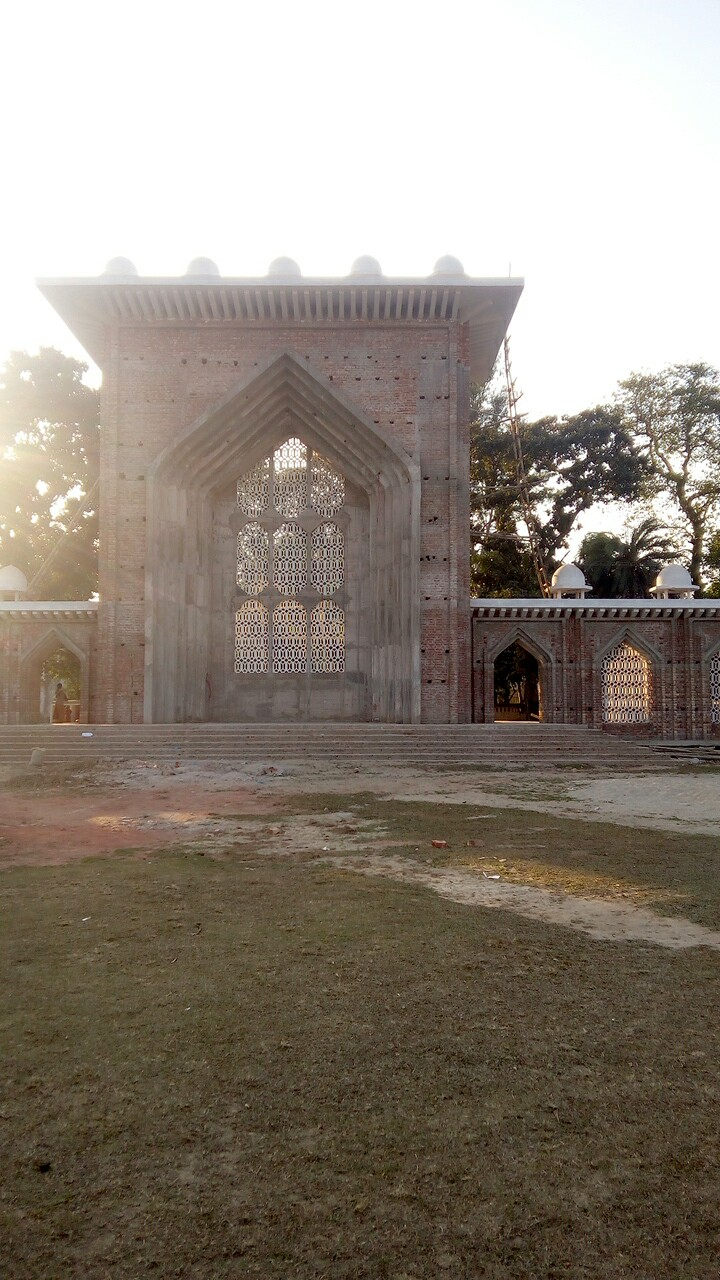

A 516-foot (157 m) wide minaret with 52 domes was constructed at a cost of Tk 38 million. Eidgah Minar's main dome (Mehrab), includes 32 arches and is about 47 feet (14 m) high and 516 feet (157 m) wide. Electric lamps were connected to each dome. The Eidgah Minar was constructed entirely of ceramic.

A road was made for devotees on both sides of the field. According to the district administration, the Eidgah has an area of about 22 acres.
