= Dhanmondi Shahi Eidgah =

Mughal Eidgah
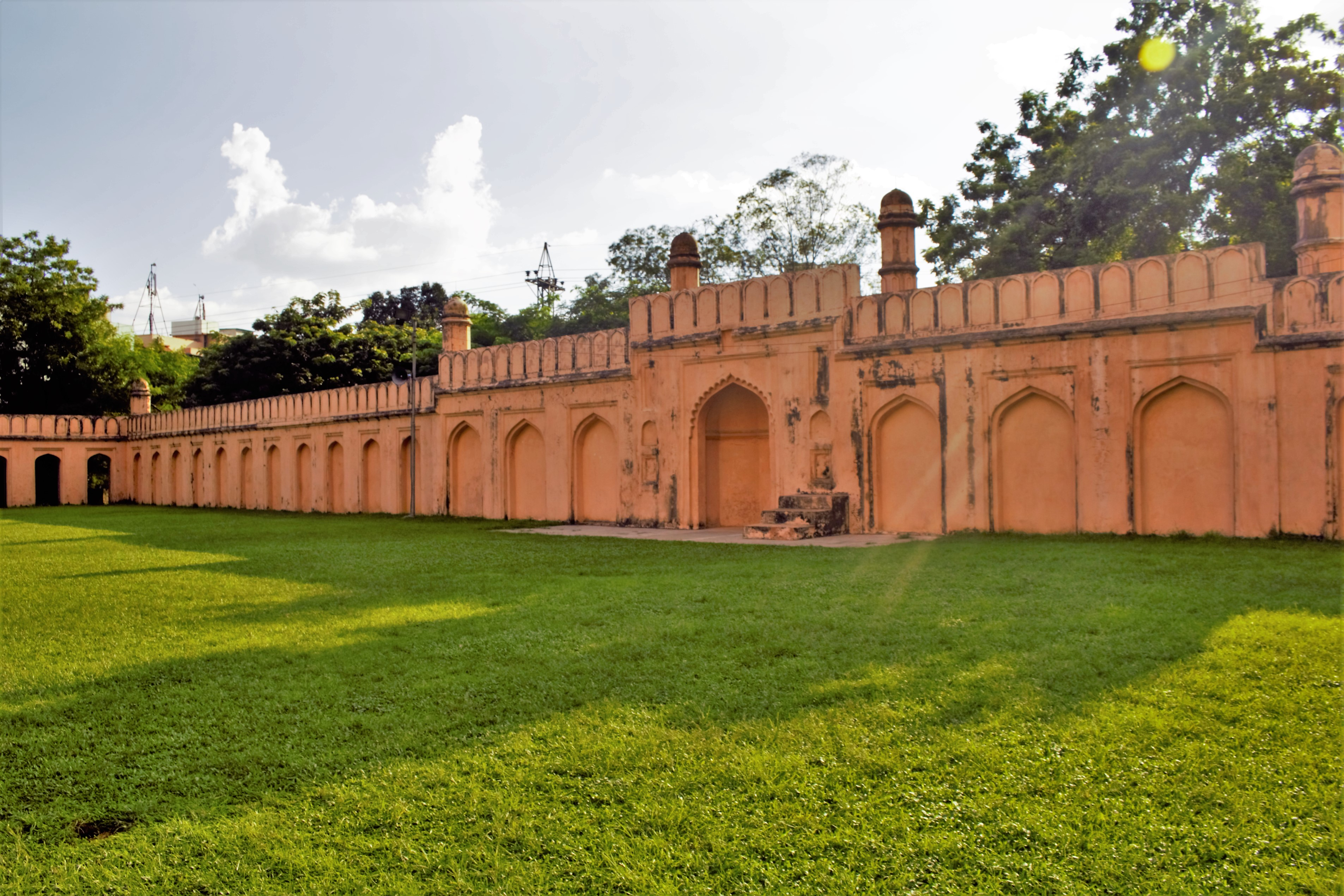
- Mughal Eidgah, Dhanmondi

- Location within Bangladesh

Religion
- Affiliation: Islam

Location
- Location: Dhanmondi, Dhaka, Bangladesh
- Interactive map of Mughal Eidgah
- Coordinates: 23.7433°N 90.3742°E

Architecture
- Style: Mughal architecture
- Established: 1640; 386 years ago

The Dhanmondi Shahi Eidgah (Bengali: ধানমণ্ডী শাহী ঈদগাহ), also known as Mughal Eidgah (Bengali: মোগল ঈদগাহ), is located in Saat Masjid road, in Dhanmondi residential area of Dhaka, Bangladesh. The Eidgah was built in 1640 CE during the Mughal era and has been in use for Eid celebration since then.

The structure is a listed archaeological site of the Department of Archaeology and has historical, architectural and heritage values. It is an example of Mughal architecture. Conservationist architect Abu Sayeed M Ahmed wrote, "This Eidgah is the oldest surviving Mughal monument in Dhaka city. There is no second one with the architectural forms and features similar to it."

== History ==
The Mughal Eidgah is a monumental structure built during the Mughal Empire. the Eidgah was built by Mir Abul Qasim, a Diwan of Shah Shuja and builder of Boro Katra.

The Mughal subahdars and diwans living in this land used to come to the Eidgah for Eid prayers.

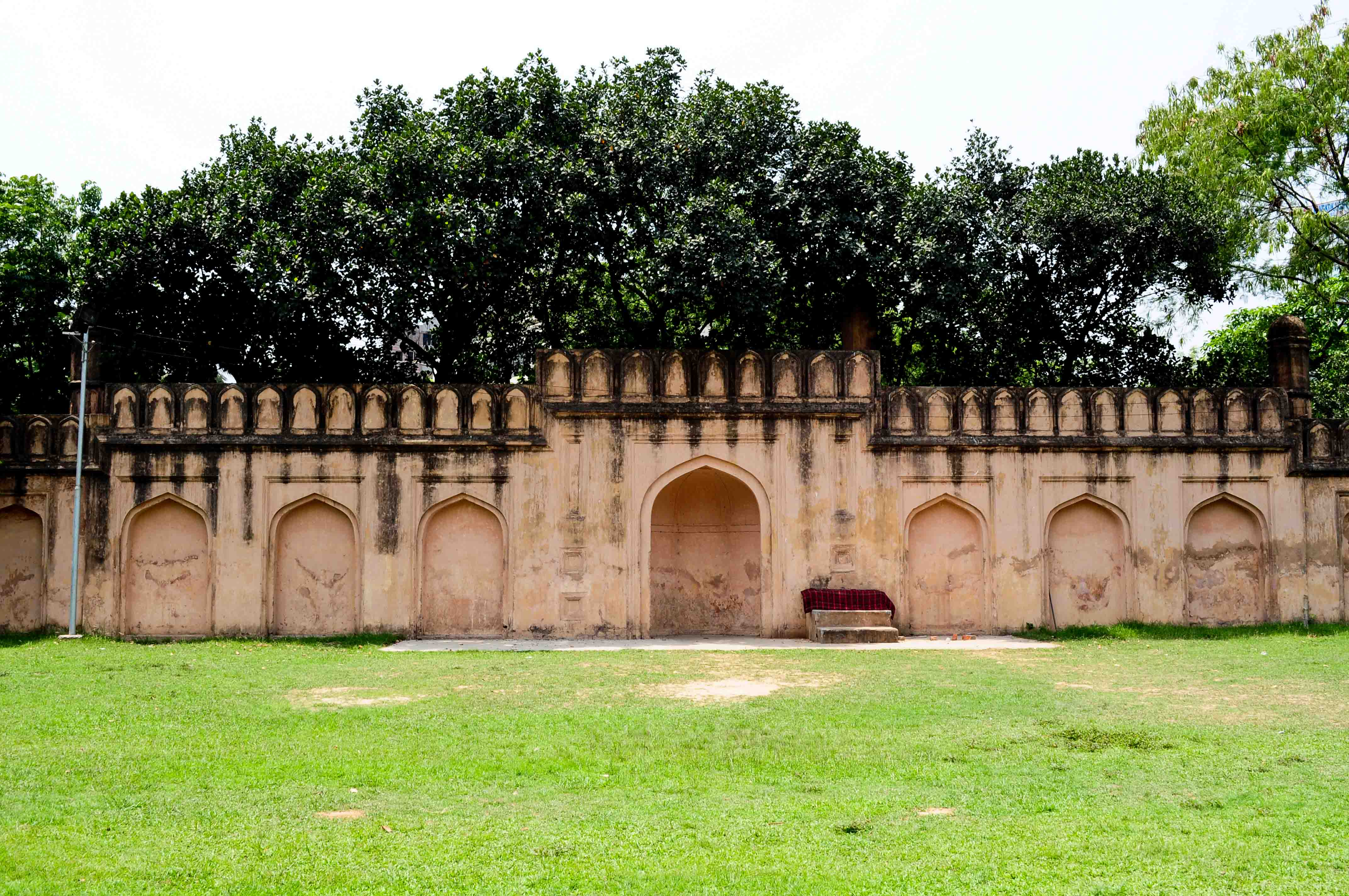
Mihrab (central prayer-niche) that Emams faced during prayers.

== Architectural value ==
The Eidgah for Eid congregating was a platform measuring 148 feet by 137 feet in size raised from the surrounding land by 4–6 feet. It was oblong in plan, with thick brick walls enclosing the courtyard on all side except east. The 15-foot high west wall, the only surviving part of it, has a 5-foot deep four –centred and stilted arched semi-octagonal Mihrab with an inscription on top. It was decorated with multi-cusped arch and flanked by shallow subsidiary niches, three on each side.

The surrounding wall was possibly partly perforated; these had a row of battlement cresting with additional elements decorating the corners, the projected parts of the walls and the diminishing sections on the western wall, like in a fort. Though these had structural reason to be there, but their placement and shapes contributed to the aesthetic too.

During Mughal period, a river branch flowed beside the Eidgah connected the river near Saat Masjid. The Mughal Subehdars and Diwans living in this land used to come to the Eidgah for Eid prayers. People still gather at the place for Eid prayer congregation. The Eidgah spreads over around 3.5 bighas of land.

== Construction threats ==
The oldest surviving Mughal-era Eidgah here faces a threat from unplanned construction of a six-storeyed mosque on its premises, a media report said. The Dhanmondi Eidgah mosque committee is constructing the building without approval from Rajdhani Unnayan Kartripakkha (Rajuk) as required by the Building Construction Act and Dhaka Metropolitan Building Rules. Architect Sayeed expressed the fear that the Eidgah structure may have been weakened by the rig vibration during construction of the new building. He also said, "It is a very bad choice of site for construction of a huge building, as it has spoilt the elegant look of the heritage monument."

Dhaka Metropolitan Building Rules of 2008 requires that any development within 250-metre radius of an archaeological and heritage site must have the permission of government's high-powered Nagar Unnayan Committee before approaching the Rajuk Building Committee for plan approval. "We are going to demolish the old mosque to complete the new one," said Atiqul Habib, secretary general of Dhanmondi Eidgah Mosque Committee. The monument has also been overshadowed by a grocery shop that a mosque committee turned into an 'Islamic Research Centre' – within ten feet of Eidgah's central Mihrab (central prayer-niche).

Devotees of Eid-congregation and the aspiring visitors now have to take a detour around the new mosque to get to the Mughal Eidgah.
