= Duha =

Voluntary salah offered at or just after sunrise

- Official name: صلاة الضحى، صلاة الشروق
- Also called: Ishraq prayer, Chasht prayer, Sunrise prayer
- Observed by: Muslims
- Type: Islamic
- Significance: An optional Islamic prayer offered daily in the sunrise hour of the morning.
- Observances: Sunnah prayers
- Begins: 15-20 minutes after sunrise
- Ends: zenith - noon
- Frequency: daily
- Related to: Salah, Nafl prayer, Five Pillars of Islam

The Ḍuḥā prayer (Arabic: صَلَاة الضحى, ṣalāt aḍ-ḍuḥā) is the voluntary Islamic prayer between the obligatory Islamic prayers of Fajr and Dhuhr.

The time for this prayer begins when the sun has risen to the height of a spear, which is fifteen or twenty minutes after sunrise until just before the sun passes its zenith (after which the time for the dhuhr prayer begins). When prayed at the beginning of its time it is called Ishraaq prayer. It is also known in Bengali as Chashter Namaz (চাশতের নামাজ) and in Urdu as Namāz-e-Chāsht (نماز چاشت).

Salat al Duha is done to forgive sins and as a form of charity. Per Abu Dharr, Muhammad had said: "Charity is required from every part of your body daily. Every saying of 'Glory to be to Allah' is a charity. Every saying of 'Praise be to Allah' is charity. Every saying of 'There is no god except Allah' is charity. Every saying of 'Allah is the Greatest' is charity. Ordering the good is charity. Eradicating evil is charity. And what suffices for that (as a charity) are the two raka'at of Duha." This is related by Ahmad, Muslim, and Abu Dawud as well.

It can be prayed either for four raka'at or until 6 raka'at. If one should pray four raka'at, it should be split into two.

Duha prayer has a specific time frame and ends before the Zuhr prayer. Scholars suggest it typically starts at 9:00 AM and finishes around 11:00 AM. In Indonesia, it usually ends at 11:00 AM, coinciding with the start of Zuhr. Shaykh Ibn 'Uthaymin clarifies that Duha ends when the sun begins its westward decline, roughly 5–10 minutes before zawal. It is crucial to avoid performing Duha after this time or during dhohwah (when the sun has risen but is not hot yet).

== See also ==
- Dua
- Nafl prayer
- Salat
- Sunnah prayer
