= Isha (prayer) =

Fifth prayer of the day in Islam

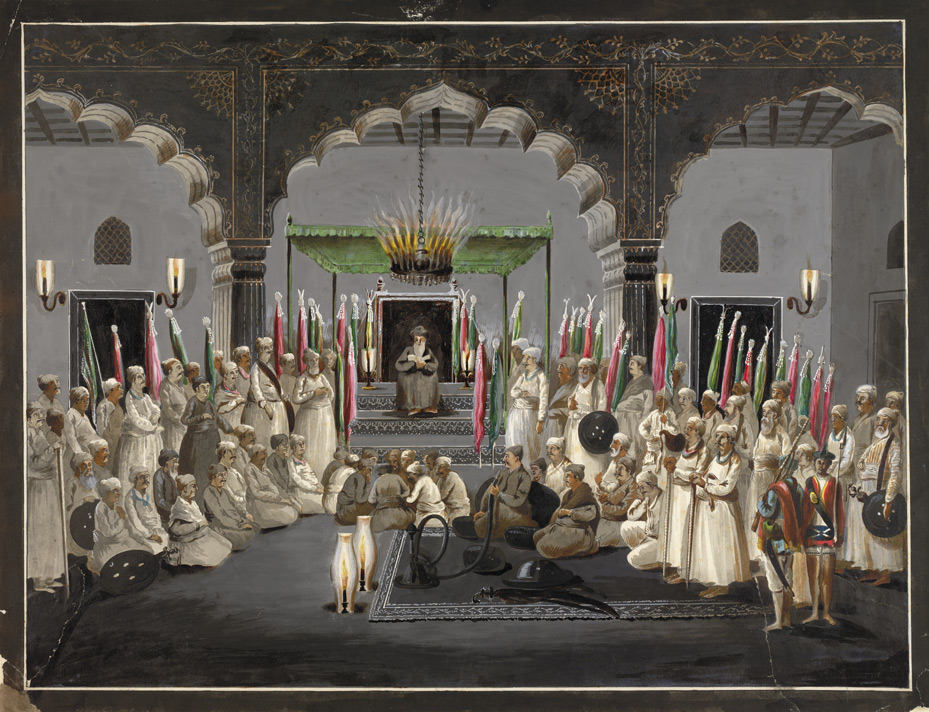
An Imam reads verses from the Quran after Isha' (night prayers) in the Mughal Empire.

Isha (Arabic: صلاة العشاء), alternatively also transliterated as Ishaa', and also known as Khoftan or Khooftaan (from Persian خفتن meaning sleeping), is one of the mandatory five daily Islamic prayers, and contains four cycles.

== Ahadith mentioning virtues ==
Uthman ibn Affan reported that he heard Muhammad saying: "He who observed the 'Isha' prayer in congregation, it was as if he prayed up to midnight, and he who prayed the morning prayer in congregation, it was as if he prayed the whole night." (Muslim)

Abu Hurairah reported: The Messenger of Allah said, "The most burdensome prayers for the hypocrites are the 'Isha' and the Fajr prayers and if they knew what these contain, they would have come to them, even though they had to crawl on their knees." (Bukhari)

== Sunni Muslims ==
The time period within which the Isha prayer must be recited is the following:

- Time begins: According to the Hanafi school, Isha begins when complete darkness has arrived and the white twilight in the sky has disappeared. According to the Maliki, Shafi'i and Hanbali schools, the time begins when the red thread has disappeared from the sky. These times can be approximated by using the sun as a measure. When the sun has descended 12 degrees below the horizon, it is approximately equivalent to the disappearance of the red from the sky. Islamic rationalist are of the opinion that the time of Isha prayer starts after civil dusk, when darkness starts spreading across the sky. Some Islamic scholars are of the opinion that the time of Isha prayer begins at nautical dusk, when the darkness spreads completely and the western horizon can no longer be observed through the naked eye. For approximating when complete darkness begins, some astronomers argue that it occurs when the sun has descended 15 degrees below the horizon while others use the safer measure of 18 degrees.
- Time ends: At the beginning of dawn when the time for Fajr prayer begins. However, it is frowned upon to delay the prayer without a legitimate reason past the first third of the night, and "night" in Islamic law means the time between the end of the Maghrib prayer and the start of the Fajr prayer. According to an opinion in the Maliki school, the prohibition is from delaying the prayer beyond the first half of the night, rather than just the first third.

== Shia Muslims ==
The time period within which the Isha prayer must be recited is the following:

For Shia Muslims:

- Time begins: once Maghrib (evening prayer) has been recited and completed.
- Time ends: at midnight, the midpoint between shafak and dawn.

However, it is very important to recite the prayer as soon as the time begins. Often Maghrib and Isha are offered together with a small gap of time in between.

== See also ==
- Salah (Prayer)
- Wudu (Washing of some body parts to prepare oneself for praying)
- Other salah:
  - Fajr prayer (Morning)
  - Zuhr prayer (Mid-day)
  - Asr prayer (Afternoon)
  - Maghrib prayer (Sunset prayer)
- Dhikr
- Tasbih
