= Al-Qahhar =

One of the names of God in Islam

Al-Qahhar written in Arabic

Al-Qahhar (Arabic: القهار; The Almighty) is one of the names of God in Islam. The meaning has been variously translated as "The Conqueror," "The Vanquisher," or "The Subduer."

== Quran ==
يَوْمَ تُبَدَّلُ الْأَرْضُ غَيْرَ الْأَرْضِ وَالسَّمَاوَاتُ وَبَرَزُوا لِلَّهِ الْوَاحِدِ الْقَهَّار

The day will come, when the earth shall be changed into another earth, and the heavens into other heavens; and men shall come forth from their graves to appear before the only, the mighty God

— Quran 14:48 [ George Sale Translation ]

يَوْمَ هُمْ بَارِزُونَ لَا يَخْفَى عَلَى اللَّهِ مِنْهُمْ شَيْءٌ لِمَنِ الْمُلْكُ الْيَوْمَ لِلَّهِ الْوَاحِدِ الْقَهَّارِ

the Day when they come forth with naught concerning them hidden from God. Whose is the sovereignty this Day? It is God’s, the One, the Paramount.

— Quran 40:16 [ Study Quran Translation ]

== Salafi perspective ==
Upon the Day the earth will be exchanged to other than the earth and the heavens (will be exchanged); and they will go forth to Allah, The One, The Superb Vanquisher. ۝ Verse 48, Chapter 14, The Quran [ Dr. Ghali' Translation ]

The Day they are going forth. Not a thing of theirs is concealed from Allah. "Whose is the Kingdom today?" " (It belongs) to Allah, The One, The Superb Vanquisher." ۝ Verse 16, Chapter 40, The Quran [Dr. Ghali' Translation]

According to the Salafi scholar Abdul-Rahman al-Sa'di, this appellation signifies God's might and that everything that exists is under his subdue as he is the one before whom the entirety of creation has humbled itself. Also, this name evidently shows that God is in control of all his creation. In the Islamic perspective, each creature is subdued by one above it, forming a hierarchical chain that culminates with God as the ultimate Subduer of all that exists. Another important consequence of this divine name in Islam is its strong relation to monotheism since there has to be a singular ultimate subduer to all that exists, and that subduer is God.

The Ultimate Subduer must be one; it is impossible that He has an associate or partner. Rather, subdual and singularity are perpetually conjoined. Thus, ultimate kingship, ability, power, and might exclusively belong to God—the Singular, the Subduer—while everything apart from Him is both created and subdued.

— Ibn Qayyim al-Jawziyya, Thunderbolts Sent On The Jahmiyyah And The Mu'atilah
