= Al-Mu'min =

al-Mu'min may refer to:

- One of the names of God in Islam
- The 40th chapter (sūrah) of the Qur'an, also known as Ghafir
- Abd al-Mu'min, Almohad caliph from 1133 to 1163
- Al-Mu'min, a name given to a minor unnamed figure mentioned in Ghafir
