= Al-Tawwāb =

One of the names of the Islamic God

Al-Tawwāb (ALA-LC romanization of Arabic: التواب) is one of the popular 99 Names of God, by which Muslims regard God. It symbolizes God's attribute of relentless mercy and shows up in multiple places to refer to God in the Qur'ān (11 times), and Sunnah, amongst other places.

== Linguistic translation ==
The word "تواب" is said to come from the root t-w-b which has the following classical Arabic connotations: to return; to return to goodness, to repent; to be restored or to be repeatedly summoned or called. The attribute, At-Tawwāb, is therefore translated as "The Acceptor of Repentance".

== Deeper translation ==
In his book, "Al-Maqsad Al-Asna fi Sharah Asma' Allahu al-Husna" (also known as "The Best Means in Explaining Allah's Beautiful Names"), Imam Al Ghazali translates At-Tawwāb as "The Ever-Relenting, He who constantly turns man to repentance". He states that Al-Tawwāb is "the One Who keeps on facilitating the causes of repentance for His creatures time and time again by showing them some of His signs, by conveying to them some of His Warnings and by revealing to them some of His deterrents and cautions with the Intent that they, having been apprised of the dangers of their sins, might be filled with fear by His frightening them and subsequently turn to repentance. Through (His) accepting (the evidence of their penitence), the Favor of God Most High (once again) reverts to them."

Others, try to explain this Attribute by stating that Allah is the One Who beckons for our return, the One Who forgives those who return to goodness, the One Who restores to grace those who repent and the One Who forgives those who forgive others.

Other attributes of Allah such as Al Haleem, Al Ghaffar, Al Ghaffur and Al-Afuw give the impression that asking forgiveness for one's sin is different from seeking repentance. At-Tawwāb seems to require a necessary step for forgiveness. An individual must make a sincere attempt to repent for a sin and vow not to return to it.

== Occurrence in the Quran ==
The Attribute of At-Tawwāb occurs frequently in the Quran in the various Ayah. For example, it can be found in the verses 2:128, 4:64, 9:104, 49:12, 110:3.

== Concept of Allah's forgiveness ==
When contemplating how Allah deals with an individual's forgiveness, the root definition of each of these words help a great deal. In general, an individual has sins that he is aware of and sins that he is not aware of. Al Haleem has been explained to mean that Allah is forbearing and clement, where He gives an individual respite, or time to ask Him for forgiveness. Allah is not in haste to punish an individual for his sins. He even at times overlooks sins due to His attribute of Haleem. Al Ghaffur has been described as meaning Allah is "The Most Forgiving One". He forgives a particular sin, no matter how large it may be. If the person returns to the same sin, Allah is Al Ghaffar, The Very Forgiving One. Al Ghaffar gives the notion that Allah continuously and repetitively forgives an individual for his sins. On the other hand, the process of creation of opportunities for one to recognize his/her mistakes and return to the All Forgiving God with sufficient humbleness that it warrants forgiveness emanates from His Attribute of Al-Tawwab (who is essentially the Facilitator and Acceptor of repentance). Once Allah accepts the repentance of an individual through His infinite mercy, He can erase the sin altogether because of His attribute Affuw, and it is then as though there was no sin at all. Since man is not perfect, he repetitively sins and asks for forgiveness and seeks repentance, so the cycle of forgiveness can repeat from Allah.

== See also ==
- Al-Shakūr
