= Q110 =

Q110 may refer to:

- Quran 110,
- Q110, New York bus route
