= Funeral prayer (Islam) =

Islamic prayer in congregation during a funeral

Salat al-Janazah
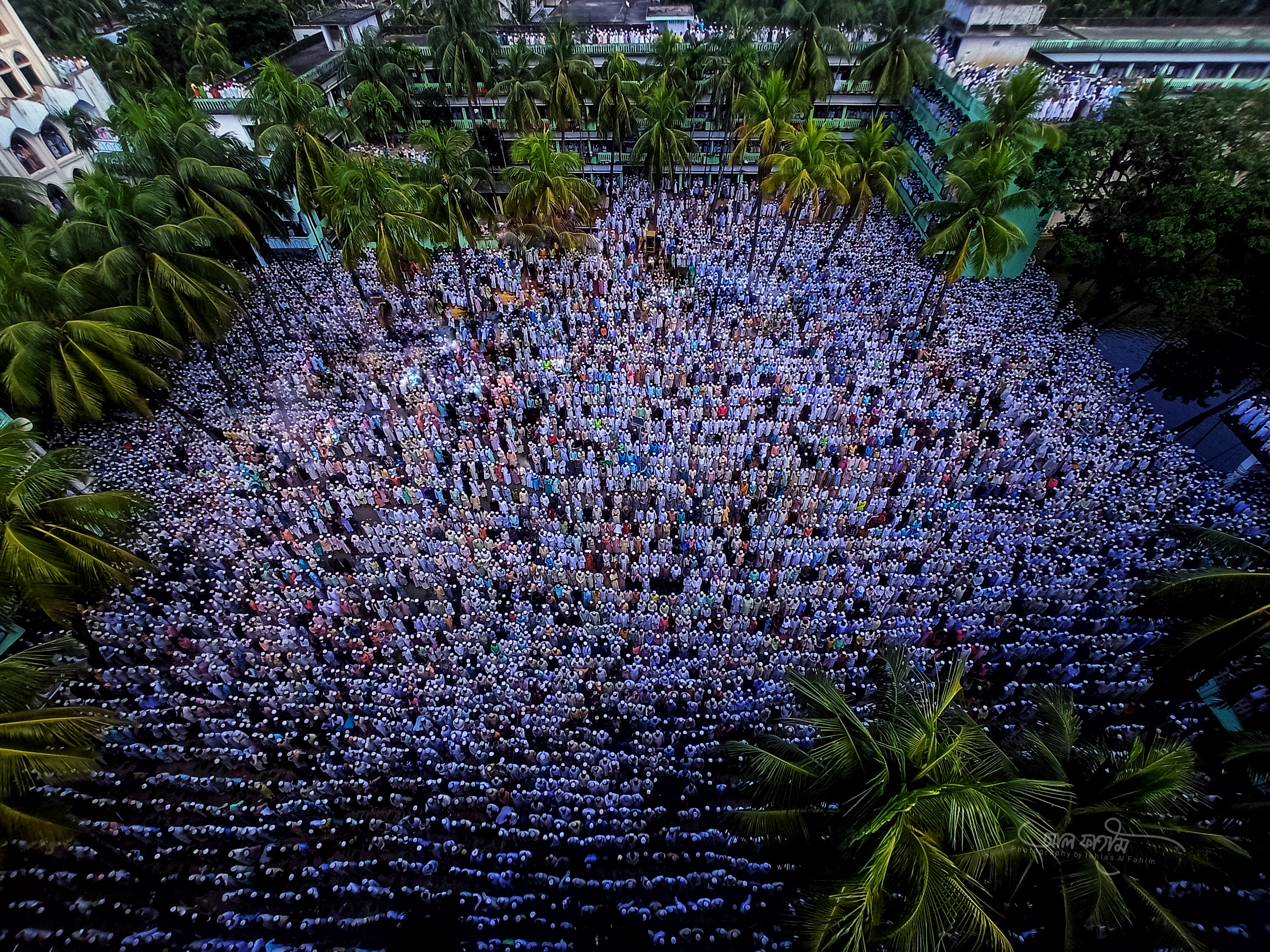
- Salat al-Janazah of Shah Ahmad Shafi in Bangladesh (2020)
- Official name: صلاة الجنازة
- Also called: Funeral prayer
- Observed by: Muslims
- Type: Islamic
- Significance: An Islamic funeral prayer performed for a deceased Muslim
- Observances: Supplications for the deceased and all dead Muslims
- Frequency: Occasionally
- First time: 7th-century
- Started by: Islamic Prophet Muhammad
- Related to: Salah, Islamic funeral, Fard Kifayyah

Ṣalāt al-Janāzah (Arabic: صلاة الجنازة) is the Islamic funeral prayer performed for a deceased Muslim. It is performed in congregation to seek pardon for the deceased and all dead Muslims, and is a communal obligation (farḍ al-kifāya) upon all able Muslims; meaning if some Muslims take the responsibility of conducting the prayer, then the obligation is fulfilled, but if this obligation is not fulfilled by anyone, all Muslims will be accountable.

== History and origin ==
The funeral prayer (Salat al-Janazah) developed as a distinct ritual during the lifetime of the Prophet Muhammad and the early Muslim community in Medina. The earliest accounts of this prayer describe it as a simple act of supplication and remembrance for the deceased, differing markedly from many pre-Islamic funeral practice, which were often accompanied by wailing and lamentations. The practice was established to offer a final act of honour and intercessionon behalf of a deceased Muslim before burial. It remains a central part of Islamic funeral process, symbolizing the community's collective support and prayer for the deceased's forgiveness.

== Description ==
After washing the body thoroughly (ghusl) and shrouding it, the congregation is arranged in rows, often in odd numbers, with an imam positioned at the front facing the qibla. The body of the deceased is placed before the imam, and in cases involving multiple bodies, they are arranged in sequence. The prayer is most commonly performed in an open area, although it may also be conducted inside a mosque. Unlike the five daily prayers, the funeral prayer does not include bowing (ruku) or prostration (sujud).

=== Procedure ===
The structure of the Salat al Janazah differs from region to region, but classical sources describe a generally consistent form. It is performed while standing and usually consists of:

1. First takbir: Recitation of al Fatiha is prescribed in most traditions, though Hanafi practice substitutes the thana (an introductory supplication).
2. Second takbir: Invoking Salutations (Salawat) upon Muhammad and his family.
3. Third takbir: Supplications are made for the deceased and for all deceased Muslims, asking for forgiveness, divine mercy, and elevation of rank in the Hereafter.
4. Fourth takbir: The prayer is concluded with the final salutation (taslim).

Following the completion of the funeral prayer, the body is taken to the place of burial, where it is laid to rest according to Islamic rites.

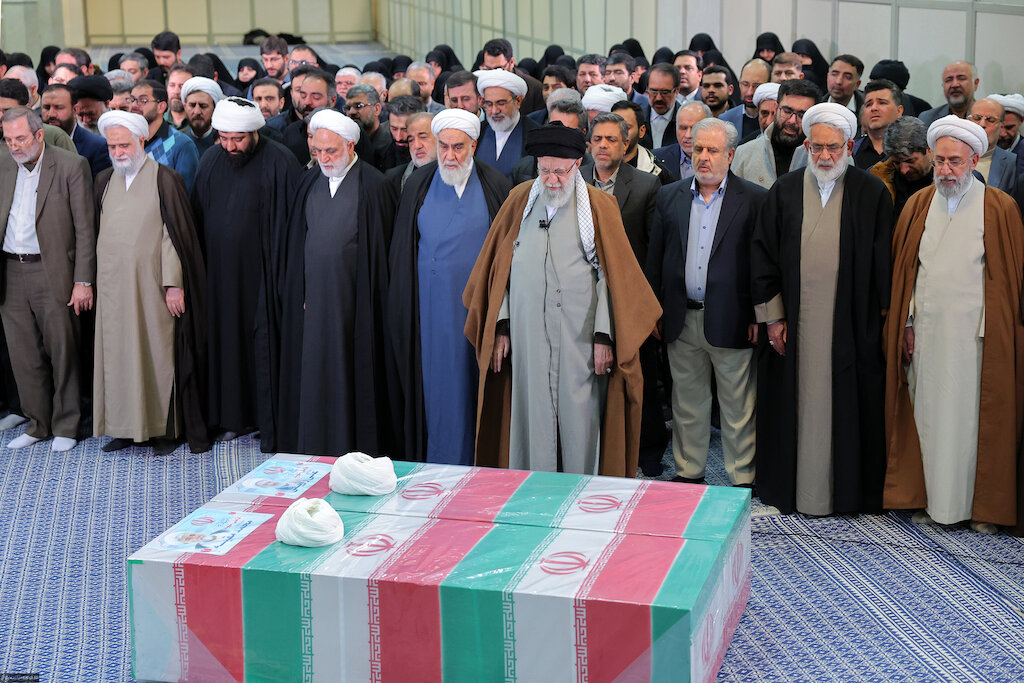
The funeral prayer led by Ali Khamenei, then-Supreme Leader of Iran.

== Funeral prayer in absentia (Salat al-Gha'ib) ==
Salat al ghaib is a funeral prayer performed for a Muslim who has died far away from those offering the prayer (i.e., when the body is not present). The practice is based on a story of the Muhammad praying for Najashi, the king of Abyssinia. This event is documented in well-known Islamic texts.

=== Jurisprudential differences ===
Jurisprudentially, Sunni scholars have different views. The Shafi'i and Hanbali schools of thought usually allow for this prayer. However, the Hanafi and Maliki traditions often consider the Prophet's action to be a special case, or they limit the situations in which the prayer is appropriate. Contemporary fatwas and summaries of Fiqh still show these same differences and provide specific conditions for when the absentee prayer is recommended or allowed.

Shia jurisprudence generally does not permit the absentee funeral prayer, regarding the Prophet's prayer for the Negus as an exceptional case rather than a normative practice.

== Exceptions ==
According to an authentic hadith, Muhammad did not perform funeral prayer of a person who committed suicide;

Jabir b. Samura reported: [The dead body] of a person who had killed himself with a broad-headed arrow was brought before the Apostle of Allah, but he did not offer prayers for him. Another exception is for one who hasn't paid off debts until someone paid them on the deceased person's behalf.

— Sahih Muslim, 004:2133
