= Istighfar =

Islamic act of worship

Istighfar (Arabic: ٱسْتِغْفَار, romanized: istighfār) is the act of seeking forgiveness of Allah in Islam. This is usually done by saying "I seek the forgiveness of Allah" (Arabic: أَسْتَغْفِرُ ٱللَّٰهَ, romanized: astaghfiru llāha), or "I seek the forgiveness of Allah, my Lord, and turn to him (in repentance)" (Arabic: أَسْتَغْفِرُ ٱللَّٰهَ رَبِّي وَأَتُوبُ إِلَيْهِ, romanized: astaghfiru llāha rabbī wa-atūbu ilayhi).

It is considered one of the essential parts of worship in Islam.

== Meaning ==
Istighfar (Arabic: ٱسْتِغْفَار) is the act of seeking forgiveness from Allah for one's sins, shortcomings, and mistakes. It is a fundamental concept in Islam, emphasizing repentance, humility, and the mercy of Allah- seeking forgiveness directly from God alone without partners.

Astaghfirullah literally translates to "I seek forgiveness in God."

== Purpose ==
Islam teaches that human beings were created by Allah with free will, enabling them to choose between righteousness and sin [Quran 76:3]. Despite this capacity for moral choice, humans are inherently prone to error due to their weak nature (Quran 4:28). To address this, Allah in His mercy has prescribed istighfar (seeking forgiveness) as a means for believers to repent and purify themselves after committing sins, whether intentionally or unintentionally.

Islamically, the Quran states: "Say, "O My servants who have transgressed against themselves [by sinning], do not despair of the mercy of Allāh. Indeed, Allāh forgives all sins. Indeed, it is He who is the Forgiving, the Merciful." "

== In the Qur'an ==
Istighfar, and some other words from the same root such as Ghafir, Al-Ghafoor, Ghaffar, occur in the Qur'an more than seventy times.

== Quranic verses regarding istighfar ==
In the Qur'an, there are numerous verses on the issue of istighfar, in which Allah commands the believers to always ask for forgiveness and turn to Him. Some examples of these verses are:

- "And those who, when they commit an immorality or wrong themselves [by transgression], remember Allah and seek forgiveness for their sins – and who can forgive sins except Allah? – and [who] do not persist in what they have done while they know." (Al Quran 3:135)
- "Those – their reward is forgiveness from their Lord and gardens beneath which rivers flow [in Paradise], wherein they will abide eternally; and excellent is the reward of the [righteous] workers." (Al Quran 3:136)
- "Whoever commits evil or wrongs themselves then seeks Allah's forgiveness will certainly find Allah All-Forgiving, Most Merciful." (Al Quran 4:110)
- "So will they not repent to Allah and seek His forgiveness? And Allah is Forgiving and Merciful." (Al Quran 5:74)
- "And seek your Lord's forgiveness and turn to Him in repentance. He will grant you a good provision for an appointed term and graciously reward the doers of good. But if you turn away, then I truly fear for you the torment of a formidable Day." (Al Quran 11:3)
- "And return to your Lord time after time and submit to Him before there comes to you the punishment, then you shall not be helped." (Al Quran 39:54)
- In Surah Nooh ( Al Quran 71 :10 ) Allah Says فَقُلۡتُ اسۡتَغۡفِرُوۡا رَبَّكُمۡؕ اِنَّهٗ كَانَ غَفَّارًا ( Saying, 'Ask forgiveness from your Lord; for He is Oft-Forgiving, in the next verse Allah said يُّرۡسِلِ السَّمَآءَ عَلَيۡكُمۡ مِّدۡرَارًا ( Al Quran 71: 11 ) Allah saying He will send rain to you in abundance the next verse وَّيُمۡدِدۡكُمۡ بِاَمۡوَالٍ وَّبَنِيۡنَ وَيَجۡعَلۡ لَّـكُمۡ جَنّٰتٍ وَّيَجۡعَلۡ لَّـكُمۡ اَنۡهٰرًا ( Al Quran 71 : 12 ) Give you increase in wealth and sons; and bestow on you gardens and bestow on you rivers (of flowing water)

== In narrations ==
- Ibn Abbas narrated Muhammad said, "Whoever increases seeking forgiveness, God will grant him relief from every worry, a way out from every hardship, and provide for him in ways he does not expect."
- Abu Hurayrah narrated Muhammad said, "A servant committed a sin and said, "O God, forgive me of my sin." God, the Most Blessed and Exalted, says, 'My servant committed a sin and knows he has a Lord who forgives sins and holds him accountable.' Then the servant returned to his sin and said, 'O God, forgive me of my sin.' God says, 'My servant committed a sin and knows he has a Lord who forgives sins and holds him accountable.' Then the servant returned to his sin and said, 'O God, forgive me of my sin.' God says, 'My servant committed a sin and knows he has a Lord who forgives sins and holds him accountable, so do what you wish as I have forgiven you.'"
- Anas ibn Malik narrated Muhammad said, "God, the Most High, says, 'O son of Adam, if you call on me and place your hope in me, I will forgive you despite what is within you, and I will not hesitate. O son of Adam, if you have sins piling up to the clouds and then ask for my forgiveness, I will forgive you, and I will not hesitate. O son of Adam, if you come to me with enough sins to fill the earth, and then meet me without associating anything with Me, I will come to you with enough forgiveness to fill the earth."
- Abu ad-Darda narrated Muhammad said, "God, the Most High, says, 'O son of Adam, whenever you worship me and place your hopes in me, without associating anything with me, I will forgive whatever you have done. If you turn to me with the likes of the heavens and earth full of sins and shortcomings, I will turn to you with the same amount of forgiveness, and I do not mind.'"
- Abu Dharr al-Ghifari narrated Muhammad said, "Indeed, God, the Most Majestic and Glorious, says, 'O my servant, as long as you worship me and place your hopes in me, I will forgive you despite what you have done. O my servant, if you meet me with enough sins to fill the earth, I will meet you with as much forgiveness, as long as you do not associate anything with me."
- It was narrated Muhammad said, "I seek the forgiveness of God, and I repent to him" (astaghfiru llāha wa-atūbu ilayh) 80/100 times a day.

== Significance ==
- Istighfar safeguards the supplicant against the evil consequences of their sins.
- Istighfar increases the blessings of Allah (both material and spiritual).
- Istighfar is one of the ways of finding inner peace and tranquillity.
- Istighfar purifies one from the physiological results of sins.
- Istighfar turns evil deeds into good deeds.
- Istighfar paves the way for the acceptance of prayer.
- Allah forgives those who sincerely seek forgiveness unconditionally.
- The Prophet said: "Whoever makes Istighfar frequently, Allah will provide a way for him out of every distress and provide for him from sources he could never expect."

== Conditions for istighfar ==
Seeking forgiveness has three conditions, with an additional fourth one if the sin involves the violation of another person's rights:

1. To discontinue the sin.
2. To regret having committed it.
3. To resolve to never return to sin.
4. To restore the rights of the person that has been wronged.

== Etiquette ==
The etiquette of seeking forgiveness are:

- Istighfar during the dawn (sahar سَحَر – the late time of night before the daylight – time before daybreak).
- Istighfar the eve before or during Jumu'ah.
- To recognize one has wronged.
- Confession (to God) of one's mistakes. (If necessary, confession to the person involved.)
- Testimony of faith and submission to God.
- Stop the sin, regret the sin, repent and intend to never do it again.

Note: Istighfar can be done at any time. Above mentioned are a few Sunnahs followed by Prophet Muhammed's teachings.

== Istighfar of prophets ==
The Istighfar of an ordinary person was not a special case since they are not infallible. However, in the case of the prophets and angels, such an act may be interpreted otherwise because it contradicts the attribute of infallibility in the prophets. However, there is some relevant evidence showing the fact that prophets and angels were also engaged in asking for divine forgiveness.

"The heavens nearly burst, one above the other, ˹in awe of Him˺. And the angels glorify the praises of their Lord, and seek forgiveness for those on earth. Surely Allah alone is the All-Forgiving, Most Merciful." (Al Quran 42:5)

== Related invocations ==
رَبَّنَا إِنَّنَا آمَنَّا فَٱغْفِرْ لَنَا ذُنُوبَنَا وَقِنَا عَذَابَ ٱلنَّارِ

Rabba-nā inna-nā Ãman-nā fa-ʾaghfir la-nā ḏunūba-nā wa-qinā ʿaḏāba -n-nār.

Our Lord! We have believed, so forgive our sins and protect us from the torment of the Fire.

— Mustafa Khattab, The Clear Quran

سُبْحَانَكَ تُبْتُ إِلَيْكَ وَأَنَا۠ أَوَّلُ ٱلْمُؤْمِنِينَ

Subḥāna-ka tub-tu ilay-ka wa-ana awwalu -l-muʾminīn.

Glory be to You! I turn to You in repentance, and I am the first of the believers.

— Mustafa Khattab, The Clear Quran

ٱللَّٰهُمَّ إنِّي أسْأَلُكَ يَا ٱللَّٰهُ بِأَنَّكَ ٱلْوَاحِدُ ٱلأَحَدُ ٱلصَّمَدُ ٱلَّذِي لَمْ يَلِدْ وَلَمْ يُولَدْ وَلَمْ يَكُنْ لَهُ كُفُوًا أَحَدٌ أَنْ تَغْفِرَ لِي ذُنُوبِي إِنَّكَ أَنْتَ ٱلْغَفُورُ ٱلَّرَحِيمُ

Allahumma inni as'aluka ya Allah! Bi-annakal-Wahidul-Ahad us-Samad, alladhi lam yalid wa lam yowled, wa lam yakun lahu kufuwan ahad, an taghfirali dhunubi, innaka antal-Ghafurur-Rahim.

O Allah! I ask You, O Allah, You are the One, the Only, Self Sufficient Master, who was not begotten and begets not and none is equal to Him. Forgive me my sins, surely you are Forgiving, Merciful.

— Narrated by Hanzalah bin 'Ali (R.A.), Sunan an-Nasa'i: The Book of Forgetfulness (In Prayer) V.2, Book 13, Hadith 123

ٱللَّٰهُمَّ ٱغْفِرْ لِي وَٱرْحَمْنِي وَعَافِنِي وَٱهْدِنِي وَٱرْزُقْنِي

Allahumma-ghfir li, warhamni, wa 'afini, wahdini, warzuqni.

O Allah! Forgive me, have mercy on me, guide me, guard me against harm and provide me with sustenance and salvation.

— Narrated by Tariq bin Ashyam (R.A.), Riyad as-Salihin: The Book of Du'a (Supplications) Book 16, Hadith 5

ٱللَّٰهُمَّ أَنْتَ رَبِّي لَا إِلَٰهَ إِلَّا أَنْتَ خَلَقْتَنِي وَأَنَا عَبْدُكَ وَأَنَا عَلَىٰ عَهْدِكَ وَوَعْدِكَ مَا ٱسْتَطَعْتُ أَعُوذُ بِكَ مِنْ شَرِّ مَا صَنَعْتُ أَبُوءُ لَكَ بِنِعْمَتِكَ عَلَيَّ وَأَبُوءُ لَكَ بِذَنْبِي فَٱغْفِرْ لِي فَإِنَّهُ لَا يَغْفِرُ ٱلذُّنُوبَ إِلَّا أَنْتَ

Allahumma anta Rabbi la ilaha illa anta, Khalaqtani wa ana `Abduka, wa ana `ala `ahdika wa wa`dika mastata`tu, A`udhu bika min Sharri ma sana`tu, abu'u Laka bini`matika `alaiya, wa abu'u laka bidhanbi faghfir lee fa innahu la yaghfiru adhdhunuba illa anta.

O Allah! You are my Lord! None has the right to be worshipped but You. You created me, and I am Your slave, and I am faithful to my covenant and my promise as much as I can. I seek refuge with You from all the evil I have done. I acknowledge before You all the blessings You have bestowed upon me, and I confess to You all my sins. So I entreat You to forgive my sins, for nobody can forgive sins except You.

— Narrated by Shaddad bin Aus (R.A.), Sahih al-Bukhari: Invocations, V.8, Book 80, Hadith 3

If somebody recites it during the day with firm belief in it, and dies on the same day before the evening, he will be from the people of Paradise; and if somebody recites it at night with firm faith in it, and dies before the morning, he will be from the people of Paradise.
