= Al-Ḥalīm =

One of the names of God in Islam

al-Ḥalīm (ALA-LC romanization of Arabic: الحليم) is one of the Names of Allah. It may be part of the 99 Names of Allah, by which Muslims regard Allah and which are traditionally maintained as described in the Qur'ān, and Sunnah, amongst other places.

== Linguistic meaning ==
Ḥalīm comes from the root "hilm", which has the following classical Arabic connotations: to be forbearing, mild, lenient, clement; to be forgiving, gentle, deliberate; to be leisurely in manner, not hasty; to be calm, serene; to manage one's temper; or to exhibit moderation. Having "hilm" can be understood to have a wisdom and a forbearance that allows a person to control their anger. Hilm is an intelligence that, in our terms, allows someone to control their anger, even if their anger is justified. It allows you to, when you are justifiably angry, control it and not manifest it.

== Commentary ==
In his book, "Al-Maqsad Al-Asna fi Sharah Asma' Allahu al-Husna" ("The best means in explaining Allah's Beautiful Names"), Imam Al Ghazali translates Al-Ḥalīm as "The Non-Precipitate and Forbearing One". He states that Al-Ḥalīm is "the One Who Witnesses the disobedience of the disobedient, the One Who Sees the violation of the command ('amr). But Anger does not rouse Him and Rage does not seize Him. He is not one Who is prompted by haste and recklessness to take Swift Vengeance, even though He has unlimited Power to do so." He then quotes verse 35:45 from the Quran: "And were Allah to punish men for what they earn, He would not leave on the back of it (surface of the earth) any creature..."

Ibn al-Qayyim said in al-Nooniyyah: "He is the Forbearing and does not hasten the punishment for His slave, (granting him respite) so that he may repent from his sin."

Al-Sa’di said in his Tafseer: “Al-Ḥalīm is the One Who keeps bestowing blessings, both visible and hidden, on His creation, even though they disobey Him and make many mistakes. So He forgives and does not give the sinners the punishment they deserve; He encourages them to repent and gives them time to turn to Him.”

== Occurrence in Quran ==
Al-Ḥalīm is seen in various ayat in the Quran. For example, 2:235, 2:263, 4:12, 5:101, 17:44, 22:59, 33:51, 35:41, 64:17. Al-Ḥalīm is usually paired with various other Names of Allah in the Quran.

For example, it is paired with Al Ghaffur (The Most Forgiving One) and some have said that this pairing means that not only does He overlook our actions and not get Angry, He forgives and covers them up and protects us from the effects of them. This is so because Al Ghaffur is said to come from the verb ghafara (غَفَرَ), which means to cover.

It is also paired with the Attribute Al Aleem (The All-Knowing), which some say implies that despite His Knowledge of our actions, He’s still controlling His Anger, though we deserve to be shown His Anger.

Another pairing is with His Name, Al Ghani (The Self Sufficient, Rich beyond any need). Some say this pairing means that He doesn't need anything from us and yet He is still forgiving us for our mistakes and sins. This shows His Attribute of Clemency. It can be argued that when a judge or a police officer lets a person off the hook with a crime; maybe they chose that action because of some benefit towards them. Allah does not benefit in any way, shape or form from any of his creation. This can be greatly understood by Prophet Musa in his statement in verse 14:8 in the Quran: “If you were to be ungrateful, you and everyone on Earth, Allah is Rich Beyond Need, Praiseworthy."

Another pairing is with His Name As Shakur (The Appreciative). This pairing can mean that not only will the sins of believers be overlooked, they will be rewarded with more than they deserve.

== Occurrence in Hadith ==
It was narrated by Imam Ahmad, Imam Bukhari, and Imam Muslim, on the authority of Ibn Abbas that the Islamic prophet Muhammad, encouraged the saying of this supplication at the time of distress: "La ilaha illallahul-Azimul-Halim. La ilaha illallahu Rabbul-'Arshil-'Azim. La ilaha illallahu Rabbus-samawati, wa Rabbul-ardi, wa Rabbul-'Arshil- Karim. (None has the right to be worshipped but Allah the Incomparably Great, the Compassionate. None has the right to be worshipped but Allah the Lord of the Mighty Throne. None has the right to be worshiped but Allah the Lord of the heavens, the Lord of the earth, and the Lord of the Honourable Throne.)"

Imam al-Tabarani also narrated on the authority of Ali ibn Abi Talib that Muhammad taught him to say the following words at times of fear: "la illaha il allah al-Ḥalīm al-Kareem, Subhan'Allah wa tabarak Allah rabb al-‘Arsh al-‘Adheem, wal Hamdulilahi Rabb al-‘Alameen" (There is no god but God, The Forbearing and Generous. Glory be to Allah and Blessed is Allah, The Lord of the Mighty Throne and all praise is due to Allah, The Lord of all the worlds).
