= Al-Muṣawwir =

One of the names of God in Islam

Al-Muṣawwir written in Arabic

Al-Muṣawwir or Muṣawwir (Arabic: المصور) is one of the names of God (Allah) in Islam, meaning "The Shaper," "The Bestower of Forms," or "The Fashioner." In Islamic theology, this name refers to God’s role as the creator of all things; shaping and forming them. It reflects the Islamic belief about God's role as the one who determines the structure and appearance of all in creation. This name also signifies the muslim belief of God's profound ability to shape things whenever and however so; underscoring his unlimited capacity to mold and design the universe and what is in it. Lastly, this name underscores that God, in Islamic theology, is the creator of all forms, encomposing contrasts in size, beauty, gender, etc. It highlights his role as the shaper of each individual, molding the development of infants during the womb stage.

== Al-Muṣawwir in the Quran ==
(هُوَ ٱللَّهُ ٱلْخَٰلِقُ ٱلْبَارِئُ ٱلْمُصَوِّرُ ۖ لَهُ ٱلْأَسْمَآءُ ٱلْحُسْنَىٰ ۚ يُسَبِّحُ لَهُۥ مَا فِى ٱلسَّمَٰوَٰتِ وَٱلْأَرْضِ ۖ وَهُوَ ٱلْعَزِيزُ ٱلْحَكِيمُ)

He is Allah, the Creator, the Inventor, the Fashioner; to Him belong the best names. Whatever is in the heavens and earth is exalting Him. And He is the Exalted in Might, the Wise.

— Quran 59:24 [Sahih International]

(هُوَ الَّذِي يُصَوِّرُكُمْ فِي الأَرْحَامِ كَيْفَ يَشَاءُ لا إِلَهَ إِلَّا هُوَ الْعَزِيزُ الْحَكِيمُ)

It is He who forms you in the wombs however He wills. There is no deity except Him, the Exalted in Might, the Wise.

— Quran 3:6 [Sahih International]

== See also ==
- Names of God in Islam
