= Pancar Merah =

Islamic talisman

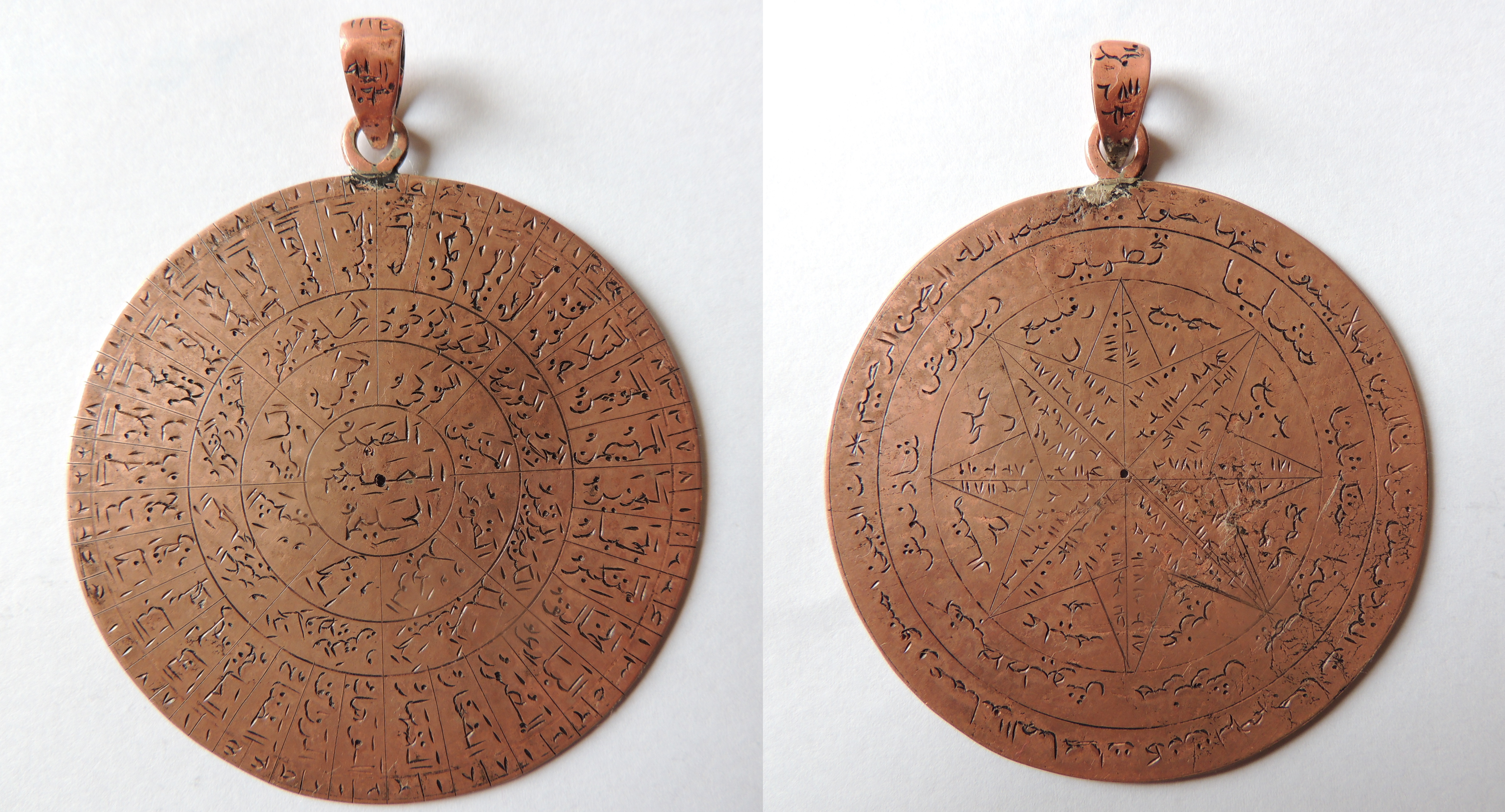
Pancar Merah made of copper between 1920 -1940, attributed to Kyai Suntul from Dalam Pagar village

Pancar Merah is an Islamic talisman found among the Banjar people from South Borneo. It is used to protect and defend the bearer when dealing with people of high status, such as tribal leaders or kings.

Pancar Merah is circular in shape, with a diameter ranging from 50 to 70 mm. It is made from materials such as silver, copper, silver plated copper, or brass and is richly engraved on both sides with Arabic scripts. On the front side a Pancar Merah is usually engraved with the 99 Names of Allah (Al Asma Ul Husna) and the back side is engraved with inscriptions based on the specific wishes of the talisman's orderer (fortune, charisma, security, love, etc.).

Pancar Merah is made by a skilled person with a high spiritual level, usually a kyai (ulama, sheikh), and it is crafted only in certain times or periods before or after praying or fasting.

The most notable pieces of Pancar Merah were made in desa (village) Dalam Pagar near Martapura, South Kalimantan, Indonesia before World War II.
