= An-Nasr =

110th chapter of the Qur'an

Surah 110 of the Quran
ٱلنَّصْر An-Naṣr Succour
- Qira'ah; English text
- Classification: Medinan
- Other names: Triumph, Divine Support, The Help
- Position: Juzʼ 30
- No. of verses: 3
- No. of words: 19
- No. of letters: 80

An-Nasr
Recitation of An-Nasr in mujawwad.

An-Naṣr (Arabic: النَّصْر, romanized: an-naṣr, lit. 'Help', or '[Divine] Support') is the 110th chapter (sūrah) of the Qur'an with 3 āyāt or verses.

۝ WHEN the assistance of Allah shall come, and the victory;
۝ and thou shalt see the people enter into the religion of Allah by troops:
۝ celebrate the praise of thy LORD, and ask pardon of him; for he is inclined to forgive.

An-Nasr translates to English as both "the victory" and "the help or assistance". It is the second-shortest surah after Al-Kawthar. Surah 112 (al-Ikhlāṣ) actually has fewer words in Arabic than Surah An-Naṣr, yet it has four verses.

== Text and meaning ==
=== Text and transliteration ===
- Hafs from Aasim ibn Abi al-Najud

بِسْمِ ٱللَّهِ ٱلرَّحْمَٰنِ ٱلرَّحِيمِ ۝
Bismi l-lāhi r-raḥmāni r-raḥīm(i)
إِذَا جَآءَ نَصْرُ ٱللّٰهِ وَٱلْفَتْحُ ۝١
¹ ʾidhā jāʾa naṣru l-lāhi walfatḥ(u)
وَرَأَيْتَ ٱلنَّاسَ يَدْخُلُونَ فِى دِينِ ٱللّٰهِ أَفْوَاجًا ۝٢
² Waraʾayta n-nāsa yadkhulūna fī dīni l-lāhi ʾafwājā(n)
فَسَبِّحْ بِحَمْدِ رَبِّكَ وَٱسْتَغْفِرْهُ ^{ج} إِنَّهُ كَانَ تَوَّابًا ۝٣
³ Fasabbiḥ biḥamdi rabbika wastaghfirh(u), ʾinnahu kāna tawwābā(n)

- Warsh from Nafiʽ al-Madani

بِسمِ اِللهِ اِلرَّحمَٰنِ اِلرَّحِيمِ ۝
Bismi l-lāhi r-raḥmāni r-raḥīm(i)
إِذَا جَآءَ نَصرُ اللهِ وَالفَتحُ ۝١
¹ ʾidhā jāʾa naṣru l-lāhi walfatḥ(u)
وَرَأَيتَ اَلنَّاسَ يَدخُلُونَ فِے دِينِ اِللهِ أَفوَاجًا ۝٢
² Waraʾayta n-nāsa yadkhulūna fī dīni l-lāhi ʾafwājā(n)
فَسَبِّح بِحَمدِ رَبِّكَ وَاستَغفِرهُ ^{ج} إِنَّهُ كَانَ تَوَّابًا ۝٣
³ Fasabbiḥ biḥamdi rabbika wastaghfirh(u), ʾinnahū kāna tawwābā(n)

=== Meanings ===
^{1} When comes the help of God (to you, O Muhammad against your enemies) and the conquest (of Makkah),
^{2} And you see that the people enter God’s religion (Islam) in crowds,
^{3} So glorify the praises of your Lord, and ask for His forgiveness. Verily, He is the One Who accepts the repentance and forgives.

Translation: Noble Quran, 1990

^{1} When the victory of God has come and the conquest,
^{2} And you see the people entering into the religion of God in multitudes,
^{3} Then exalt [Him] with praise of your Lord and ask forgiveness of Him. Indeed, He is ever Accepting of repentance.

Translation: Saheeh International, 1997

^{1} When comes the help of God, and victory,
^{2} And thou dost see the people enter God’s religion in crowds,
^{3} Celebrate the praises of thy Lord, and pray for His forgiveness: for He is Oft-Returning (in grace and mercy).

Translation: Yusuf Ali, 1934

^{1} When God’s succour and the triumph cometh
^{2} And thou seest mankind entering the religion of God in troops,
^{3} Then hymn the praises of thy Lord, and seek forgiveness of Him. Lo! He is ever ready to show mercy.

Translation: Pickthall, 1930

== Summary ==
- 1–3 Command to praise God for the victory of Islam

The surah praises Allah for leading numerous people to Islam. This surah is also known as "The Victory" as in the victory of Islam as it refers to the conquest of Mecca where Muslims beat the enemies of Islam.

According to Tafsir ibn Kathir, this surah is equal to 1/4 of the Quran. This was the last surah to be revealed, only a few months before Muhammad's death.

The first ayah means that with God's help, the Muslims prevailed. The second ayah means that after the battle crowds of people came to accept Islam. The third ayah means that God allowed people to join Islam and gave them a second chance no matter how harsh their crimes are, because God is the all-forgiving to humankind.
