= Parvardigar =

Parvardigar (Persian: پروردگار, romanized: Parwardigār, lit. 'sustainer'; Persian pronunciation: [parwardiˈɡaːr]) is an appellation or title for God (Khuda in Persian) in New Persian. It corresponds to one of the Arabic names of God in Islam, ar-Razzāq "The Provider".
