= Al-Mu'min (Islamic figure) =

Minor figure mentioned in the Qur'an

Al-Mu'min (Arabic: المُؤْمِنٌ, lit. 'The Believer'), also known as Rajulun Mu'minun min Āl Fir'awn (Arabic: رَجُلٌ مُؤْمِنٌ مِنْ آلِ فِرْعَوْنَ, lit. 'The Believer from the people of the Pharaoh'), is a name given to a brief but distinguished unnamed figure mentioned in Surat Ghafir, the 40th chapter (surah) of the Qur'an. The believer is mentioned to be from the people of the Pharaoh but supported Moses' mission while hiding his faith. Over many centuries, many interpretations of this figure emerged among Islamic theologians including Ibn Kathir.

== In the Qur'an ==
Al-Mu'min is mentioned in only three verses, 28 to 30. Starting from the 23rd verse, the chapter discusses an incident in Moses' life when Pharaoh, Haman, and Korah rejected him despite coming at them with evidence. The Pharaoh said he wanted to kill Moses for turning himself to Allah until the believer confronted him:

۝A believing man from Pharaoh’s people, who was hiding his faith, argued, “Will you kill a man for saying: ‘My Lord is Allah,’ while he has in fact come to you with clear proofs from your Lord? If he is a liar, it will be to his own loss. But if he is truthful, then you will be afflicted with some of what he is threatening you with. Surely Allah does not guide whoever is a transgressor, a total liar.
۝O my people! Authority belongs to you today, reigning supreme in the land. But who would help us against the torment of Allah, if it were to befall us?” Pharaoh assured, “I am telling you only what I believe, and I am leading you only to the way of guidance.”
۝And the man who believed cautioned, “O my people! I truly fear for you the doom of ˹earlier˺ enemy forces—

== Interpretations ==
Chronologically in Islam, he was among the first to believe from the people of Moses. He is believed to have lived among the family of Pharaoh, but his allegiance was not to him, but rather to God through obedience. The believer's name is not given nor is his position, yet he played an important role in the narrative by saving Moses' life through negotiations with the Pharaoh, who discussed the idea of killing Moses because of his faith. However, the believer kept his faith from the Pharaoh a secret.

Qur'anic exegete al-Suddī interpreted the believer to be a family member of the Pharaoh, specifically his cousin. A position that al-Tabari preferred and rejected the statement of that the believer was an Israelite because Pharaoh listened to him and refrained from killing him. Had he been an Israelite, he would have been swiftly punished, since he was one of them.
