= Al-ʻAfūw =

One of the names of God in Islam

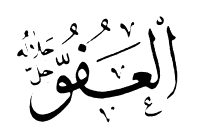

al-ʻAfūw (Arabic: العفو) is one of the names of God in Islam. It means The Pardoner, The Most Forgiving, The Effacing, The Eliminator of Sins. It is one of the 99 Names of God used by Muslims to refer to God, and is described in Qur'an and Sunnah.

== Occurrence in Quran ==
As a name of God, Al-’Afuw can be found in the Qur'an five times. It is linked several times with Al-Ghafoor (4:43, 4:99, 22:60, 58:2) and once with Al-Qadeer (4:149).

== Occurrence in Hadith ==
Al-ʿAfuw can also be found in one of the six major Sunni Hadith books, Sunan Al-Tirmidhi. In Book 9, Hadith 1195, it is mentioned:

Hazrat Aisha (R.A) asked Prophet Muhammad (ﷺ): “O Messenger of God! If I realize Lailatu l-Qadr (Night of Decree), what should I supplicate in it?”. He replied, “You should supplicate:

'O God, You are the Most Forgiving, You love forgiveness, so forgive me'.”

اَلْلَّٰهُمَّ اِنَّكَ عَفُوٌّ تُحِبُّ الْعَفْوَ فَاعْفُ عَنِّي

Allahumma innaka ʿafuwwun tuhibbu l-ʿafwa faʿfu ʿanni

This supplication is often recited by Muslims in the last 10 nights of the holy month of Ramadan.
