= Al-Ghafūr =

One of the names of God in Islam

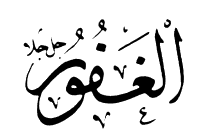
Al-Ghafūr in Arabic

Al-Ghafūr is one of the Names of God in Islam. It means The Ever-Forgiving or The All-Forgiving. It is part of the 99 Names of God, by which Muslims regard God, and it is described in Qur'ān and Sunnah.

== Linguistic translation of Al-Ghafūr ==
The root verb of Al-Ghaffoor and Al-Ghaffaar is gha-fa-ra (غَفَرَ) which points to three main meanings:

1. The first meaning is to cover, veil, conceal, and hide.
2. The second meaning is to pardon, to forgive, and to set aright.
3. And the third meaning is to cover a thing to protect it (from dirt).

== Occurrence in the Qur'an ==
God’s name Al-Ghafūr occurs 91 times in the Quran, making it one of the most common names mentioned there, and is often mentioned alongside other Attributes of God:

- Ar-Raheem ('The Merciful'): is mentioned 72 times with Al-Ghafūr, one of the most common sets of pairs of Allah’s names.
- Al-Haleem ('The Forbearing one'): 6 times.
- Al-'Afuw ('The Pardoner' or 'The Most-Forgiving'): 4 times.
- Ash-Shakūr ('The Appreciative'): 3 times
- Al-Aziz ('The Almighty' or 'The Honorable'): twice.
- Al-Waduwd ('The Most Loving'): once.
