= Muhammad Mahmud Ghali =

Muhammad Mahmud Ghali (1920–29 November 2016) was the Professor of Linguistics and Islamic Studies, Al-Azhar University, Cairo, Egypt. Ghali studied phonetics at the University of Exeter in the UK before obtaining his PhD in Phonetics from the University of Michigan. He spent 20 years interpreting the meanings of the Quran into English. He was author of an English translation of the Quran, Towards Understanding the Ever-Glorious Quran.

Ghali authored 16 books in Islamic studies, in Arabic as well as in English. The English books include Prophet Muhammad and the First Muslim State, Moral Freedom in Islam, Islam and Universal Peace, Synonyms in the Ever-Glorious Quran. Ghali was the founder of the faculty of languages and translation at Al-Azhar University. In addition to being a full-time professor at the same faculty, he was also a permanent member of many Islamic organizations working in the field of interpreting the meanings of the Quran into different languages in Egypt, Saudi Arabia, Turkey, and other countries.
