= Ibrahim (surah) =

14th chapter of the Qur'an

Surah 14 of the Quran
إبراهيم Ibrāhīm Abraham
- Qira'ah; English text
- Classification: Meccan
- Time of revelation: Not long before Hijrat-e-Madina
- Position: Juzʼ 13
- Hizb no.: 26
- No. of verses: 52
- No. of Rukus: 7
- No. of words: 830
- No. of letters: 3539

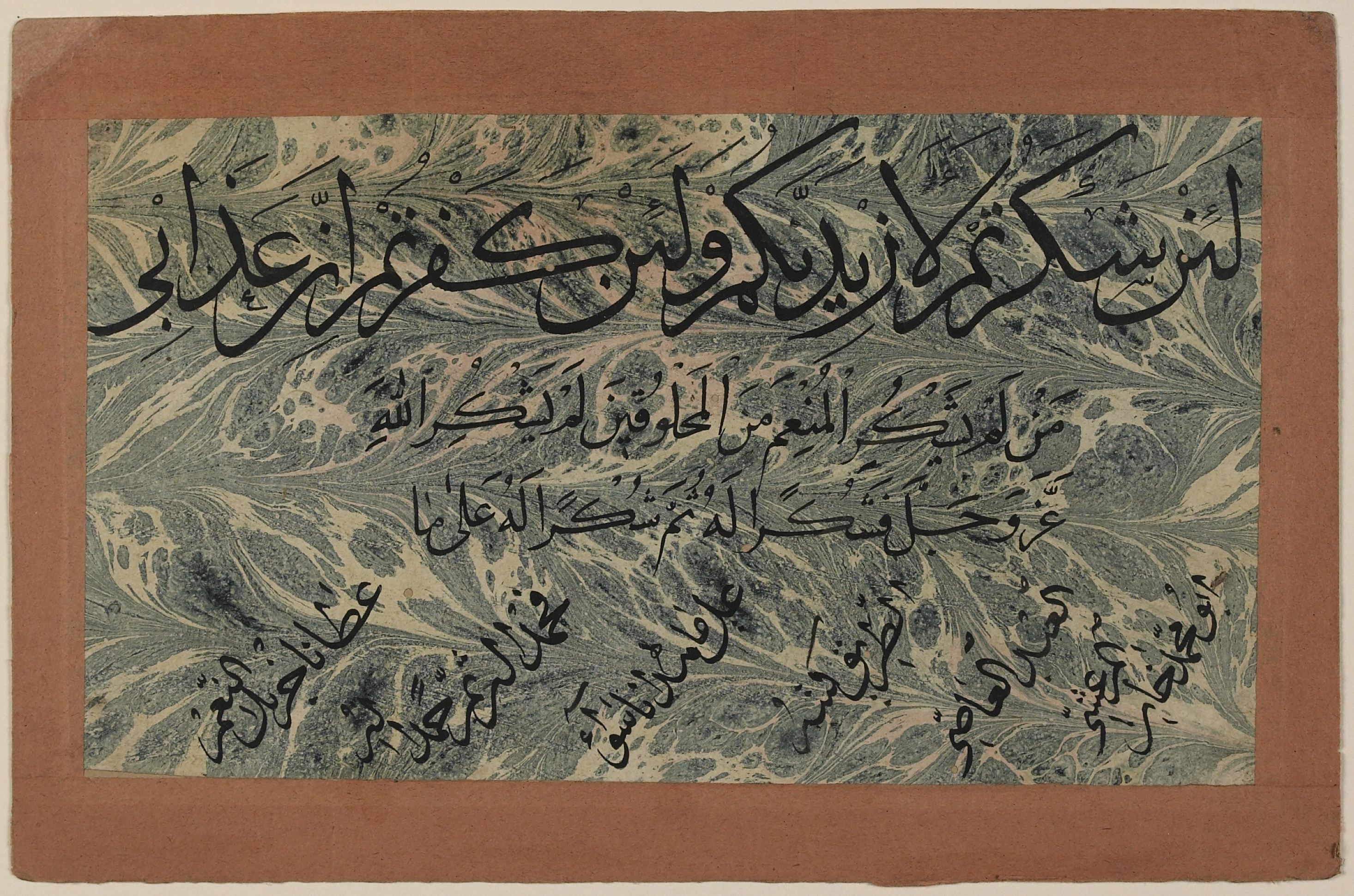
A panel with Surah Ibrahim (14:7): " (And remember, your Lord caused to be declared): If you are grateful, I will add more favors to you, but if you show ingratitude, truly My punishment is terrible," followed by praises of God.

Ibrahim (Arabic: إبراهيم, Ibrāhīm "Abraham") is the 14th chapter (surah) of the Qur'an with 52 verses (āyāt). Regarding the timing and contextual background of the revelation (asbāb al-nuzūl), it is a "Meccan surah", which means it is believed to have been revealed in Mecca, instead of later in Medina. It was revealed around 2–3 years before Hijrah, in a later stage of Muhammad preaching in Mecca when persecution of him and fellow Muslims had become severe.

The surah emphasizes that only God knows what goes on inside a man's heart, implying we must accept each other's words in good faith (14:38).

== Summary ==
1–5: Purpose of Revelation & Role of Prophets

6–8: Reminder of Allah’s Favor & Warning of Ingratitude

9–14: Past Nations and Their Rejection of Prophets

15–17: Scene from Hell & Fate of the Arrogant

18–20: Worthlessness of Disbelief

21–22: Shaytan’s Speech & Regret of Followers

23–27: Parables and Reward of Believers

Verses 24–25: Parable of the good tree – symbol of pure faith.

Verse 26: Parable of the evil tree – symbol of falsehood

28–30: Ingratitude and Idol Worship

31–34: Commands to Believers & Signs of Allah

35–41: Prophet Ibrahim’s Supplications

42–44: Warning of the Day of Judgment

45–48: Proof from Past Nations & Promise of Judgment

49–52: Final Scene & Conclusion

== Name ==
This chapter's name is Surah Ibrahim (Arabic) or Chapter of Abraham (English). Surahs of the Quran are not always named after their thematic content, but in this case a large section of the surah (ayat 35–41) focus on a prayer of Abraham's, which reveals the quality of Abraham's character.

== Time of revelation ==
It shows up from the tone of the Surah that it has a place with that group of the Surahs which were revealed during the last phase of the Makkan time frame. For example, v. 13 "The disbelievers cautioned their Messengers, 'you will need to come back to our community or we will certainly remove you from our territory'" clearly shows that the mistreatment of the Muslims was at its peak at the hour of the revealing of this Surah, and the individuals of Makkah were set on ousting the Believers from that point like the disbelievers of the previous Prophets. That is the reason in v. 14 they have been cautioned, "We will annihilate these evildoers," and the Believers have been comforted similar to the believers before them, "and after them settle you in the land" Likewise the harsh admonition contained in the finishing up partition (vv. 43-52 likewise affirms that the Surah identifies with the last phase of the Makkan Period.)

== Focal theme ==
This Surah is a caution and an admonition to the disbelievers who were dismissing the message of Muhammad and concocting cunning plans to crush his Mission. Be that as it may, notice, impugning, scold and rebuke overwhelm admonition. This is on the grounds that a decent arrangement of reprimand had just been made in the preceding Surahs, however notwithstanding this their stiff necked attitude, ill will, opposition, wickedness, abuse and so on had rather expanded.

In Surah Ibrahim (14:24–26), Allah presents two powerful tree parables using the imagery of trees to illustrate the difference between truth and falsehood, belief and disbelief. The first is the parable of the good tree, which symbolizes a pure word. This tree is described as having firm roots and branches that reach into the sky, bearing fruit at all times by Allah’s permission. Seyyed Hossein Nasr, in his Study Quran interprets this verse as:

"A good word is understood to refer here to the formula of the shahādah, “There is no god but God” (Q), and a good tree can be a reference to the date palm (Kl). In a famous report narrated by ʿAbd Allāh ibn ʿUmar, the son of the second Caliph ʿUmar ibn al-Khaṭṭāb, the Prophet asked his Companions if they knew what kind of tree was being referred to in this verse. Ibn ʿUmar knew the answer, but was too shy to speak in front of his elders. Then the Prophet revealed the answer, and it was just as Ibn ʿUmar had thought: it was a date palm.

Like the date palm, which is firmly rooted in the earth, so too is the meaning of the shahādah (“There is no god but God”) firmly rooted in the hearts of the people of Divine Unity (Aj). Al-Rāzī refers to this same reality by saying that when the tree of knowledge is firmly rooted in the land of one’s heart, one becomes stronger and more complete, thereby enabling “fruit” to issue forth from its “branches” in abundance. This tree of knowledge, which is rooted in the land of one’s heart, thus has “branches” that are in the sky; that is, it has forms of knowledge that reach the Divine realm (R). This tree thus brings forth fruit in every season, which is to say that the soul of a person who is firmly rooted in knowledge develops a spiritual disposition through which it produces “fruit” perpetually in the form of beautiful words, righteous actions, a state of humility, self-effacement, weeping, and lowliness (R)."

In contrast, the evil word is likened to a bad tree, which is easily uprooted and has no stability. This represents falsehood, such as disbelief or hypocrisy, which lacks foundation and permanence. Just as an uprooted tree cannot grow or bear fruit, the speech and actions of disbelievers hold no real value and quickly fade away.
