= Al-Shakūr =

One of the names of God in Islam

Ash-Shakūr (ALA-LC romanization of Arabic: الشكور) is one of the names of God in Islam. It is a part of the 99 Names of God.

== Meaning ==
Ash-Shakūr can be variously translated as: "The most grateful", "The rewarder of good deeds" or "The most appreciative". The name is derived from the root shin-kaf-ra (ش ك ر), which has the following classical Arabic connotations: to praise or commend for a benefit or benefits to acknowledge beneficence, to offer thanks, acknowledgement, to be thankful, grateful, to produce, supply, give forth bountifully."

== Occurrence in the Quran ==
Al-Shakūr can be found in various verses in the Quran such as verses 35:30, 35:34, 42:23, and 64:17. "
