= Names of God in Islam =

Al-Asma Ul-Husna

Names of Allah in Arabic calligraphy.

Names of God in Islam (Arabic: أَسْمَاءُ ٱللَّٰهِ ٱلْحُسْنَىٰ, romanized: ʾasmāʾu l-Lāhi l-ḥusnā, lit. 'God's Beautiful Names') are the names that each contain attributes of God in Islam, implied by the respective properties. Some names are known from only from the Quran or hadith, while others can be found in both sources, although most are found in the Quran.

Allāh is the Arabic word referring to God in Abrahamic religions, thought to be derived by contraction from al-ʾilāh, which means "the god" (i.e., the only god, reflecting Tawhid), and is related to El and Elah, the Hebrew and Aramaic words for God. Whether or not Allah can be considered as the personal name of God became disputed in contemporary scholarship. In Islamic usage and indoctrination, Allah was the God's most unique, proper name, and referred to as Lafẓ al-Jalālah (The Word of Majesty). Those who claimed that Allah was the personal name of God also denied that this name was a derivative name. Some Muslims may use different names as much as Allah, for instance Rabb, Ar-Rahman, or "God" in English. The Quran refers to the attributes of God as "most beautiful names".

They are traditionally enumerated as 99 in number to which is added as the highest Name (al-ism al-ʾaʿẓam), the Supreme Name of God. The locus classicus for listing the Divine Names in the literature of Qurʾānic commentary is 17:110 "Call upon Allah, or call upon The Merciful; whichsoever you call upon, to Allah belong the most beautiful Names," and also 59:22–24, which includes a cluster of more than a dozen Divine epithets.

— Gerhard Böwering, God and God's Attributes

These names usually denote his praise, gratitude, commendation, glorification, magnification, perfect attributes, majestic qualities, and acts of wisdom, mercy, benefit, and justice from Allah, as believed by Muslims. These names are commonly called upon by Muslims during prayers, supplications, and remembrance, as they hold significant spiritual and theological importance, serving as a means for Muslims to connect with God. Beside these Arabic names, Muslims of non-Arab origins may also sometimes use other names in their own languages to refer to God, such as Khuda in Persian, Bengali and Urdu. Tangri or Tengri was used in the Ottoman Turkish language as the equivalent of Allah.

In Sufis, often characterised as the inner, mystical dimension of Islam, Hu / Huwa, meaning just 'He', or Parvardigar in Persian are used as names of God. Hu derives from the last letter of the word Allah, which is read as Allahu when in the middle of a sentence and appears in many verses as in: "La ilaha illa Hu" Al Imran:18. According to the Wahdat al-wujūd interpretation, the universe was a manifestation of God's—the absolute being—names, and was manifestations or notions with no real existence. Haydar Amuli refused to make any distinction on this matter, arguing that evil beings like Satan were also manifestations of God's imperial names.

== Interactions and translation ==
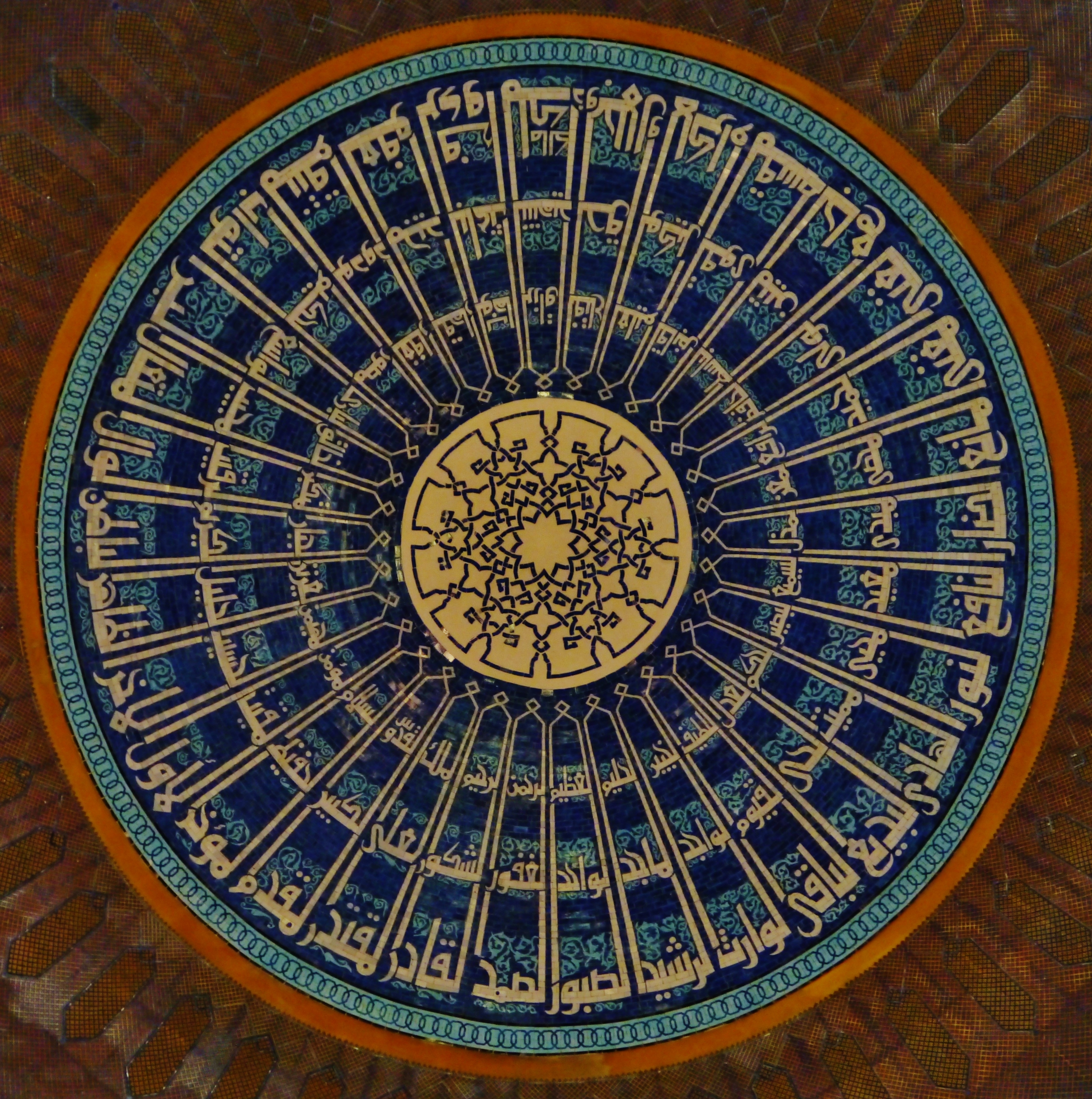
Names of Allah decorating the dome of the Grand Mosque of Kuwait

Some of the names attributed to God in Islamic culture are names that create problems in transition from a personal god to a universal and transcendent god in understanding; ٱلْعَظِيمُ (al-ʿAẓīm) lit means "He was, or became, great in his bone, then metaphorically said of anything كَبِير [or great]". The reflections of the efforts to give a transcendent understanding when translating these names into other languages can also be seen in examples such as al-Mutakabbir (The Proud Oneself), al-Jalīl (The Angry), al-Muntaqim (The Avenger) and at-Tawwāb (The Returner) (see also: Eisegesis).

Islamic theology rejects definitions and expressions that imply a comparison between God and His creations, because He cannot be likened to His creations in any of His attributes. However, it is observed that many of these names are translated as "the most..." in a comparative mode, as in the expression Allāhu ʾAkbar (Arabic: اللّٰهُ أَكْبَر [ʔaɫ.ɫaː.hu ʔak.bar], lit. 'God is the greatest'), which is also used as an Islamic slogan. In Islamic theology the concept of shirk refers to the rejection of any partnership in God's will and actions, and encompasses understandings that liken His attributes to those of created beings, and view them as limited.

In the Quran, names of angels like Gabriel and Michael etc. are linked to El (or Il), as in other Abrahamic religions. The phrase "Allāhumma," used at the beginning of prayers in Islam, should be the Arabic pronunciation of the Hebrew word "Elohim." Elohim is a plural word (singular El) used for exaltation, like the Hebrew expression "Your Majesty!"

Although the holy book and prophets in the Quran frequently connect themselves to Jehovah, the name Yahweh/Jehovah is unknown in Islam. The word "Rabb" (Lord, Master), which is used in place of Yahweh in Judaism, is also frequently used for Allah in the Quran.

The silence surrounding the name Yahweh in Judaism for several thousand years is thought to be connected to the Ten Commandments, "You shall not take the name of your God Yahweh in vain, for Yahweh will not leave it without punishment."

== List of names ==
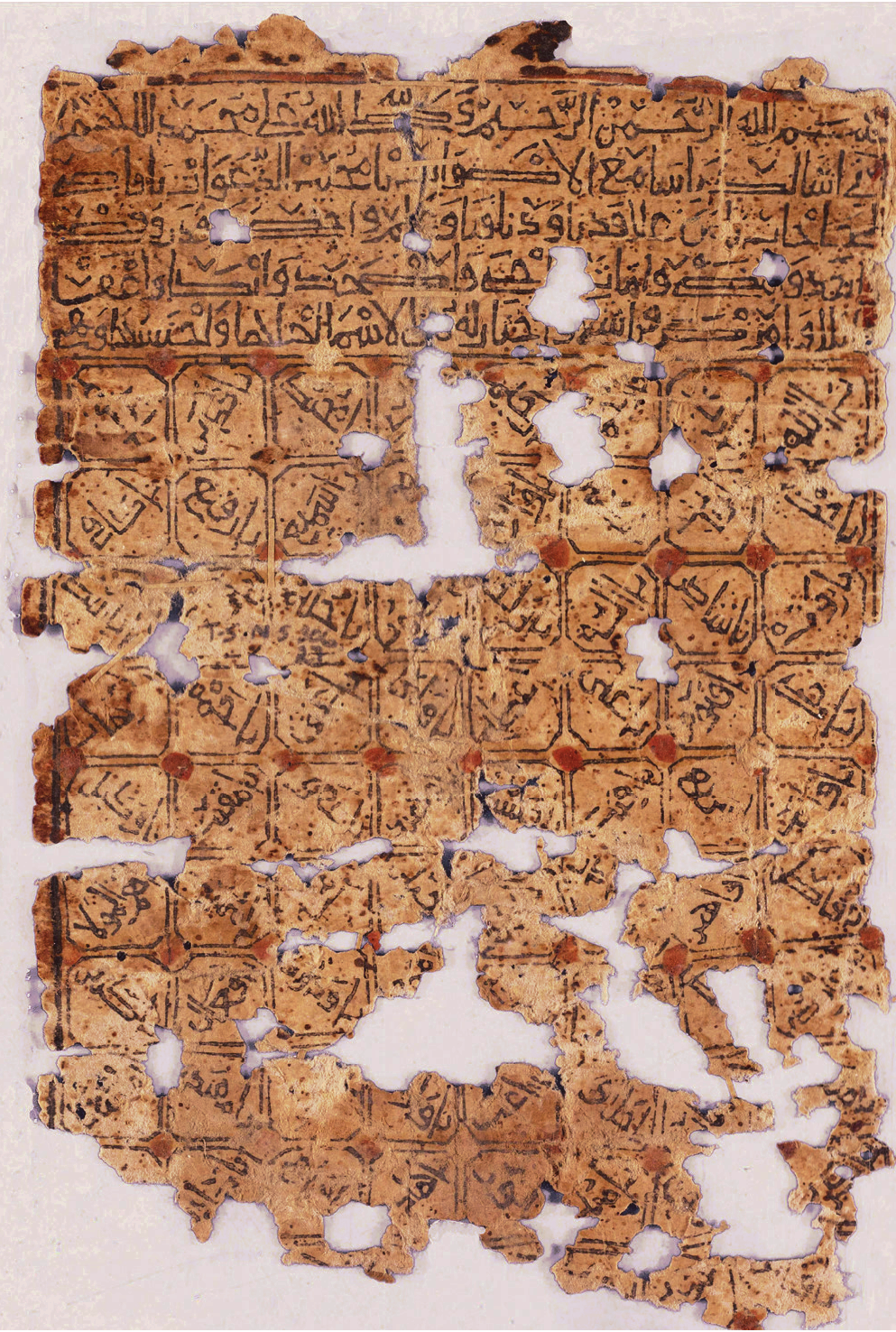
Medieval block-printed 80 cell grid of the Names of Allah

Different sources give different lists of the 99 names. The most commonly known list is based on the one found in the Jamiʿ at-Tirmidhi (9th century) that was narrated by al-Walid ibn Muslim, which is the most commonly known. However, al-Tirmidhi comments on his list: "This (version of the) hadith is gharib [unusual]; it has been narrated from various routes on the authority of Abu Hurayrah, but we do not know of the mention of the Names in the numerous narrations, except this one." Other hadiths, such as those of al-Bukhari, Sahih Muslim, Ibn Majah, al-Hakim al-Tirmidhi or Ibn ʿAsākir, have variant lists. Various early Muslim exegetes, including Jaʿfar al-Sadiq, Sufyan ibn `Uyaynah, Ibn Hazm, al-Qurtubi, and Ibn Hajar al-Asqalani, have given their own versions of lists of 99 names.

=== al-Tirmidhi's list ===
Pronunciation	Classical Arabic (Quranic/ classical written forms)	Romanization	Translation	Quranic Reference
1	اَلرَّحْمَـٰنِ	ar-Raḥmān	Merciful/ The Beneficent/ All-Compassionate/ Gracious/	Quran: 113 times paired with ar-Rahīm at beginning of Surahs (chapters), and 55 additional places mostly by itself/ unpaired.
2	اَلرَّحِيْمُ	ar-Raḥīm	The Merciful / Merciful / Clement.	Quran: 113 times paired with ar-Rahmān at beginning of Surahs (chapters), and 115 additional places often paired with al-Ghafūr, at-Tawwāb, ar-Raʾūf
3	اَلْمَلِكُ	al-Malik	The King/ Sovereign/ Dominion/ Possessor (of the Throne of God).	^{[Quran 59:23]}, 59:23, 20:114, 23:116
4	اَلْقُدُّوسُ	al-Quddūs	The Holy/ All-Holy/ All-Pure/ Sacred/ All-Sacred	^{[Quran 62:1]}
5	ٱلسَّلَامُ	as-Salām	Peace/ Calm/ Ever-Tranquil	^{[Quran 59:23]}
6	ٱلْمُؤْمِنُ	al-Muʾmin	The Granter of Security/ the Giver/ Faith/ Supreme Believer (of Belief)/ Giver of Belief	^{[Quran 59:23]}
7	ٱلْمُهَيْمِنُ	al-Muhaymin	The Controller/ Absolute Authority Over All/ Guardian Over All/ Absolute Master/ Over Dominion Eternal	^{[Quran 59:23]}
8	ٱلْعَزِيزُ	al-ʿAzīz	The Exalted in Might and Power/ Exalted/ Powerful/ Almighty/ Mighty	^{[Quran 4:158]},^{[Quran 9:40]}, ^{[Quran 48:7]}, ^{[Quran 59:23]}... often paired as al-Aziz al-Hakim, 2:1293:6,3:18,3:62, 5:11814:4 57:1,59:160:5,61:1, 62:3, and al-Aziz al-Rahim,26:9,30:5,32:6,44:42
9	ٱلْجَبَّارُ	al-Jabbār	The Omnipotent/ Supreme Power/ Possessor of Having All Power/ Strong	^{[Quran 59:23]}
10	ٱلْمُتَكَبِّرُ	al-Mutakabbir	Supreme / Justly Proud by himself	^{[Quran 59:23]}
11	ٱلْخَالِقُ	al-Khāliq	The Creator/ Creator of the Universe/ Maker/ True Originator/ Absolute Author	^{[Quran 6:102]}, ^{[Quran 13:16]}, ^{[Quran 36:81]}, ^{[Quran 40:62]}, ^{[Quran 59:24]}
12	ٱلْبَارِئُ	al-Bāriʾ	The Initiator/ Evolver/ Eternal Spirit Worshipped By All, Have Absolute Power Over All Matters, Nature and Events	^{[Quran 59:24]}
13	ٱلْمُصَوِّرُ	al-Muṣawwir	The Fashioner/ Shaper/ Designer/ Artist	^{[Quran 59:24]}
14	ٱلْغَفَّارُ	al-Ghaffār	The Repeatedly Forgiving/ Absolute Forgiver/ Pardoner/ Condoner [He Who is Ready to Pardon and Forgive]	^{[Quran 38:66]}, ^{[Quran 39:5]}, ^{[Quran 40:42]}, ^{[Quran 71:10]}
15	ٱلْقَهَّارُ	al-Qahhār	The Subduer/ Overcomer/ Conqueror/ Absolute Vanquisher [Possessor of Who Subdues Evil and Oppression]	12:39, 13:16, 14:48, 38:65, 39:4, 40:16
16	ٱلْوَهَّابُ	al-Wahhāb	The Absolute Bestower/ Giver/ Grantor/ Great Donor	38:9, 38:35
17	ٱلرَّزَّاقُ	ar-Razzāq	The Provider/ Sustainer/ Bestower of Sustenance/ All-Provider	51:58
18	ٱلْفَتَّاحُ	al-Fattāḥ	The Opener/ Opener of the Gates of Profits/ Reliever/ The Victory Giver	34:26
19	ٱلْعَلِيمُ	al-ʿAlīm	The Knowing/ All-Knower/ Omniscient/ All-Knowledgeable/ Possessor of Knowing Much of Ever Thing/ All-Knowing	2:158, 3:92, 4:35, 24:41, 33:40
20	ٱلْقَابِضُ	al-Qābiḍ	The Restrainer/ Withholder/ Straightener/ Absolute Seizer	2:245
21	ٱلْبَاسِطُ	al-Bāsiṭ	The Extender/ Expander/ Generous Provider	2:245
22	ٱلْخَافِضُ	al-Khāfiḍ	The Abaser/ Humiliator/ Downgrader [Possessor of Giving Comfort, Free from Pain Anxiety or Troubles]	56:3; al-Kafʿamī (1992:38)
23	ٱلرَّافِعُ	ar-Rāfiʿ	The Exalter/ Upgrader [of Ranks]	58:11, 6:83
24	ٱلْمُعِزُّ	al-Muʿizz	The Giver of Honor/ Bestower of Honor/ Empowerer	3:26
25	ٱلْمُذِلُّ	al-Muḏill	The Giver of Dishonor/ the Giver of Disgrace	3:26
26	ٱلسَّمِيعُ	as-Samīʿ	The Hearing/ All-Hearing/ Hearer of Invocation	2:127, 2:256, 8:17, 49:1
27	ٱلْبَصِيرُ	al-Baṣīr	The All-Seeing/ All-Seer/ Ever-Clairvoyant/ Clear-Sighted/ Clear-Seeing	4:58, 17:1, 42:11, 42:27
28	ٱلْحَكَمُ	al-Ḥakam	The Judge/ Arbitrator/ Arbiter/ All-Decree/ Possessor of Authority of Decisions and Judgment	22:69
29	ٱلْعَدْلُ	al-ʿAdl	The Just/ Authorized and Straightforward Judge of Dealing Justly	6:115
30	ٱللَّطِيفُ	al-Laṭīf	The Gentle/ Benignant/ Subtly Kind/ All-Subtle	22:63, 31:16, 33:34
31	ٱلْخَبِيرُ	al-Khabīr	The All-Aware/ Well-Acquainted/ Ever-Adept	6:18, 17:30, 49:13, 59:18
32	ٱلْحَلِيمُ	al-Ḥalīm	The Forbearing/ Indulgent/ Oft Forbearing/ All-Enduring	2:235, 17:44, 22:59, 35:41
33	ٱلْعَظِيمُ	al-ʿAẓīm	The Most Great/ Ever-Magnificent/ Most Supreme/ Exalted/ Absolute Dignified	2:255, 42:4, 56:96
34	ٱلْغَفُورُ	al-Ghafūr	The Ever-Forgiving/ Oft-Forgiving	2:173, 8:69, 16:110, 41:32
35	ٱلشَّكُورُ	ash-Shakūr	The Grateful/ Appreciative/ Multiplier of Rewards	35:30, 35:34, 42:23, 64:17
36	ٱلْعَلِيُّ	al-ʿAliyy	The Sublime/ Ever-Exalted/ Supreme/ Most High/ Most Lofty	4:34, 31:30, 42:4, 42:51 34:23
37	ٱلْكَبِيرُ	al-Kabīr	The Great/ Ever-Great/ Grand/ Most Great/ Greatly Abundant of Extent, Capacity and Importance	13:9, 22:62, 31:30, 34:23
38	ٱلْحَفِيظُ	al-Ḥafīẓ	The Preserver/ Ever-Preserving/ All-Watching/ Protector/ Guardian/ Oft-Conservator	11:57, 34:21, 42:6
39	ٱلْمُقِيتُ	al-Muqīt	The Nourisher/ Feeder	4:85
40	ٱلْحَسِيبُ	al-Ḥasīb	The Bringer of Judgment/ Ever-Reckoner [the One Who Takes Account of All Matters]	4:6, 4:86, 33:39
41	ٱلْجَلِيلُ	al-Jalīl	The Majestic/ Exalted/ Oft-Important/ Splendid	55:27, 7:143
42	ٱلْكَرِيمُ	al-Karīm	The Noble/ Bountiful/ Generous/ Precious/ Honored/ Benefactor	27:40, 82:6
43	ٱلرَّقِيبُ	ar-Raqīb	The Watchful/ Observer/ Ever-Watchful/ Watcher	4:1, 5:117
44	ٱلْمُجِيبُ	al-Mujīb	The Responsive/ Answerer/ Supreme Answerer/ Accepter of Invocation	11:61
45	ٱلْوَاسِعُ	al-Wāsiʿ	The Vast/ All-Embracing/ Omnipresent/ Boundless/ All-Encompassing	2:268, 3:73, 5:54
46	ٱلْحَكِيمُ	al-Ḥakīm	The Wise/ Ever-Wise/ Endowed with Sound Judgment	97 times, often paired, mostly al-Aziz al-Hakim, 2:129,3:6,3:18,3:625:11814:431:27,46:2, 57:1,59:1, 60:5, 61:1, 62:3, and al-Aleem al-Hakim,12:6, 22:52, 48:4, 49:8, 60:10, 66:2
47	ٱلْوَدُودُ	al-Wadūd	The Affectionate/ Ever-Affectionate/ Loving One/ Loving/ the Lover/ the One Who Tenders and Warm Hearts	11:90, 85:14
48	ٱلْمَجِيدُ	al-Majīd	The All-Glorious/ Majestic/ Ever-Illustrious [Oft-Brilliant in Dignity, Achievements or Actions]	11:73
49	ٱلْبَاعِثُ	al-Bāʿiṯ	The Resurrector/ Awakener/ Arouser/ Dispatcher	22:7
50	ٱلشَّهِيدُ	ash-Shahīd	The Witness/ Testifier/ Ever-Witnessing	4:166, 22:17, 41:53, 48:28
51	ٱلْحَقُّ	al-Ḥaqq	The Truth/ Reality/ the Only One Certainly Sound and Genuine in Truth	6:62, 22:6, 23:116, 24:25
52	ٱلْوَكِيلُ	al-Wakīl	The Trustee, The Dependable, The Advocate	3:173, 4:171, 28:28, 73:9
53	ٱلْقَوِيُّ	al-Qawiyy	The Strong	22:40, 22:74, 42:19, 57:25
54	ٱلْمَتِينُ	al-Matīn	The Firm, The Steadfast	51:58
55	ٱلْوَلِيُّ	al-Waliyy	The Friend, Helper	4:45, 7:196, 42:28, 45:19
56	ٱلْحَمِيدُ	al-Ḥamīd	The All Praiseworthy	14:8, 31:12, 31:26, 41:42
57	ٱلْمُحْصِىُ	al-Muḥsī	The Accounter, The Numberer of All	72:28, 78:29
58	ٱلْمُبْدِئُ	al-Mubdiʾ	The Originator, The Producer, The Initiator	10:34, 27:64, 29:19, 85:13
59	ٱلْمُعِيدُ	al-Muʿīd	The Restorer, The Reinstater Who Brings Back All	10:34, 27:64, 29:19, 85:13
60	ٱلْمُحْيِي	al-Muḥyī	The Giver of Life	7:158, 15:23, 30:50, 57:2
61	ٱلْمُمِيتُ	al-Mumīt	The Bringer of Death	3:156, 7:158, 15:23, 57:2
62	ٱلْحَىُّ	al-Ḥayy	The Living	2:255, 3:2, 20:111, 25:58, 40:65
63	ٱلْقَيُّومُ	al-Qayyūm	The Subsisting, The Independent	2:255, 3:2, 20:111
64	ٱلْوَاجِدُ	al-Wājid	The Perceiver, The Finder, The Unfailing	38:44
65	ٱلْمَاجِدُ	al-Mājid	The Illustrious, The Magnificent, The Glorious	85:15, 11:73; al-Kafʿamī (1992:48)
66	ٱلْوَاحِدُ	al-Wāḥid	The Unique, The Single	13:16, 14:48, 38:65, 39:4
67	ٱلْأَحَدُ	al-ʾAḥad	The One, The Indivisible	112:1
68	ٱلصَّمَدُ	aṣ-Ṣamad	The Eternal Refuge, The Everlasting Sovereign upon Whom al depend, The Absolute, The Self-Sufficient	112:2
69	ٱلْقَادِرُ	al-Qādir	The All-Powerful, He Who is able to do Everything	6:65, 46:33, 75:40
70	ٱلْمُقْتَدِرُ	al-Muqtadir	The Determiner, The Dominant	18:45, 54:42, 6:65
71	ٱلْمُقَدِّمُ	al-Muqaddim	The Expediter, He Who Brings Forward	16:61
72	ٱلْمُؤَخِّرُ	al-Muʾakhkhir	The Delayer, He Who Puts Far Away	71:4
73	ٱلْأَوَّلُ	al-ʾAwwal	The First, The Beginning-less	57:3
74	اَلْآخِرُ	al-ʾĀkhir	The Last, The Endless	57:3
75	ٱلظَّاهِرُ	aẓ-Ẓāhir	The Manifest, The Evident, The Outer	57:3
76	ٱلْبَاطِنُ	al-Bāṭin	The Hidden, The Unmanifest, The Inner	57:3
77	ٱلْوَالِي	al-Wāliy	The Patron, The Protecting Friend, The Friendly Lord	13:11
78	ٱلْمُتَعَالِي	al-Mutaʿālī	The Supremely Exalted, The Most High	13:9
79	ٱلْبَرُّ	al-Barr	The Good, The Beneficent	52:28
80	ٱلتَّوَّابُ	at-Tawwāb	The Ever-Returning, Ever-Relenting	2:128, 4:64, 49:12, 110:3
81	ٱلْمُنْتَقِمُ	al-Muntaqim	The Avenger	32:22, 43:41, 44:16
82	اَلْعَفُوُّ	al-ʿAfuww	The Pardoner, The Effacer, The Forgiver	4:43, 4:99, 4:149, 22:60, 58:2
83	اَلرَّؤُوفُ	ar-Raʾūf	The Kind, The Pitying	9:117, 57:9, 59:10
84	مَـٰلِكُ ٱلْمُلْكِ	Māliku l-Mulk	The Owner of all Sovereignty	3:26
85	ذُو ٱلْجَلَالِ وَٱلْإِكْرَامُ	Ḏhū l-Jalāli wa-l-ʾIkrām	The Owner, Lord of Majesty and Honour	55:27, 55:78
86	اَلْمُقْسِطُ	al-Muqsiṭ	The Equitable, The Requiter	3:18,5:42,57:25,5:42
87	اَلْجَامِعُ	al-Jāmiʿ	The Gatherer, The Unifier	3:9
88	ٱلْغَنيُّ	al-Ghāniyy	The Rich, The Independent	39:7, 47:38, 57:24
89	اَلْمُغْنِيُّ	al-Mughniyy	The Enricher, The Emancipator	9:28
90	اَلْمَانِعُ	al-Māniʿ	The Preventer, The Withholder, The Shielder, The Defender	See al-Kafʿamī (1992:61)
91	اَلضَّارُ	aḍ-Ḍār	The Distressor, The Harmer, The Afflictor	6:1758:10; al-Kafʿamī (1992:58)
92	اَلنَّافِعُ	an-Nāfiʿ	The Propitious, The Benefactor, The Source of Good	30:37
93	اَلنُّورُ	an-Nūr	The Light	24:35
94	اَلْهَادِي	al-Hādī	The Guide, The Way	22:54
95	اَلْبَدِيعُ	al-Badīʿ	The Originator, The Incomparable, The Unattainable, The Beautiful	2:117, 6:101
96	اَلْبَاقِي	al-Bāqī	The Immutable, The Infinite, The Everlasting	55:27; al-Kafʿamī (1992:64)
97	اَلْوَارِثُ	al-Wāriṯ	The Heir, The Inheritor of All	15:23, 57:10
98	اَلرَّشِيدُ	ar-Rashīd	The Guide to the Right Path	11:87 (Used Not referring to Allah)
99	اَلصَّبُورُ	aṣ-Ṣabūr	The Timeless, The Patient	2:153, 3:200, 103:3

Based on al-Tirmidhi's list above, the names for which there is no evidence, as specified by Sheikh Abd al-Muhsin al-Abbad, Sheikh Ibn Uthaymin, and others, are as follows:

الخافضُ، المعزُّ، المذِل، العَدْلُ، الجَلِيلُ، البَاعِثُ، المُحْصِي، المُبْدِئُ، المُعِيدُ، المُمِيتُ، الوَاجِدُ، المَاجِدُ، الوَالِي، المُقْسِط، المُغْنِي، المَانِعُ، الضَّارُّ، النَّافِعُ، البَاقِي، الرَّشِيدُ، الصَّبُور.

=== Comparisons of other lists ===
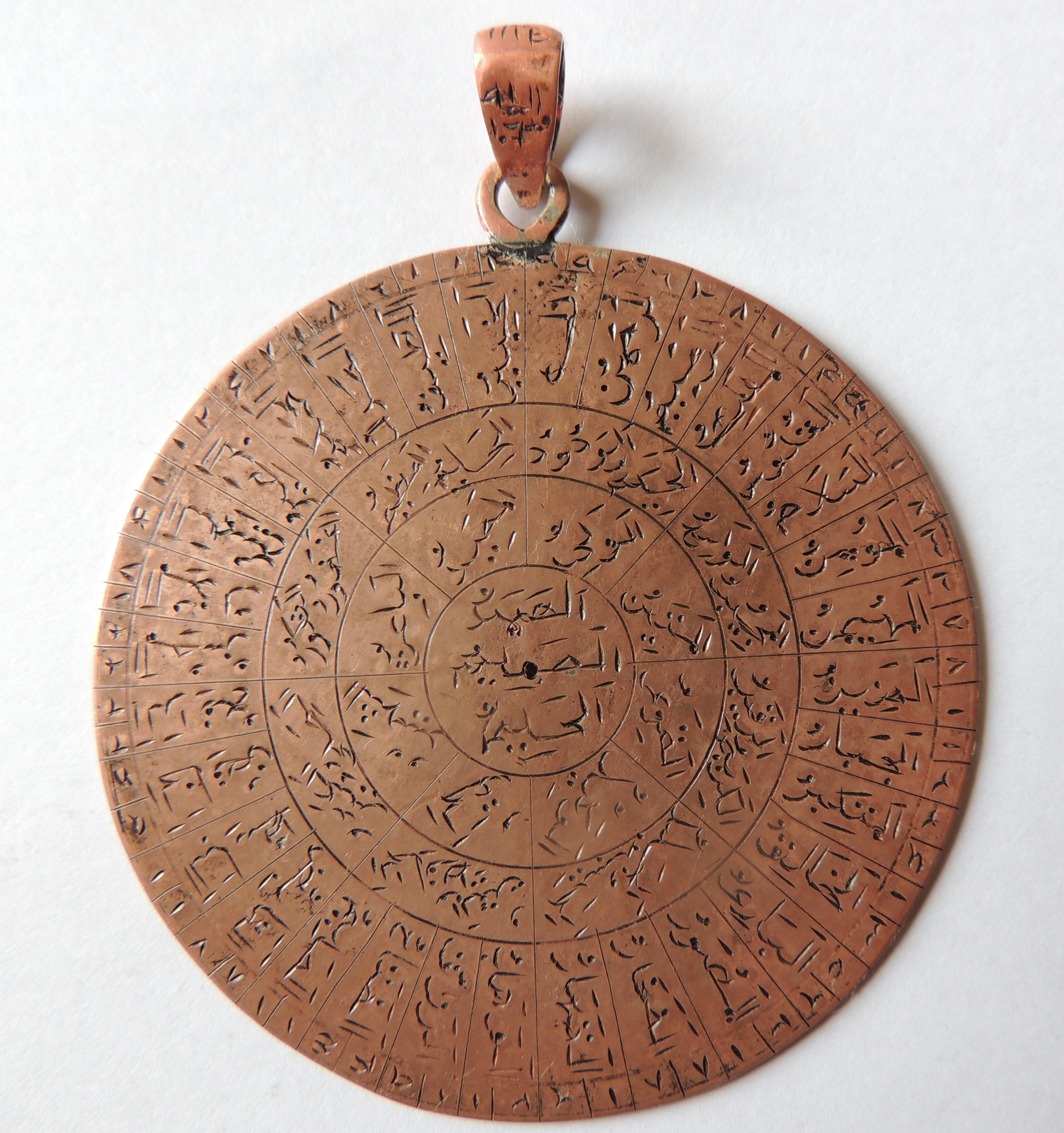
Copper Pancar Merah Talisman engraved with names of Allah, 1920-40 Martapura Indonesia

99 Names of Allah
No.	Arabic	Reference	Romanization	Translation	Narrators														
No.	Arabic	Reference	Romanization	Translation	WM	AS	AH	MD	HZ	AB	IW	IH	BH	IU	AR	AG	IN	SW	AM
1	الله	Q1:1	Allāh	God	1	1	1	1	1	1	1	1	1	1	1	1	1	1	1
2	ٱلرَّحْمَٰنُ	Q1:1	al-Raḥmān	The Most Gracious	2	2	2	2	2	2	2	2	2	2	2	2	2	2	2
3	ٱلرَّحِيمُ	Q1:1	al-Raḥīm	The Most Merciful	3	3	3	3	3	3	3	3	3	3	3	3	3	3	3
4	ٱلْمَلِكُ	Q23:116	al-Malik	The King	4	4	4	4	4	4	4	4	4	4	4	4	4	4	4
5	ٱلْقُدُّوسُ	Q59:23	al-Quddūs	The Most Holy	5	—	5	5	5	5	5	5	5	5	5	5	5	5	5
6	ٱلسَّلَامُ	Q59:23	as-Salām	The Peace	6	5	6	6	6	6	6	6	6	6	6	6	6	6	6
7	ٱلْمُؤْمِنُ	Q59:23	al-Muʾmin	The Giver of Security	7	6	7	7	7	7	7	7	7	7	7	7	7	7	7
8	ٱلْمُهَيْمِنُ	Q59:23	al-Muhaymin	The Controller	8	7	8	8	8	8	8	8	8	8	8	8	8	8	8
9	ٱلْعَزِيزُ	Q2:129	al-ʿAzīz	The Exalted in Might	9	8	9	9	9	9	9	9	9	9	9	9	9	9	9
10	ٱلْجَبَّارُ	Q59:23	al-Jabbār	The Omnipotent	10	9	10	10	10	10	10	10	10	10	10	10	10	10	10
11	ٱلْمُتَكَبِّرُ	Q59:23	al-Mutakabbir	The Superior	11	10	11	11	11	11	11	11	11	11	11	11	11	11	11
12	ٱلْخَالِقُ	Q6:102	al-Khāliq	The Creator	12	11	12	12	12	12	12	12	12	12	12	12	12	12	12
13	ٱلْبَارِئُ	Q59:23	al-Bāriʾ	The Inventor	13	12	13	13	13	13	13	13	13	13	13	13	13	13	13
14	ٱلْمُصَوِّرُ	Q59:23	al-Muṣawwir	The Designer	14	13	14	14	14	14	14	14	14	14	14	14	14	14	14
15	ٱلْغَفَّارُ	Q38:66	al-Ghaffār	The Absolute Forgiver	15	—	15	15	15	—	15	15	15	15	15	15	15	15	15
16	ٱلْقَهَّارُ	Q12:39	al-Qahhār	The Subduer	16	—	—	16	16	15	16	16	16	16	16	16	16	16	16
17	ٱلْوَهَّابُ	Q3:8	al-Wahhāb	The Bestower	17	14	16	17	17	16	17	17	17	17	17	17	17	17	17
18	ٱلرَّزَّاقُ	Q51:58	ar-Razzāq	The Provider	18	15	17	18	18	17	18	18	18	18	18	18	18	18	18
19	ٱلْفَتَّاحُ	Q34:26	al-Fattāḥ	The Opener	19	—	18	19	19	18	19	19	19	19	19	19	19	19	19
20	ٱلْعَلِيمُ	Q2:32	al-ʿAlīm	The All-Knowing	20	16	19	20	20	19	20	20	20	20	20	20	20	20	20
21	ٱلْقَابِضُ	AD(3451)	al-Qābiḍ	The Restrainer	21	17	—	21	21	20	—	—	21	21	21	21	21	21	—
22	ٱلْبَاسِطُ	AD(3451)	al-Bāsiṭ	The Expander	22	18	—	22	22	21	—	—	22	22	22	22	22	22	—
23	ٱلْخَافِضُ	Q56:3*	al-Khāfiḍ	The Humiliator	23	19	—	—	—	22	—	—	23	—	—	—	—	—	—
24	ٱلرَّافِعُ	Q56:3*	ar-Rāfiʿ	The Exalter	24	20	—	23	—	23	21	—	24	—	—	—	—	—	—
25	ٱلْمُعِزُّ	Q3:26*	al-Muʿizz	The Giver of Honor	25	21	—	24	—	24	—	—	25	—	—	—	—	—	—
26	ٱلْمُذِلُّ	Q3:26*	al-Muḏill	The Giver of Disgrace	26	22	—	25	—	25	—	—	26	—	—	—	—	—	—
27	ٱلسَّمِيعُ	Q2:127	as-Samīʿ	The All-Hearing	27	23	20	26	23	26	22	21	27	23	23	23	23	23	21
28	ٱلْبَصِيرُ	Q17:1	al-Baṣīr	The All-Seeing	28	24	21	27	24	27	23	22	28	24	24	24	24	24	22
29	ٱلْحَكَمُ	Q6:114	al-Ḥakam	The Judge	29	—	—	28	—	28	24	23	29	25	25	25	25	25	23
30	ٱلْعَدْلُ	Q16:90*	al-ʿAdl	The Just	30	—	—	29	—	29	—	—	30	—	—	—	—	—	—
31	ٱللَّطِيفُ	Q6:103	al-Laṭīf	The Gentle	31	25	22	30	25	30	25	24	31	26	26	26	26	26	24
32	ٱلْخَبِيرُ	Q6:18	al-Khabīr	The All-Aware	32	26	23	31	26	31	26	25	32	27	27	27	27	27	25
33	ٱلْحَلِيمُ	Q2:235	al-Ḥalīm	The Forbearing	33	27	24	32	27	32	27	26	33	28	28	28	28	28	26
34	ٱلْعَظِيمُ	Q2:255	al-ʿAẓīm	The Most Magnificent	34	28	25	33	28	33	28	27	34	29	29	29	29	29	27
35	ٱلْغَفُورُ	Q2:218	al-Ghafūr	The Oft-Forgiving	35	29	26	34	29	34	29	28	35	30	30	30	30	30	28
36	ٱلشَّكُورُ	Q35:30	ash-Shakūr	The Grateful	36	30	27	35	30	35	30	29	36	31	31	31	31	31	29
37	ٱلْعَلِيُّ	Q2:255	al-ʿAliyy	The Most High	37	31	28	36	31	36	31	30	37	32	32	32	32	32	30
38	ٱلْكَبِيرُ	Q13:9	al-Kabīr	The Most Great	38	—	29	37	32	37	32	31	38	33	33	33	33	33	31
39	ٱلْحَفِيظُ	Q11:57	al-Ḥafīẓ	The Protector	39	—	—	38	—	38	—	32	39	34	34	34	34	34	32
40	ٱلْمُقِيتُ	Q4:85	al-Muqīt	The Nourisher	40	—	—	—	—	39	33	33	40	35	35	35	35	35	33
41	ٱلْحَسِيبُ	Q4:6	al-Ḥasīb	The Ever-Reckoner	41	—	—	39	—	40	34	34	41	36	36	36	36	36	34
42	ٱلْجَلِيلُ	Q55:27*	al-Jalīl	The Majestic	42	35	30	40	—	41	—	—	42	—	—	—	—	—	—
43	الْكَرِيمُ	Q82:6	al-Karīm	The Noble	43	36	31	41	33	42	35	35	43	37	37	37	37	37	35
44	الرَّقِيبُ	Q5:117	ar-Raqīb	The Watchful	44	—	32	42	—	43	36	36	44	38	38	38	38	38	36
45	الْمُجِيبُ	Q11:61	al-Mujīb	The Answerer	45	37	33	—	34	—	37	37	45	39	39	39	39	39	37
46	الْوَاسِعُ	Q2:115	al-Wāsiʿ	The Vast	46	—	34	—	35	44	38	38	46	40	40	40	40	40	38
47	الْحَكِيمُ	Q2:32	al-Ḥakīm	The Wise	47	38	—	—	36	45	39	39	47	41	41	41	41	41	39
48	الْوَدُودُ	Q85:14	al-Wadūd	The Affectionate	48	39	35	43	37	46	40	40	48	42	42	42	42	42	40
49	الْمَجِيدُ	Q85:15	al-Majīd	The All-Glorious	49	40	36	44	38	47	41	41	49	43	43	43	43	43	41
50	الْبَاعِثُ	Q22:7*	al-Bāʿiṯ	The Resurrector	50	41	37	45	—	—	—	—	50	—	—	—	—	—	—
51	الشَّهِيدُ	Q5:117	ash-Shahīd	The Witness	51	42	38	46	—	48	42	42	51	44	44	44	44	44	42
52	الْحَقُّ	Q6:62	al-Ḥaqq	The Truth	52	43	39	47	39	49	43	43	52	45	45	45	45	45	43
53	الْوَكِيلُ	Q6:102	al-Wakīl	The Dependable	53	44	40	—	—	50	44	44	53	46	46	46	46	46	44
54	الْقَوِيُّ	Q8:52	al-Qawiyy	The Strong	54	45	—	48	40	51	45	45	54	47	47	47	47	47	45
55	الْمَتِينُ	Q51:58	al-Matīn	The Firm	55	46	—	—	41	52	46	46	55	48	48	48	48	48	46
56	الْوَلِيُّ	Q42:9	al-Waliyy	The Helper	56	47	—	49	42	53	47	47	56	49	49	49	49	49	47
57	الْحَمِيدُ	Q2:267	al-Ḥamīd	The All-Praiseworthy	57	—	41	50	43	54	48	48	57	50	50	50	50	50	48
58	الْمُحْصِي	Q72:28*	al-Muḥsī	The Accounter	58	—	—	—	—	55	—	—	58	—	—	—	—	—	—
59	الْمُبْدِئُ	Q85:13*	al-Mubdiʾ	The Initiator	59	48	42	—	—	56	—	—	59	—	—	—	—	—	—
60	الْمُعِيدُ	Q85:13*	al-Muʿīd	The Restorer	60	49	43	—	—	57	—	—	60	—	—	—	—	—	—
61	الْمُحْيِي	Q2:28	al-Muḥyī	The Giver of Life	61	50	44	51	—	58	—	49	61	—	—	—	—	—	—
62	الْمُمِيتُ	Q2:28	al-Mumīt	The Bringer of Death	62	51	45	—	—	59	—	—	62	—	—	—	—	—	—
63	الْحَيُّ	Q2:255	al-Ḥayy	The Living	63	52	46	52	44	60	49	50	63	51	51	51	51	51	49
64	الْقَيُّومُ	Q2:255	al-Qayyūm	The Independent	64	53	47	53	45	61	50	51	64	52	52	52	52	52	50
65	الْوَاجِدُ	T(3507)**	al-Wājid	The Finder	65	54	—	—	—	—	—	—	65	—	—	—	—	—	—
66	الْمَاجِدُ	T(2495)	al-Mājid	The Glorious	66	55	—	54	—	—	—	—	—	—	—	—	—	—	—
67	الْوَاحِدُ	Q12:39	al-Wāḥid	The Unique	67	56	48	55	46	62	51	52	66	53	53	53	53	53	51
68	الصَّمَدُ	Q112:2	aṣ-Ṣamad	The Self-Sufficient	68	57	49	56	47	63	52	53	67	54	54	54	54	54	52
69	الْقَادِرُ	Q6:65	al-Qādir	The All-Powerful	69	58	50	57	—	64	53	54	68	55	55	55	55	55	53
70	الْمُقْتَدِرُ	Q54:42	al-Muqtadir	The Determiner	70	—	51	58	48	65	54	55	69	56	56	56	56	56	54
71	الْمُقَدِّمُ	B(1120)	al-Muqaddim	The Expeditor	71	—	—	—	49	66	—	—	70	57	57	57	57	57	55
72	الْمُؤَخِّرُ	B(1120)	al-Muʾakhkhir	The Delayer	72	—	—	—	50	67	—	—	71	58	58	58	58	58	56
73	الْأَوَّلُ	Q57:3	al-ʾAwwal	The First	73	59	52	59	51	68	55	56	72	59	59	59	59	59	57
74	الْآخِرُ	Q57:3	al-ʾĀkhir	The Last	74	60	53	60	52	69	56	57	73	60	60	60	60	60	58
75	الظَّاهِرُ	Q57:3	aẓ-Ẓāhir	The Manifest	75	61	54	61	53	70	57	58	74	61	61	61	61	61	59
76	الْبَاطِنُ	Q57:3	al-Bāṭin	The Hidden	76	62	55	62	54	71	58	59	75	62	62	62	62	62	60
77	الْوَالِي	Q13:11	al-Wāliy	The Patron	77	63	—	—	—	—	—	—	76	—	—	—	—	—	—
78	الْمُتَعَالِ	Q13:9	al-Mutaʿāli	The Most Exalted	78	64	56	—	55	—	59	60	77	63	63	63	63	63	61
79	الْبَرُّ	Q52:28	al-Barr	The Beneficent	79	—	—	—	56	—	60	61	78	64	64	64	64	64	62
80	التَّوَّابُ	Q2:37	at-Tawwāb	The Oft-Returning	80	65	57	63	57	72	61	62	79	65	65	65	65	65	63
81	الْمُنْتَقِمُ	Q32:22	al-Muntaqim	The Avenger	81	—	—	—	—	—	62	63	—	—	—	—	—	—	—
82	الْعَفُوُّ	Q4:43	al-ʿAfuww	The Pardoner	82	66	58	64	58	73	63	64	80	66	66	66	66	66	64
83	الرَّؤُوفُ	Q2:143	ar-Raʾūf	The Kind	83	67	59	65	59	74	64	65	81	67	67	67	67	67	65
84	مَالِكُ الْمُلْكِ	Q3:26	Māliku l-Mulk	Owner of All Sovereignty	84	—	—	—	—	—	65	—	82	—	—	—	—	68	—
85	ذُو الْجَلَالِ وَالْإِكْرَامِ	Q55:27	Ḏū l-Jalāli wa-l-ʾIkrām	Owner of Majesty and Honor	85	—	60	66	—	—	66	—	83	—	—	—	—	69	—
86	الْمُقْسِطُ	T(3507)**	al-Muqsiṭ	The Requiter	86	68	—	67	—	75	67	—	84	—	—	—	—	—	—
87	الْجَامِعُ	Q3:9	al-Jāmiʿ	The Gatherer	87	69	—	68	—	76	68	66	85	—	—	—	—	—	—
88	الْغَنِيُّ	Q6:133	al-Ghāniyy	The Rich	88	70	61	69	60	77	69	67	86	68	68	68	68	70	66
89	الْمُغْنِي	Q9:28*	al-Mughniyy	The Enricher	89	—	—	—	—	—	—	—	87	—	—	—	—	—	—
90	الْمَانِعُ	M(477)*	al-Māniʿ	The Preventer	90	71	—	70	—	—	—	—	88	—	—	—	—	—	—
91	الضَّارُّ	Q6:17*	aḍ-Ḍār	The Distressor	91	72	—	—	—	78	—	—	89	—	—	—	—	—	—
92	النَّافِعُ	T(3507)**	an-Nāfiʿ	The Benefactor	92	73	—	—	—	79	—	—	90	—	—	—	—	—	—
93	النُّورُ	Q24:35	an-Nūr	The Light	93	74	62	71	—	—	—	68	91	—	—	—	—	—	—
94	الْهَادِي	Q25:31	al-Hādī	The Guide	94	75	63	72	—	80	70	69	92	—	—	69	69	71	67
95	الْبَدِيعُ	Q2:117	al-Badīʿ	The Originator	95	—	64	73	—	—	71	70	93	—	—	—	—	—	—
96	الْبَاقِي	Q55:27*	al-Bāqī	The Everlasting	96	76	65	74	—	81	—	—	94	—	—	—	—	—	—
97	الْوَارِثُ	Q15:23	al-Wāriṯ	The Inheritor	97	77	—	—	—	82	72	71	95	69	69	70	70	—	68
98	الرَّشِيدُ	Q18:10*	ar-Rashīd	The Right Guide	98	—	—	75	—	83	73	—	96	—	—	—	—	—	—
99	الصَّبُورُ	T(3507)**	aṣ-Ṣabūr	The Patient	99	—	—	76	—	84	—	—	97	—	—	—	—	—	—

=== Hidden names ===
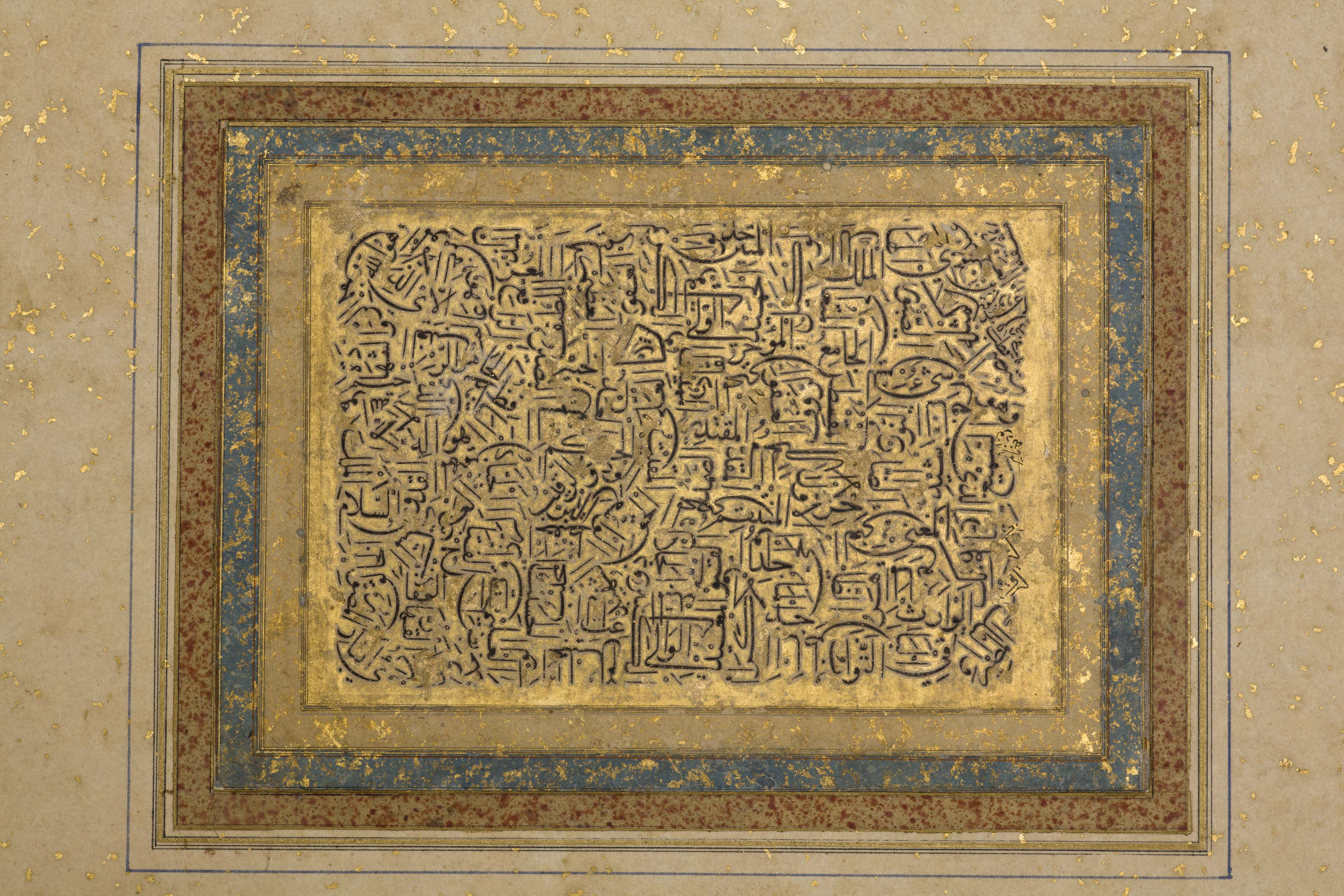
19th century calligraphy arranging the names into an intricate layout, where names with similar letter shapes are paired and mirrored against one another

There is no universal agreement among Islamic exegesis scholars about the number of names of God, since it was only Ibn Hazm who argued a limitation of 99 names. Instead, Islamic scholars such as al-Khattabi, al-Qurtubi, Abi Bakr bin Thayyib, Ibn al-'Arabi (not Ibn Arabi), (Note: Ibn al-'Arabi full Nisba name is Muhammad ibn Abdullah al-Andalusi al-Ishbili al-Maliki, a Maliki scholar who died in 1121 AD. Ibn Arabi full Nisba is Muhammad ibn Ali al-Hatimi at-Tayy al-Andalusi, a philosopher who died in 1216 AD.) Abu Abdillah ar-Razi, Ibn Taymiyya, Al-Nawawi, Ibn Hajar al-Asqalani, Ibn Qayyim al-Jawziyya and Ibn Rajab, have stated that Allah has an infinite number of names. While there are rulings that only a few names and their attributes are revealed and known in the Quran and Hadiths, the uncountably unrevealed names and their attributes are only known by Allah Himself. The basis of these rulings was the Hadith, which contains a supplication as narrated in Hisn al-Muslim:

أَسْأَلُكَ بِكُلِّ اسْمٍ هُوَ لَكَ سَمَّيْتَ بِهِ نَفْسَكَ أَوْ أَنْزَلْتَهُ فِي كِتَابِكَ أَوْ عَلَّمْتَهُ أَحَدًا مِنْ خَلْقِكَ أَوْ اسْتَأْثَرْتَ بِهِ فِي عِلْمِ الْغَيْبِ عِنْدَكَ

"I beg You by every Names that is Yours, which You have named Yourself with, or revealed in Your Book, or taught to any of Your creation, or (which you) kept them secret to Yourself in the mysterious knowledge of Yours."

— Ahmad ibn Hanbal, Ibn Hibban, Al-Hakim al-Nishapuri., Musnad Ahmad ibn Hanbal, Sahih Ibn Hibban, Al-Mustadrak ala al-Sahihayn. graded authentic by Shu'ayb al-Arna'ut.

Another Hadith contains a supplication, with multiple chains of transmitters:

اَللَّهُمَّ إِنِّيْ أَعُوْذُ بِرِضَاكَ مِنْ سَخَطِكَ، وَبِمُعَافَاتِكَ مِنْ عُقُوْبَتِكَ، وَأَعُوْذُ بِكَ مِنْكَ، لاَ أُحْصِيْ ثَنَاءً عَلَيْكَ أَنْتَ كَمَا أَثْنَيْتَ عَلَى نَفْسِكَ

“O Allah, indeed I seek refuge in Your blessing from Your wrath, and I seek refuge in Your salvation from Your torment, and I seek refuge in You from You. I cannot limit the amount of praise to You. You are as You praise Yourself."

— Ibn Majah, Muslim ibn al-Hajjaj, Sunan ibn Majah, Sahih Muslim.

In the established Islamic creed about the unrevealed names of Allah, the majority of fatwas say it is obligatory for a Muslim to believe in the existence of the unrevealed names and their attributes, but it is forbidden for Muslims to try to search for them without literal evidences from the Quran and authentic Hadiths. In the creed of Islamic eschatology, the hidden names are believed to be hidden from anyone but Allah, and will only be revealed personally to Muhammad during Judgement Day.

== In textual sources ==
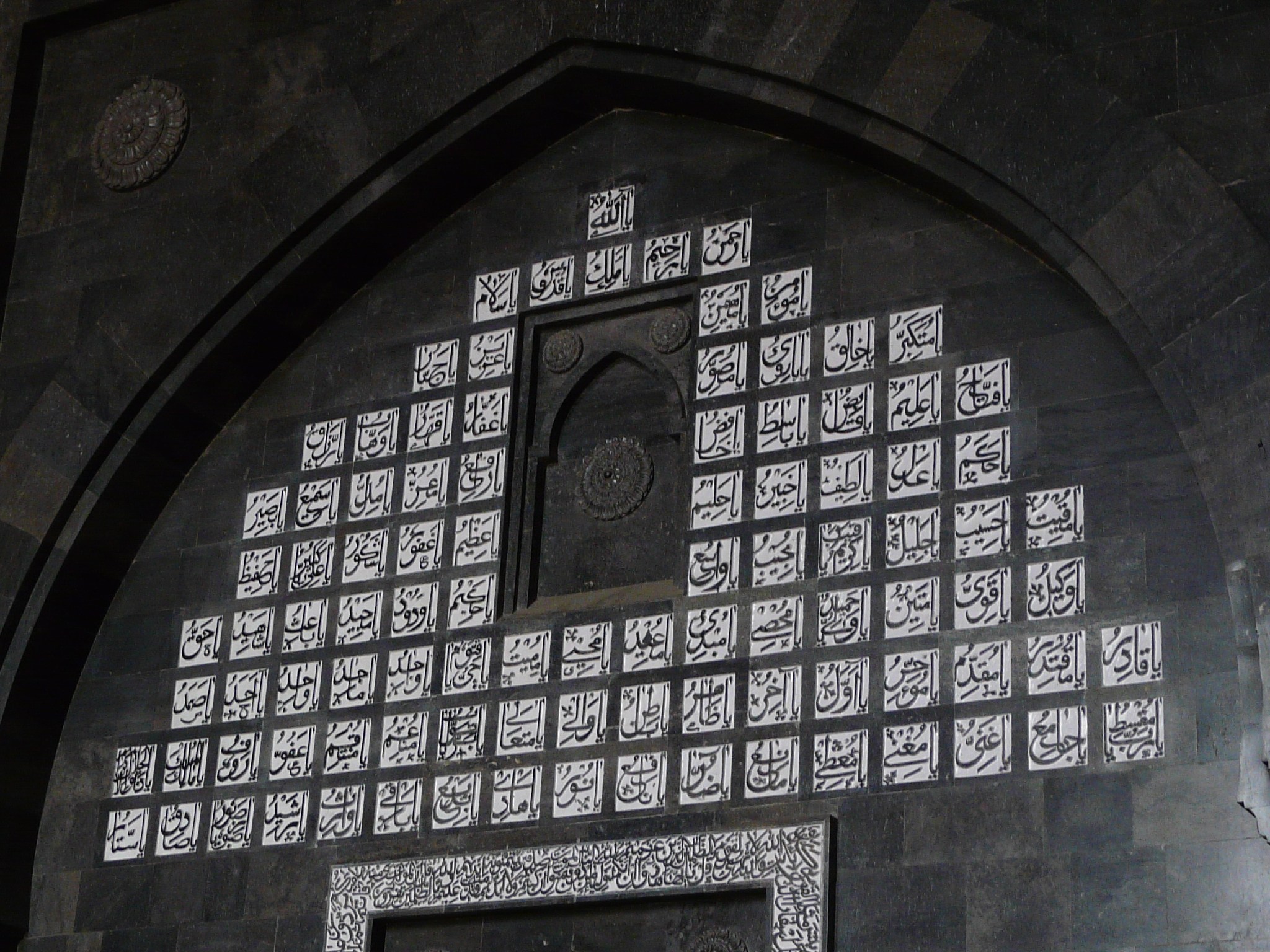
Names of Allah in the Mihrab of Jamia Masjid, Srinagar

According to Muslims, the names of God must be established by evidence and direct reference in the Quran and hadiths (the concept of tawqif). Thus, it is impermissible (haram) for Muslims to give Allah names except with what He has named Himself in the Quran or in authentic Hadiths.

=== The Quran ===
The Quran refers to God's Most Beautiful Names (al-ʾasmāʾ al-ḥusná) in several Surahs. Gerhard Böwering refers to Surah 17 (17:110) as the locus classicus to which explicit lists of 99 names used to be attached in tafsir.

قُلِ ٱدْعُوا۟ ٱللَّهَ أَوِ ٱدْعُوا۟ ٱلرَّحْمَـٰنَ ۖ أَيًّۭا مَّا تَدْعُوا۟ فَلَهُ ٱلْأَسْمَآءُ ٱلْحُسْنَىٰ ۚ وَلَا تَجْهَرْ بِصَلَاتِكَ وَلَا تُخَافِتْ بِهَا وَٱبْتَغِ بَيْنَ ذَٰلِكَ سَبِيلًۭا

Say, ˹O Prophet,˺ “Call upon Allah or call upon the Most Compassionate—whichever you call, He has the Most Beautiful Names.” Do not recite your prayers too loudly or silently, but seek a way between.

— Surah al-Isra (17), verse 110

Another verse references the Most Beautiful Names:

وَلِلَّهِ ٱلْأَسْمَآءُ ٱلْحُسْنَىٰ فَٱدْعُوهُ بِهَا ۖ وَذَرُوا۟ ٱلَّذِينَ يُلْحِدُونَ فِىٓ أَسْمَـٰٓئِهِۦ ۚ سَيُجْزَوْنَ مَا كَانُوا۟ يَعْمَلُونَ

Allah has the Most Beautiful Names. So call upon Him by them, and keep away from those who abuse His Names.1 They will be punished for what they used to do.

— Surat al-Aaraf (7), verse 110

A cluster of more than a dozen Divine epithets which are included in such lists is found in Surah 59.

هُوَ ٱللَّهُ ٱلَّذِى لَآ إِلَـٰهَ إِلَّا هُوَ ۖ عَـٰلِمُ ٱلْغَيْبِ وَٱلشَّهَـٰدَةِ ۖ هُوَ ٱلرَّحْمَـٰنُ ٱلرَّحِيمُ ٢٢ هُوَ ٱللَّهُ ٱلَّذِى لَآ إِلَـٰهَ إِلَّا هُوَ ٱلْمَلِكُ ٱلْقُدُّوسُ ٱلسَّلَـٰمُ ٱلْمُؤْمِنُ ٱلْمُهَيْمِنُ ٱلْعَزِيزُ ٱلْجَبَّارُ ٱلْمُتَكَبِّرُ ۚ سُبْحَـٰنَ ٱللَّهِ عَمَّا يُشْرِكُونَ ٢٣ هُوَ ٱللَّهُ ٱلْخَـٰلِقُ ٱلْبَارِئُ ٱلْمُصَوِّرُ ۖ لَهُ ٱلْأَسْمَآءُ ٱلْحُسْنَىٰ ۚ يُسَبِّحُ لَهُۥ مَا فِى ٱلسَّمَـٰوَٰتِ وَٱلْأَرْضِ ۖ وَهُوَ ٱلْعَزِيزُ ٱلْحَكِيمُ ٢٤

He is Allāh—there is no god ˹worthy of worship˺ except Him: 'Ālim al-ghayb wa'l-shāhadah (Knower of the seen and unseen). He is ar-Raḥmān (the Most Compassionate), ar-Raḥīm (the Most Merciful). He is Allāh—there is no god except Him: al-Malik (the King), al-Quddūs (the Most Holy), as-Salām (the All-Perfect), al-Muʾmin (the Source of Serenity), al-Muhaymin (the Watcher), al-ʿAzīz (the Almighty), al-Jabbār (the Supreme in Might), al-Mutakabbir (the Majestic). Glorified is Allāh far above what they associate with Him. He is Allāh: al-Khāliq (the Creator), al-Bāriʾ (the Inventor), al-Muṣawwir (the Shaper). He ˹alone˺ has the Most Beautiful Names. Whatever is in the heavens and the earth ˹constantly˺ glorifies Him. And He is al-ʿAzīz (the Almighty), al-Ḥakīm (All-Wise).

— Surah al-Hashr (59), verses 22–24

=== Hadith ===
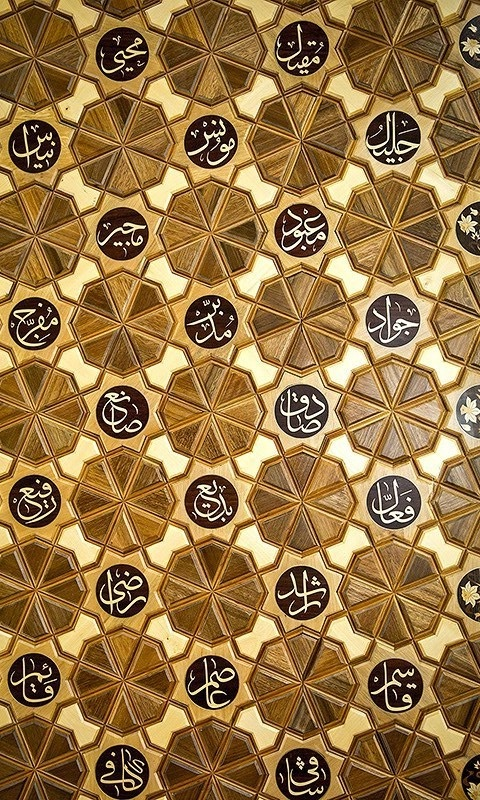
Names of Allah in Al Askari Mosque

In a hadith narrated by Sahih al-Bukhari, it is mentioned that Allah has 99 names.

Abu Hurairah reported that God has ninety-nine Names, i.e., one hundred minus one, and whoever believes in their meanings and acts accordingly, will enter Paradise; and God is witr (one) and loves 'the witr' (i.e., odd numbers).

— Sahih Bukhari, Vol. 8, Book 75, Hadith 419

In another hadith, this fact is also mentioned again.

Allah's Messenger (ﷺ) said, "God has ninety-nine Names, one-hundred less one; and he who memorized them all by heart will enter Paradise." To count something means to know it by heart.

— Sahih Bukhari, Vol. 9, Book 93, Hadith 489

== Sufi mysticism ==
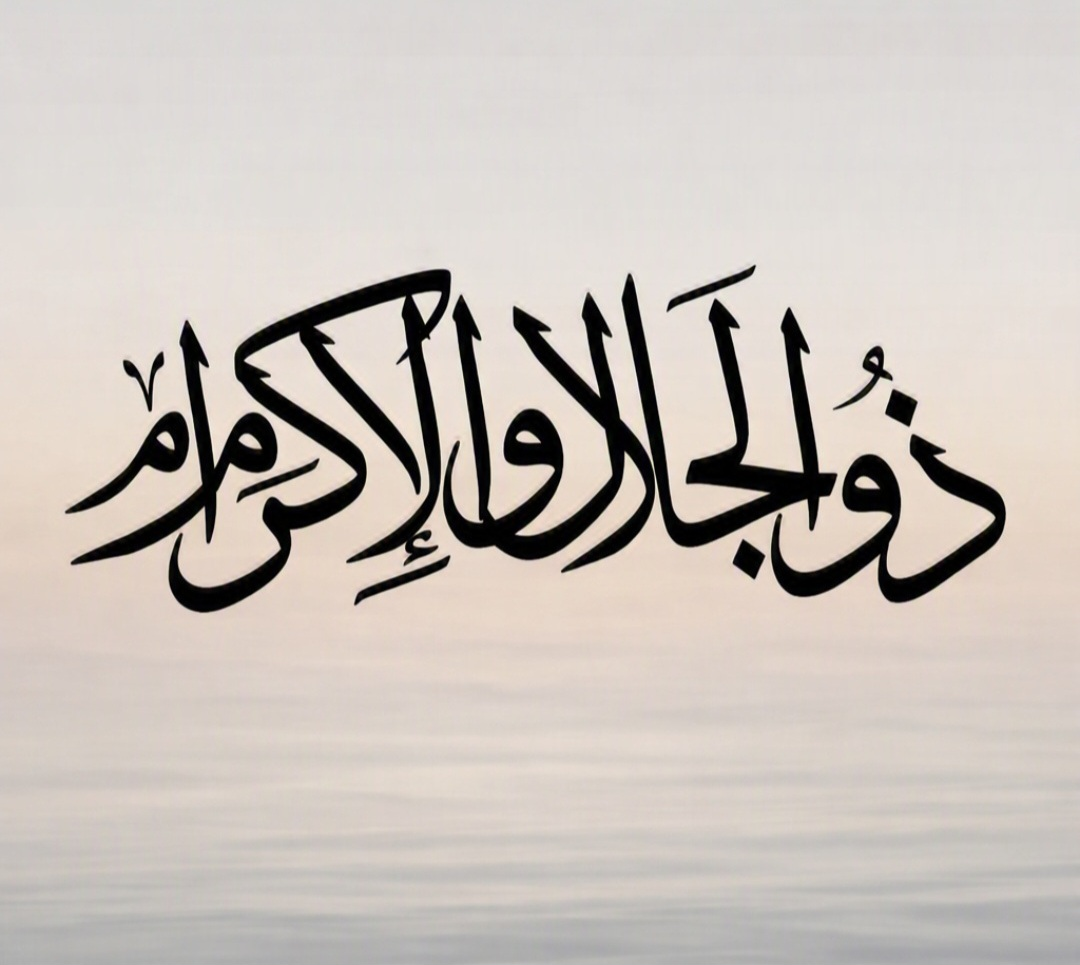
Dhul Jalāli wal Ikrām, Owner of Majesty and Honor

Al-Ḥayy, The Ever-Living

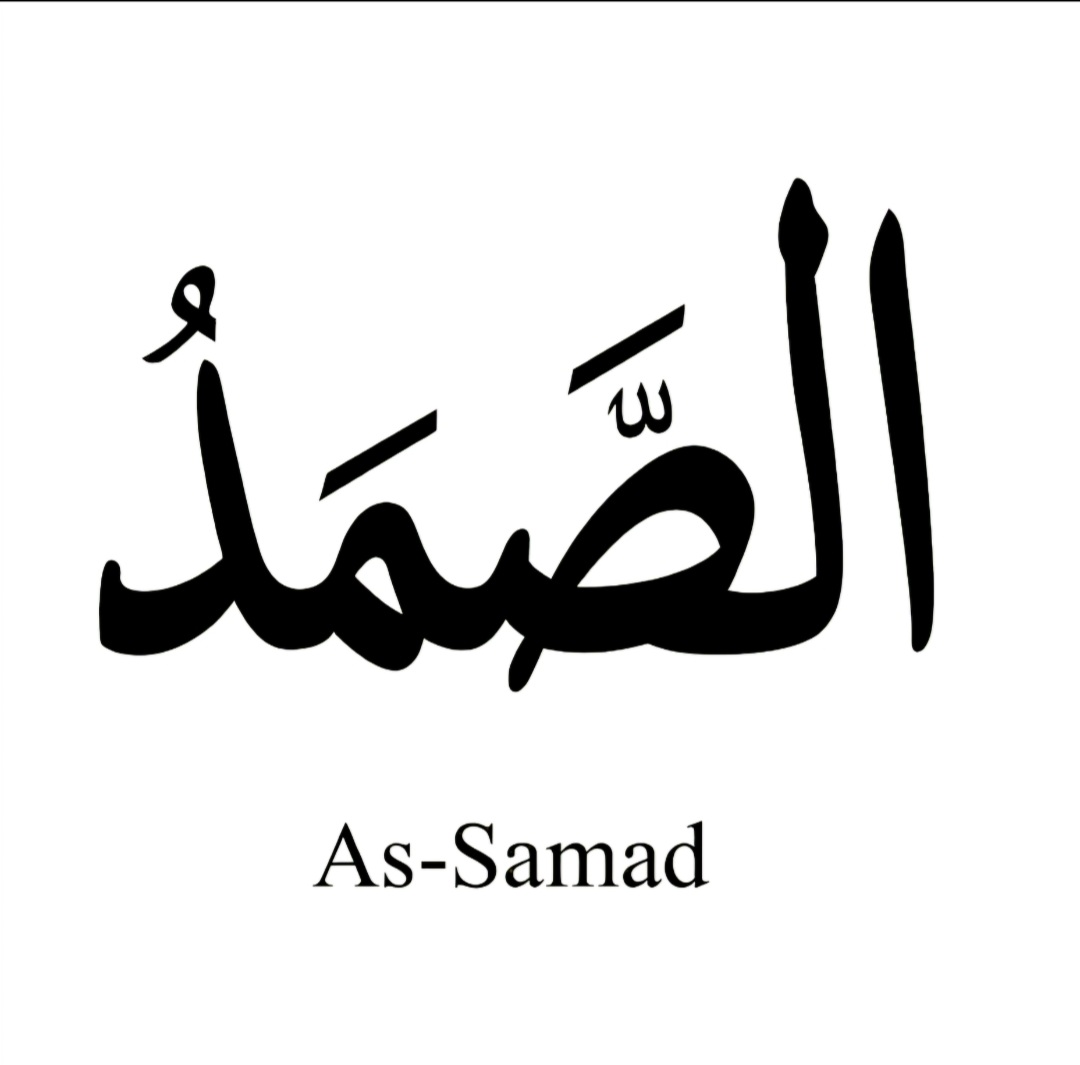
As-Samad, The Everlasting Sovereign and Refuge

Similar to the mainstream Sunnis, there is a tradition among the followers of Sufism to the effect the 99 names of God point to a mystical "Most Supreme and Superior Name" (ismu l-ʾAʿẓam (الاسْمُ ٱلْأَعْظَم). This "Greatest Name of God" is said to be "the one which if He is called (prayed to) by it, He will answer." More than 1000 names of God are listed in the Jawshan Kabir (جَوْشَنُ ٱلْكَبِير—literally "the Great Cuirass") invocations. Sufi mystic Ibn Arabi surmised that the 99 names are "outward signs of the universe's inner mysteries".

Ibn Arabi (26 July 1165 – 16 November 1240) did not interpret the names of God as mere epithets, but as actual attributes paring the universe both in created and possible forms. By these names, the divine traits disclose for humans, whose divine potential is hidden, can learn to become a reflection of such names. However, such reflections are limited; the divine traits do not equal the divine essence of the names. Influenced by the metaphysical teachings of Ibn Arabi, Haydar Amuli assigned angels to the different names of God. Accordingly, the good angels as a whole are a manifestation of God's Names of Beauty. Shaitan (shayatin) on the other hand are a manifestation of God's Names of majesty, such as "The Haughty".

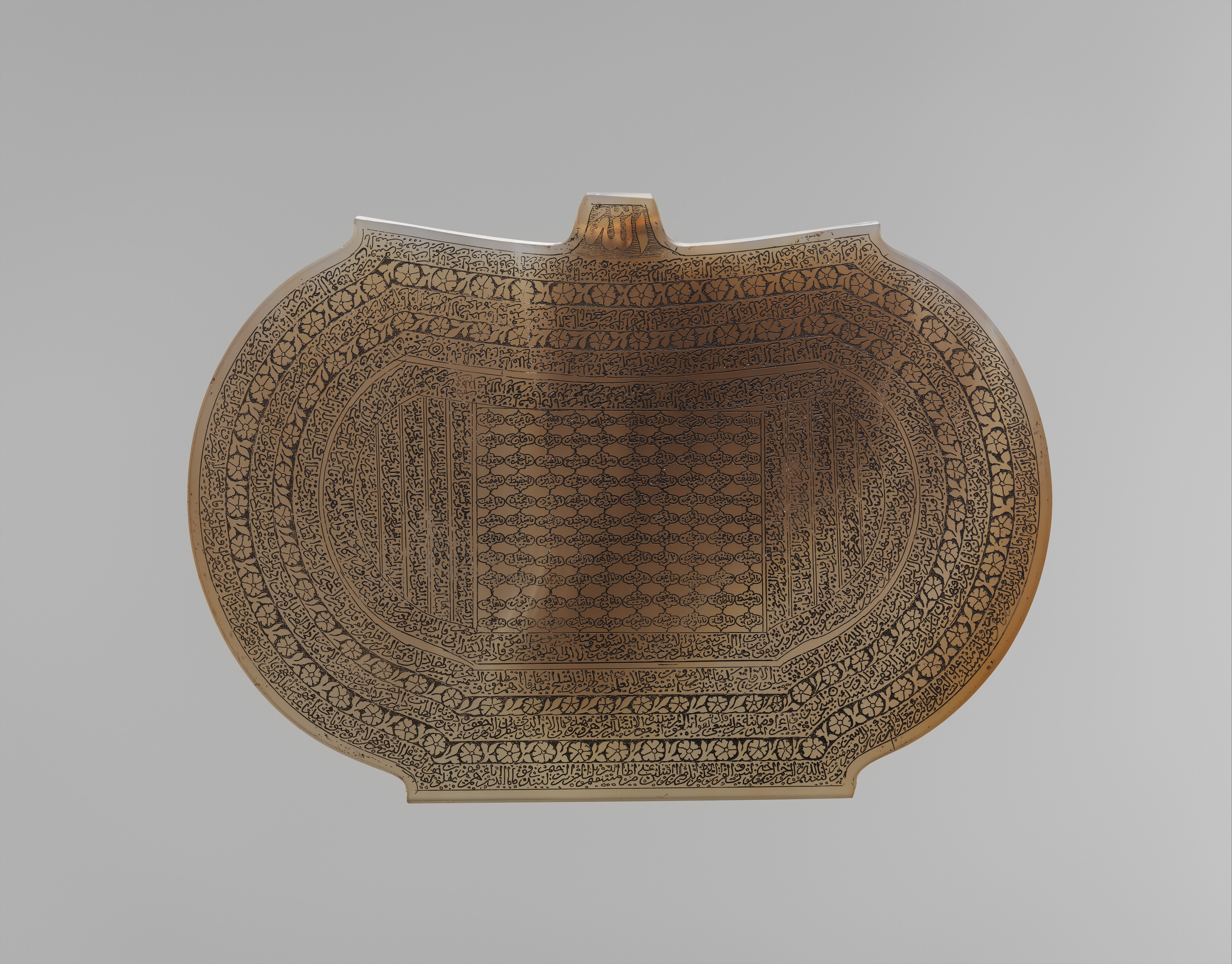
Agate Pendant with 99 names of Allah, mid-18th century

== Theophoric given names ==
The Arabic names of God are used to form theophoric given names commonly used in Muslim cultures throughout the world, mostly in Arabic speaking societies.

Because the names of God themselves are reserved to God and their use as a person's given name is considered religiously inappropriate, theophoric names are formed by either prefixing the term ˁabd (عَبْدُ: "slave/servant of") to the name (in the case of masculine names) or by dropping the definite article al (ال).

This distinction is established out of respect for the sanctity of Divine names, which denote attributes (of love, kindness, mercy, compassion, justice, power, etc.) that are believed to be possessed in a full and absolute sense only by God, while human beings, being limited creatures, are viewed by Muslims as being endowed with the Divine attributes only in a limited and relative capacity. The prefixing of the definite article would indicate that the bearer possesses the corresponding attribute in an exclusive sense, a trait reserved to God.

Quranic verse 3:26 is cited as evidence against the validity of using Divine names for persons, with the example of Mālik ul-Mulk (مَـٰلِكُ ٱلْمُلْكُ: "Lord of Power" or "Owner of all Sovereignty"):

Say: "O God! Lord of Power, You give power to whom You please, and You strip off power from whom You please. You endue with honour whom You please, and You bring low whom You please. In Your hand is all Good." Verily, over all things You have power.

— Quran 3:26

The two parts of the name starting with ˁabd may be written separately (as in the previous example) or combined as one in the transliterated form; in such a case, the vowel transcribed after ˁabdu is often written as u when the two words are transcribed as one: e.g., Abdur-Rahman, Abdul-Aziz, Abdul-Jabbar, or even Abdullah (عَبْدُ ٱللّٰه: "Servant of God"). (This has to do with Arabic case vowels, the final u vowel showing the normal "quote" nominative case form.)

Examples of Muslim theophoric names include:

- Raḥmān, such as Abdul-Raḥman Al-Sudais (عَبْدُ ٱلْرَّحْمَان ٱلْسُّدَيْس): Imam of the Grand Mosque of Makkah, KSA
- Salām, such as Salam Fayyaḍ (سَلَام فَيَّاض): Palestinian politician
- Jabbār, such as Kareem Abdul-Jabbar (كَرِيم عَبْدُ ٱلْجَبَّار): American basketball player
- Ḥakīm, such as Sherman "Abdul Ḥakim" Jackson (عَبْدُ ٱلْحَكِيم—ˁabdu ʼl-Ḥakiym): American Islamic Studies scholar
- Ra'ūf, such as Ra'ouf Mus'ad (رَؤُوف مُسَعد): Egyptian-Sudanese novelist
- Abdul Muqtedar as in Muḥammad Abdul Muqtedar Khan (مُحَمَّد عَبْدُ ٱلمُقْتَدِر خَان): Indian-American academic

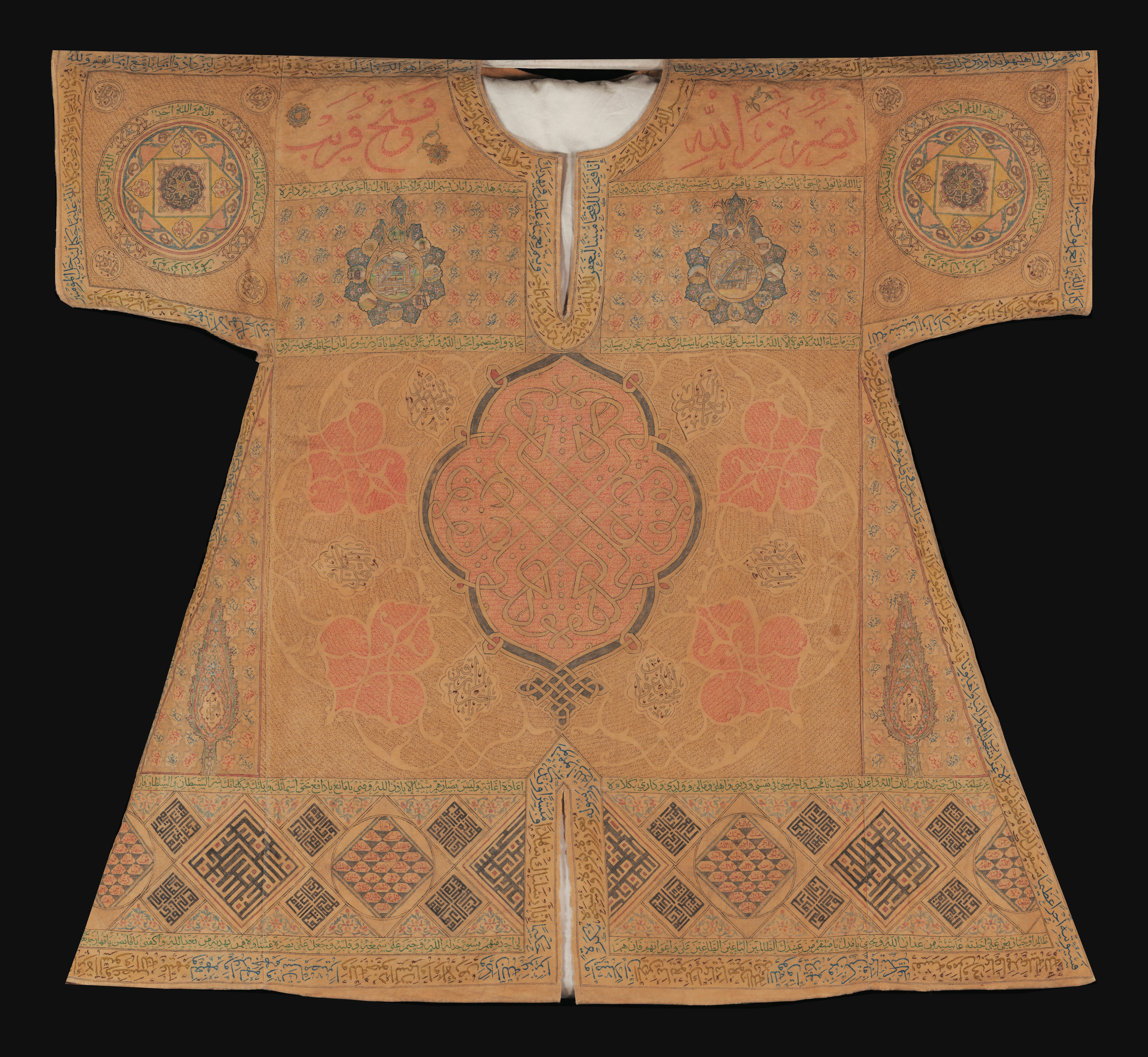
Talismanic shirt inscribed with the 99 names of God as well as Quranic verses and prayers, Turkey, 17th century, Khalili Collection of Hajj and the Arts of Pilgrimage.

== Use in Baháʼí sources ==
Baháʼí sources state that the 100th name was revealed as "Baháʼ" (Arabic: بهاء "glory, splendor"), which appears in the words Bahá'u'lláh and Baháʼí. They also believe that it is the greatest name of God. The Báb wrote a noted pentagram-shaped tablet with 360 morphological derivation of the word "Baháʼ" used in it.

According to Baháʼí scholar ‘Abdu’l-Hamíd Ishráq-Khávari, Bahāʾ al-dīn al-ʿĀmilī adopted the Persian poetic pen name "Bahāʾ" after being inspired by the words of the fifth Twelver Imam, Muhammad al-Baqir, and the sixth Imam, Ja'far al-Sadiq, who stated that the greatest name of God was included in either the Duʿāʾu l-Bahāʾ, a dawn prayer for Ramadan, or the ʾAʿmal ʿam Dawūd. In the first verse of the duʿāʾu l-Bahāʾ, the name "Bahāʾ" appears four times.

== See also ==
- The 99, a comic book based on the 99 names of God in Islam
- Basmala
- List of Arabic theophoric names
- Names of God
- Names of God in Zoroastrianism
- Names of God in Christianity
- Names of God in Judaism
- Names of God in Sikhism
- Sahasranama, the Hindu lists of 1,000 names of God
- "The Nine Billion Names of God", a short story by Arthur C. Clarke

== Appendix ==
=== Bibliography ===
- ʾIbrahīm bin ʿAlī al-Kafʿamī (1436–1500 CE), al-Maqām al-asnā fī tafsīr al-asmāʼ al-ḥusnā. Beirut: Dār al-Hādī (1992) (WorldCat listing).
- Namira Nahouza (2009), Contemporary Wahhabism Rebranded as Salafism: The Issue of Interpreting the Qur'anic Verses and Hadith on the Attributes of God and its Significance, University of Exeter
