= Ghafir =

40th chapter of the Qur'an

Surah 40 of the Quran
غافر Ghāfir The Forgiver
- Qira'ah; English text
- Classification: Meccan
- Alternate titles (Ar.): (Sūrat al-Muʼmin) سورة المؤمن
- Other names: The Forgiving One, The Believer, Forgiving
- Position: Juzʼ 24
- No. of verses: 85
- No. of Rukus: 9
- No. of words: 1226
- No. of letters: 5108

Ghafir (Arabic: غافر, ghāfir; meaning: "The All-Forgiving", referring to God), also known as Al-Muʼmin (Arabic: المؤمن, ’al-mu’min; meaning: The Believer), is the 40th chapter (sūrah) of the Qur'an, with 85 verses (āyāt). It takes its name from verse 28, which mentions a distinguished believer from among the clan of the Pharaoh who supported Moses, referring to him as a "believing man", hence al-Mu'min; The Believer. This surah is also often called al-Ghafir (the All-Forgiving) because of the Divine Name mentioned in verse 3.

Regarding the timing and contextual background of the revelation (asbāb al-nuzūl), it is traditionally believed to be a Meccan surah, from the second Meccan period (615–619).

== Summary ==
- 1–3 The Quran a revelation from the only true God
- 4 It is denied by none but unbelievers
- 4–6 Confederated infidels, however prosperous, are doomed
- 7–9 The angels intercede for true believers
- 10–12 Infidels shall repent in hell, but in vain
- 13–15 God to be worshipped as the Supreme Being
- 16–18 Judgement Day shall come suddenly
- 19–21 Ungodly men shall have no intercessor
- 22–23 Former infidels destroyed to warn those coming after
- 24–25 Moses called a sorcerer and a liar
- 26–27 He and his followers persecuted by Pharaoh and his people
- 28 Moses takes refuge in the Lord
- 29–30 A true believer espouses the cause of Moses
- 31–37 He warns Pharaoh and his people against unbelief
- 38–39 Pharaoh orders a tower to be built up to heaven
- 40 Pharaoh regards Moses as a liar
- 41–47 The true believer exhorts the Egyptians to believe in the God of Moses
- 48 God delivers the true believer from the devices of Pharaoh and his people
- 49 Pharaoh and his people condemned to hell-fire
- 50–53 Infidels shall reproach each other in hell, and call on their keepers for help in vain
- 54–55 God assists his apostles in this world and in the next
- 56 Moses received the Book of the Law
- 57 The creation of the heavens and the earth is certainly greater than the re-creation of humankind, but most people do not know
- 58 Muhammad to fly for refuge to God against proud infidels
- 59 God manifested to creation, but few men understand
- 60 The righteous and the evil not equal
- 61 The judgment-day sure to come
- 62 Rejectors of God shall be rejected
- 63–66 The true God rejected by ungrateful men
- 67–68 The true God alone to be worshipped
- 69–70 God the Sovereign Creator of all things
- 71–76 The miserable lot of those who reject the Scriptures
- 77 Muhammad to persevere patiently
- 78 No apostle ever wrought miracles without God's permission
- 79–81 God revealed in his works of providence
- 82–83 Former infidels were destroyed for their unbelief
- 84–85 They all repented when too late to avail
