= Names of God in Judaism =

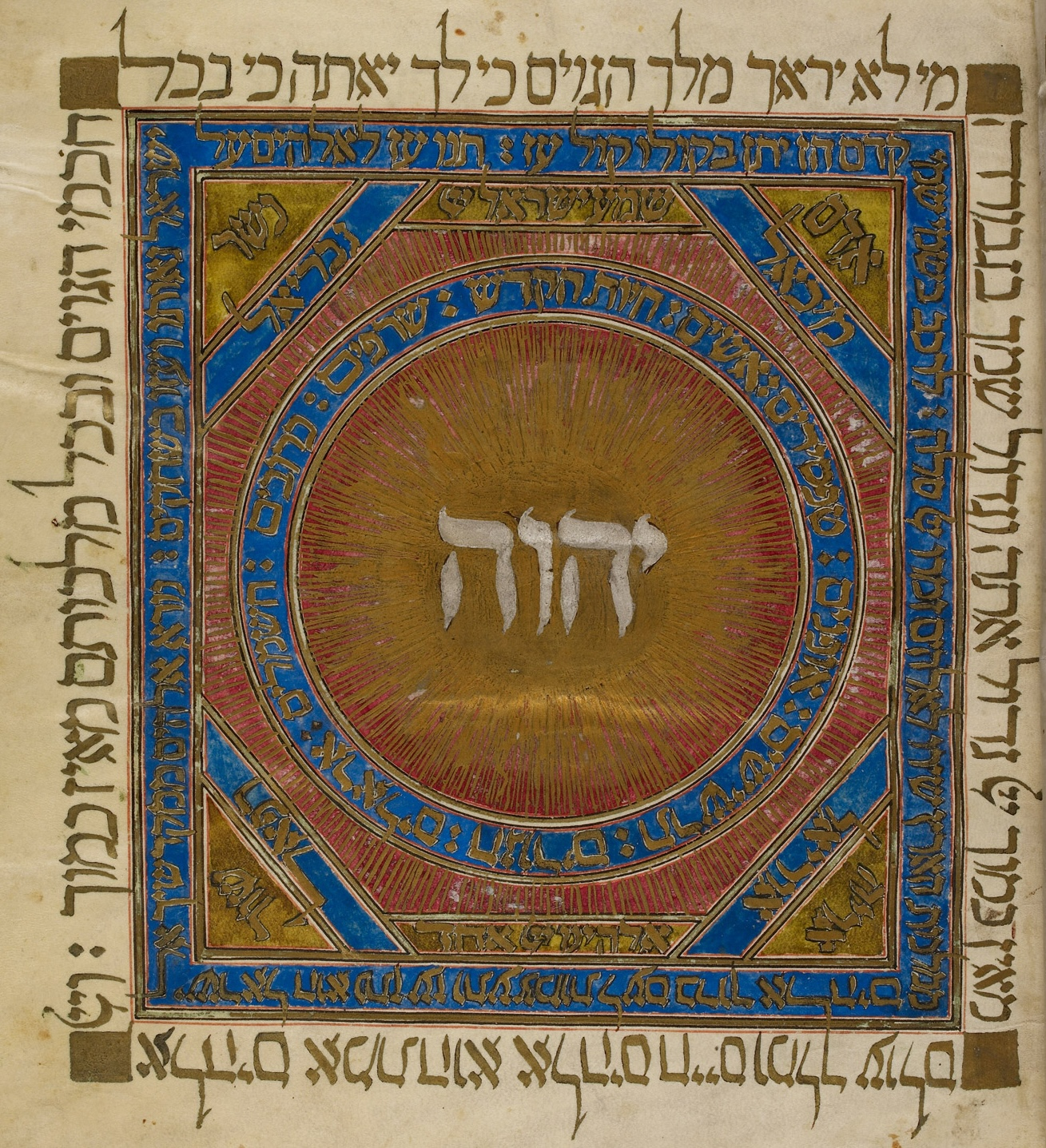
The Tetragrammaton (YHWH), the main Hebrew name of God inscribed on the page of a Sephardic manuscript of the Hebrew Bible (1385)

Judaism has different names given to God, which are considered sacred: יהוה (YHWH), אֲדֹנָי (Adonai transl. my Lord[s]), אֵל (El transl. God), אֱלֹהִים (Elohim transl. Gods/Godhead), (Note: Including variations such as אֱלוֹהַּ (Eloah, the singular), אֱלהֵי (Elohei, the construct plural), אֱלֹהֶיךָ (Elohekha), אֱלֹהֵיכֶם (eloheikhem), etc.) שַׁדַּי (Shaddai transl. Almighty), and צְבָאוֹת (Tzevaot transl. [Lord of] Hosts); some also include I Am that I Am. Early authorities considered other Hebrew names mere epithets or descriptions of God, and wrote that they and names in other languages may be written and erased freely. Some moderns advise special care even in these cases, and many Orthodox Jews have adopted the chumras of writing "G-d" instead of "God" in English or saying Ṭēt-Vav (טו, lit. '9-6') instead of Yōd-Hē (יה, '10-5', but also 'Jah') for the number fifteen or Ṭēt-Zayin (טז, '9-7') instead of Yōd-Vav (יו, '10-6') for the Hebrew number sixteen.

== Seven names of God ==
The names of God that, once written, cannot be erased because of their holiness are the Tetragrammaton (YHWH), Adonai, El, Elohim, Shaddai, Tzevaot; some also include I Am that I Am, from which "YHWH" is believed to be derived. In addition, the name Jah—because it forms part of the Tetragrammaton—is similarly protected. The tanna Jose ben Halafta considered "Tzevaot" a common name in the second century and Rabbi Ishmael considered "Elohim" to be one. All other names, such as "Merciful", "Gracious" and "Faithful", merely represent attributes that are also common to human beings.

=== Tetragrammaton ===
The Tetragrammaton in Paleo-Hebrew (fl. 1100 BCE – 500 CE) (two forms), and Aramaic (fl. 1100 BCE – 200 CE) or modern Hebrew scripts

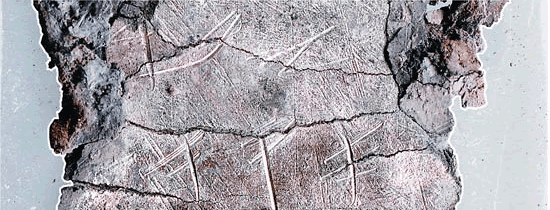
The Tetragrammaton in the Ketef Hinnom silver scrolls with the Priestly Blessing from the Book of Numbers (c. 600 BCE)

Also abbreviated Jah, the most common name of God in the Hebrew Bible is the Tetragrammaton, יהוה. The Hebrew script is an abjad, and thus vowels are often omitted in writing. The Tetragrammaton is sometimes rendered with vowels, though it is not known which vowels were used originally. Direct transliteration is avoided in Jewish custom.

Modern Rabbinical Jewish culture forbids pronunciation of this name. In prayers it is replaced by saying the word אֲדֹנָי (Adonai, Hebrew pronunciation: [adoˈnaj] 'My Lords', Pluralis majestatis taken as singular), and in discussion by HaShem 'The Name'. Nothing in the Torah explicitly prohibits speaking the name and the Book of Ruth shows that it continued to be pronounced as late as the 5th century BCE. (Note: The World English Bible translation: "Behold, Boaz came from Bethlehem, and said to the reapers, 'Yahweh be with you.' They answered him, "Yahweh bless you.'" The book is traditionally ascribed to the prophet Samuel, who lived in the 11th and 10th centuries BCE; but a date of the 6th or 5th century BCE for the passage is more common among subscribers to the Documentary Hypothesis regarding the development of the Hebrew Bible canon.) Mark Sameth argues that only a pseudo name was pronounced, the four letters יהוה (YHVH, YHWH) being a cryptogram which the priests of ancient Israel read in reverse as huhi, 'he–she', signifying a dual-gendered deity, as earlier theorized by Guillaume Postel (16th century) and Michelangelo Lanci (19th century). It had ceased to be spoken aloud by at least the 3rd century BCE, during Second Temple Judaism. The Talmud relates, perhaps anecdotally, that this began with the death of Simeon the Just. Vowel points began to be added to the Hebrew text only in the early medieval period. The Masoretic Text adds to the Tetragrammaton the vowel points of Adonai or Elohim (depending on the context), indicating that these are the words to be pronounced in place of the Tetragrammaton (see Qere and Ketiv), as shown also by the pronunciation changes when combined with a preposition or a conjunction. This is in contrast to Karaite Jews, who traditionally viewed pronouncing the Tetragrammaton as a mitzvah because the name appears some 6800 times throughout the Tanakh; however, most modern Karaites, under pressure and seeking acceptance from mainstream Rabbinical Jews, now also use the term Adonai instead. The Beta Israel pronounce the Tetragrammaton as Yahu, but also use the Geʽez term Igziabeher.

The Tetragrammaton appears in Genesis and occurs 6,828 times in total in the Biblia Hebraica Stuttgartensia edition of the Masoretic Text. It is thought to be an archaic third-person singular of the imperfective aspect (Note: Biblical Hebrew did not have strictly defined past, present, or future tenses, but merely perfective and imperfective aspects, with past, present, or future connotation depending on context: see Modern Hebrew verb conjugation#Present tense.) of the verb "to be" (i.e., "[He] is/was/will be"). This agrees with the passage in Exodus where God names himself as "I Will Be What I Will Be" using the first-person singular imperfective aspect, open to interpretation as present tense ("I am what I am"), future ("I shall be what I shall be"), or imperfect ("I used to be what I used to be").

Rabbinic Judaism teaches that the name is forbidden to all except the High Priest of Israel, who should only speak it in the Holy of Holies of the Temple in Jerusalem on Yom Kippur. He then pronounces the name "just as it is written." As each blessing was made, the people in the temple's courtyard were to prostrate themselves completely as they heard it spoken aloud. As the Temple has not been rebuilt since its destruction in 70 CE, most modern Jews never pronounce YHWH but instead read אֲדֹנָי (Adonai, Hebrew pronunciation: [adoˈnaj], 'My Lords', Pluralis majestatis taken as singular) during prayer and while reading the Torah and as HaShem 'The Name' at other times. Most English translations of the Bible write "the LORD" for YHWH, and "the LORD God" or "the Lord GOD" for Adonai YHWH instead of transcribing the name. The Septuagint may have originally used the Hebrew letters themselves amid its Greek text, but there is no scholarly consensus on this point.

=== Adonai ===
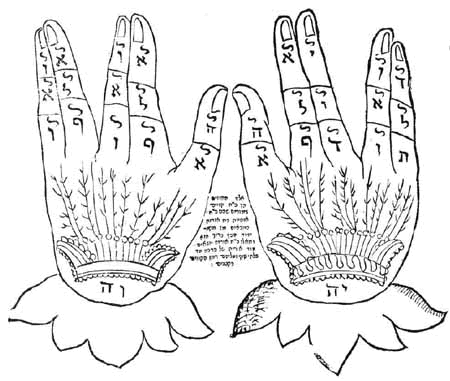
Shefa Tal – A Kabbalistic explanation of the Priestly Blessing with Adonai inscribed

Adonai

אֲדֹנָי (ăḏonāy, Biblical Hebrew pronunciation: [aðoˈnɔːj], lit. transl. My Lords, pluralis majestatis taken as singular) is the possessive form of adon ('Lord'), along with the first-person singular pronoun enclitic. (Note: Gesenius, Hebrew Grammar, §124i (on pluralis majestatis): "Further, אֲדֹנִים, as well as the singular אָדוֹן, (lordship) lord, e.g. אֲדֹנִים קָשֶׁה a cruel lord, Is 19:4; אֲדֹנֵי הָאָרֶץ the lord of the land, Gn 42:30, cf. Gn 32:19; so especially with the suffixes of the 2nd and 3rd persons אֲדֹנֶיךָ, אֲדֹנַיִךְ ψ 45:12, אֲדֹנָיו, &c., also אֲדֹנֵינוּ (except 1 S 16:16); but in 1st sing. always אֲדֹנִי. So also בְּעָלִים (with suffixes) lord, master (of slaves, cattle, or inanimate things; but in the sense of maritus, always in the singular), e.g. בְּעָלָיו Ex 21:29, Is 1:3, &c.") As with Elohim, Adonai's grammatical form is usually explained as a form akin to the "royal we". In the Hebrew Bible, the word is nearly always used to refer to God (approximately 450 occurrences). As the pronunciation of the Tetragrammaton came to be avoided in the Hellenistic period, Jews may have begun to drop the Tetragrammaton when presented alongside Adonai and subsequently to expand it to cover for the Tetragrammaton in the forms of spoken prayer and written scripture. Owing to the expansion of chumra, the idea of 'building a fence around the Torah', the word Adonai itself has come to be too holy to say for Orthodox Jews outside of prayer, leading to its replacement by HaShem ('The Name').

The singular forms adon and adoni ('my lord') are used in the Hebrew Bible as royal titles, as in the First Book of Samuel, and for distinguished persons. The Phoenicians used it as a title of Tammuz (the origin of the Greek god's name Adonis). It is also used very occasionally in Hebrew texts to refer to God (e.g. Psalm 136:3). Deuteronomy 10:17 has the Tetragrammaton alongside the superlative constructions "God of gods" (elōhê ha-elōhîm, literally, "the gods of gods") and "Lord of lords" (adōnê ha-adōnîm, "the lords of lords": כִּי יְהוָה אֱלֹהֵיכֶם הוּא אֱלֹהֵי הָאֱלֹהִים וַאֲדֹנֵי הָאֲדֹנִים; JPS 2006: "For your God יהוה is God supreme and Lord supreme").

The final syllable of Adonai uses the vowel qamatz rather than patach, which would be expected from the Hebrew for 'my lord(s)'. Professor Yoel Elitzur explains this as a normal transformation when a Hebrew word becomes a name, citing other examples such as Nathan, Yitzhak, and Yigal. As Adonai became the most common reverent substitute for the Tetragrammaton, it too became considered un-erasable due to its holiness. As such, most prayer books avoid spelling out the word Adonai, and instead write two yodhs (יְיָ) in its place.

The forms Adaunoi, Adoinoi, and Adonoi represent Ashkenazi Hebrew variant pronunciations of the word Adonai.

=== El ===
El

El appears in Ugaritic, Phoenician and other late Bronze and Iron Age Levant texts both as generic "god" and as the head of the divine pantheon. In the Hebrew Bible, El (אל, ʾel) appears very occasionally alone (for example, in Genesis 33:20, Jacob builds an altar dedicated to el elohei yisraʾel, the 'Mighty God of Israel', and Genesis 46:3 refers to haʾel elohei abika, 'El the God of thy father'), but usually with some epithet or attribute attached (e.g. El Elyon, 'Most High El', El Shaddai, El Shaddai, El ʿOlām 'Everlasting El', El Ḥayy, 'Living El', El Roʾi 'El my Shepherd', and El Gibbor 'El of Strength'). In these cases, it can be understood as the generic "god". In theophoric names such as Gabriel ("Strength of God"), Michael ("Who is like God?"), Raphael ("God healed"), Ariel ("My lion is God"), Daniel ("My judgment is God"), Ezekiel ("God shall strengthen"), Israel ("one who has struggled with God"), Immanuel ("God is with us"), and Ishmael ("God hears/ will hear / listens/ will listen") it is usually interpreted and translated as "God".

El also appears in the form אֱלוֹהַּ (Eloah).

=== Elohim ===
A common name of God in the Hebrew Bible is Elohim (אלהים, ʾĕlōhīm), the plural of אֱלוֹהַּ (Eloªh). When Elohim refers to God in the Hebrew Bible, singular verbs are used. The word is identical to elohim meaning gods and is cognate to the ʾlhm found in Ugaritic, where it is used for the pantheon of Canaanite gods, the children of El and conventionally vocalized as "Elohim" although the original Ugaritic vowels are unknown. When the Hebrew Bible uses elohim not in reference to God, it is plural (for example, Exodus 20:2). There are a few other such uses in Hebrew, for example Behemoth. In Modern Hebrew, the singular word baʿalim ('owner') looks plural, but likewise takes a singular verb.

A number of scholars have traced the etymology to the Semitic root *yl, 'to be first, powerful', despite some difficulties with this view. Elohim is thus the plural construct 'powers'. Hebrew grammar allows for this form to mean "He is the Power (singular) over powers (plural)", just as the word Baʿalim means 'owner' (see above). "He is lord (singular) even over any of those things that he owns that are lordly (plural)".

Theologians who dispute this claim cite the hypothesis that plurals of majesty came about in more modern times. Richard Toporoski, a classics scholar, asserts that plurals of majesty first appeared in the reign of Diocletian (CE 284–305). Indeed, Gesenius states in his book Hebrew Grammar the following:

The Jewish grammarians call such plurals ... plur. virium or virtutum; later grammarians call them plur. excellentiae, magnitudinis, or plur. maiestaticus. This last name may have been suggested by the we used by kings when speaking of themselves (compare 1 Maccabees 10:19 and 11:31); and the plural used by God in Genesis 1:26 and 11:7; Isaiah 6:8 has been incorrectly explained in this way. It is, however, either communicative (including the attendant angels: so at all events in Isaiah 6:8 and Genesis 3:22), or according to others, an indication of the fullness of power and might implied. It is best explained as a plural of self-deliberation. The use of the plural as a form of respectful address is quite foreign to Hebrew.

Mark S. Smith has cited the use of plural as possible evidence to suggest an evolution in the formation of early Jewish conceptions of monotheism, wherein references to "the gods" (plural) in earlier accounts of verbal tradition became either interpreted as multiple aspects of a single monotheistic God at the time of writing, or subsumed under a form of monolatry, wherein the god(s) of a certain city would be accepted after the fact as a reference to the God of Israel and the plural deliberately dropped.

The plural form ending in -im can also be understood as denoting abstraction, as in the Hebrew words chayyim (חיים, ḥayyīm 'life') or betulim (בתולים, 'virginity'). If understood this way, Elohim means 'divinity' or 'deity'. The word chayyim is similarly syntactically singular when used as a name but syntactically plural otherwise. In many of the passages in which elohim occurs in the Bible, it refers to non-Israelite deities, or in some instances to powerful men or judges, and even angels (Exodus 21:6, Psalms 8:5) as a simple plural in those instances.

=== Shaddai ===
El Shaddai (אל שדי, ʾel šadday, pronounced [ʃaˈdaj]) is one of the names of God in Judaism, with its etymology coming from the influence of the Ugaritic religion on modern Judaism. El Shaddai is conventionally translated as "God Almighty". While the translation of El as 'god' in Ugaritic/Canaanite languages is straightforward, the literal meaning of Shaddai is the subject of debate.

=== Tzevaot ===
Tzevaot, Tzevaoth, Tsebaʾot or Saba’oth (צבאות, ṣəḇāʾōṯ, pronounced [tsɘβaʕot], lit. "Armies"), usually translated "Hosts", appears in reference to armies or armed hosts of men but is not used as a divine epithet in the Torah, Joshua, or Judges. Starting in the Books of Samuel, the term "Lord of Hosts" appears hundreds of times throughout the Prophetic books, in Psalms, and in Chronicles.

The Hebrew word Tzevaoth was also absorbed in Ancient Greek (σαβαωθ, sabaōth) and Latin (Sabaoth, with no declension). Tertullian and other Fathers of the Church used it with the meaning of "Army of angels of God".

=== Ehyeh ===
Ehyeh asher ehyeh (אֶהְיֶה אֲשֶׁר אֶהְיֶה) is the first of three responses given to Moses when he asks for God's name in the Book of Exodus. The King James Version of the Bible translates the Hebrew as "I Am that I Am" and uses it as a way to describe God.

Ehyeh-Asher-Ehyeh

The word ehyeh is the first-person singular imperfect form of hayah, 'to be'. Biblical Hebrew does not distinguish between grammatical tenses. It has instead an aspectual system in which the imperfect denotes any actions that are not yet completed, Accordingly, Ehyeh asher ehyeh can be rendered in English not only as "I am that I am" but also as "I will be what I will be" or "I will be who I will be", or "I shall prove to be whatsoever I shall prove to be" or even "I will be because I will be". Other renderings include: Leeser, "I Will Be that I Will Be"; Rotherham, "I Will Become whatsoever I please", Greek, Ego eimi ho on (ἐγώ εἰμι ὁ ὤν), "I am Being/the Existing One" in the Septuagint, and Philo, and Revelation; Latin, ego sum qui sum, "I am Who I am."

The word asher is a relative pronoun whose meaning depends on the immediate context, so that "that", "who", "which", or "where" are all possible translations of that word.

== Other names and titles ==
=== Baal ===
Baal (בעל baʿal) meant 'owner' and, by extension, 'lord', 'master', and 'husband' in Hebrew and the other Northwest Semitic languages. In some early contexts and theophoric names, it and Baali (/ˈbeɪəlaɪ/; "My Lord") were treated as synonyms of Adon and Adonai. After the time of Solomon and particularly after Jezebel's attempt to promote the worship of the Lord of Tyre Melqart, however, the name became particularly associated with the Canaanite storm god Baʿal Haddu and was gradually avoided as a title for Yahweh. Several names that included it were rewritten as bosheth ("shame"). The prophet Hosea in particular reproached the Israelites for continuing to use the term:

"It will come about in that day," declares the Lord, "That you will call Me Ishi (Note: Literally, "my husband".) And will no longer call Me Baali."

=== Elah ===
Elah (Hebrew: אֱלָה, romanized: ʾelāh, pl. Elim or Elohim; Imperial Aramaic: אלהא) is the Aramaic word for God and the absolute singular form of אלהא, ʾilāhā. The origin of the word is from Proto-Semitic *ʔil and is thus cognate to the Hebrew, Arabic, Akkadian, and other Semitic languages' words for god. Elah is found in the Tanakh in the books of Ezra, Jeremiah (Jeremiah 10:11, the only verse in the entire book written in Aramaic), and Daniel. Elah is used to describe both pagan gods and the Abrahamic God.

- Elah Yisraʾel, God of Israel (Ezra 5:1)
- Elah Yerushelem, God of Jerusalem (Ezra 7:19)
- Elah Shemaya, God of Heaven (Ezra 7:23)
- Elah-aḇahati, God of my fathers, (Daniel 2:23)
- Elah Elahin, God of gods (Daniel 2:47)

=== El Roi ===
אל ראי (el roʾī) In the Book of Genesis, Hagar uses this name for the God who spoke to her through his angel. In Hebrew, her phrase El Roi, literally, 'God of Seeing Me', is translated in the King James Version as "Thou God seest me."

=== Elyon ===
`Elyon

The name Elyon (עליון ʿelyōn) occurs in combination with El, YHWH, Elohim and alone. It appears chiefly in poetic and later Biblical passages. The modern Hebrew adjective ‘Elyon means 'supreme' (as in "Supreme Court": Hebrew: בית המשפט העליון) or 'Most High'. El Elyon has been traditionally translated into English as 'God Most High'. The Phoenicians used what appears to be a similar name for God, one that the Greeks wrote as Έλιονα.

=== Eternal One ===
The Eternal One or The Eternal is increasingly used, particularly in Reform and Reconstructionist communities seeking to use gender-neutral language. In the Torah, YHWH El ʿOlam ("the Everlasting God") is used at Genesis 21:33, where Abraham plants a tamarisk tree in Beersheba and dedicates it to God.

=== HaShem ===
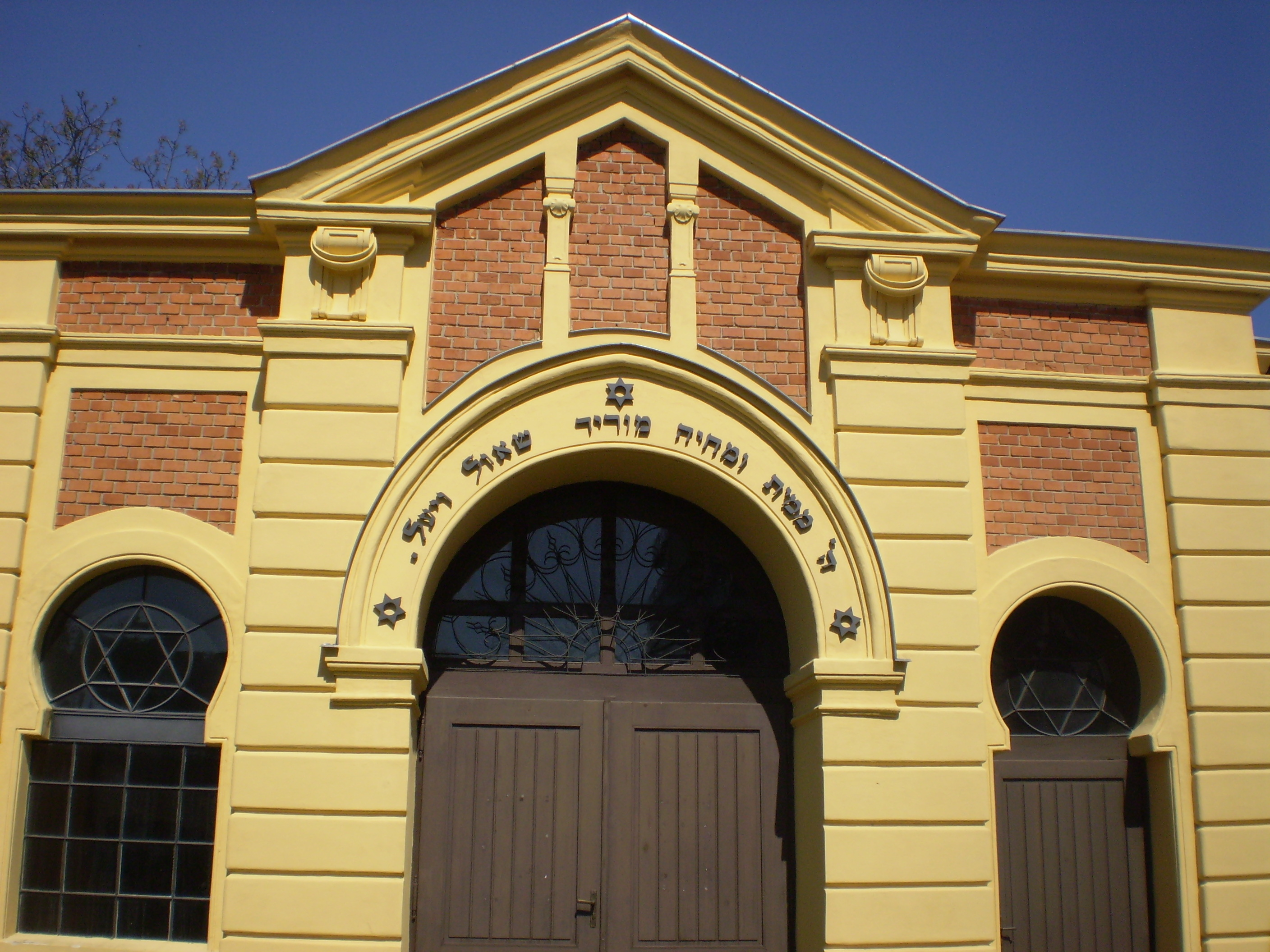
Biblical text on a synagogue in Holešov, Czech Republic: "HaShem (ה׳) kills and makes alive; He brings down to Sheol and raises up." (1 Samuel 2:6)

It is common Jewish practice to restrict the use of the names of God to a liturgical context. In casual conversation some Jews, even when not speaking Hebrew, will call God HaShem (השם ha-šem), which is Hebrew for 'the Name' (compare Leviticus 24:11 and Deuteronomy 28:58). When written, it is often abbreviated to ה׳. Likewise, when quoting from the Tanakh or prayers, some pious Jews will replace Adonai with HaShem. For example, when making audio recordings of prayer services, HaShem will generally be substituted for Adonai.

In modern Israeli society, the use of 'HaShem' has expanded beyond religious circles, often serving as a cultural idiom for secular and traditional Jews to express gratitude or hope through phrases such as 'Barukh HaShem' or 'BeʿEzrat HaShem'.

A popular expression containing this phrase is Barukh HaShem, meaning "Thank God" (literally, 'Blessed be the Name').

Samaritans use the Aramaic equivalent Shema (ࠔࠌࠀ, 'the name') in much the same situations as Jews use HaShem.

=== Shalom ===
Talmudic authors, ruling on the basis of Gideon's name for an altar (YHVH-Shalom, according to Judges 6:24), write that "the name of God is 'Peace'" (Pereq ha-Shalom, Shabbat 10b); consequently, a Talmudic opinion (Shabbat, 10b) asserts that one would greet another with the word shalom in order for the word not to be forgotten in the exile. But one is not permitted to greet another with the word Shalom in unholy places such as a bathroom, because of the holiness of the name.

=== Shekhinah ===
Shekhinah (שכינה šeḵīnā) is the presence or manifestation of God which has descended to "dwell" among humanity. The term never appears in the Hebrew Bible; later rabbis used the word when speaking of God dwelling either in the Tabernacle or amongst the people of Israel. The root of the word means "dwelling". Of the principal names of God, it is the only one that is of the feminine gender in Hebrew grammar. Some believe that this was the name of a female counterpart of God, but this is unlikely as the name is always mentioned in conjunction with an article (e.g.: "the Shekhina descended and dwelt among them" or "He removed Himself and His Shekhina from their midst"). This kind of usage does not occur in Semitic languages in conjunction with proper names. The term, however, may not be a name, as it may merely describe the presence of God, and not God Himself.

== Uncommon or esoteric names ==
- Abir – 'Strong One'
- Adir – 'Great One'
- Adon ʿOlam – 'Master of the World'
- Aleim – sometimes seen as an alternative transliteration of Elohim
- Ani sheʾAni – 'I am that I am': another modern Hebrew form of "Ehyeh asher Ehyeh"
- Araḇat (or Avarat) – 'Father of Creation'; mentioned once in 2 Enoch, "On the tenth heaven is God, in the Hebrew tongue he is called Aravat".
- Aḇ ha-Raḥamim – 'Father of Mercy'
- Aḇinu Malkeinu – 'Our Father, Our King'
- Boreʾ – 'The Creator'
- Boreʾ ʿOlam – 'Creator of the World'
- Dibbura or Dibbera – 'The Word (The Law)' – used primarily in the Palestinian Targums of the Pentateuch (Aramaic); e.g. Num 7:89, The Word spoke to Moses from between the cherubim in the holy of holies.
- Ehiyeh sheʾEhiyeh – 'I Am That I Am': a modern Hebrew version of "Ehyeh asher Ehyeh"
- Eybirshter/Aibishter – 'The One Above' (Yiddish: אײבערשטער)
- Ein Sof – 'Endless, Infinite', Kabbalistic name of God
- El ha-Gibbor – 'God the Hero', 'God the Strong' and 'God the Warrior'
- Emet – 'Truth' (the "Seal of God". [Cf.] The word is composed of the first, middle, and last letters of the Hebrew alphabet. See also Alpha and Omega#Judaism)
- Ha-Qadosh, Barukh Huʾ (Hebrew); Qudsha, B'rikh Hu (Aramaic) – 'The Holy One, Blessed Be He'
- Hayah, Howeh, we-Yihyeh – 'Was, Is, and Will be'
- Qadosh Yisraʾel – 'Holy One of Israel'
- Magen Aḇraham – 'Shield of Abraham'
- Maqom or Ha-Maqom – literally 'The Place', perhaps meaning 'The Omnipresent' (see Tzimtzum)
- Malbish Arumim – 'Clother of the Naked'
- Matir Asurim – 'Freer of the Captives'
- Meḥayeh ha-Kol – 'Life giver to All' (Reform version of Mechayeh Metim)
- Meḥayeh Metim – 'Life giver to the Dead'
- Melekh ha-Melakhim – 'The King of Kings' or Melech Malchei HaMelachim 'The King, King of Kings', to express superiority to the earthly ruler's title
- Melekh ha-ʿOlam – 'The King of the World'
- Memra d'Adonai – 'The Word of the LORD' (plus variations such as 'My Word') – restricted to the Aramaic Targums (the written Tetragrammaton is represented in various ways such as YYY, YWY, YY, but pronounced as the Hebrew Adonai)
- Mi sheʾamar we-hayah ha-ʿOlam – 'He who spoke, and the world came into being'.
- Netsaḥ Yisraʾel – 'The Glory of Israel' (1 Samuel 15:29)
- ʿOse Shalom – 'Maker of Peace'
- Poqeaḥ ʿIḇrim – 'Opener of Blind Eyes'
- Ha-Raḥaman – 'The Merciful One'
- Raḥmana – 'The Merciful One' (Aramaic)
- Ribon Kol ha-ʿOlamim – 'Master of all Worlds'
- Ribono shelʿOlam – 'Master of the World'
- Roʾe Yisraʾel – 'Shepherd of Israel'
- Ropheʾ Ḥolim – 'Healer of the Sick'
- Shomer Yisraʾel – 'Guardian of Israel'
- Somekh Nophlim – 'Supporter of the Fallen'
- Tsur Yisraʾel – 'Rock of Israel'
- YHWH-Yirʾe (Adonai-yirʕe) – 'The LORD Will Provide'
- YHWH-Raphaʾ – 'The LORD that Healeth'
- YHWH-Nissi (Adonai-Nissi) – 'The LORD Our Banner'
- YHWH-Shalom – 'The LORD Our Peace'
- YHWH-Tseḇaʾot – 'The LORD of Hosts'
- YHWH-Roʾi – 'The LORD My Shepherd'
- YHWH-Tsidqenu – 'The LORD Our Righteousness'
- YHWH-Shamma (Adonai-shammah) – 'The LORD Is Present'
- Yotser Or – 'Fashioner of Light'
- Zoqeph kephuphim – 'Straightener of the Bent'

The Psalms in Hebrew and Latin. Manuscript on parchment, 12th century.

== Writing divine names ==
In Jewish tradition the sacredness of the divine name or titles must be recognized by the professional sofer (scribe) who writes Torah scrolls, or tefillin and mezuza. Before transcribing any of the divine titles or name, they prepare mentally to sanctify them. Once they begin a name, they do not stop until it is finished, and they must not be interrupted while writing it, even to greet a king. If an error is made in writing, it may not be erased, but a line must be drawn round it to show that it is canceled, and the whole page must be put in a geniza (burial place for scripture) and a new page begun.

== Kabbalistic use ==
One of the most important names is that of the Ein Sof (אין סוף 'Endless'), which first came into use after 1300 CE. Another name is derived from the names אהיה יהוה אדוני הויה. By spelling these four names out with the names of the Hebrew letters (אלף, הא, וו, יוד, דלת and נון) this new forty-five letter long name is produced. Spelling the letters in יהוה (YHWH) by itself gives יוד הא ואו הא. Each letter in Hebrew is given a value, according to gematria, and the value of יוד הא ואו הא is also 45.

The 72-fold name is derived from three verses in Exodus 14:19–21. Each of the verses contains 72 letters. When the verses are read boustrophedonically 72 names, three letters each, are produced (the niqqud of the source verses is disregarded in respect to pronunciation). Some regard this name as the Shem HaMephorash.

== Erasing the name of God ==
3 And ye shall break down their altars, and dash in pieces their pillars, and burn their Asherim with fire; and ye shall hew down the graven images of their gods; and ye shall destroy their name out of that place. 4 Ye shall not do so unto the LORD your God.

— Deuteronomy 12:3–4

From this it is understood by the rabbis that one should not erase or blot out the name of God. The general halakhic opinion is that this only applies to the sacred Hebrew names of God, not to other euphemistic references; there is a dispute as to whether the word "God" in English or other languages may be erased or whether Jewish law and/or Jewish custom forbids doing so, directly or as a precautionary "fence" about the law.

The words God and Lord are written by some Jews as G-d and L-rd as a way of avoiding writing any name of God in full. Alternatively, a euphemistic reference such as Ha-Shem (literally, 'the Name') may be substituted, or an abbreviation thereof, such as in B''H (בְּעֶזרַת הַשֵׁם Beʿezrat Ha-Shem 'with the help of the Name').

== See also ==
- Ancient of Days
- Baal Shem
- Besiyata Dishmaya
- Names of God
- Names of God in Zoroastrianism
- Names of God in Christianity
- Names of God in Islam
- Names of God in Sikhism
- Naming taboo (a similar prohibition in China)
- Sacred Name Bibles
- Ten Commandments
- Vishnu Sahasranama
