= Nissi =

Nissi may refer to:

- Nishi language, a language spoken in Arunachal Pradesh, India.
- Nissi Parish, Estonia.
- Nissi, part of Riisipere small borough, Estonia.
- Jehovah-Nissi.
