= Adonaist =

An Adonaist is a sect or party who maintain that the Hebrew language vowel points ordinarily annexed to the consonants of the word "Jehovah", are not the natural points belonging to that word, and that they do not express the true pronunciation of it; but that they are vowel points belonging to the words, Adonai and Elohim, applied to the ineffable name Jehovah, which the Jews were forbidden to utter, and the true pronunciation of which was lost; they were therefore always to pronounce the word Adonai, instead of Jehovah.

== Adonai ==
Adonai

Jews also call God Adonai, Hebrew for "Lord" (Hebrew: אֲדֹנָי). Formally, this is plural ("my Lords"), but the plural is usually construed as a respectful, and not a syntactic plural. (The singular form is Adoni, "my lord". This was used by the Phoenicians for the god Tammuz and is the origin of the Greek name Adonis. Jews only use the singular to refer to a distinguished person: in the plural, "rabotai", literally, "my masters", is used in both Mishnaic and modern Hebrew.)

Since pronouncing YHWH is avoided out of reverence for the holiness of the name, Jews use Adonai instead in prayers, and colloquially would use Hashem ("the Name"). When the Masoretes added vowel pointings to the text of the Hebrew Bible around the eighth century CE, they gave the word YHWH the vowels of Adonai, to remind the reader to say Adonai instead. It is thought by some that later Biblical scholars mistook this vowel substitution for the actual spelling of YHWH and interpreted the name of God as "Jehovah".

The Sephardi translators of the Ferrara Bible go further and substitute Adonai with A.
