= Names of God in Zoroastrianism =

In Zoroastrianism, there are 101 names and titles used to refer to Ahura Mazda. The list is preserved in Persian, Pazend, and Gujarati.

The names are often taken during Baj (ceremonial prayer) as part of Yasna while continuously sprinkling with the ring made of eight metals with the hair of the pure Varasya named "Vars" into the water vessel.

== List of names ==
Two translations for each name are provided below, one by Meher Baba and the other from an online source (persiandna.com).

Number	Name (Romanized)	Name (Modern Persian)	Translations
1	Yazad; Yazad	ايزد	Worthy of Worship; Praiseworthy
2	Harvesp-tawan; Harvesp-Tavaan	هروسپ توان	All-Powerful; Almighty
3	Harvesp-agah; Harvesp-Aagaah	هروسپ آگاه	All-Knowing; All-Knowing
4	Harvesp-khoda; Harvesp-Khudaa	هروسپ خدا	Lord of all Lord of All
5	Abadeh; Abadah	ابده	Without Beginning; Without Beginning
6	Abi-anjam; Abee-Anjaam	ابی انجام	Without End; Without End
7	Bun-e-stiha; Bune-Steeh	بنستيه	Root of Creation; Root of Creation
8	Frakhtan-taih; Fraakhtan-Teh	فراختن ته	Vast end of all things The End of All
9	Jamaga; Jamaga	جمغ	Primal Cause; Ancient Cause
10	Prajatarah; Parajtarah	پراژتره	Exalted One; More Noble
11	Tum-afik; Tum-Afeek	توم اویک	Purest of the Pure; Most Open (Innocent)
12	Abaravand; Abarvand	ابروند	Detached from All; Separate from All
13	Paravandeh; Parvandaah	پروندا	In touch with all Connected with All
14	An-ayafeh; An-Aiyaafah	ان اياف	Unattainable; Unreachable by anyone
15	Hama-Ayafeh; Ham-Aiyaafah	هم اياف	Attainer of All; Who Can Reach All
16	Adro; Aadaro	آدرو	Most Righteous; Most straightforward; Truest of All
17	Gira; Geeraa	گيرا	Upholder of all Who Holds Everyone
18	A-ehem; A-Chem	اچم	Beyond reason Without Cause (Does not need a reason for existence)
19	Chamana; Chamanaa	چمنا	Sovereign Reason; Reason for Being
20	Safana; Safanaa	سفنا	Bountiful One; Creator of Progress
21	Afza; Afjaa	افجا	Ever Prolific; Creator of Growth
22	Nasha; Naashaa	ناشا	Reaching equally to all Who Reaches Everyone Equally
23	Parwara; Parvaraa	پرورا	Nourisher; Provider
24	Ianaha; Eeyaanah	ايانا	Protector of the world Protector of Creation
25	Ain-aenah; Aaeen-Aaenah	آيين آيينه	Never Changing; Not Different
26	An-aenah; An-Aaeenah	ان آيينه	Formless; Without Shape
27	Kharoshid-tum; Khrosheed-Tum	خراشيدتوم	Most Steadfast among the Steadfast; Most Determined
28	Mino-tum; Meeno-Tum	مينوتوم	Lord Invisible; Most Invisible
29	Vasna; Vaasnaa	واسنا	All-Pervading; Omnipresent
30	Harvastum; Harvastum	هروس توم	All in all Most Complete
31	Hu-sepas; Hu-Sepaas	هوسپاس	Worthy of our profound thanks Worthy of Thanksgiving
32	Har-Hamid; Har-Hameed	هرهميد	All embracing Goodness; Completely Good Natured
33	Har-naik faraih Har-Nek-Fareh	هرنيک فره	All embracing Holy light Completely Good Noble Aura
34	Baish-tarana; Besh-Tarnaa	بيش ترنا	Remover of affliction Remover of Suffering
35	Taronish; Taroneesh	تروبيش	Beyond Affliction; Mysterious
36	Anah-aoshaka; An-Aoshak	انوشک	Immortal; Immortal
37	Farasaka; Farsak	فرسک	Fulfiller of Holy Desires; Grantor of Wishes
38	Pajohdehad; Pajoh-Dahad	پژودهد	Creator of Holy attributes Creator of Noble Nature
39	Khwafar; Khvaafar	خوافر	Compassionate Judge; Generous with Justice
40	Avakhshiaea; Afakhsheeaaeaa	اوه خشيا	Merciful Giver; Grantor of Generosity
41	Abaraja; Abarjaa	ابرجا	Bountiful Giver; Most Abundant Provider
42	A-satoha; A-Satoh	استوه	Unconquerable; Who Does Not Get Angry
43	Rakhoha; Rakhoh	رخوا	Freest of the free Independent; Without Worry
44	Varun; Varoon	ورون	Deliverer from evil Protector from Evil
45	A-farefah; A-Farefah	افريفه	Never Deceiving; Who Does Not Deceive
46	Be-fareftah; Be-Farefah	بی فريفه	Never Deceived; Who Cannot Be Deceived
47	A-dui; A-Duee	ادويی	One without a second Without Duality
48	Kam-rad; Kaame-Rad	کامرد	Lord of desire Lord of Wishes
49	Farman-kam; Farmaan-Kaam	فرمان کام	Decreer of Sovereign Desire; Wish Is His Command
50	Aekh Tan; Aokh-Tan	ائيک تن	Soul Supreme; Without Body
51	A-faremosh; A-Faremosh	افراموش	Never-forgetting; Who Does Not Forget
52	Hamarna; Hamaarnaa	همارنا	Just Accountant; Keeper of Accounts
53	Sanaea; Sanaaeaa	سنايا	Knowing all things Worthy of Knowing; All Knowing
54	A-tars; A-Tars	اترس	Fearless; Fearless
55	A-bish; A-Beesh	ابيش	Devoid of pain Without Suffering
56	A-frajdum; Afraajdum	افراجدم	Most exalted one Most High
57	Ham-chun; Ham-Chun	هم چون	Ever the same Always the Same
58	Mino-satihgar; Meeno-Steeh-Gar	مينو ستی گر	Invisible Creator of the Universe; Creator of the Universe Invisibly
59	A-minogar; A-Meenogar	امينوگر	Creator of the Profoundly Spiritual; Creator of Much Invisible Creations
60	Mino-nahab; Meeno-Nahab	مينو نهب	Hidden within the spirit Hidden in Invisible Creation
61	Adar-bad-gar; Aadar-Baad-Gar	آذربادگر	Transmuter of Fire into Air; Who Changes Fire Into Air
62	Adar-nam-gar; Aadar-Nam-Gar	آذرنم گر	Transmuter of Fire into dew Who Changes Fire Into Water
63	Bad-adar-gar; Baad-Aadar-Gar	بادآذرگر	Transmuter of Air into Fire; Who Changes Air Into Fire
64	Bad-nam-gar; Baad-Nam-Gar	بادنم گر	Transmuter of Air into dew Who Changes Air Into Water
65	Bad-gail-gar; Baad-Gel-Gar	بادگل گر	Transmuter of Air into Earth; Who Changes Air Into Dust
66	Bad-gred-tum; Baad-Gerd-Tum	بادگردتوم	Supreme Transmuter of Air into dust Who Changes Air Into Wind
67	Adar-kibritatum; Aadar-Keebreet-Tum	آذرکبريت توم	Supreme Transmuter of Fire into divine sparks Who Changes Fire Into Jewels
68	Bad-gar-jae; Baad-Garjaae	بادگرجای	Spreading Air everywhere Who Creates Air In All Places
69	Ab-tum; Aab-Tum	آب توم	Creator of Lifegiving water Creator of Much Water
70	Gail-adar-gar; Gel-Aadar-Gar	گل آذرگر	Transmuter of Dust into Fire; Who Changes Dust Into Fire
71	Gail-vad-gar; Gel-Vaad-Gar	گل وادگر	Transmuter of Dust into Air; Who Changes Dust Into Air
72	Gail-nam-gar; Gel-Nam-Gar	گل نم گر	Transmuter of Dust into water Who Changes Dust Into Water
73	Gar-gar; Gar-Gar	گرگر	Master Craftsman; Creator of Creators
74	Garo-gar; Gar-O-Gar	گروگر	Rewarder of sincere desires (Fulfiller of Wishes) *
75	Gar-a-gar; Gar-Aa-Gar	گرآگر	Creator of all Humanity and its actions (Creator of Mankind) *
76	Gar-a-gar-gar; Gar-Aa-Gar-Gar	گرآگرگر	Creator of all Human and Animal Life (Creator of All Things) *
77	A-gar-agar; A-Gar-Aa-Gar	آگرآگر	Creator of all the four elements (Creator of 4 Elements) *
78	A-gar-a-gar-gar; A-Gar-Aa-Gar-Gar	آگرآگرگر	Creator of all the planets and all other worlds (Creator of Stars) *
79	A-guman; A-Gumaan	اگمان	Never in doubt Without Doubt
80	A-jaman; A-Jamaan	اجمان	Ageless; Timeless
81	A-Khuan; A-Khuaan	اخوان	Eternally awake Sleepless
82	Amast; Aamasht	اميشت	Ever-alert; Alert
83	Fashutana; Fashutanaa	فشتوتنا	Ever-Protecting; Always Guarding & Progress Creator
84	Padmani; Padmaanee	پدمانی	Recorder of Man's actions Keeper of Limits
85	Firozgar; Feerozgar	فيروزگر	Victorious; Victorious
86	Khudawand; Khudaavand	خداوند	Lord of the Universe; Lord of Creation
87	Ahuramazd; Ahur-Mazd	اهورا مزدا	Lord of Life and Wisdom; Wise Lord
88	Abarin-kuhan-tawan; Abreen-Kohun-Tavaan	ابرين كهان توان	Preserver of Creation; Most Capable of Preserving Originality of Creations
89	Abarin-nao-tawan; Abreen-No-Tavaan	ابرين نوتوان	Renewer of Creation; Most Capable of Creating New Creations
90	Vaspan; Vaspaan	وسپان	Embracing All Creation; Who Can Reach All Creations
91	Vaaspar; Vaspaar	وسپار	Giver of All Things; Who Can Provide Everything
92	Khawar; Khaavar	خاور	Infinitely Patient; Generous
93	Ahu; Ahu	اهو	Lord of exisience Lord of Existence
94	Avakshidar; Avakhseedaar	اوخسيدار	Forgiver of sins Forgiver
95	Dadar; Daadaar	دادار	Divine Creator; Creator of Justice
96	Raiyomand; Rayomand	رايومند	Rayed in glory Full of Brightness
97	Khorehmand; Khorehomand	خرهمند	Haloed in Light; Full of Aura, Light
98	Davar; Daavar	داور	Lord of Justice; Giver of True Justice
99	Kerfaigar; Kerfegar	کرفگر	Lord of Just Rewards; Lord of Good Works
100	Bokhtar; Bokhtaar	بوختار	Liberator; Giver of Freedom for Progress
101	Farsho-gar; Frash-Gar	فرشوگر	Awakener of Eternal Spring; Refresher of the Soul with Progress

== See also ==
- Names of God
- Names of God in Christianity
- Names of God in Judaism
- Names of God in Islam
- Names of God in Sikhism
- Sahasranama
