= Adon =

Lord

Adon (Phoenician: 𐤀𐤃𐤍) literally means "lord." Adon has an uncertain etymology, although it is generally believed to be derived from the Ugaritic ad, “father.”

== Ugaritic tradition ==
The pluralization of adon "my lord" is adonai "my lords." Otto Eissfeldt theorizes that adonai is a post positive element attested to in Ugaritic writing. He points to the myth of the struggle between Baal and Yam as evidence. Some theorize that adonai was originally an epithet of the god Yahweh depicted as the chief antagonist of "the Baʿals" in the Tanakh. Only later did the epithet come to be used as a euphemism to avoid invoking the deity's proper name, Yahweh.

In Canaanite/Ugaritic tradition, ʾadn ilm, literally "lord of gods" is an epithet of El. However, ʾadn "lord" could also be an epithet of other gods. When Yam is described as being at the zenith of his might, he is proclaimed ʾadn or "lord" of the gods. In some Ugaritic texts the term ʾadn ʾilm rbm meaning "the Lord of the Great Gods" is used to refer to the lord and father over deceased kings. Some think that this is a reference to Baal. Other suggest this is a reference to a human necromancer, who was traveling to the land of the dead. Karel van der Toorn disagrees; he believes that it is a reference to Milku, Yaqar or Yarikh, or possibly El. Ugarit family households were modeled after the structure of the divine world, each headed by an ʾadn meaning in this context "master" or "patron". Generally, this was the patriarch of the family and there may be some relation between ʾadn and the Ugarit word for "father", ʾad.

== Etymology ==
The name of the Greek god Adonis is similar to a Semitic word—adon (which means "lord"). Scholar Walter Burkert stated about the hypothetical deity "Adon" : "there is in Semitic tradition no known cult connected with this title which corresponds exactly to the Greek cult, to say the nothing of a counterpart to the Greek Adonis myth" but for the cult of Adonis points to an inherited tradition stemming directly from the Mesopotamian cult of Tammuz-Dumuzid

== Hebrew Bible ==
In the Hebrew Bible, adoni, with the suffix for the first person possessive, means "my lord", and is a term of respect that may refer to God or to a human superior, or occasionally an angel, whereas adonai (literally "my lords") is reserved for God alone. In Jewish tradition, the pluralization can be used to distinguish God from earthly lords and to increase his majesty. However, many modern critical scholars see the use of a plural as a remnant of a polytheistic past, with the word only later coming to refer to Yahweh, the single god of Judaism. It is thought that at least some biblical authors used the word originally in a polytheist sense.

== See also ==
- Adonaist
