= Jehovah-jireh =

Location of the binding of Isaac in Genesis

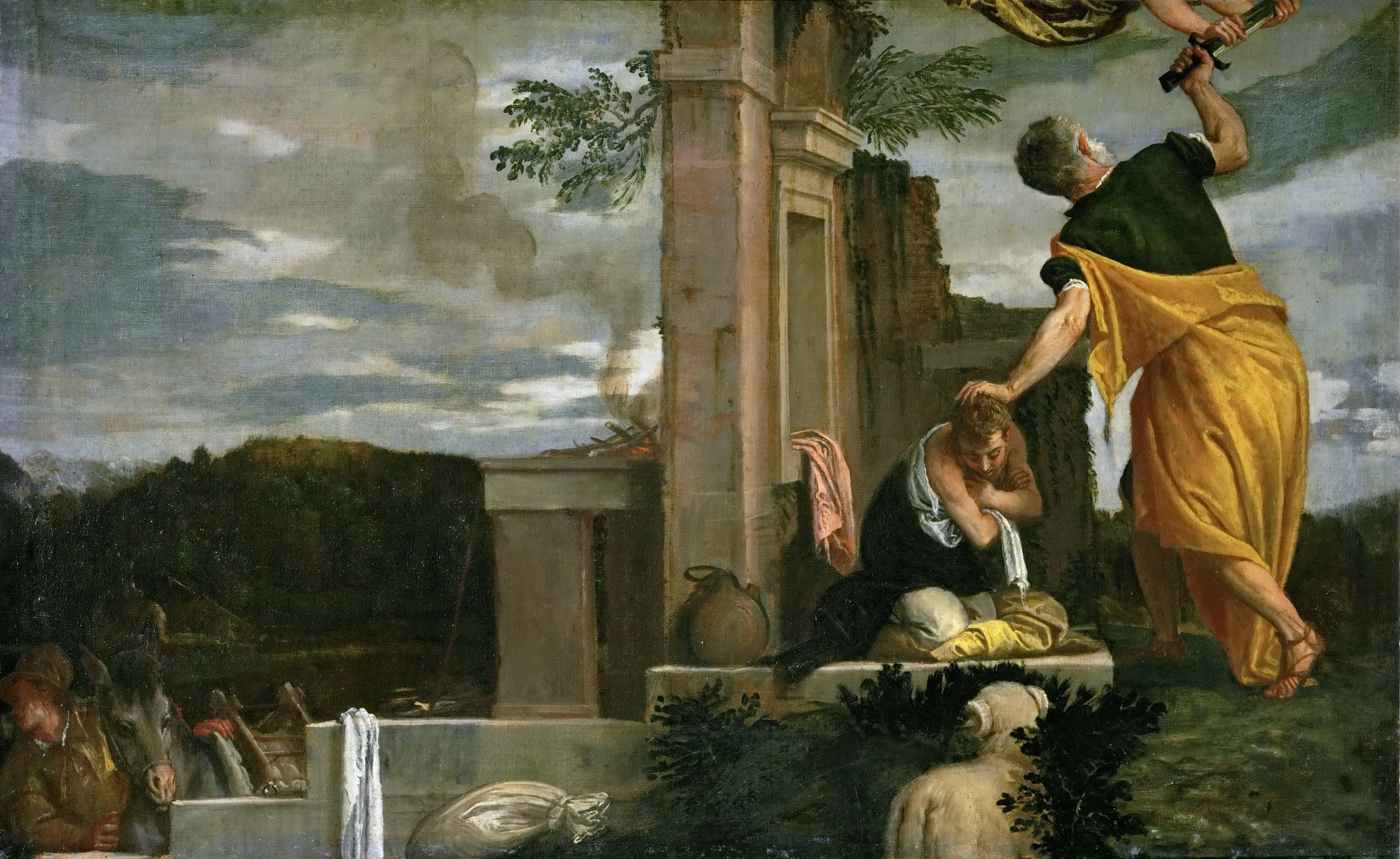
The Sacrifice of Isaac by Paolo Veronese, which simultaneously depicts the angel and the ram at Jehovah-jireh.

In the Book of Genesis, Yahweh-jireh or Adonai-jireh was the location in the land of Moriah where God (sometimes vocalized as Jehovah) told Abraham to offer his son Isaac as a burnt offering. Abraham gave the place this name after God had provided a ram to sacrifice in place of Isaac. This name, hence, carries the meaning, "The Lord will provide".

== Translations ==
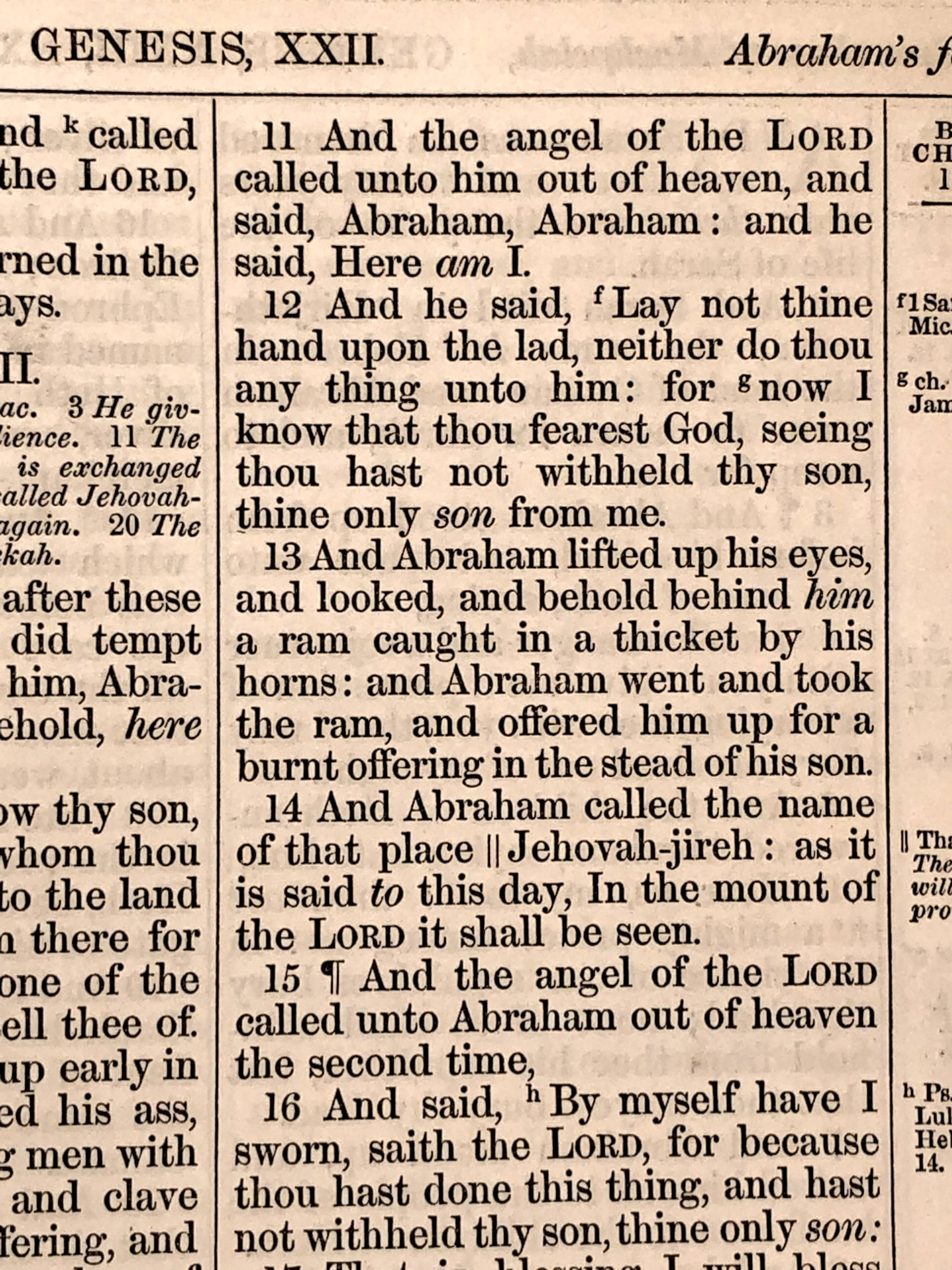
Jehovah-jireh in King James Bible 1853 Genesis 22:14

In the Masoretic Text, the name is יְהוָה יִרְאֶה (yhwh yirʾeh). The first word of the phrase is the Tetragrammaton (יהוה), YHWH, the most common name of God in the Hebrew Bible, which is usually given the pronunciation Yahweh in scholarly works. Jehovah is a Christian anglicized vocalization of this name using the vowels of the Tetragrammaton according to the Masoretic text. Following a Jewish tradition of not pronouncing God's proper name, YHWH is generally translated in English bibles as "the LORD" or "GOD" in capital letters, just as in Jewish worship it is traditionally not pronounced but the word Adonai or Elohim ("God") is used instead.

The early Septuagint translation into Greek gives the meaning as "The Lord hath seen." One Latin version of the Christian Bible rendered the name in Latin as Dominus videt ("The LORD sees"). The King James Version follows this meaning.

Jewish translations of the verse into English state:

And Abraham called the name of that place Adonai-jireh; as it is said to this day: 'In the mount where the LORD is seen.'

However, some modern translations, like the New International Version, render it "the LORD will provide", amplifying the literal meaning along the lines of "the LORD will see to it", and referring to Abraham's earlier words in Genesis 22:8, "God himself will provide the lamb".

== Interpretation ==
Some Jewish commentators see the name as alluding to the future importance of the place as the site of Solomon's Temple. The Targumim do not regard "Jehovah-jireh" as a proper name.

Considering the passive construction of Abraham's words in verse 14, "In the mount of the LORD it shall be seen", Calvin comments that it teaches "that God not only looks upon those who are his, but also makes his help manifest to them...". John Wesley and Matthew Henry go further, suggesting that "perhaps it may refer to God manifest in the flesh".

In modern Christian interpretation, Jehovah Jireh embodies a belief in God's unwavering provision, echoing the story of Abraham and Isaac.

== Other modern usage ==
John Newton translates "Jehovah-jireh" as "The Lord will provide" in his hymn, "When Troubles Assail". It is also the title of a William Cowper hymn.

Jehovah Jireh is the title of an 1867 book by William Swan Plumer.

"Jehovah Jireh" is the title of several modern songs, including one by Don Moen included on his 1986 debut album Give Thanks; various others have covered it, including thrash metal band Deliverance on their 1989 self-titled debut album.

Chandra Currelley performed another song with the same title in the 2006 play What's Done in the Dark.

R&B singer Frank Ocean also uses the name "Jehovah Jireh" in his debut album/mixtape Nostalgia, Ultra in the song is titled 'We All Try".

Organizations bearing the name include Jehovah Jireh Children's Homes in Kenya, founded by Manasses Kuria, and churches such as Jehovah Jireh Samoan Assembly of God in Victorville, California, United States.

Maverick City Music and Elevation Worship released a song called "Jireh" in 2021.

== See also ==
- Jehovah-nissi
- Jehovah-shammah
- Penuel

== Notable people ==
- Jireh Swift Billings, son of Franklin S. Billings, Jr.
