= Names of God in Christianity =

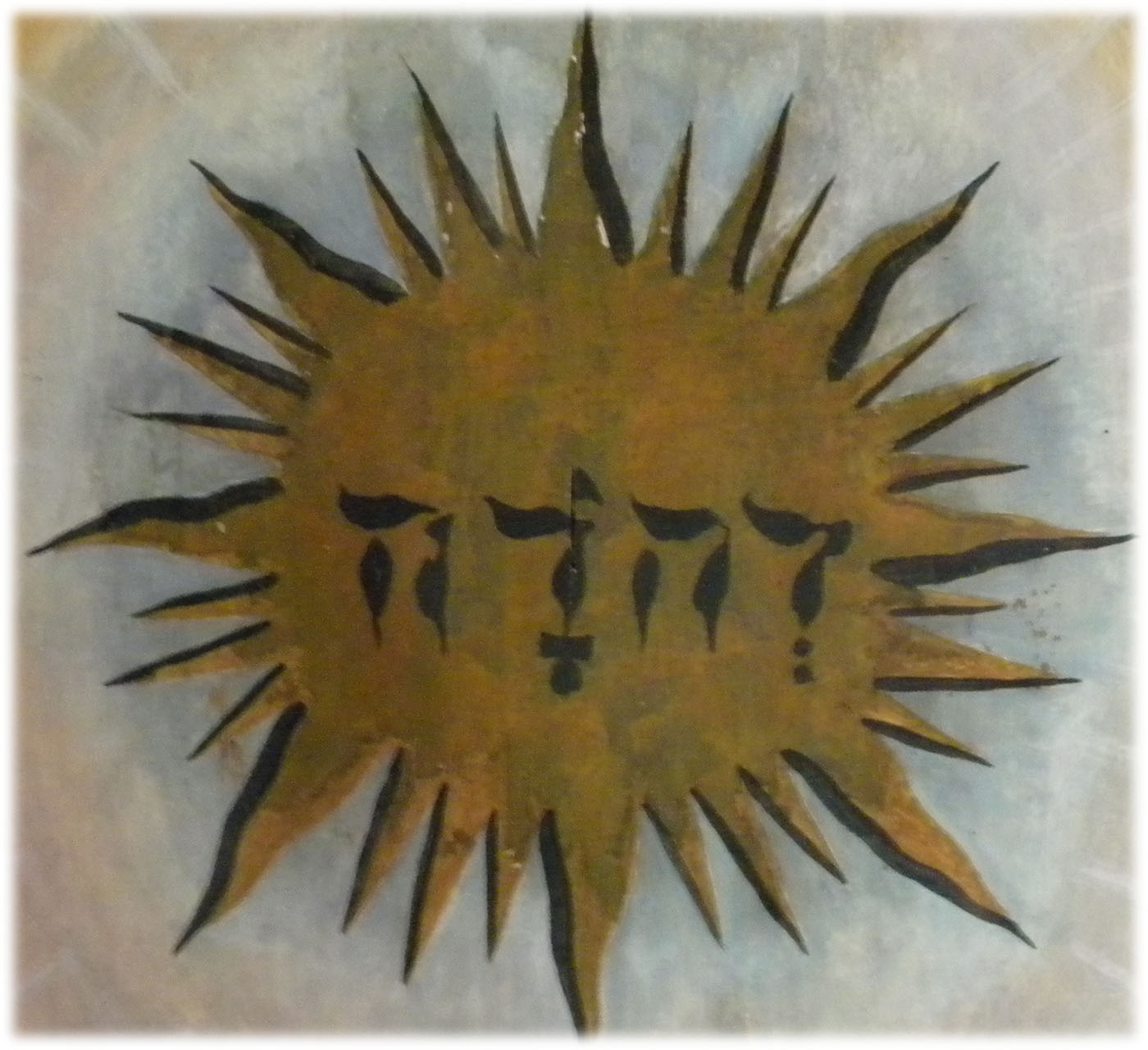
The Tetragrammaton YHWH, the name of God written in Hebrew, old church of Ragunda, Sweden

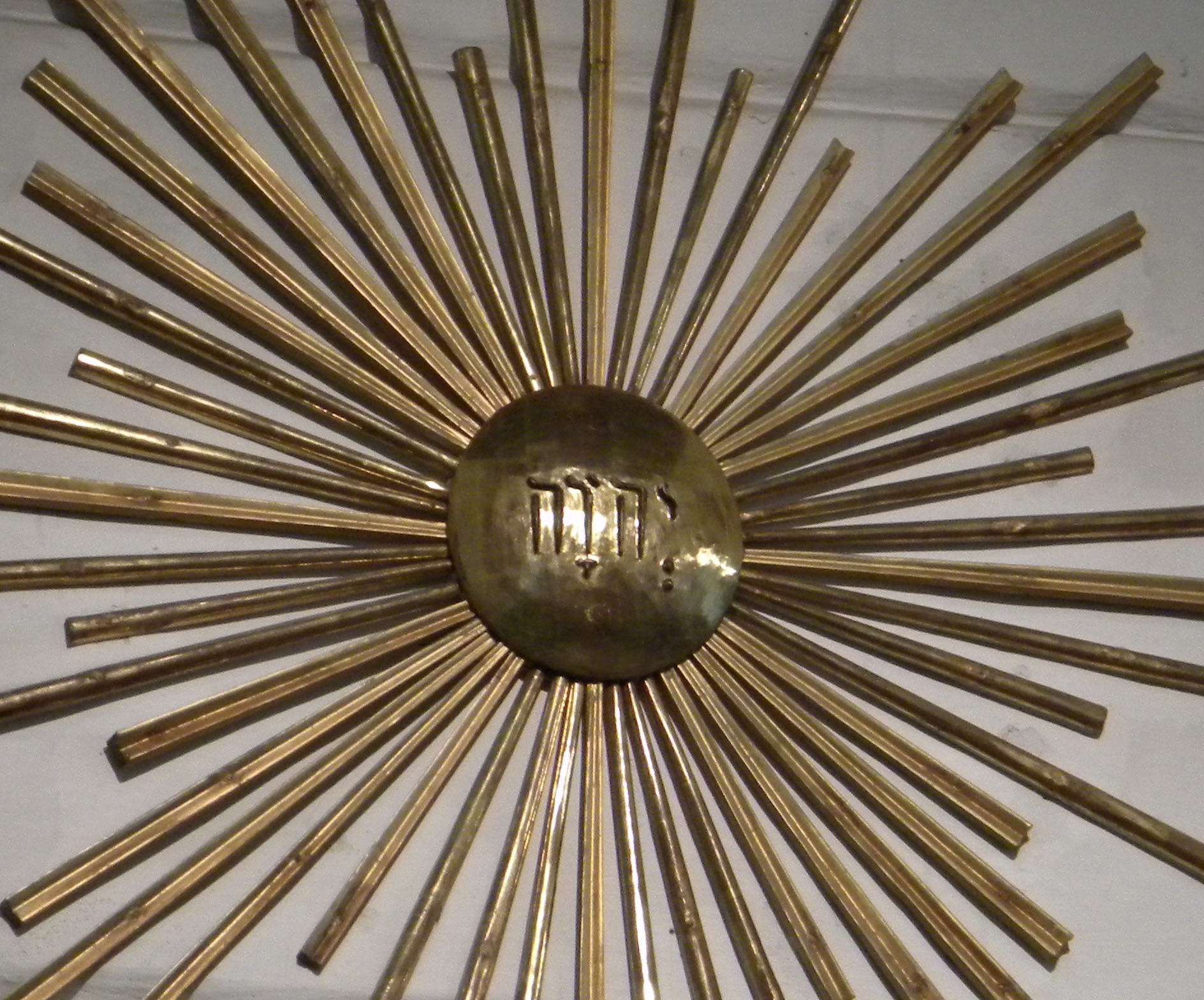
The Tetragrammaton YHWH, the name of God written in the Hebrew alphabet, All Saints Church, Nyköping, Sweden

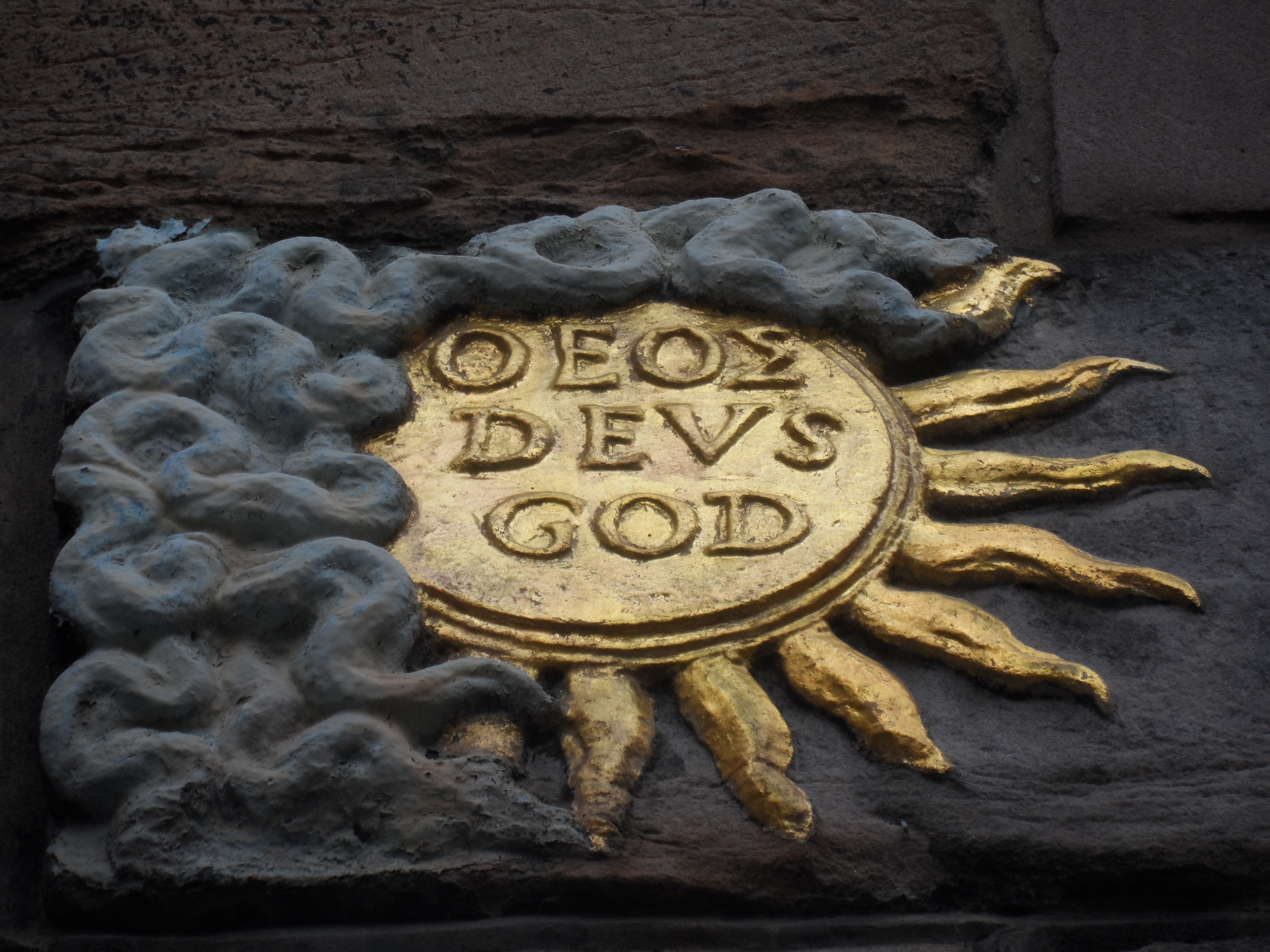
Names of God at John Knox House: "θεός, DEUS, GOD."

The Bible usually uses the name of God in the singular (e.g. Ex. 20:7 or Ps. 8:1), generally using the terms in a very general sense rather than referring to any special designation of God. However, general references to the name of God may branch to other special forms which express His multifaceted attributes. The Old Testament/Hebrew Bible reveals YHWH (often vocalized with vowels as "Yahweh" or "Jehovah") as the personal name of God, along with certain titles including El Elyon and El Shaddai. Jah or Yah is an abbreviation of Jahweh/Yahweh, and often sees usage by Christians in the interjection "Hallelujah", meaning "Praise Yah", which is used to give God glory. In the New Testament the terms Theos, Kyrios and Patēr (πατήρ i.e. Father in Greek) are additionally used to reference God.

Respect for the name of God is one of the Ten Commandments, which some Christian teachings interpret to be not only a command to avoid the improper use of God's name, but a directive to exalt it through both pious deeds and praise. This is reflected in the first petition in the Lord's Prayer addressed to God the Father: "Hallowed be Thy Name".

Going back to the Church Fathers, the name of God has been seen as a representation of the entire system of "divine truth" revealed to the faithful "that believe on his name" as in John 1:12 or "walk in the name of Jehovah our God" in Micah 4:5. In Revelation 3:12 those who bear the name of God are destined for the New Jerusalem; which will come down (to earth) from heaven. John 17:6 presents the teachings of Jesus as the manifestation of the name of God to his disciples.

John 12:28 presents the sacrifice of Jesus the Lamb of God, and the ensuing salvation delivered through it as the glorification of the name of God, with the voice from Heaven confirming Jesus' petition ("Father, glorify thy name") by saying: "I have both glorified it, and will glorify it again" referring to the baptism and crucifixion of Jesus.

== Old Testament ==
The simplest form by which God is referred to in the Old Testament is El (see proper names of earlier Canaanite gods). Elohim (singular Eloah) is likely derived from the same root and points to God as being strong and mighty, able to judge and to strike fear. Elyon refers to elevation and being exalted. These are, however, not proper names for God, but epithets also used for rulers and judges. Adonai has a similar context and refers to God as a powerful ruler. Similarly, El Shaddai, derived from "shad" i.e. Lord, also points to the power of God.

Yahweh is the principal name in the Old Testament by which God reveals himself and is the most sacred, distinctive and incommunicable name of God. Based on Lev, 24:16: "He that blasphemes the name of Yahweh shall surely be put to death", Jews generally avoided the use of Yahweh and substituted Adonai or Elohim for it when reading Scripture.

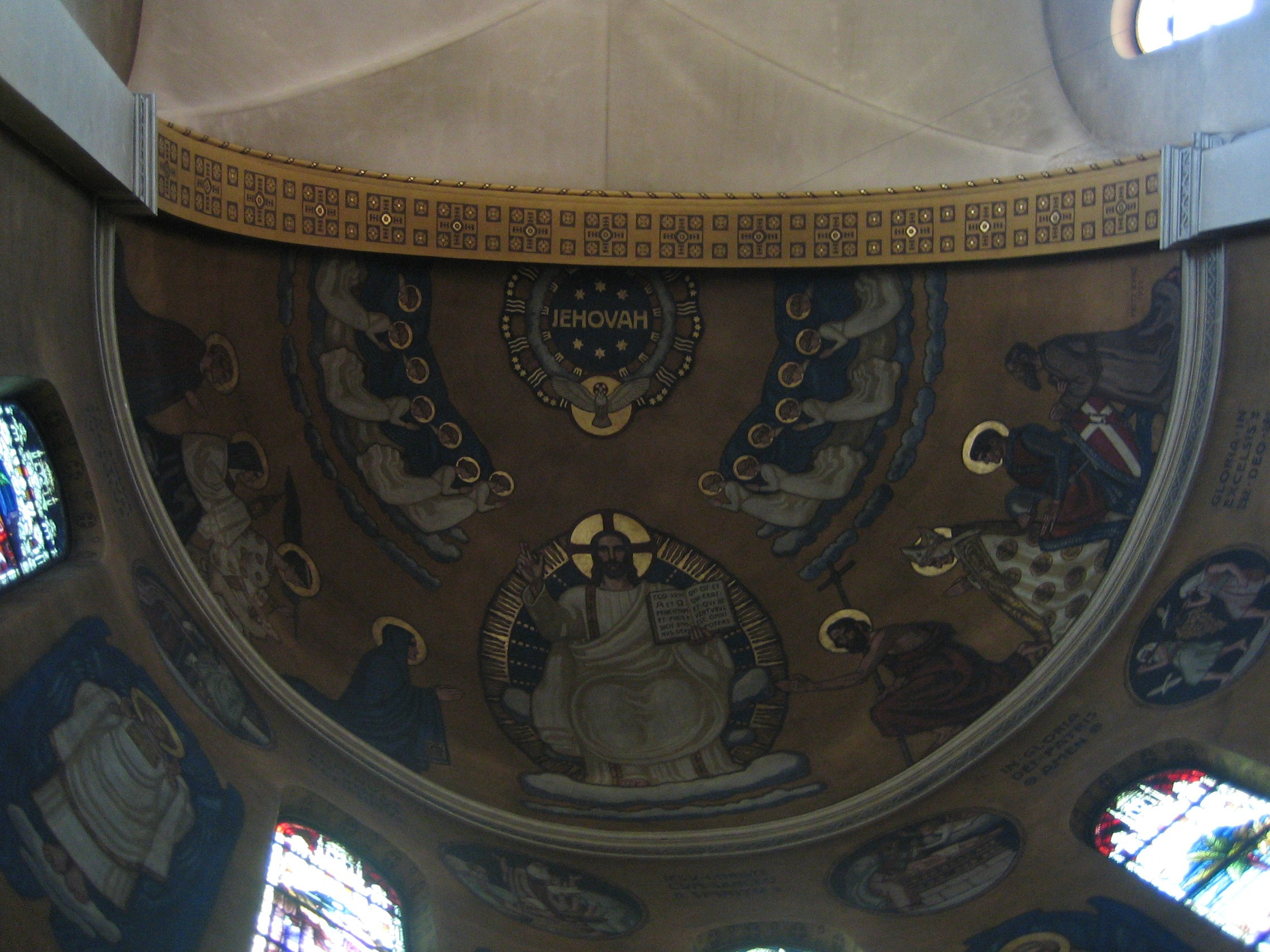
The name "Jehovah" on the dome of the Roman Catholic Saint Martin's Church in Olten, Switzerland, 1521

The pronunciation of YHWH in the Old Testament can never be certain, given that the original Hebrew text only used consonants. The English form Jehovah (יְהֹוָה, Yəhōwā) was formed during the Middle Ages by combining the Latinization of the four consonants YHWH with the vowel points that Masoretes used to indicate that the reader should say Adonai when YHWH was encountered. Thus Jehovah was obtained by adding the vowels of Adonai to the consonants of YHWH. Jehovah appears in Tyndale's Bible, the King James Version, and other translations from that time period and later. In Christianity, certain hymns dedicated to God invoke the divine name using the vocalization Jehovah, such as Guide Me, O Thou Great Jehovah. The Jehovah's Witnesses, a Restorationist denomination, make consistent use of Jehovah.

Jah or Yah is an abbreviation of Jahweh/Yahweh/Jehovah, and often sees usage by Christians in the interjection Hallelujah, meaning "Praise Jah", which is used to give God glory.

Many English translations of the Bible translate the Tetragrammaton as LORD, following the Jewish practice of substituting Adonai for it.

In the same sense as the substitution of Adonai, the Septuagint translation of the Hebrew Bible to Greek mainly used the word Kyrios (Greek: Κύριος, meaning 'lord') for YHWH. Apostle Paul was likely familiar with the use of the term Kyrios in the Septuagint and used it in his letters to refer to Jesus, thus signifying his divinity.

The pronouncement "I Am that I Am" in Exodus 3:14, in rabbinical scholarship taken as a gloss on the meaning of the Tetragrammaton, was in Hellenistic Judaism rendered as ἐγώ εἰμί ὁ ὢν. In the iconographic tradition of Eastern Christianity, it is common to depict Christ with a cruciform halo inscribed with the letters Ο, Ω, Ν for ὁ ὢν "He Who Is".

In Exodus 34:14, God does give his name as Jealous. "...for you shall worship no other god, because Jehovah, whose name is Jealous, is a jealous God." This highlights the idea that God's name is associated with his jealousy in the context of his demand for exclusive worship.

== New Testament ==
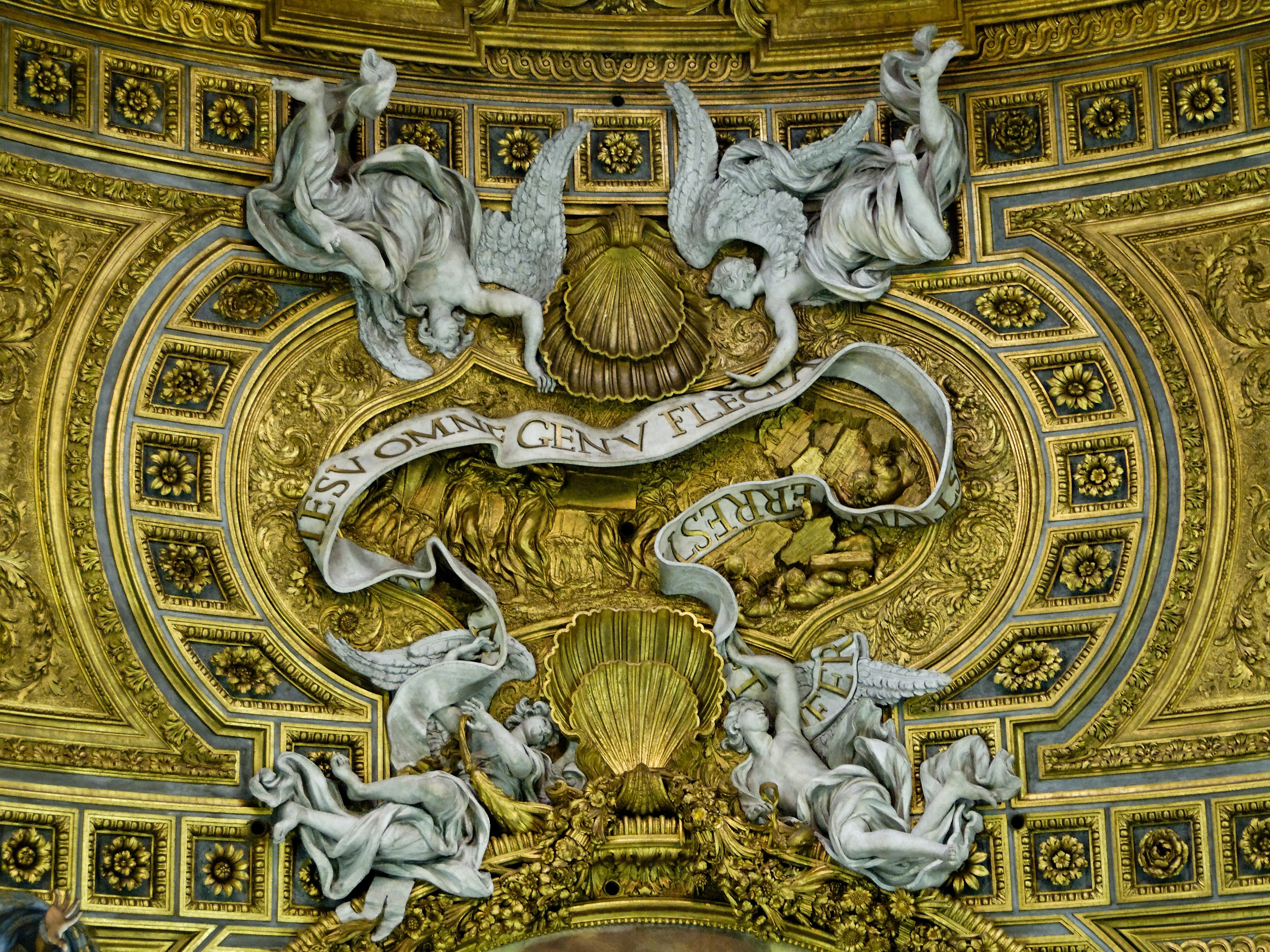
Latin inscription of Philippians 2:10: "At the name of Jesus every knee should bow", Church of the Gesù, Rome

While the Old Testament has a wide variety of names and epithets that refer to God in Hebrew, the Greek text of the New Testament uses far fewer variants.

The essential uses of the name of God the Father in the New Testament are Theos (θεός the Greek term for God), Kyrios (i.e. Lord in Greek) and Patēr (πατήρ i.e. Father in Greek). The Aramaic word "Abba" (אבא), meaning "Father" is used by Jesus in Mark 14:36 and also appears in Romans 8:15 and Galatians 4:6. St Paul refers to "the Father of mercies" in his Second Letter to the Corinthians, and St James refers to "the Father of lights" in his epistle.

In the New Testament the two names Jesus and Emmanuel, which refer to Jesus, have salvific attributes. The name Jesus is given in Luke 1:31 and Matthew 1:21 and in both cases the name is not selected by humans but is received by angelic messages with theological significance, e.g. the statement in Matthew 1:21 "you shall call His name Jesus, for He will save his people from their sins" associates salvific attributes to the name Jesus. Emmanuel, which appears in Matthew 1:23, may refer to Isaiah 7:14, and does not appear elsewhere in the New Testament, but in the context of Matthew 28:20 ("I am with you always, even unto the end of the world") indicates that Jesus will be with the faithful to the end of the age. According to Ulrich Luz, the Emmanuel motif brackets the entire Gospel of Matthew between 1:23 and 28:20, appearing explicitly and implicitly in several other passages, setting the tone for the salvific theme of Matthew.

The names of the Father, Son and the Holy Spirit are inherently related in the New Testament, e.g. with Jesus' instruction to His disciples at the end of the Gospel of Matthew (28:19): "make disciples of all the nations, baptizing them into the name of the Father and of the Son and of the Holy Spirit". The Greek word pneuma, generally translated spirit, is found around 385 times in the New Testament. The English terms Holy Spirit and Holy Ghost have identical meanings, with the former having become the usual term in the 20th century. Three separate terms, namely Holy Spirit, Spirit of Truth and Paraclete are used in the Johannine writings. The "Spirit of Truth" is used in John 14:17, 15:26 and 16:13. The First Epistle of John then contrasts this with the "spirit of error" in 1 John 4:6.

== Sanctity and power of the name ==
=== More than a name ===
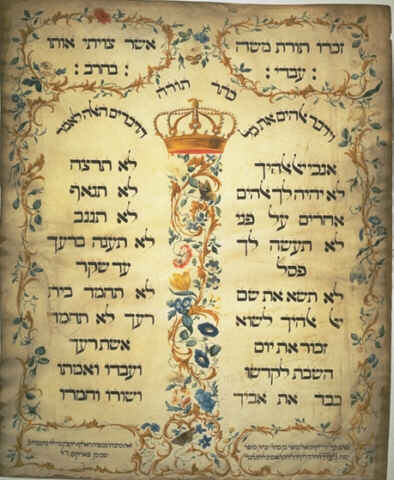
A parchment of the Ten Commandments, 1768, Jekuthiel Sofer.

Although in some modern cultures names are simply labels and designators that distinguish one item from another, in Christian theology the names of God have always had much deeper meaning and significance. In the religious sense, the names of God are not human inventions, but have divine origin and are based on divine revelation.

Veneration of the name of God goes back to the Old Testament, and as in Exodus 20:7, the Ten Commandments state: "You shall not make wrongful use of the name of the Lord your God". Christian teachings view this commandment as not simply an avoidance of the use of the name of God, but as a directive to exalt it, through both pious deeds and praise.

In Christian teachings, the name of God is not simply a label, but involves divine mysteries that require and preempt respect and praise. Louis Berkhof states that the issue surrounding the use and interpretation of the names of God provide a theological puzzle in that given that God is "infinite and incomprehensible", His names transcend human thought, yet they allow Him to be revealed to humans as he descends to what is finite and comprehensible. Thus the name of God has always been revered in the Christian tradition, and has been associated with His presence.

Other theologians (Pseudo-Dionysius the Areopagite, Thomas Aquinas, etc.) state that God has no name. Justin Martyr stated both that God has no name, and that God's name is Jesus.

=== Name of God, way of God ===
The traditions and the hymnody of Christian liturgy have for long emphasized the importance of acting in the name of God, e.g. the Sanctus (which may go) states: "Blessed is he who comes in the name of the Lord".

Going back to Church Fathers such as Justin Martyr or Cyril of Alexandria, in Christian teachings the name of God has been seen as a representation of the entire system of "divine truth" revealed to the faithful "that believe on his name" as in John 1:12 or "walk in the name of the Lord our God" in Micah 4:5. This is further shown in Jesus' Farewell Discourse to his disciples at the end of the Last Supper, in which he addresses the Father and in John 17:6 and 17:26 states:

"I manifested Thy name unto the men whom Thou gavest me out of the world." (17:6)
"I made known unto them Thy name, and will make it known" (17:26)

In Revelation 3:12 those who bear the name of God are destined for the New Jerusalem; which will come down (to earth) from heaven. In Christian teachings, although the people of God bear the name of God, even they can offend the name of God by transgressing against the nature of God, and disobeying his commandments, as in Romans 2:24: "For the name of God is blasphemed among the Gentiles because of you, even as it is written.".

=== Hallowed be thy name ===
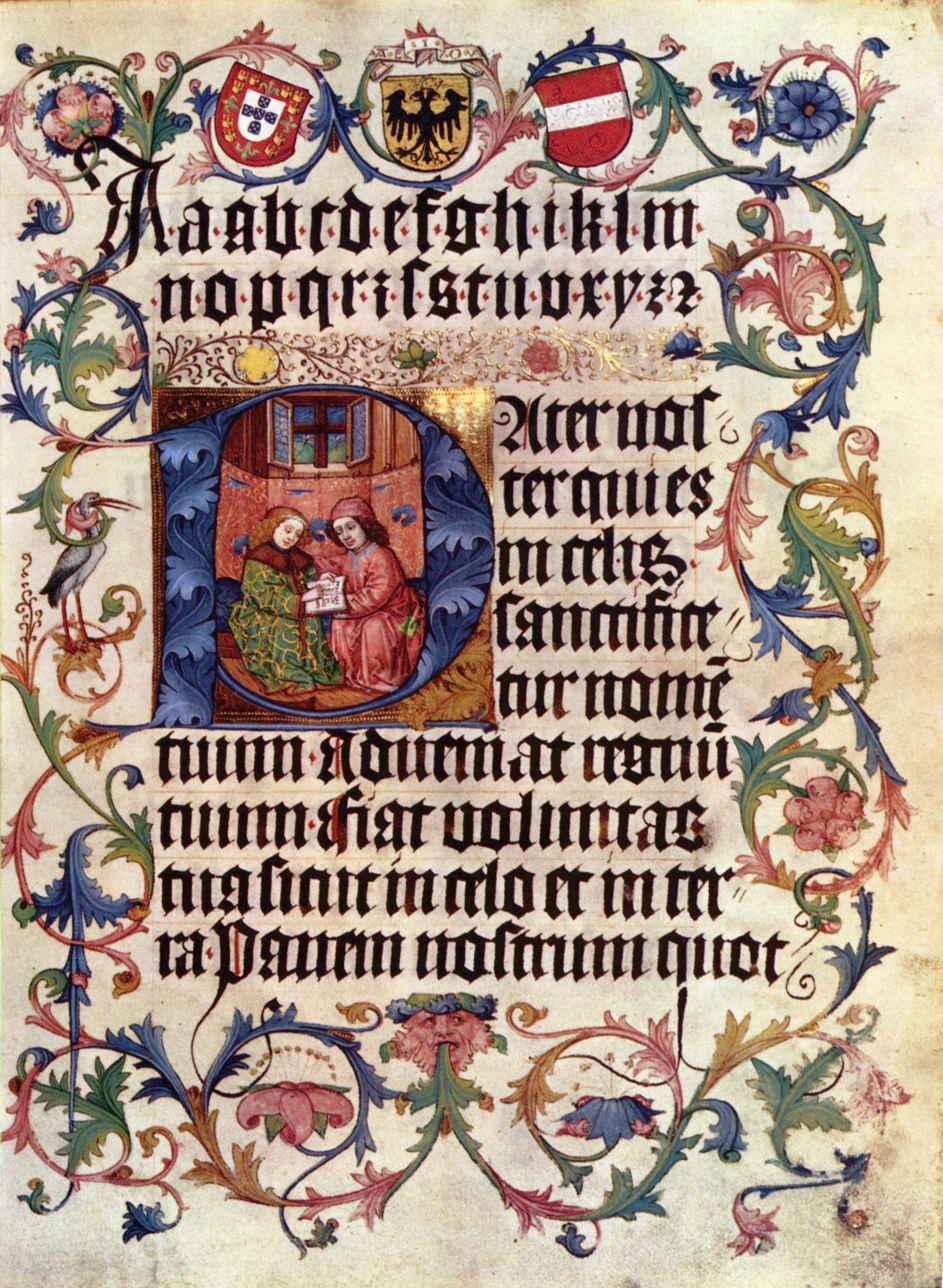
The Lord's Prayer, in Matthew 6:9, 1500, Vienna

The first petition in the Lord's Prayer is "hallowed be thy name" and is addressed to "Our Father who art in Heaven". In his 4th century sermon "Hallowed be Thy Name, Thy Kingdom Come", Gregory of Nyssa referred to Romans 2:24 and Ezekiel 36:23 which states:

And I will sanctify my great name, which hath been profaned among the nations, which ye have profaned in the midst of them; and the nations shall know that I am Yahweh, saith the Lord Yahweh, when I shall be sanctified in you before their eyes.

Gregory stated that the petition that starts the Lord's Prayer deals with the insults, disregard, and inattention to the honor of God's name and seeks to remedy that through the pious actions of believers. Modern Christian theology has continued that teaching, and also adds that the remedy also involves the judgement of God against those who disrespect his name.

In John 12:28 Jesus submits a petition to the Father and receives a response:

Father, glorify thy name. There came therefore a voice out of heaven, saying, I have both glorified it, and will glorify it again.

The first glorification refers to Matthew 3:17: "This is my beloved Son, in whom I am well pleased." at the start of the ministry of Jesus with his baptism, and the second to his upcoming crucifixion. Thus in John 12:30 Jesus explains to the crowd who hear the voice: "This voice hath not come for My sake, but for your sakes", referring to his crucifixion as the key element of the path to salvation.

Other prayers in various Christian traditions have continued to refer to the name of God, e.g. the Catholic Golden Arrow prayer begins with:

May the most holy, most sacred, most adorable, most incomprehensible and ineffable Name of God be forever praised, blessed, loved, adored and glorified in Heaven, on earth, and under the earth, by all the creatures of God

The widespread use of the Jesus Prayer in the Eastern Orthodox Church has also been associated with the power of the name of God, with continuing theological discussions.

== See also ==
- Attributes of God in Christianity
- Imiaslavie
- Names of God
- Names of God in Zoroastrianism
- Names of God in Islam
- Names of God in Judaism
- Names of God in Sikhism
- Theonym
