= El Roi =

One of the names of God in the Hebrew Bible

El Roi (Biblical Hebrew: אֵל רֳאִי, romanized: ʾĒl Rŏʾī) is one of the names of God in the Hebrew Bible meaning "The God who sees me" or "The God who sees". This name appears in the Book of Genesis, specifically in Genesis 16:13, and is of particular interest because it is spoken by Hagar, an Egyptian servant of Sarai (Sarah), Abraham's wife.

== Context ==
In Genesis 16, Sarai, the wife of Abram (later Abraham), is barren. She suggests that Abram takes Hagar as a concubine, but after Hagar becomes pregnant she begins to experience mistreatment and jealousy from Sarai. Feeling oppressed, Hagar flees into the wilderness.

There, an angel of the Lord appears to her near a spring and tells her to return to Sarai, while also delivering a prophecy that her son, Ishmael, will become the father of a great nation. After this encounter, Hagar is deeply moved, and she says:

"You are the God who sees me", for she said, "I have now seen the One who sees me." (Genesis 16:13, NIV)

Hagar then says to "the LORD who spoke to her, "You are El Roi", recognizing that even as a lowly, mistreated servant, she was seen and acknowledged by God. This is profound because it shows a deeply personal and intimate understanding of God’s attention and care, even for someone on the margins.

The biblical account relates El roi to the name of the place where Hagar met the angel: "Wherefore the well was called 'Beer-lahai-roi'; behold, it is between Kadesh and Bered".

== Translations ==
In Jewish writings, Rashi translates El roi as "god of sight", Joseph b. Isaac Bekhor Shor translates it "god saw me", Abraham Ibn Ezra, Bahya b. Asher, and Obadiah b. Jacob Sforno, "god who appears", David Kimhi, "god I saw" or "visible god", and Levi b. Gershon as "all-seeing god".

In English bibles, the English Standard Version says "You are a God of seeing", and the New King James Version has "You-Are-the-God-Who-Sees". The Common English Bible and the Jerusalem Bible retain the untranslated wording "El Roi".
