= Jehovah-shammah =

Christian transliteration of a Hebrew phrase

Jehovah-shammah is a Christian transliteration of the Hebrew יְהוָה שָׁמָּה (Yahweh šāmmāh) meaning "Jehovah is there", the name given to the city in Ezekiel's vision in Ezekiel 48:35. These are the final words of the Book of Ezekiel. The first word of the phrase is the tetragrammaton יהוה. Jehovah is a Christian anglicized vocalization of this name.

== Christian interpretation ==
Easton's Bible Dictionary identifies the city in Ezekiel's vision as Jerusalem, and as a type of the gospel Church.

Commentaries such as that of Matthew Henry draw attention to the similarities of the vision of the holy city, the new Jerusalem, in the closing chapters of the Christian Bible, Revelation 21–22; these include the square plan, the twelve gates, and the presence of God. Jehovah-Shammah is therefore understood not merely as a name but as a description of the future reality.

Charles Spurgeon preached his New Year sermon in 1891 on this text in Ezekiel, declaring:

It is esteemed by the prophet to be the highest blessing that could come upon a city that its name should be, JEHOVAH-SHAMMAH, The Lord is there.

The phrase is also the title of a hymn written by William Cowper in the Olney Hymns.

== See also ==
- Jehovah-jireh
- Jehovah-nissi
