= Charlotte Gordon =

American writer

- Born: 1962 (age 63–64); St. Louis, Missouri, United States
- Education: Harvard University (BA); Boston University (PhD)
- Occupation: Writer
- Writing career
- Notable works: Romantic Outlaws: The Extraordinary Lives of Mary Wollstonecraft and Mary Shelley (2015)
- Notable awards: Massachusetts Book Award; National Book Critics Circle Award
- Website: charlottegordonbooks.com

Charlotte Gordon (born 1962) is an American writer, distinguished professor of humanities at Endicott College, and winner of the National Book Critics Circle Award in nonfiction for her book Romantic Outlaws: The Extraordinary Lives of Mary Wollstonecraft and Mary Shelley (2015). Awarded a grant] from the National Endowment for the Humanities, Gordon is the director of the Tadler Center at Endicott College.

== Life ==
She was born in St. Louis, Missouri, United States, in 1962, and received her BA degree in English and American literature from Harvard College. She received her MA in creative writing and her PhD in literature from Boston University.

She was awarded the Massachusetts Book Award for non-fiction for her biography of the poet Anne Bradstreet, Mistress Bradstreet: The Untold Life of America's First Poet. This was followed by The Woman Who Named God: Abraham's Dilemma and the Birth of Three Faiths, which in the author's own words describes the "shadows, gaps and silences" in the biblical texts about Abraham, Sarah, and Hagar. Examining them as stories, and drawing on the Bible both as a source of literature and religion, she notes that "some of the most crucial western ideas about freedom come from Hagar". Gordon was the 2012 Rose Thering Fellow from the Lubar Institute for her work exploring interfaith issues.

Her 2015 book Romantic Outlaws: The Extraordinary Lives of Mary Wollstonecraft and Mary Shelley is about the mother and daughter pair of writers. The first Mary died giving birth to the second in 1797, and, according to The Independent, "Gordon sheds new light on these visionary women who believed in making their own rules." It was named a Book of the Year by The London Times, a New York Times notable book, and favourably reviewed in Vogue, the Boston Globe, the Seattle Times, The Wall Street Journal, and many others. Romantic Outlaws was the BBC Radio 4 Book of the Week on August 10, 2015, and won the 2016 National Book Critics Circle Award. Gordon is also the author of Mary Shelley: A Very Short Introduction (2022), part of the Oxford University Press series, and wrote the "Introduction" to Mary Shelley's Frankenstein: The 1818 Text.

Gordon's new book, I Speak of Wrongs, tells the story of the rise and fall of the 19th-century women's movement.

== See also ==
- Lyndall Gordon, also a literary biographer of Wollstonecraft (2005) and of mother-daughter pairs
