= Names of God in Sikhism =

Names of God in Sikhism are names attributed to God in Sikhism by Sikh gurus.

== List ==
Below is a list of some names used by Sikhs for God:

No.	Gurmukhi	Romanization [variant spellings]	Translation	Reference(s)
Names of Indic origin:
1.	ਵਾਹਿਗੁਰੂ	Waheguru [Vaheguru]	Wonderful Enlightener	
2.	ਅਕਾਲ ਪੁਰਖ	Akal Purakh	The Timeless Being	
3.	ੴ (ਇੱਕ ਓਅੰਕਾਰ)	Ik Onkar [Ek Onkar]	One Creator	
4.	ਨਿਰੰਕਾਰ	Nirankar	Formless	
5.	ਸਤਿ ਨਾਮੁ	Satnam	True Name	
6.	ਪਰਮੇਸ਼ੁਰ	Parmeshur [Parameshwara]	Supreme Lord	
7.	ਪੁਰੁਸ਼/ਪੁਰਖ	Purusha/Purakh	Being	
8.	ਹਰਿ	Hari	Seizer (of sin)	
9.	ਮੋਹਨ	Mohan	Charming, Enchanting or Captivating	
10.	ਜਗਦੀਸ਼	Jagdish	Lord of the World	
11.	ਕ੍ਰਿਸ੍ਨ	Krishan [Krishna]	Black	
12.	ਕਰਣਹਾਰ	Karanhar	Helmsman	
13.	ਗੋਬਿੰਦ	Gobind [Govind]	Cow Herder	
14.	ਅਲਖ	Alakh	Unperceivable	
15.	ਅਗਮ	Agam	Unaccessible	
16.	ਰਾਮ	Rama [Raam]	Dark	
17.	ਮਹਾਰਾਜਾ	Maharaja	Great King	
18.	ਚੱਕਰ ਚੱਕਰਵਰਤੀ	Chakara Cakaravaratī	Universal Wheel Turning Emperor	
19	ਠਾਕੁਰ	Thakur	Lord	
20	ਨਾਰਾਇਣ	Narayana	Lord	
21	ਜਗਦੀਸੁਰ	Jagadeeshwara	Lord of World	
22	ਮਾਧਵ	Maadhav	Lord of Wealth	
23	ਗੋਵਰਧਨ ਧਾਰੀ	Govardhan Dhaaree	Uplifter of mountains	
24	ਮੁਰਲੀ ਮਨੋਹਰ	Murlee Manohar	Joyful Lord	
25	ਬਾਸੁਦੇਵ	Vasudev	Lord	
26	ਭਗਵਾਨੁ /ਭਗਵੰਤਾ	Bhagwaan/Bhagvanta	Lord	
Names of Islamic and Persian origin:
1.	ਅਲਹੁ	Allah	The God	
2.	ਰੱਬ	Rabb [Raab]	Lord	
3.	ਖੁਦਾ	Khuda	Lord	
4.	ਰਹੀਮ	Rahim [Raheem]	Merciful	
5.	ਕਰੀਮ	Karim [Kareem]	Generous	
6.	ਸਾਹਿਬ	Sahib	Companion	
7.	ਖਡੂਰ	Kadur [Khadur]		
8.	ਸੱਚਾ ਪਾਤਿਸ਼ਾਹ	Sache Patishah	True Master King	
9.	ਸ਼ਹਿਨਸ਼ਾਹ	Shahenshah	King of kings	

== Meaning and usage ==
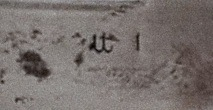
Allah (Arabic: الله) inscribed in Perso-Arabic script on the purported tegha sword of Guru Gobind Singh

The various names for God in Sikhism may stem from either the Indic traditions or the Islamic one. Others are unique to the Sikh tradition, such as Waheguru, Akal Purakh, and Sarabloh. Employment of these terms does not mean Sikhs accept the religious context in which they are understood in their original sources. For example, the meaning of the words Hari or Ram as used by Sikhs does not mean the same thing as these terms do in the Hindu (particularity Vaishnav) traditions. Usage of these names does not mean Sikhs conceptualize their concept of God in the form of the incarnated devas or devis from Indic mythology, but rather they are used to describe various aspects of God as per Sikh theology.

The Sikh gurus adopted the names for the divine from various faith systems as they saw these sectarian differences in linguistics as unimportant in-comparison to the actual message they were trying to spread. On page 64 of the Guru Granth Sahib, various Islamicate terms for God are also presented freely.

Your names are countless. I do not know their end, but I am sure that there is no one else like you.

— Guru Granth Sahib, page 877

The Sikh Rehat Maryada produced by the Shiromani Gurdwara Parbandhak Committee proposes to use the term Akal Purakh as the paramount/formal Sikh term for God, despite there being variations of this name found in the compositions authored by Guru Nanak which were employed far more commonly than Akal Purakh (used only once by Nanak), with variations being Adi Purakh (used twelve times) and Karta Purakh (used three times). Furthermore, other terms for god, sourced from Arabic or Persian, that were used by Nanak were even more commonly used, such as Sahib (hundred-and-thirty-seven times), Khasam (seventy-eight times), or Patishah (twenty-three times).

== See also ==
- Names of God in Hinduism
- Names of God in Islam
- Names of God in Christianity
- Names of God in Judaism
- Names of God in Zoroastrianism
- Naam Japo
