= Jehovah-nissi =

In Exodus, an altar built by Moses

According to Exodus 17:13–16 in the Bible, Jehovah-nissi (Hebrew: יְהוָה נִסִּי Adonây nissî) is the name given by Moses to the altar which he built to celebrate the defeat of the Amalekites at Rephidim.

== Translations ==
The first word of the phrase is the Tetragrammaton יהוה, one of the names of God in Judaism. It is generally translated in English Bibles as "the LORD", Jehovah, or Yahweh.

The Septuagint translators believed nis·si′ to be derived from nus (flee for refuge) and rendered it "the Lord My Refuge", while in the Vulgate it was thought to be derived from na·sas′ (hoist; lift up) and was rendered "Jehovah Is My Exaltation".

In many modern Christian translations, such as the New International Version, the name is translated “the LORD is my banner."

== Interpretation ==
The chapter recounts that Israel had the advantage over Amalek as long as Moses, watching the battle from a vantage point, held his staff aloft.

Matthew Henry considered that Jehovah-nissi (The Lord is my banner) "probably refers to the lifting up of the rod of God as a banner in this action. The presence and power of Jehovah were the banner under which they enlisted, by which they were animated and kept together, and therefore which they erected in the day of their triumph."

== See also ==
- Jehovah-jireh
- Jehovah-shammah
