= Hagar =

Biblical character

- הגר
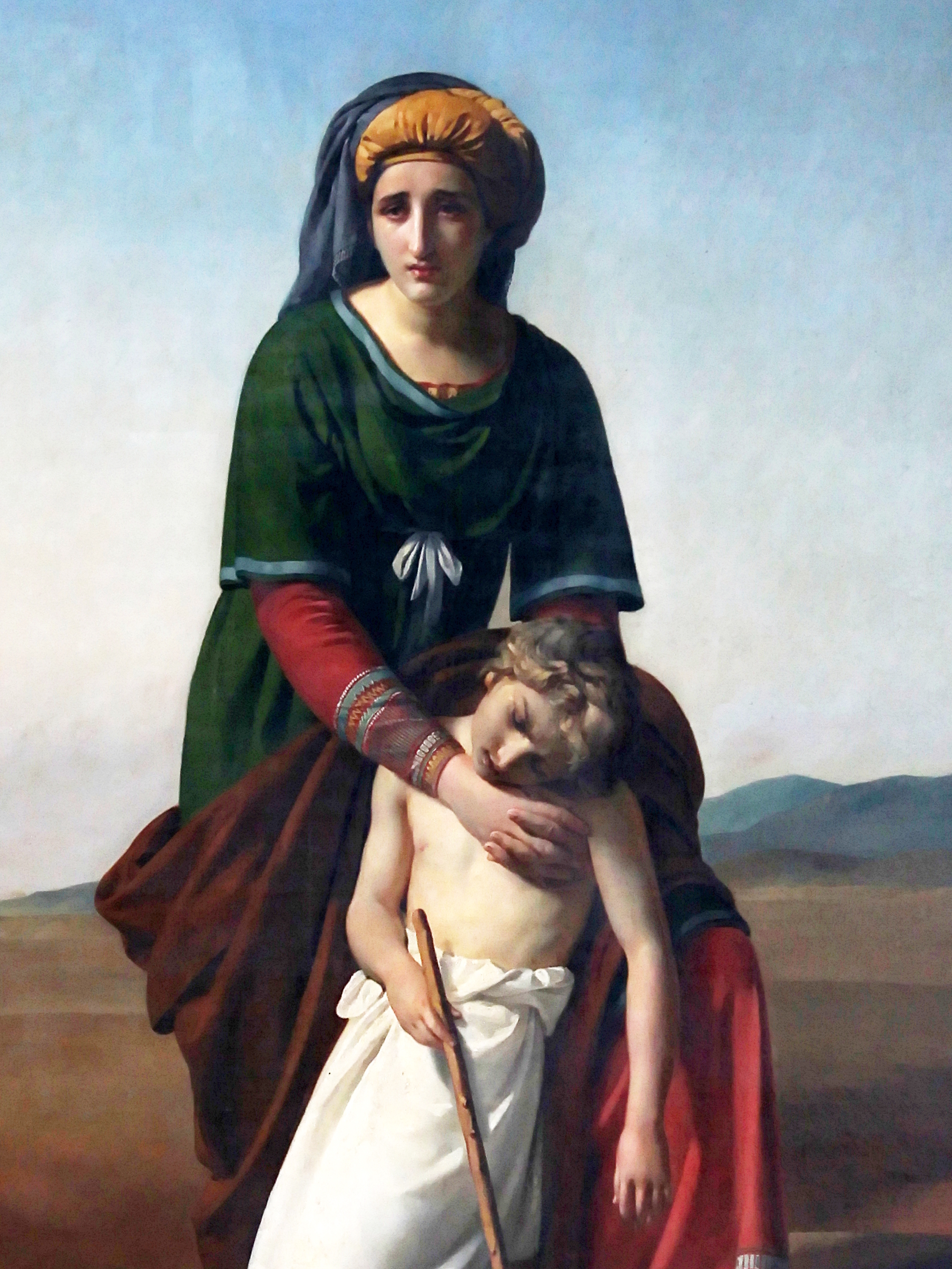
- A depiction of Hagar and her son Ishmael in the desert (1819) by François-Joseph Navez
- Born: Egypt
- Died: Mecca (according to Islam), unknown (according to Judaism and Christianity)
- Other name: Hājar
- Spouse: Abraham (according to Islam)
- Children: Ishmael (son)
- Relatives: Salih (forefather; according to the Islamic tradition)

Hagar and Ishmael's farewell to Abraham and Sarah. A camel caravan waits in the background.

According to the Book of Genesis, Hagar (Note: /ˈheɪɡɑːr/ HAY-gar; Biblical Hebrew: הָגָר, romanized: Hāgār, of uncertain origin, although one rabbinic source states that Ha-Agar means 'this is reward"; Arabic: هَاجَر, romanized: Hājar; Ancient Greek: Ἁγάρ, romanized: Hagár; Latin: Agar.) is an Egyptian woman, concubine of Abraham. Abraham's firstborn son through Hagar, Ishmael, became the progenitor of the Ishmaelites, generally taken to be the Arabs. Various commentators have connected her to the Hagrites (sons of Agar), perhaps claiming her as their eponymous ancestor. Hagar is alluded to, although not named, in the Quran, and Islam considers her Abraham's second wife.

== Biblical narrative ==
=== Abram, Sarai, Hagar and the angel ===
According to the Bible, Hagar was the Egyptian woman, Abram's wife (whose names later became Sarah and Abraham). Sarai regarded herself as barren and sought a way to fulfil God's previous promise that Abram would have descendants. Since she had grown old, she offered Hagar as a concubine to Abram.

Hagar became pregnant and tension arose between the two women. Genesis states that when she knew she was pregnant, Hagar began to despise Sarai. Sarai complained to Abram who said "Your servant is in your hands, do with her whatever you think best". Then Sarai mistreated Hagar, so Hagar fled from her.

Hagar fled into the desert on her way to Shur. At a spring en route, an angel of the LORD appeared to Hagar and instructed her to return to Sarai and to submit to her mistress. In wording which "mirrors the covenantal blessings given to Abram", the angel promises Hagar that her offspring will multiply and become uncountable.

Then she was told by the angel that she would give birth to a son and that she should call her son "Ishmael". Afterward, Hagar referred to God as "El Roi" (variously "god of sight"; "god saw me"; "god who appears"). She then returned to Abram and Sarai, and soon gave birth to a son, whom she named as the angel had instructed.

=== Hagar cast out ===
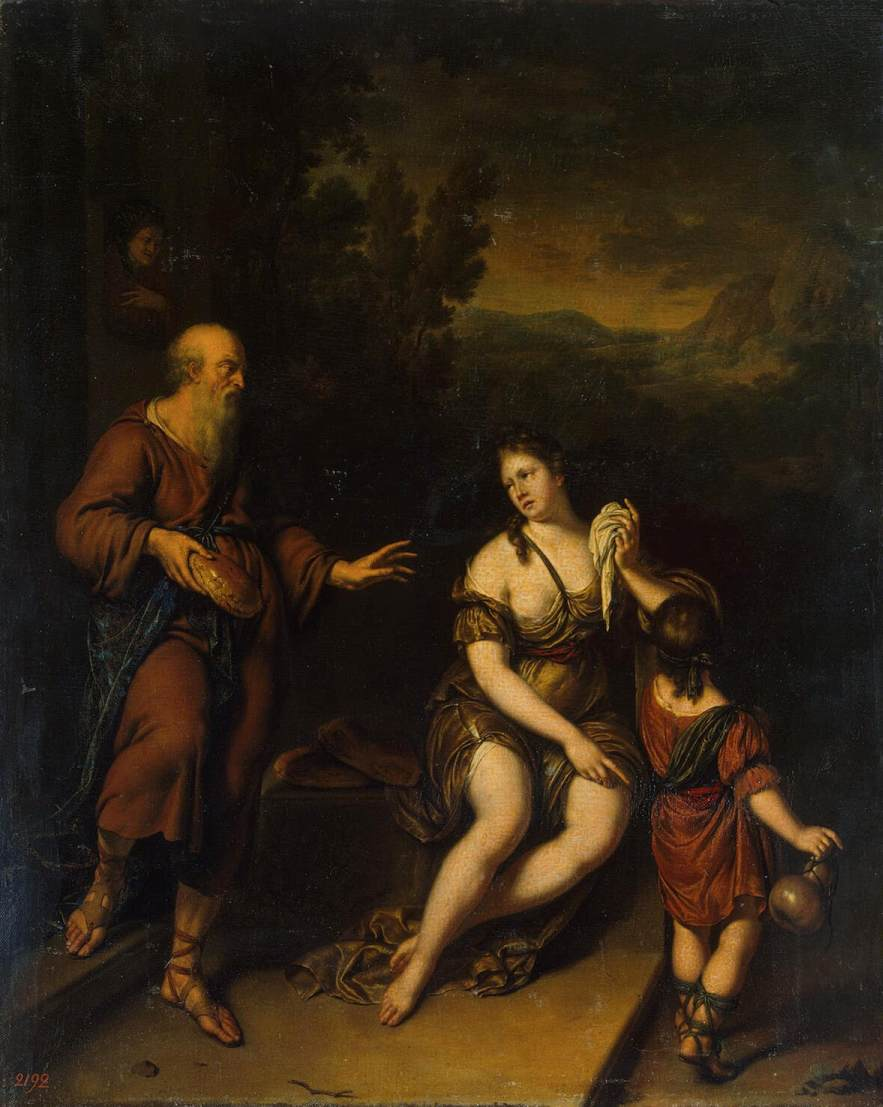
Abraham and his family on their way

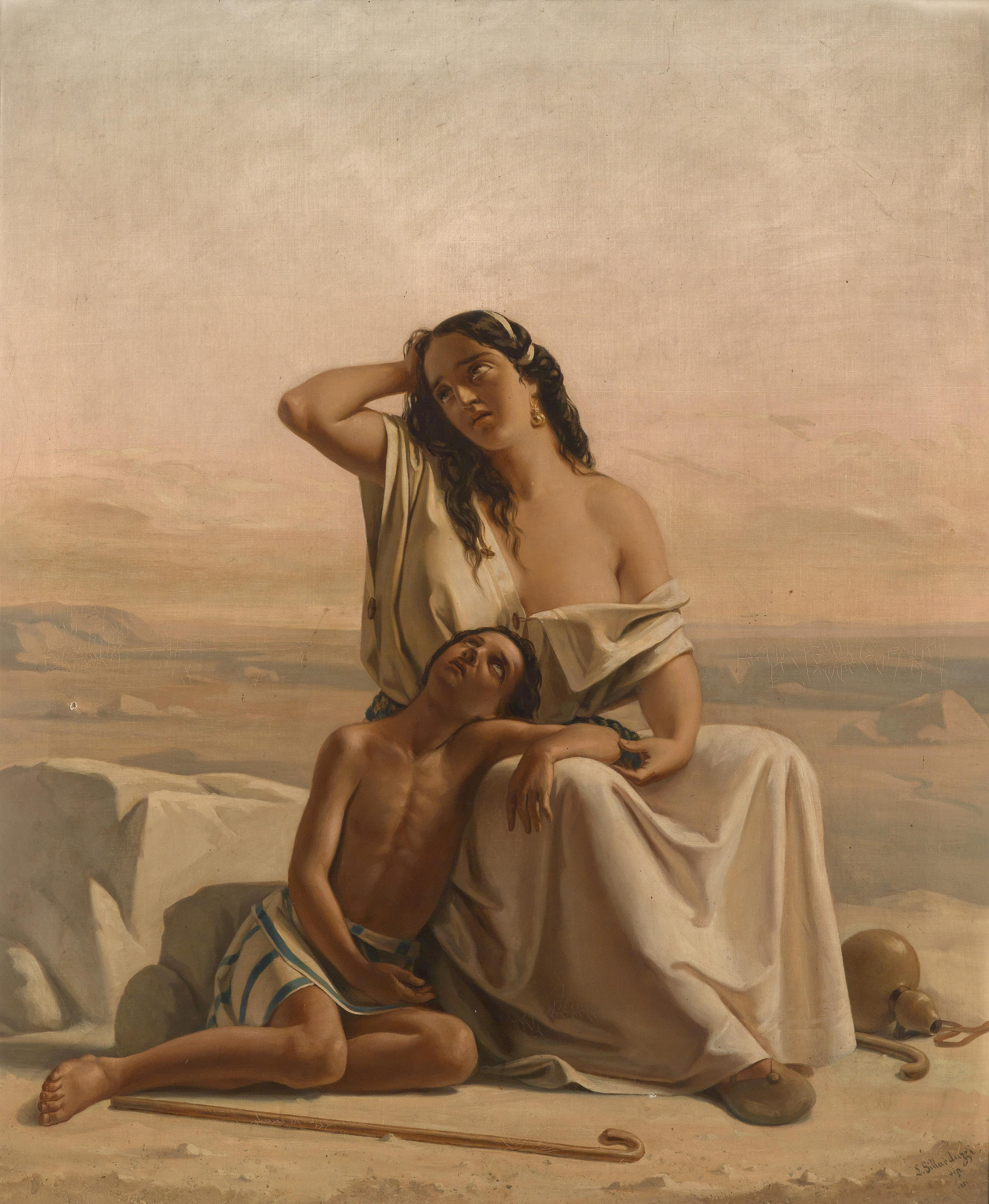
Hagar and Ishmael in the desert

Later, Sarah gave birth to Isaac, and the tension between the women returned. At a celebration after Isaac was weaned, Sarah found the teenage Ishmael mocking her son (Genesis 21:9). She was so upset by the idea of Ishmael inheriting their wealth that she demanded that Abraham send Hagar and her son away. She declared that Ishmael would not share in Isaac's inheritance. Abraham was greatly distressed, but God told Abraham to do as his wife commanded because God's promise would be carried out through Isaac; Ishmael would be made into a great nation as well because he was Abraham's offspring. Abraham brought Hagar and Ishmael out together. Abraham gave Hagar bread and water then sent them into the wilderness of Beersheba. She and her son wandered aimlessly until their water was completely consumed. In a moment of despair, she burst into tears. God heard her son crying and came to rescue them. The angel opened Hagar's eyes and she saw a well of water. He also told Hagar that God would "make a great nation" of Ishmael. Hagar found her son a wife from Egypt and they settled in the Desert of Paran.

=== Sayings of Agur ===
A verse in the Sayings of Agur (Proverbs 30:23) has been associated with Hagar: "[Under three things the earth trembles, under four it cannot bear up]: ... a maidservant when she displaces her mistress". The Septuagint has this wording, whereas the Masoretic text refers to a maid "inheriting from her mistress". John Gill observes that such a servant "might be exemplified in the case of Hagar, the bondmaid of Sarah, a type of those that are under the law of works, and seek the inheritance by it; and who trust in themselves that they are righteous, and despise others."

== Islamic narrative ==
Hagar does not directly appear in the Quran, but she features in various Islamic traditions, which do not portray her as a slave but as a maid (of Sarah or of Abraham) named Hājar.

The Islamic narrative slightly differs from the biblical account, in that it is God alone who commands Abraham to take Hagar and Ishmael down to the desert, later Mecca, and leave them there. Due to the scarcity of water in the desert, it did not take long for both mother and son to suffer from a great thirst, and so Hagar ran between the hills of Safa and Marwah in search of water for her son. After the seventh run between the two hills, an angel appeared before her. He helped her and said that God heard Ishmael cry and would provide them with water, and Hagar found the sacred Zamzam Well. Mecca was later known for its perfection and abundance of water, and an Arab tribe called the Banu Jurhum settled there with Hagar and her son Ishmael, because of the presence of the water.

== Religious views ==
=== Rabbinical commentary ===
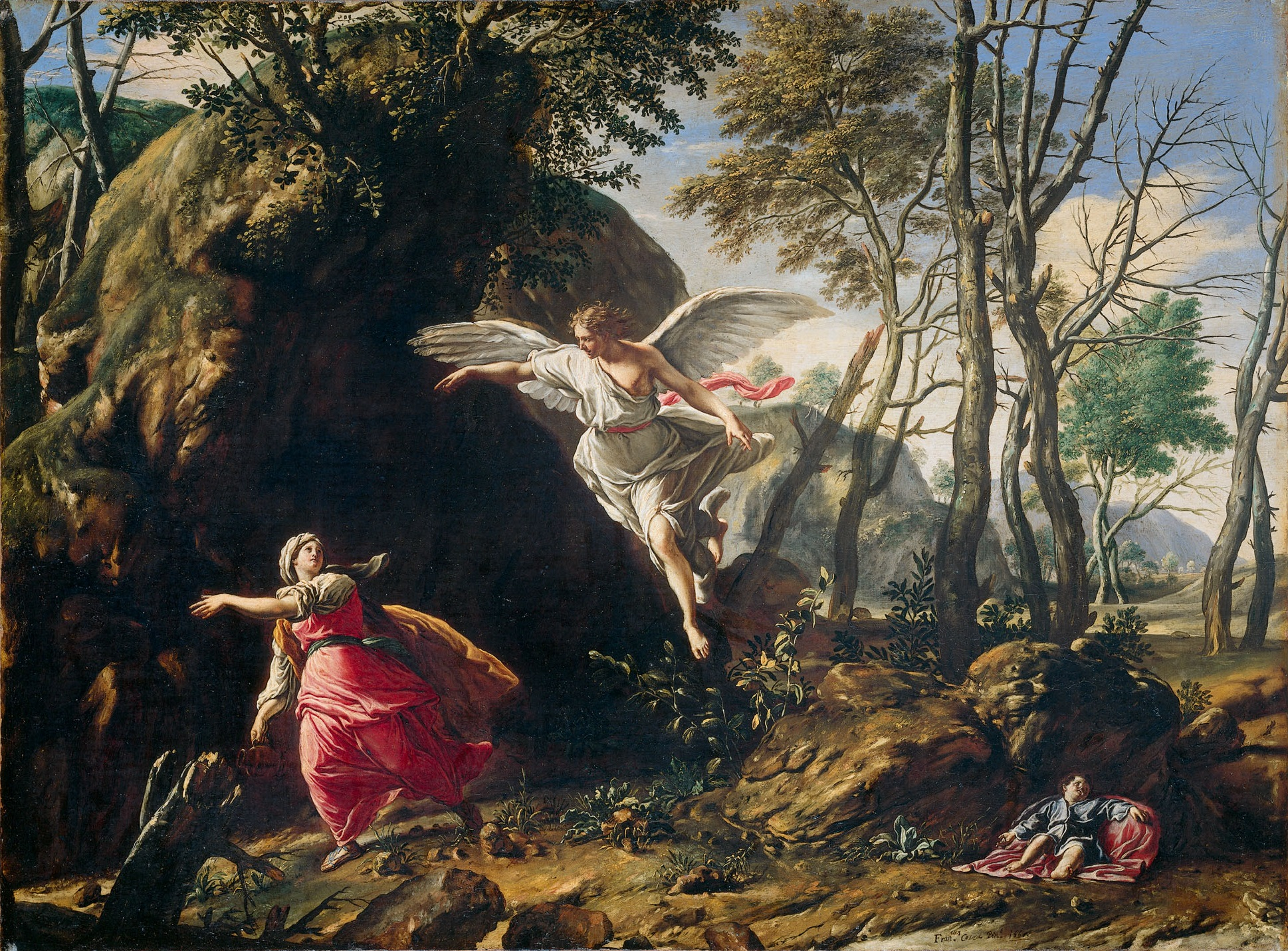
Hagar and the Angel in the Wilderness, by Francesco Cozza

Rabbinical commentators asserted that Hagar was Pharaoh's daughter. The midrash Genesis Rabbah states it was when Sarah was in Pharaoh's harem that he gave her his daughter Hagar as servant, saying: "It is better that my daughter should be a servant in the house of such a woman than mistress in another house." Sarah treated Hagar well, and induced women who came to visit her to also visit Hagar. Hagar, when pregnant by Abraham, however, began to act superciliously toward Sarah, provoking the latter to treat her harshly, to impose heavy work upon her, and even to strike her with her slipper.

Some Jewish commentators identify Hagar with Keturah (Jewish Babylonian Aramaic: קְטוּרָה, romanized: Qəṭurɔ꞉), the woman Abraham married after the death of Sarah, stating that Abraham sought her out after Sarah's death. It is suggested that Keturah was Hagar's personal name, and that "Hagar" was a descriptive label meaning "stranger". This interpretation is discussed in the Midrash and is supported by Rashi, Judah Loew ben Bezalel, Shlomo Ephraim Luntschitz, and Obadiah ben Abraham Bartenura. Rashi argues that "Keturah" was a name given to Hagar because her deeds were as beautiful as incense (hence: ketores), and/or that she remained chaste from the time she was separated from Abraham—קְטוּרָה derives from the Aramaic word "restrained". The contrary view (that Keturah was someone other than Hagar) is advocated by the Rashbam, Abraham ibn Ezra, David Kimhi, and Nachmanides. They were listed as two different people in the genealogies in the Book of Chronicles (1 Chronicles 1:29–33).

=== Rabbinic literature ===
According to the Midrash (Gen. R. xlv.), Hagar was the daughter of Pharaoh, who, seeing what great miracles God had done for Sarah's sake (Gen. xii. 17), said: "It is better for Hagar to be a slave in Sarah's house than mistress in her own." She was at first reluctant when Sarah desired her to marry Abraham, and although Sarah had full authority over her as her handmaid, she persuaded her, saying. "Consider thyself happy to be united with this saint." Hagar is held up as an example of the high degree of godliness prevalent in Abraham's time, for while Manoah was afraid that he would die because he had seen an angel of God (Judges 13:22), Hagar was not frightened by the sight of the divine messenger (Gen. R. l.c.). Her fidelity is praised, for even after Abraham sent her away she kept her marriage vow, and therefore she was identified with Keturah (Gen. xxv. 1), with allusion to (Aramaic, "to tie"; Gen. R. lxi.). Another explanation of the same name is "to adorn," because she was adorned with piety and good deeds (l.c.). It was Isaac who, after the death of Sarah, went to bring back Hagar to the house of his father; the Rabbis infer this from the report that Isaac came from Beer-lahai-roi, the place which Hagar had named (Gen. xvi. 14, xxiv. 62; Gen. R. lx.; see commentaries ad loc.).

Other homilies, however, take an unfavorable view of Hagar's character. Referring to the report that when she had conceived she began to despise her mistress, the Rabbis say that she gossiped about Sarah, saying: "She is certainly not as godly as she pretends to be, for in all the years of her married life she has had no children, while I conceived at once" (Gen. R. xlv.; Sefer ha-Yashar, Lek Leka). Sarah took revenge (Gen. xvi.) by preventing her intercourse with Abraham, by whipping her with her slipper, and by exacting humiliating services, such as carrying her bathing-materials to the bath (l.c.);she further caused Hagar by an evil eye to miscarry, and Ishmael, therefore, was her second child, as is inferred from the fact that the angel prophesied that she would bear a child (Gen. xvi. 11), while it had been narrated before that she was pregnant (Gen. xvi. 4). It is further inferred, from the words "she went astray" (Gen. xxi. 14, Hebr.), that as soon as she had reached the wilderness she relapsed into idolatry, and that she murmured against God's providence, saying: "Yesterday thou saidest: 'I will multiply thy seed exceedingly' [Gen. xvi. 10]; and now my son is dying of thirst." The fact that she selected an Egyptian woman as her son's wife is also counted against her as a proof that her conversion to Judaism was not sincere, for "throw the stick into the air, it will return to its root" (Gen. R. liii., end). This ‘Egyptian wife’ is explained in the Targum of pseudo-Jonathan to refer to Khadija and Fatima, the widow and the daughter of Mohammed respectively (see Zunz, "G. V." 2d ed., p. 288, note a).

=== Christianity ===
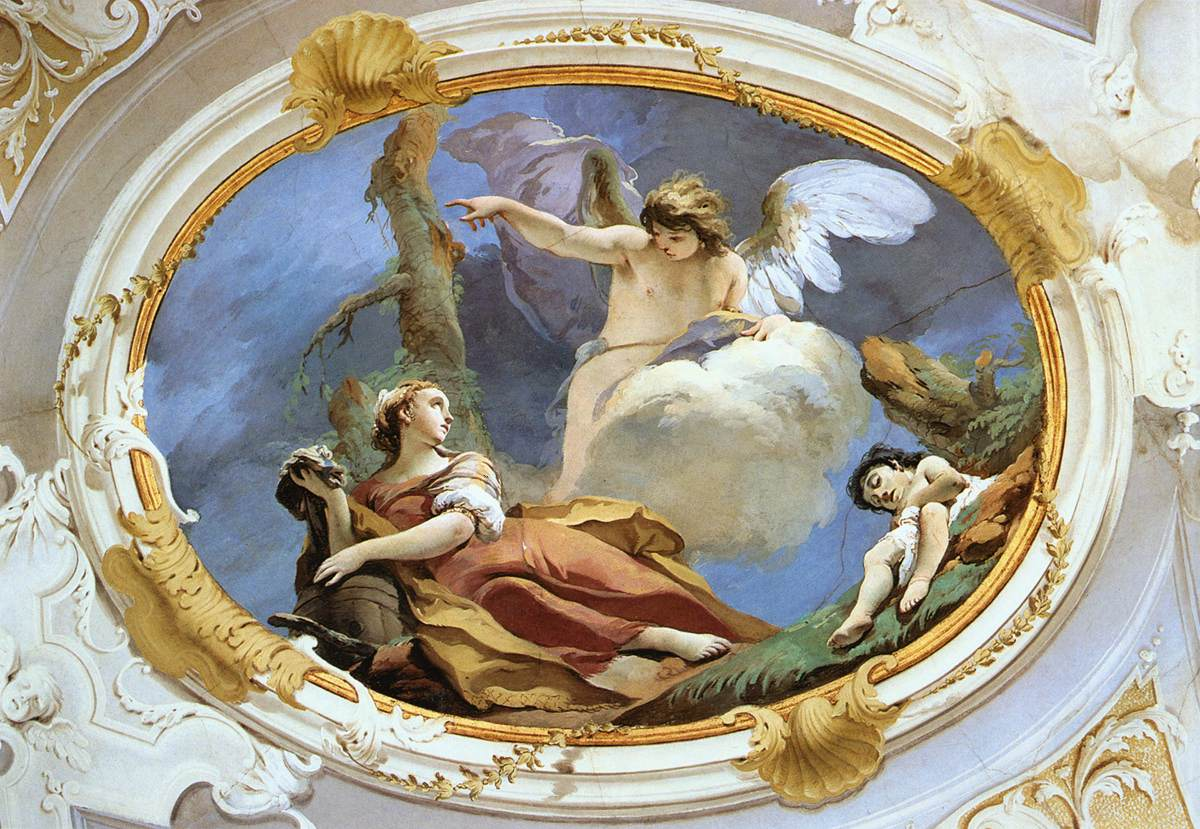
Hagar in the Wilderness by Giovanni Battista Tiepolo.

In the New Testament, Paul the Apostle made Hagar's experience an allegory of the difference between law and grace in his Epistle to the Galatians. Paul links the laws of the Torah, given on Mount Sinai, to the bondage of the Israelite people, implying that it was signified by Hagar's condition as a bondswoman, while the "free" heavenly Jerusalem is signified by Sarah and her child. The Biblical Mount Sinai has been referred to as "Agar", possibly named after Hagar.

In addition, in the story of the Samaritan woman at the well the author of the Gospel of John alludes to the ancient story of Hagar to "transports meaning from one text to another". Similar to the way that Hagar names God "The God Who Sees", the Samaritan woman gives Jesus a name "by saying, 'I know that Messiah is coming,' and Jesus confirms, 'I am he, the one who is speaking to you.'"

Augustine of Hippo referred to Hagar as symbolizing an "earthly city", or sinful condition of humanity: "In the earthly city (symbolised by Hagar) [...] we find two things, its own obvious presence and the symbolic presence of the heavenly city. New citizens are begotten to the earthly city by nature vitiated by sin but to the heavenly city by grace freeing nature from sin." This view was expounded on by medieval theologians such as Thomas Aquinas and John Wycliffe. The latter compared the children of Sarah to the redeemed, and those of Hagar to the unredeemed, who are "carnal by nature and mere exiles".

The story of Hagar demonstrates that survival is possible even under harshest conditions.

=== Islam ===
Hājar or Haajar (Arabic: هاجر) is the Arabic name used to identify the wife of Abraham (Arabic: Ibrāhīm) and the mother of Ishmael (Arabic: Ismā'īl). Although not mentioned by name in the Qur'an, she is referenced and alluded to via the story of her husband. She is a revered woman in the Islamic faith.

According to Muslim belief, she was the Egyptian wife of Ibrāhīm. She eventually settled in the Desert of Paran with her son Ismā'īl. Hājar is honoured as an especially important matriarch of monotheism, as it was through Ismā'īl that Muhammad would be born.

Some Modern Muslim scholars are of the opinion that she was never a handmaid of Sarah, rather she was a princess of Egypt who willingly followed Abraham and later married him. They further argue that Hagar and Ishmael were not cast out as claimed by Biblical narrative, but they were settled at Makkah (Paran) for the sake of Allah.

Neither Sarah nor Hājar is mentioned by name in the Qur'an, but the story is traditionally understood to be referred to in a line from Ibrāhīm's prayer in Surah Ibrahim (14:37): "I have settled some of my family in a barren valley near your Sacred House." While Hājar is not named, the reader lives Hājar's predicament indirectly through the eyes of Ibrāhīm. She is also frequently mentioned in the hadith.

According to the Qisas Al-Anbiya, a collection of tales about the prophets, Hājar was the daughter of the King of Maghreb, a descendant of Islamic prophet Salih. Her father was killed by Pharaoh Dhu l-'arsh (Arabic: ذُوالْعَرْش, romanized: dhu 'l-'arsh, meaning "he/master of the throne") and she was captured and taken as a slave. Later, because of her royal blood, she was made mistress of the female slaves and given access to all of Pharaoh's wealth. Upon conversion to Ibrāhīm's faith, the Pharaoh gave Hājar to Sarah who gave her to Ibrāhīm. In this account, the name "Hājar" (called Hajar in Arabic) comes from Hā ajru-ka (Arabic: هَا أَجْرُكَ), the Arabic for "here is your recompense".

According to another tradition, Hājar was the daughter of the Egyptian king, who gave her to Ibrāhīm as a wife, thinking Sarah was his sister. According to Ibn Abbas, Ismā'īl's birth to Hājar caused strife between her and Sarah, who was still barren. Ibrāhīm brought Hājar and their son to a land called Paran-aram or (Faran in Arabic, in latter days held to be the land surrounding Mecca). The objective of this journey was to "resettle" rather than "expel" Hājar. Ibrāhīm left Hājar and Ismā'īl under a tree and provided them with water. Hājar, learning that God had ordered Ibrāhīm to leave her in the desert of Paran, respected his decision. The Muslim belief is that God tested Ibrāhīm by ordering this task.

Hājar soon ran out of water, and Ismā'īl, an infant by that time, began to cry from hunger and thirst. Hājar panicked and ran between two nearby hills, Al-Safa and Al-Marwah, repeatedly in search for water. After her seventh run, an angel appeared over the location of the Zamzam and then hit the ground with his heel (or his wing) and caused a miraculous well to spring out of the ground. This is called the Zamzam Well and is located a few metres from the Kaaba in Mecca.

The incident of her running between the Al-Safa and Al-Marwah hills is remembered by Muslims when they perform their pilgrimage (Hajj) at Mecca. Part of the pilgrimage is to run seven times between the hills, in commemoration of Hājar's courage and faith in God as she searched for water in the desert (which is believed to have then miraculously appeared from the Zamzam Well), and to symbolize the celebration of motherhood in Islam. To complete the task, some Muslims also drink from the Zamzam Well and take some of the water back home from pilgrimage in memory of Hājar.

=== Baháʼí traditions ===
According to the Baháʼí Faith, the Báb was a descendant of Abraham and Hagar, and God made a promise to spread Abraham's seed. The Baháʼí Publishing House released a text on the wives and concubines of Abraham and traces their lineage to five different religions.

== Arts and literature ==
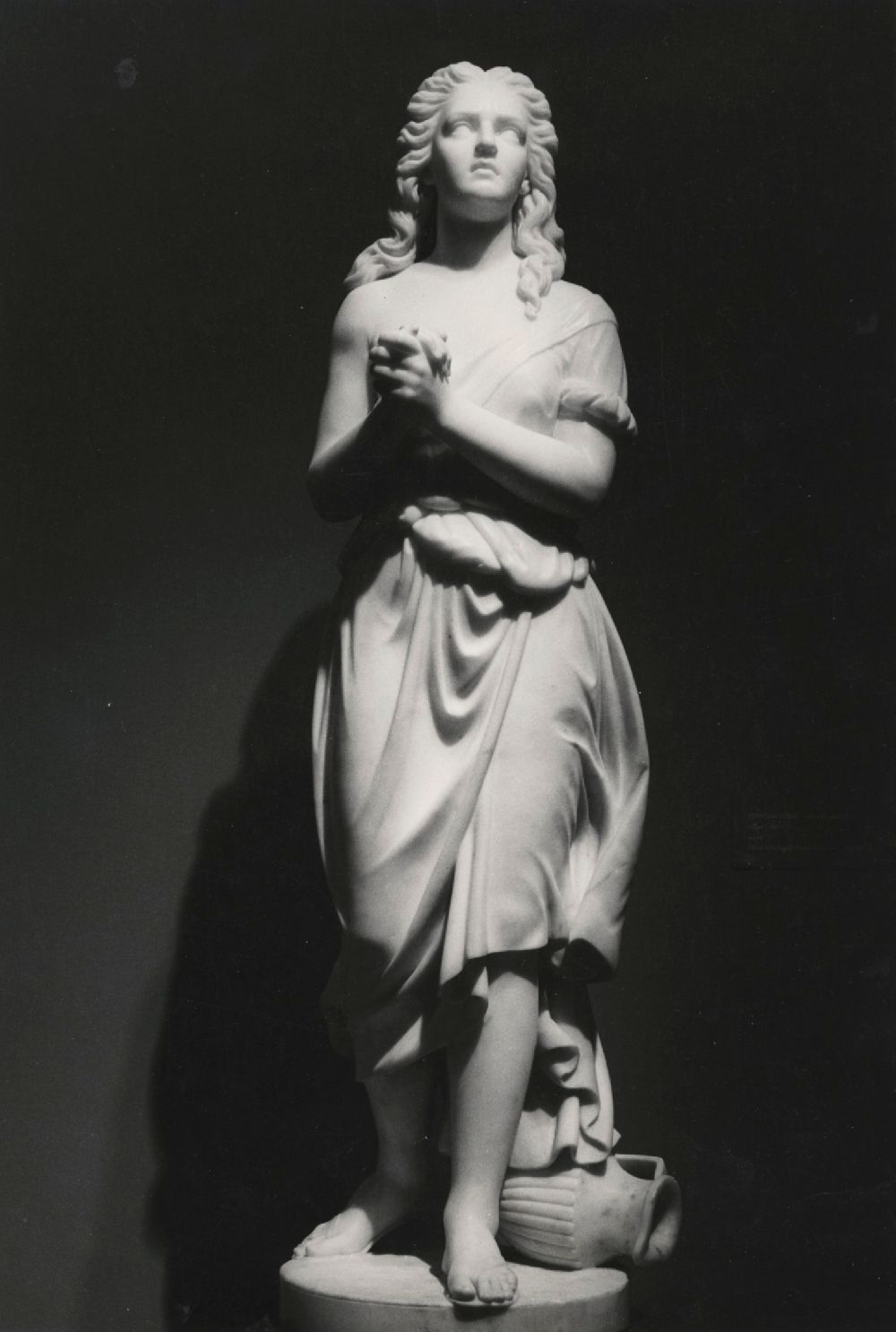
Edmonia Lewis, Hagar, 1875

Many artists have painted scenes from the story of Hagar and Ishmael in the desert, including Pieter Lastman, Gustave Doré, Frederick Goodall and James Eckford Lauder. William Shakespeare refers to Hagar in The Merchant of Venice Act II Scene 5 line 40 when Shylock says "What says that fool of Hagar's offspring, ha?" This line refers to the character Launcelot, whom Shylock is insulting by comparing him to the outcast Ishmael. It also reverses the conventional Christian interpretation by portraying the Christian character as the outcast.

Hagar's destitution and desperation are used as an excuse for criminality by characters in the work of Daniel Defoe, such as Moll Flanders, and the conventional view of Hagar as the mother of outcasts is repeated in Samuel Taylor Coleridge's play Zapolya, whose heroine is assured that she is "no Hagar's offspring; thou art the rightful heir to an appointed king."

In the 19th century a more sympathetic portrayal became prominent, especially in America. Edmonia Lewis, the early African-American and Native American sculptor, made Hagar the subject of one of her most well-known works. She said it was inspired by "strong sympathy for all women who have struggled and suffered". In novels and poems Hagar herself, or characters named Hagar, were depicted as unjustly suffering exiles. These include the long dramatic poem Hagar by Eliza Jane Poitevent Nicholson (pen name Pearl Rivers), president of the National Woman's Press Association; Hagar in the Wilderness by Nathaniel Parker Willis, the highest-paid magazine writer of his day; and Hagar's Farewell by Augusta Moore. In 1913 this was joined by the overtly feminist novel Hagar, by the American Southern socialist and suffragist Mary Johnston. Hall Caine gave the name A Son of Hagar to 1885 book set in contemporary England and dealing with the theme of illegitimacy.

A similarly sympathetic view prevails in more recent literature. The novel The Stone Angel by Margaret Laurence has a protagonist named Hagar married to a man named Bram, whose life story loosely imitates that of the biblical Hagar. A character named Hagar is prominently featured in Toni Morrison's novel Song of Solomon, which features numerous Biblical themes and allusions. In the 1979 novel Kindred, by Octavia Butler, the protagonist Dana has an ancestor named Hagar (born into slavery) whom we meet towards the end of the novel, as part of Dana's time travel back to Maryland in the 19th century. Hagar is mentioned briefly in Salman Rushdie's controversial novel The Satanic Verses, where Mecca is replaced with 'Jahilia', a desert village built on sand and served by Hagar's spring. Hagar is mentioned, along with Bilhah and Zilpah, in Margaret Atwood's The Handmaid's Tale, a dystopian novel which centres around the women whose duty it is to produce children for their masters, assuming the place of their wives in a rape ceremony based upon the biblical passage. In the recent book of nonfiction, The Woman Who Named God: Abraham's Dilemma and the Birth of Three Faiths, by Charlotte Gordon provides an account of Hagar's life from the perspectives of the three monotheistic religions, Islam, Judaism, and Christianity. In 2019, Nyasha Junior published a book on Hagar entitled Reimaging Hagar: Blackness and Bible which provides a reception history of Hagar that focuses on interpretations of Hagar as a black woman and particularly those interpretations of Hagar that are made by African Americans.

== Contemporary influence ==
=== Israel ===
Since the 1970s, the custom has arisen of giving the name "Hagar" to newborn female babies. The giving of this name is often taken as a controversial political act, marking the parents as being supporters of reconciliation with the Palestinians and the Arab world, and is frowned upon by many, including nationalists and the religious. The connotations of the name were represented by the founding of the Israeli journal Hagar: Studies in Culture, Polity and Identities in 2000.

=== African Americans ===
Several black American feminists have written about Hagar, comparing her story to those of slaves in American history. Wilma Bailey, in an article entitled "Hagar: A Model for an Anabaptist Feminist", refers to her as a "maidservant" and "slave". She sees Hagar as a model of "power, skills, strength and drive". In the article "A Mistress, A Maid, and No Mercy", Renita J. Weems argues that the relationship between Sarah and Hagar exhibits "ethnic prejudice exacerbated by economic and social exploitation".

Presbyterian theologian and professor Delores S. Williams compares Hagar's experience as an African slave and surrogate for Sarah's child to the experience of American-American motherhood and the history of African-American women's role in caring for their masters' children during enslavement.

=== Assisted reproduction ===
Hagar bearing a child for an infertile woman is an example of what is now called surrogacy or contractual gestation, except in Hagar's case she had no choice in the matter. Critics of this and other assisted reproductive technologies have used Hagar in their analysis. As early as 1988, Anna Goldman-Amirav in Reproductive and Genetic Engineering wrote of Hagar within "the Biblical 'battle of the wombs' [which] lay the foundation for the view of women, fertility, and sexuality in the patriarchal society".

== See also ==
- Abraham and Hagar
- Hagar in Islam
- Hagarenes
- Lech-Lecha
- Vayera
