= Abraham =

Namesake of the Abrahamic religions

- אַבְרָהָם Avraham
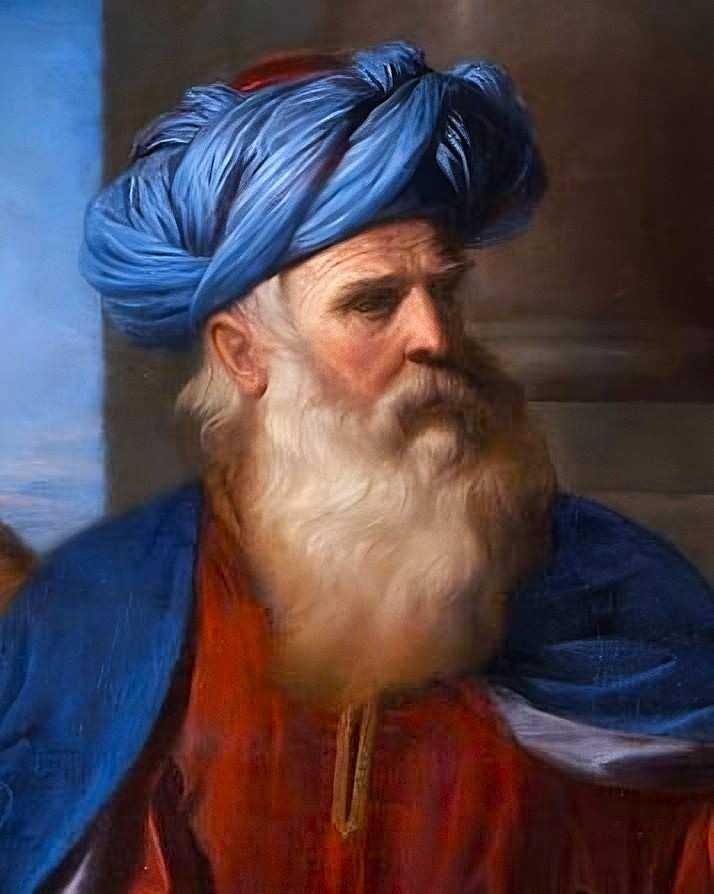
- Detail from Abraham Casting out Hagar and Ishmael (1657) by Giovanni Francesco Barbieri

Personal life
- Born: Abram (אַבְרָם, Avram) Ur of the Chaldees, Mesopotamia
- Died: Cave of Machpelah, Hebron, Canaan
- Spouse: Sarah; Hagar (according to Islam); Keturah
- Children: Oldest to youngest: Ishmael (son, with Hagar); Isaac (son, with Sarah); Zimran (son, with Keturah); Jokshan (son, with Keturah); Medan (son, with Keturah); Midian (son, with Keturah); Ishbak (son, with Keturah); Shuah (son, with Keturah)
- Parent: Terah (father)
- Known for: Namesake of the Abrahamic religions: traditional founder of the Jewish nation, spiritual ancestor of Christians, major Islamic prophet
- Relatives: Haran (brother); Nahor (brother); Lot (nephew); see: Abraham's family tree

Religious life
- Religion: Monotheism

Abraham (Note: /ˈeɪbrəhæm, -həm/; Hebrew: אַבְרָהָם, Modern: Avraham, Tiberian: ʾAḇrāhām; Arabic: إِبْرَاهِيْمُ, romanized: ʾIbrāhīm; Biblical Greek: Ἀβραάμ, romanized: Abraám; Latin: Abrahamus) (originally Abram) (Note: Hebrew: אַבְרָם, Modern: Avram, Tiberian: ʾAḇrām) is widely revered as a foundational legendary figure among adherents of the eponymous Abrahamic religions. In Judaism, he is the ethnic ancestor and first Hebrew patriarch who began the covenantal relationship between the Jewish people and God; in Christianity, he is regarded as the forebear of Jesus and the spiritual ancestor of all Christians; (Note: Jeffrey 1992, p. 10 writes "In the NT Abraham is recognized as the father of Israel and of the Levitical priesthood (Heb. 7), as the "legal" forebear of Jesus (i.e. ancestor of Joseph according to Matt. 1), and spiritual progenitor of all Christians (Rom. 4; Gal. 3:16, 29; cf. also the Visio Pauli)") and in Islam, he is a link in the chain of Islamic prophets that begins with Adam and culminates in Muhammad. Abraham is revered in all other Abrahamic religions, such as the Baháʼí Faith and the Druze faith. He is regarded as the common forefather of both the Arab people through his son Ishmael and the Jewish people through his son Isaac.

The story of the life of Abraham, as told in the narrative of the Book of Genesis in the Hebrew Bible, revolves around the themes of blessing and promise, especially the promise of progeny and land. He is said to have been called by God to leave the house of his father Terah and settle in the land of Canaan, which God now promises to Abraham and his progeny. This promise is subsequently inherited by Isaac, Abraham's son by his wife Sarah, while Isaac's half-brother Ishmael is also promised that he will be the founder of a great nation. Abraham purchases a tomb (the Cave of the Patriarchs) at Hebron to be Sarah's grave, thus establishing his right to the land; and, in the second generation, his heir Isaac is married to a woman from his own kin to earn his parents' approval. Abraham later marries Keturah and has six more sons; but, on his death, when he is buried beside Sarah, it is Isaac who receives "all Abraham's goods" while the other sons receive only "gifts".

Nearly all scholars view the patriarchal age as a late literary construct that does not correspond to any historical era that occurred. The stories themselves are fictitious and reflect a substantially later geopolitical situation; they may, however, retain some historical qualities. Many scholars believe the Abraham traditions developed orally over centuries, before being incorporated into the Book of Genesis during the Persian period of Judah, where they helped shape post-exilic Jewish identity and were used to support competing claims to the land.

== The Abraham cycle ==
=== Structure and narrative programs ===
The Abraham cycle (Genesis 11:27–Genesis 25:11) unfolds as a narrative of mounting tension, centered on the conflict between God's promise that Abram (Abraham's birth name) would father a lineage and become the ancestor of numerous nations, and a succession of crises that jeopardize this divine commitment. The storytelling method used here is the "obstacle story," a literary device renowned for its enduring and universal popularity across cultures and eras.

The Abraham cycle is not structured by a unified plot centered on a conflict and its resolution or a problem and its solution. The episodes are often only loosely linked, and the sequence is not always logical. The story portrays Abraham gradually assuming the role of the ideal religious person amid themes of blessing and promise, especially the promise of progeny and land. These themes form "narrative programs" set out in Genesis 11:27–31 concerning the sterility of Sarah and Genesis 12:1–3 in which Abraham is ordered to leave the land of his birth for the land God will show him.

=== Origins and calling ===
Abraham's journey to Canaan according to the Book of Genesis.

Terah, the ninth in descent from Noah, was the father of Abram, Nahor and Haran (Hebrew: הָרָן Hārān). Haran was the father of Lot, who was Abram's nephew; the family lived in Ur of the Chaldees. Haran died there while Terah was still alive. Abram married Sarah (Sarai) but, unlike Nahor and his wife Milcah, they were childless.

Genesis 11 records that Terah, Abram, Sarai, and Lot departed for Canaan, but settled in a place named Haran (Hebrew: חָרָן Ḥārān), where Terah died at the age of 205.

Then the narrative in Genesis 12 shows that God told Abram to leave his country and his kindred, and go to a land that God would show him, and promised to make of him a great nation, bless him, make his name great, bless them that bless him, and curse them who may curse him. Abram was 75 years old when he and Sarai left Haran with his nephew Lot, and their possessions and people that they had acquired, and they traveled to Shechem in Canaan. Abram built an altar to God in Shechem, and later he built another altar between Bethel and Ai. From there the party travelled to the Negev, or to the south.

According to some exegetes, like Nahmanides, Abram was actually born in Haran and he later relocated to Ur, while some of his family remained in Haran.

=== Sarai and Pharaoh ===
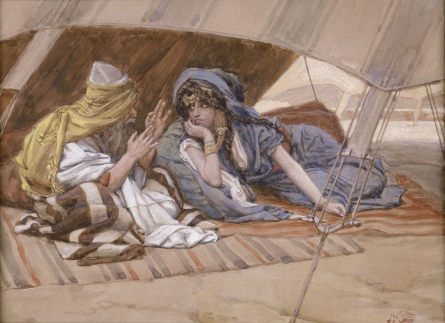
Abraham's Counsel to Sarai, watercolor by James Tissot, c. 1900 (Jewish Museum, New York)

There was a severe famine in the land of Canaan, so that Abram, Lot, and their households traveled to Egypt. On the way Abram told Sarai to tell the Egyptians she was his sister, so that the Egyptians would not kill him. When they entered Egypt, the Pharaoh's officials praised Sarai's beauty to Pharaoh, and they took her into the palace and gave Abram goods in exchange. God afflicted Pharaoh and his household with plagues, which led Pharaoh to try to find out what was wrong. Upon discovering that Sarai was a married woman, Pharaoh demanded that Abram and Sarai leave, escorting them to the frontier.

=== Abram and Lot separate ===
When they lived for a while in the Negev after being banished from Egypt and came back to the Bethel and Ai area, Abram's and Lot's sizable herds occupied the same pastures. This became a problem for the herdsmen, who were assigned to each family's cattle. The conflicts between herdsmen had become so troublesome that Abram suggested that Lot choose a separate area, either on the left hand or on the right hand, that there be no conflict between them. Lot decided to go eastward to the plain of Jordan, where the land was well watered everywhere as far as Zoara, and he dwelled in the cities of the plain toward Sodom. Abram went south to Hebron and settled in the plain of Mamre, where he built another altar to worship God.

=== Chedorlaomer ===
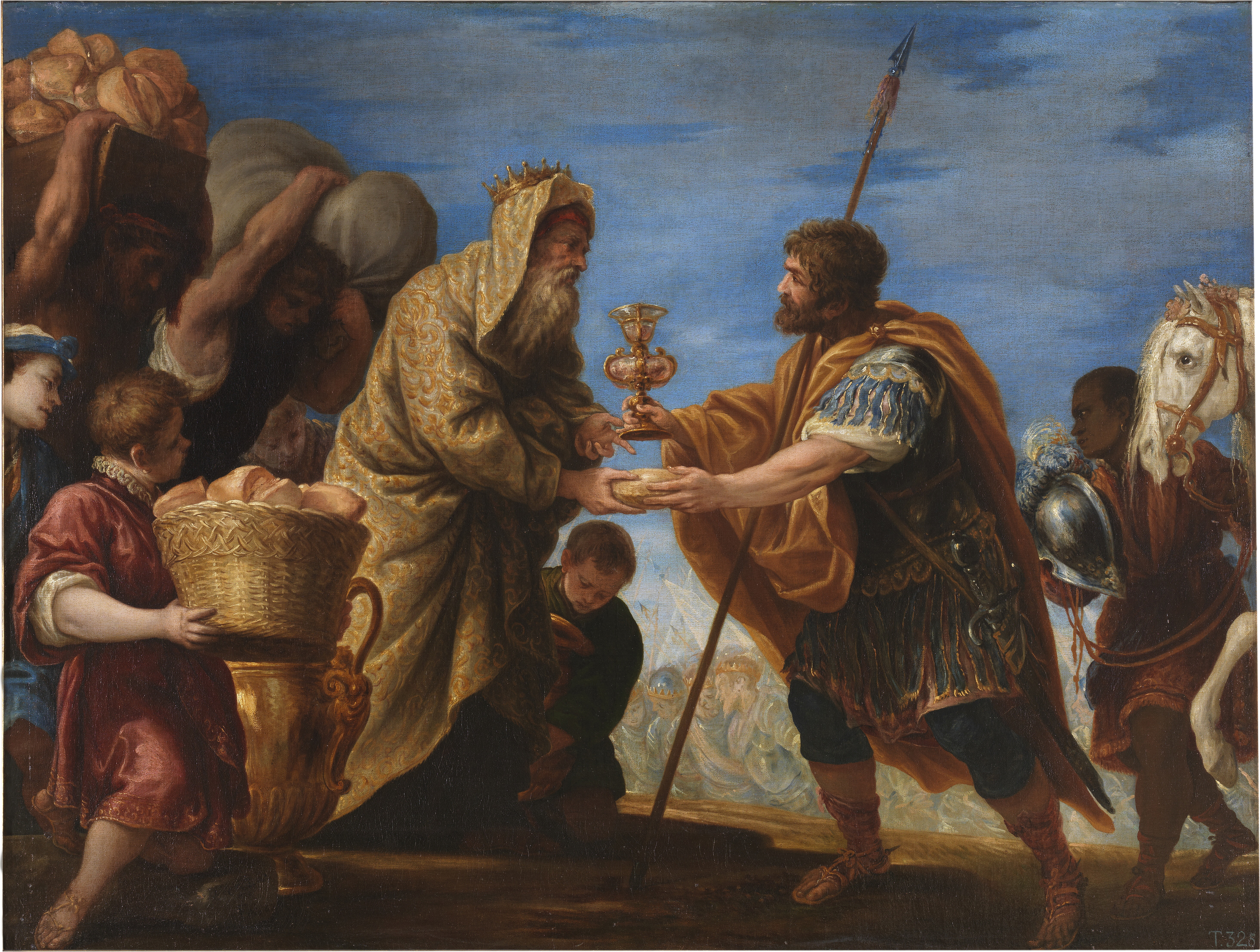
Abraham and Melchizedek by Juan Antonio de Frías y Escalante, 1668

During the rebellion of the Jordan River cities, Sodom and Gomorrah, against Elam, Abram's nephew, Lot, was taken prisoner along with his entire household by the invading Elamite forces. The Elamite army came to collect the spoils of war, after having just defeated the king of Sodom's armies. Lot and his family, at the time, were settled on the outskirts of the Kingdom of Sodom which made them a visible target.

One person who escaped capture came and told Abram what happened. Once Abram received this news, he immediately assembled 318 trained servants. Abram's force headed north in pursuit of the Elamite army, who were already worn down from the Battle of Siddim. When they caught up with them at Laish, Abram devised a battle plan by splitting his group into more than one unit, and launched a night raid. Not only were they able to free the captives, Abram's unit chased and slaughtered the Elamite King Chedorlaomer at Hobah, just north of Damascus. They freed Lot, as well as his household and possessions, and recovered all of the goods from Sodom that had been taken.

Upon Abram's return, Sodom's king came out to meet with him in the Valley of Shaveh, the "king's dale". Also, Melchizedek king of Salem (Jerusalem), a priest of El Elyon, brought out bread and wine and blessed Abram and God. Abram then gave Melchizedek a tenth of everything. The king of Sodom then offered to let Abram keep all the possessions if he would merely return his people. Abram declined to accept anything other than the share to which his allies were entitled.

=== Covenant of the pieces ===
Some time after these events, the voice of the LORD came to Abram in a vision, promising him a "reward", namely a son, and repeating the promise of the land and descendants as numerous as the stars. Abram was childless until then, and had anticipated that Eliezer of Damascus, head of his household, would inherit his estate on his death. He was to be rewarded in virtue of his trust in God.

Abram and God then made a covenant ceremony, and God told Abram of the future bondage of his people "in a land that is not theirs", referring to Egypt. God then described to Abram the land that his offspring would claim: the land of the Kenites, Kenizzites, Kadmonites, Hittites, Perizzites, the Rephaim, Amorites, Canaanites, Girgashites, and Jebusites.

=== Hagar ===
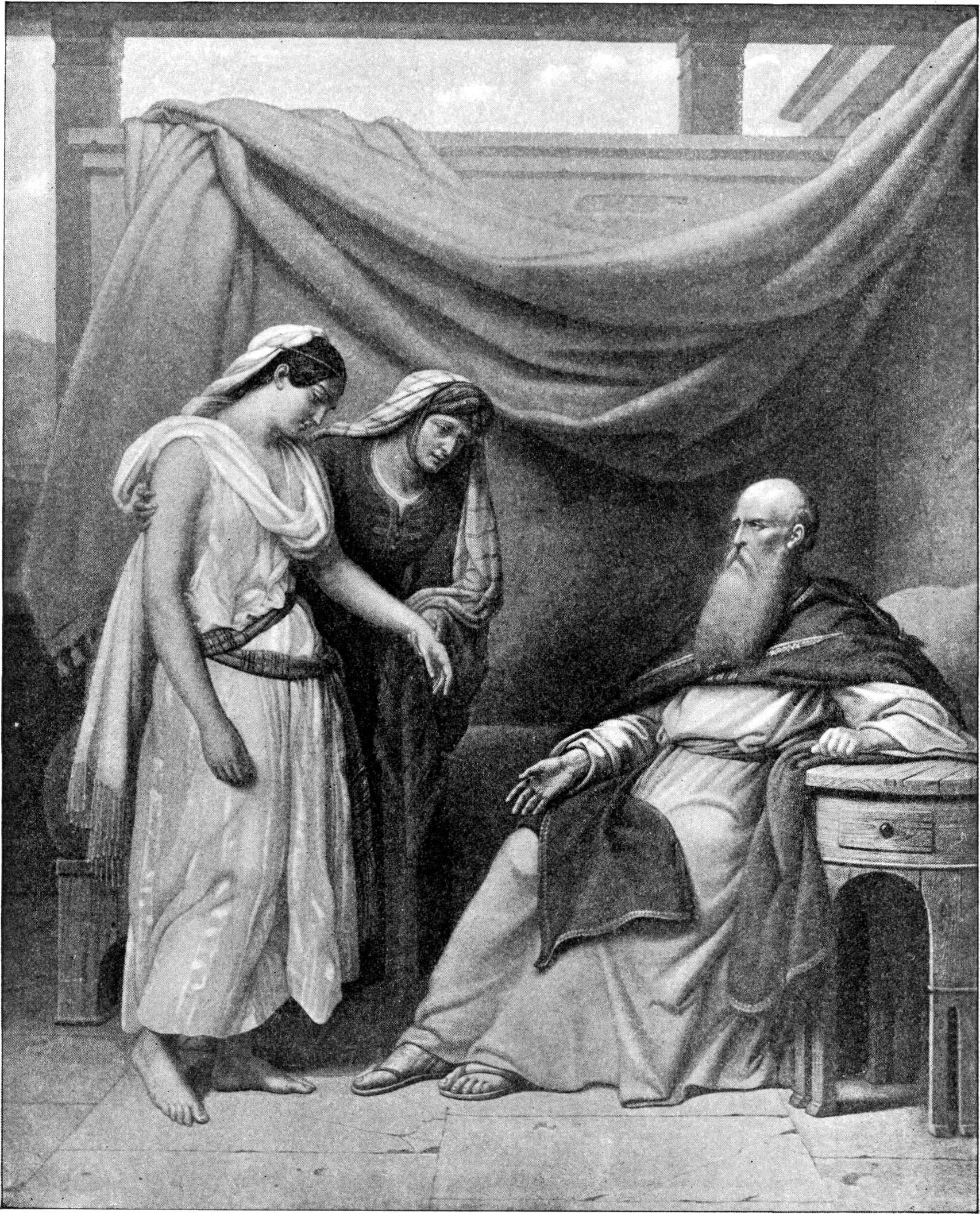
Abraham, Sarah and Hagar, Bible illustration from 1897

Abram and Sarai tried to make sense of how he would become a progenitor of nations, because after 10 years of living in Canaan, no child had been born. Sarai then offered her Egyptian slave, Hagar, to Abram with the intention that she would bear him a son.

After Hagar found she was pregnant, she began to despise her mistress, Sarai. Sarai responded by mistreating Hagar, and Hagar fled into the wilderness. An angel spoke with Hagar at the fountain on the way to Shur. He instructed her to return to Abram's camp and that her son would be "a wild ass of a man; his hand shall be against every man, and every man's hand against him; and he shall dwell in the face of all his brethren." She was told to call her son Ishmael. Hagar then called God who spoke to her "El-roi", ("Thou God seest me": KJV). From that day onward, the well was called Beer-lahai-roi, ("The well of him that liveth and seeth me": KJV margin), located between Kadesh and Bered. She then did as she was instructed by returning to her mistress in order to have her child. Abram was 86 years of age when Ishmael was born.

=== The covenant of circumcision ===
Thirteen years later, when Abram was 99 years of age, God appeared to Abram again and called upon him to be "perfect" or "blameless", so that God could make a covenant with him. Abram fell or bowed to the ground in a gesture of reverence, and God gave Abram a new name: he was now to be called "Abraham". Abraham means "father of a multitude": he would be "a father of many nations". The new name denotes a new stage in Abraham's life.

Abraham then received God's instructions concerning circumcision.

God also declared Sarai's new name to be "Sarah", blessed her, and told Abraham, "I will give thee a son also of her". Abraham again fell to the ground, and he laughed, saying "in his heart, 'Shall a child be born unto him that is a hundred years old? and shall Sarah, that is ninety years old, bear [a child]?'"

Immediately after Abraham's encounter with God, he had his entire household of men, including himself (age 99) and Ishmael (age 13), circumcised.

=== Three visitors ===
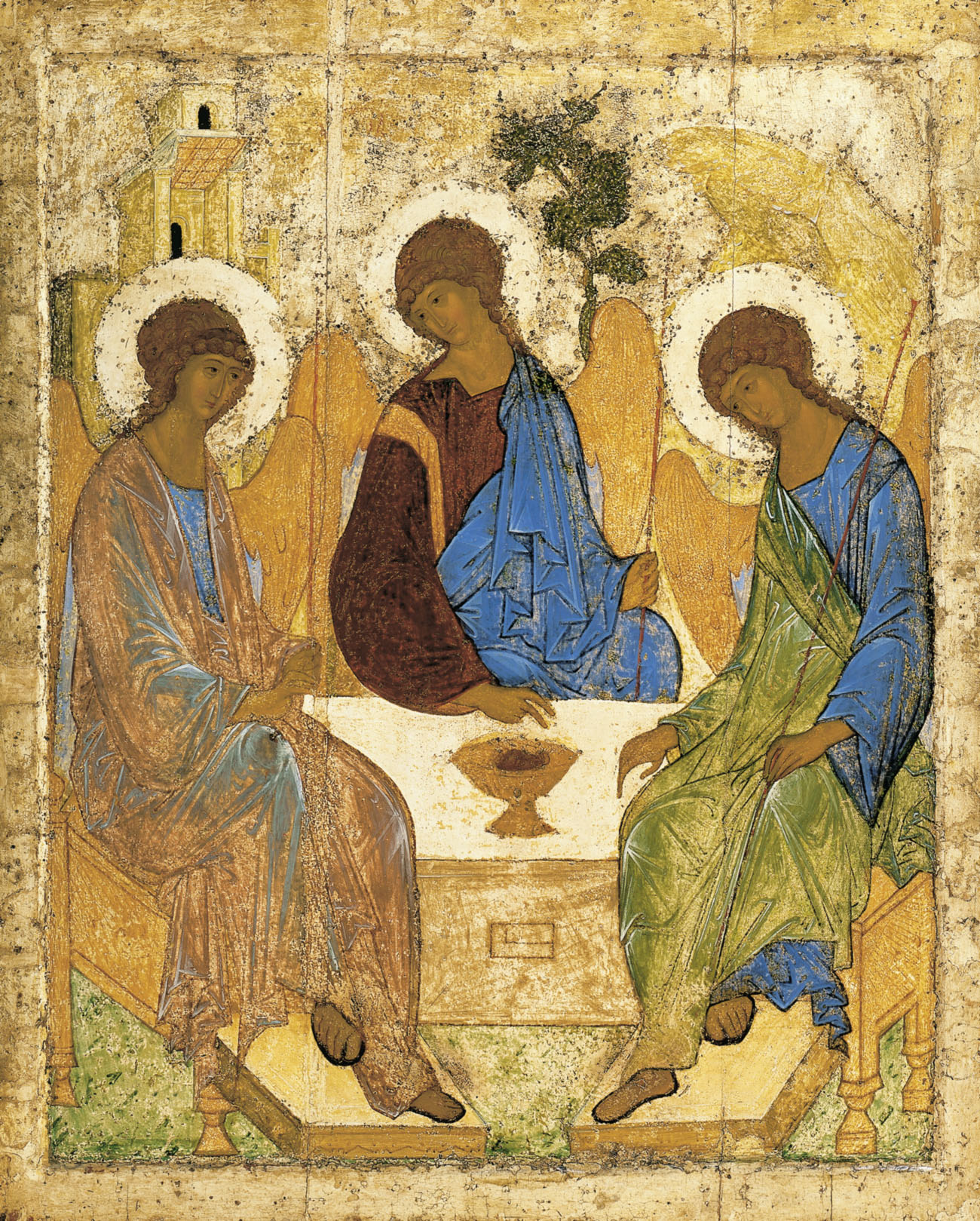
Tempera of the three visitors, The Trinity by Andrei Rublev c. 1411–1427

Not long afterward, during the heat of the day, Abraham had been sitting at the entrance of his tent by the terebinths of Mamre. He looked up and saw three men in the presence of God. Then he ran and bowed to the ground to welcome them. Abraham then offered to wash their feet and fetch them a morsel of bread, to which they assented. Abraham rushed to Sarah's tent to order ash cakes made from choice flour, then he ordered a servant-boy to prepare a choice calf. When all was prepared, he set curds, milk and the calf before them, waiting on them, under a tree, as they ate.

One of the visitors told Abraham that upon his return next year, Sarah would have a son. While at the tent entrance, Sarah overheard what was said and she laughed to herself about the prospect of having a child at their ages. The visitor inquired of Abraham why Sarah laughed at bearing a child at her age, as nothing is too hard for God. Frightened, Sarah denied laughing.

=== Abraham's plea ===
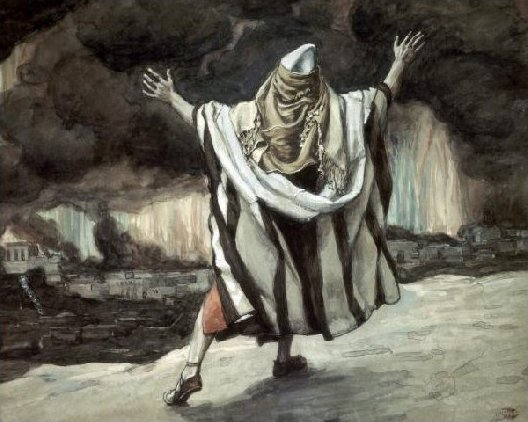
Abraham Sees Sodom in Flames, watercolor by James Tissot, c. 1896–1902

After eating, Abraham and the three visitors got up. Accompanied by Abraham, the visitors walked over to the peak that overlooked the "cities of the plain" to discuss the fate of Sodom and Gomorrah for their detestable sins that were so great, they moved God to action. Because of God's promise to Abraham regarding his destiny, God revealed plans to assess what these cities have done and confer judgment on them. At this point, the two other visitors left for Sodom. Then Abraham turned to God and pleaded decrementally with Him (from fifty persons to less) that "if there were at least ten righteous men found in the city, would not God spare the city?" For the sake of ten righteous people, God declared that he would not destroy the city.

When the two visitors arrived in Sodom to conduct their report, they planned on staying in the city square. However, Abraham's nephew, Lot, met with them and strongly insisted that these two "men" stay at his house for the night. A rally of men stood outside of Lot's home and demanded that Lot bring out his guests so that they may "know" (v. 5) them. However, Lot objected and offered his virgin daughters who had not "known" (v. 8) man to the rally of men instead. They rejected that notion and sought to break down Lot's door to get to his male guests, thus confirming the wickedness of the city and portending their imminent destruction.

Early the next morning, Abraham went to the place where he stood before God. He "looked out toward Sodom and Gomorrah" and saw what became of the cities of the plain, where not even "ten righteous" (v. 18:32) had been found, as "the smoke of the land went up as the smoke of a furnace."

=== Abimelech ===
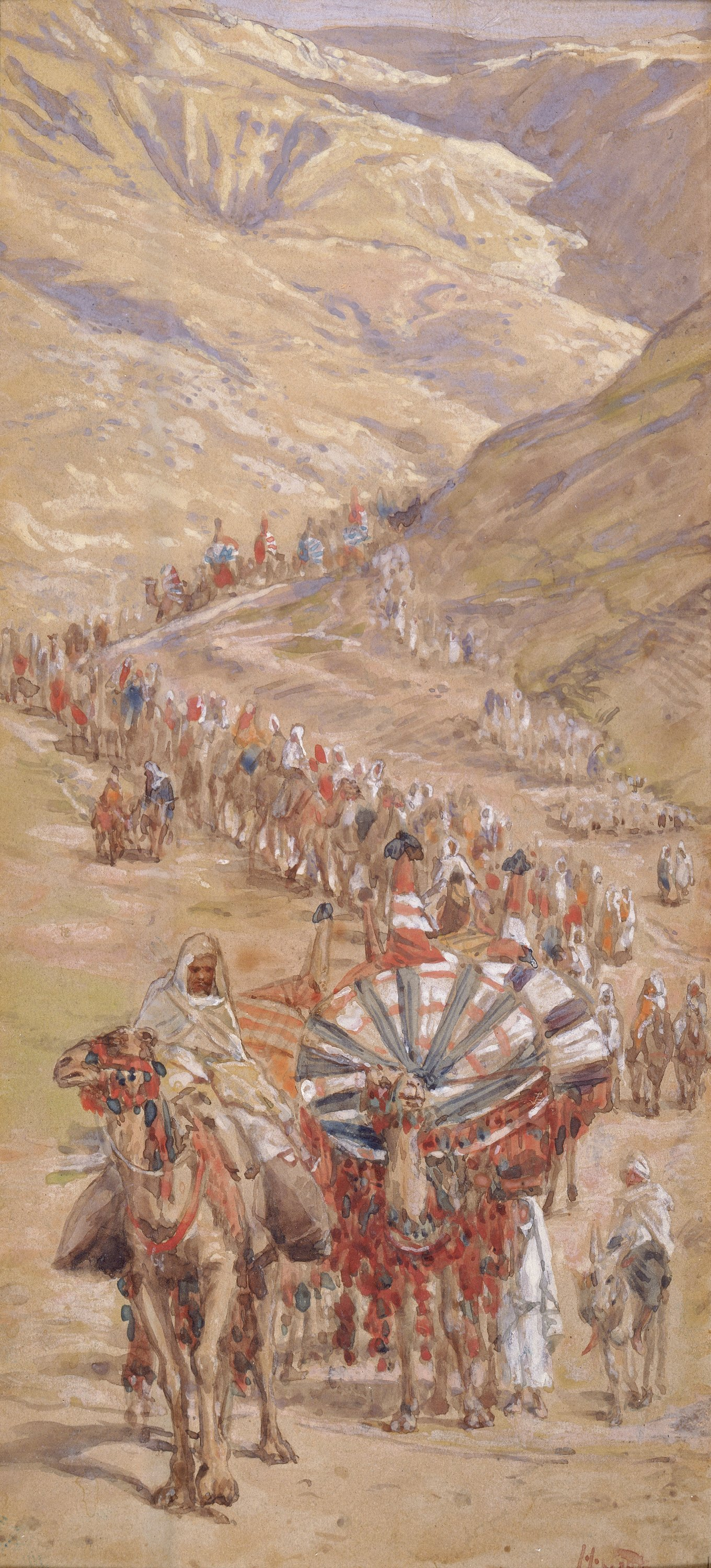
The Caravan of Abraham, watercolor by James Tissot, before 1903 (Jewish Museum, New York)

Abraham moved to live between Kadesh and Shur, settling in Gerar, later associated with the Philistines". While he was living in there, Abraham openly claimed that Sarah was his sister, and she confirmed this assertion, leading King Abimelech to call for Sarah to be brought to him. God then came to Abimelech in a dream and declared that taking her would result in his death, because she was a man's wife. Abimelech had not laid hands on her, so he inquired if he would also slay a righteous nation, especially since Abraham and Sarah had claimed that they were siblings. In response, God told Abimelech that he did indeed have a blameless heart and that is why he continued to exist. However, should he not return the wife of Abraham back to him, God would surely destroy Abimelech and his entire household. Abimelech was informed that Abraham was a prophet who would pray for him.

Early next morning, Abimelech informed his servants of his dream and approached Abraham inquiring as to why he had brought such great guilt upon his kingdom. Abraham stated that he thought there was no fear of God in that place, and that they might kill him for his wife. Then Abraham defended what he had said as not being a lie at all: "And yet indeed she is my sister; she is the daughter of my father, but not the daughter of my mother; and she became my wife." Abimelech returned Sarah to Abraham, and gave him gifts of sheep, oxen, and servants; and invited him to settle wherever he pleased in Abimelech's lands. Further, Abimelech gave Abraham a thousand pieces of silver to serve as Sarah's vindication before all. Abraham then prayed for Abimelech and his household, since God had stricken the women with infertility because of the taking of Sarah.

Two incidents follow in which Abraham and Abimelech resolve issues by agreement. Firstly, Abimelech, supported by Phicol, the chief of his troops, secures from the patriarch an agreement that he will act honestly in his dealings with Abimelech and his descendants, reciprocating the manner in which Abimelech says he has treated Abraham. Subsequently, a specific issue arises in relation to a well which Abraham has dug but which Abimelech's servants have taken over. Abimelech and Phicol approached Abraham because of a dispute over the well. Abraham reproached Abimelech due to his servants' aggressive attacks and the seizing of the well. Abimelech claimed ignorance of the incident. Then Abraham offered a pact by providing sheep and oxen to Abimelech. Further, to attest that Abraham was the one who had dug the well, he also gave Abimelech seven ewes for proof. Because of this sworn oath, they called the place of this well Beersheba. After Abimelech and Phicol headed back to Philistia, Abraham planted a tamarisk grove in Beersheba and called upon "the name of the LORD, the everlasting God".

=== Isaac ===
As had been prophesied at Mamre the previous year, Sarah became pregnant and bore a son to Abraham, on the first anniversary of the covenant of circumcision. Abraham was "an hundred years old" when his son, whom he named Isaac, was born, and he circumcised him when he was eight days old. For Sarah, the thought of giving birth and nursing a child, at such an old age, also brought her much laughter, as she declared, "God hath made me to laugh, so that all who hear will laugh with me." Isaac continued to grow, and on the day he was weaned, Abraham held a great feast to honor the occasion. During the celebration, however, Sarah found Ishmael mocking; an observation that would begin to clarify the birthright of Isaac.

=== Ishmael ===
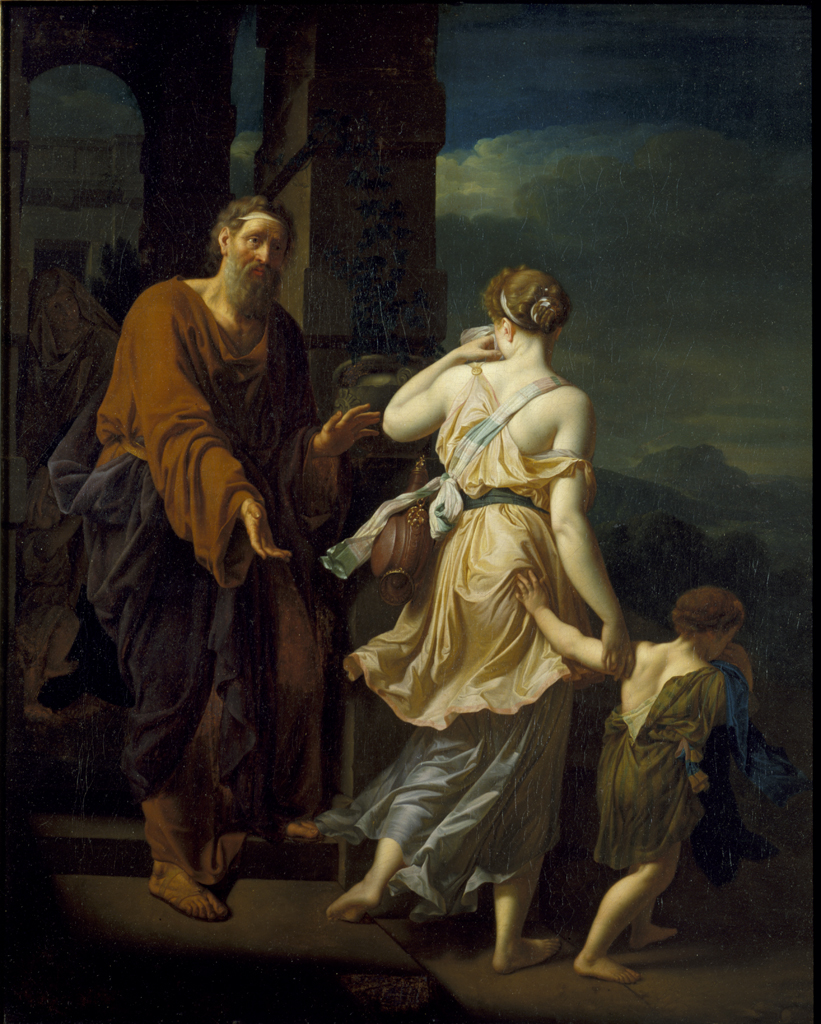
The Expulsion of Hagar and Ishmael, by Adriaen van der Werff, c. 1699 (Rhode Island School of Design Museum, Rhode Island)

Ishmael was fourteen years old when Abraham's son Isaac was born to Sarah. When she found Ishmael teasing Isaac, Sarah told Abraham to send both Ishmael and Hagar away. She declared that Ishmael would not share in Isaac's inheritance. Abraham was greatly distressed by his wife's words and sought the advice of his God. God told Abraham not to be distressed but to do as his wife commanded. God reassured Abraham that "in Isaac shall seed be called to thee." He also said Ishmael would make a nation, "because he is thy seed".

Early the next morning, Abraham brought Hagar and Ishmael out together. He gave her bread and water and sent them away. The two wandered in the wilderness of Beersheba until her bottle of water was completely consumed. In a moment of despair, she burst into tears. After God heard the boy's voice, an angel of the Lord confirmed to Hagar that he would become a great nation, and will be "living on his sword". A well of water then appeared so that it saved their lives. As the boy grew, he became a skilled archer living in the wilderness of Paran. Eventually his mother found a wife for Ishmael from her home country, the land of Egypt.

=== Binding of Isaac ===
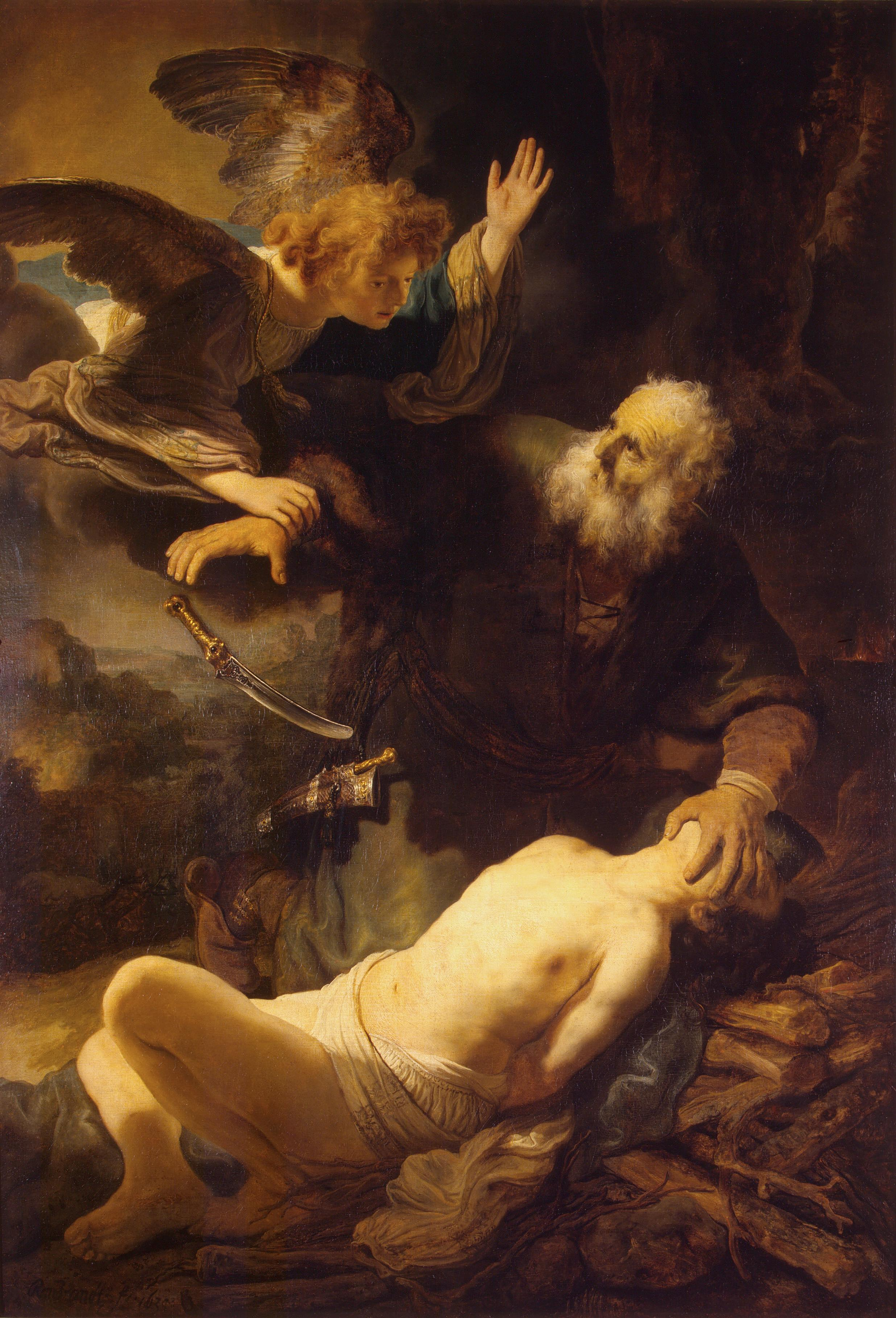
The Angel Hinders the Offering of Isaac, by Rembrandt, 1635 (Hermitage Museum, Saint Petersburg)

At some point in Isaac's youth, Abraham was commanded by God to offer his son up as a sacrifice in the land of Moriah. The patriarch traveled three days until he came to the mount that God told him of. He then commanded the servants to remain while he and Isaac proceeded alone into the mount. Isaac carried the wood upon which he would be sacrificed. Along the way, Isaac asked his father where the animal for the burnt offering was, to which Abraham replied "God will provide himself a lamb for a burnt offering". Just as Abraham was about to sacrifice his son, he was interrupted by the angel of the Lord, and he saw behind him a "ram caught in a thicket by his horns", which he sacrificed instead of his son. The place was later named as Jehovah-jireh. For his obedience he received another promise of numerous descendants and abundant prosperity. After this event, Abraham went to Beersheba.

=== Later years ===
Sarah died, and Abraham buried her in the Cave of the Patriarchs (the "cave of Machpelah"), near Hebron which he had purchased along with the adjoining field from Ephron the Hittite. After the death of Sarah, Abraham took another wife, a concubine named Keturah, and together they had six sons: Zimran, Jokshan, Medan, Midian, Ishbak, and Shuah.

Abraham lived to see Isaac marry Rebekah, and to see the birth of his twin grandsons Jacob and Esau. He died at age 175, and was buried in the cave of Machpelah by his sons Isaac and Ishmael.

== Historical context ==
=== Historicity ===
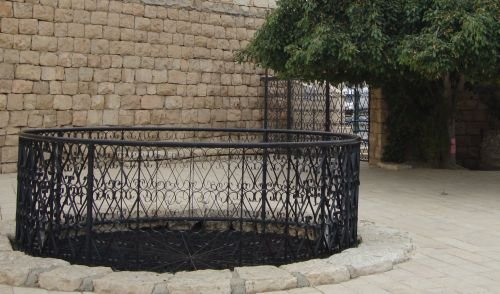
Abraham's Well at Beersheba, Israel

In the early and middle 20th century, leading archaeologists such as William F. Albright and G. Ernest Wright and biblical scholars such as Albrecht Alt and John Bright believed that the patriarchs and matriarchs were either real individuals or believable composites of people who lived in the "patriarchal age", the 2nd millennium BCE. However, in the 1970s, new arguments concerning Israel's past and the biblical texts challenged these views; these arguments can be found in Thomas L. Thompson's The Historicity of the Patriarchal Narratives (1974), and John Van Seters' Abraham in History and Tradition (1975). Thompson, a literary scholar, based his argument on archaeology and ancient texts. His thesis centered on the lack of compelling evidence that the patriarchs lived in the 2nd millennium BCE, and noted how certain biblical texts reflected first millennium conditions and concerns. Van Seters examined the patriarchal stories and argued that their names, social milieu, and messages strongly suggested that they were Iron Age creations. Van Seters' and Thompson's works were a paradigm shift in biblical scholarship and archaeology, which gradually led scholars to no longer consider the patriarchal narratives as historical. Some conservative scholars attempted to defend the Patriarchal narratives in the following years, but this has not found acceptance among scholars. By the beginning of the 21st century, archaeologists had stopped trying to recover any context that would make Abraham, Isaac or Jacob credible historical figures.

=== Origins of the narrative ===
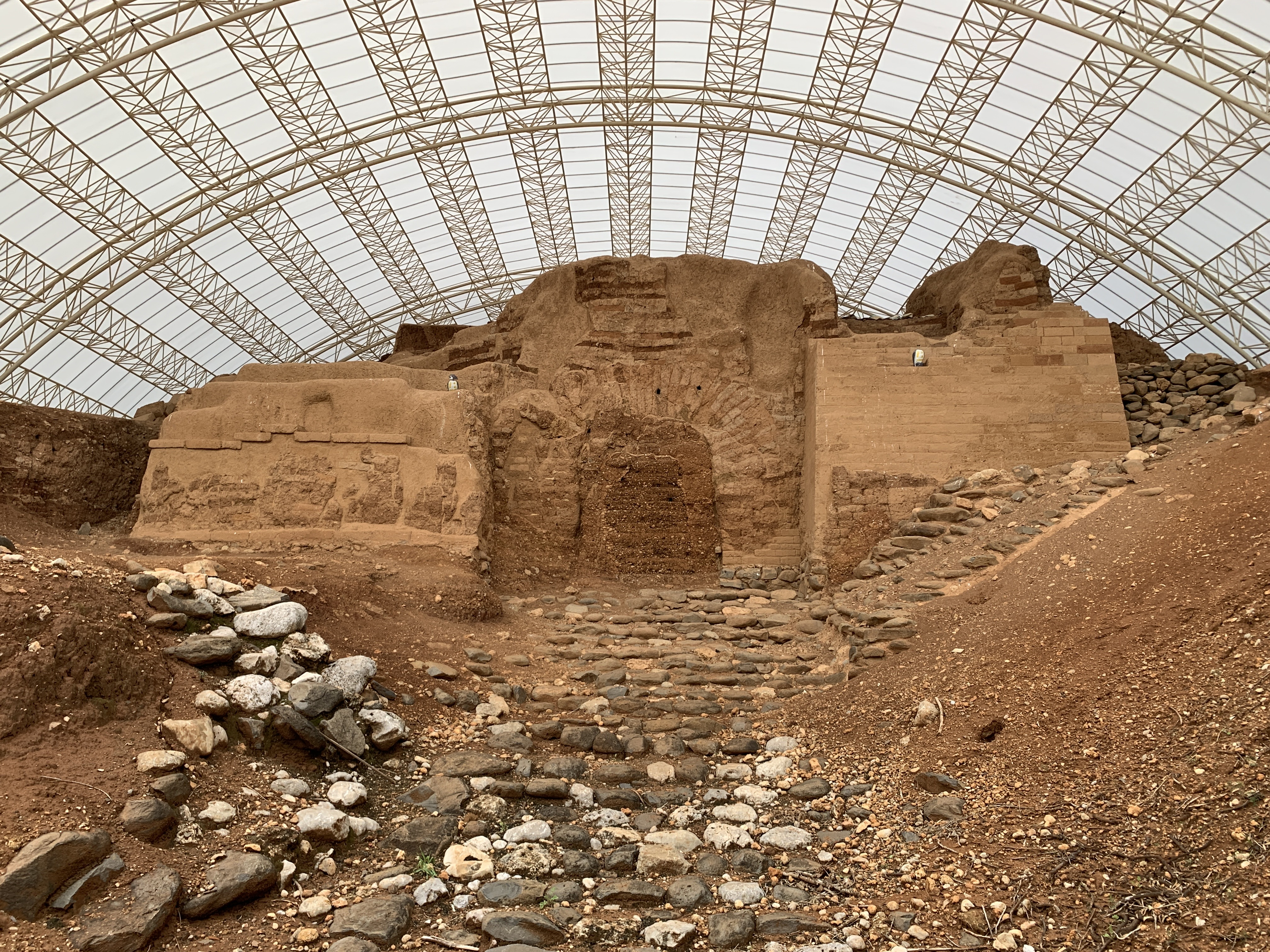
Abraham's Gate, Tel Dan, Israel

Abraham's story, like those of the other patriarchs, most likely had a substantial oral prehistory: he is mentioned in the Book of Ezekiel and in the Book of Isaiah.) As with Moses, Abraham's name is apparently very ancient, as the tradition found in the Book of Genesis no longer understands its original meaning, which is likely "father is exalted" – the meaning offered in Genesis 17:5, "Father of a multitude", is a folk etymology. At some stage the oral traditions became part of the written tradition of the Pentateuch; a majority of scholars believe this stage belongs to the Persian period, roughly 520–320 BCE. The mechanisms by which this came about remain unknown, but there are currently at least two hypotheses. The first, called Persian Imperial authorisation, is that the post-Exilic community devised the Torah as a legal basis on which to function within the Persian Imperial system; the second is that the Pentateuch was written to provide the criteria for determining who would belong to the post-Exilic Jewish community and to establish the power structures and relative positions of its various groups, notably the priesthood and the lay "elders".

The completion of the Torah and its elevation to the centre of post-Exilic Judaism was as much or more about combining older texts as writing new ones – the final Pentateuch was based on existing traditions. In the Book of Ezekiel, written during the Exile (i.e., in the first half of the 6th century BCE), Ezekiel, an exile in Babylon, tells how those who remained in Judah are claiming ownership of the land based on inheritance from Abraham; but the prophet tells them they have no claim because they do not observe Torah. The Book of Isaiah similarly testifies to tension between the people of Judah and the returning post-Exilic Jews (the "gôlâ"), stating that God is the father of Israel and that Israel's history begins with the Exodus and not with Abraham. The conclusion to be inferred from this and similar evidence (e.g., Ezra–Nehemiah) is that the figure of Abraham must have been preeminent among the great landowners of Judah at the time of the Exile and after, serving to support their claims to the land in opposition to those of the returning exiles.

=== Amorite origin hypothesis ===
According to Nissim Amzallag, the Book of Genesis portrays Abraham as having an Amorite origin, arguing that the patriarch's provenance from the region of Harran as described in Genesis 11:31 associates him with the territory of the Amorite homeland. He also notes parallels between the biblical narrative and the Amorite migration into the Southern Levant in the 2nd millennium BCE. Likewise, some scholars like Daniel E. Fleming and Alice Mandell have argued that the biblical portrayal of the Patriarchs' lifestyle appears to reflect the Amorite culture of the 2nd millennium BCE as attested in texts from the ancient city-state of Mari, suggesting that the Genesis stories retain historical memories of the ancestral origins of some of the Israelites. Alan Millard argues that the name Abram is of Amorite origin and that it is attested in Mari as ʾabī-rām. He also suggests that the Patriarch's name corresponds to a form typical of the Middle Bronze Age and not of later periods. Some papers identify Abraham with the Amorite chieftain Abum, and his son Ishmael with Sumulael.

=== Canaanite origin hypothesis ===
The earliest possible reference to Abraham may be the name of a town in the Negev listed in the Bubastite Portal inscription of Pharaoh Sheshonq I (biblical Shishak), which is referred as "the Fortress of Abraham" (i-bi-ra-ma), suggesting the possible existence of an Abraham tradition in the 10th century BCE. The orientalist Mario Liverani has proposed to see in the name Abraham the eponymous ancestor of a 13th-century BCE tribe, the Raham, mentioned in a stele of Seti I found at Beth-Shean and dating back to around 1289 BCE. The tribe probably lived in the area surrounding or close to Beth-Shean, in Galilee (the stele in fact refers to battles that took place in the area). Liverani hypothesized that the members of the tribe of Raham called themselves "sons of Raham" (*Banu-Raham), so that the name of their eponymous ancestor would have been "father of Raham" (*Abu-Raham), that being the name of the patriarch Abraham. Israel Finkelstein and Thomas Römer suggested that the oldest Abraham traditions originated in the Iron Age (monarchic period) and that they contained an autochthonous hero story, as the oldest biblical references to Abraham outside the book of Genesis (Ezekiel 33 and Isaiah 51) do not have an indication of a Mesopotamian origin of Abraham and present only two main themes of the Abraham narrative in Genesis—land and offspring. Finkelstein and Römer considered Abraham as ancestor who was worshiped in Hebron, with the oldest tradition of him possibly being about the altar he built in Hebron.

== Religious traditions and commentary ==
Abraham is given a high position of respect in three major world faiths, Judaism, Christianity, and Islam. In Judaism, he is the founding father of the covenant, the special relationship between the Jewish people and God—leading to the belief that the Jews are the chosen people of God. In Christianity, Paul the Apostle taught that Abraham's faith in God, preceding receipt of the Mosaic law, made him the prototype of all believers, Jewish or gentile; and in Islam, he is seen as a link in the chain of prophets that begins with Adam and culminates in Muhammad.

According to the Bible, reflecting the change of his name to "Abraham" meaning "a father of many nations", Abraham is considered to be the progenitor of many nations, among them the Israelites, Ishmaelites, Edomites, Amalekites, Kenizzites, Midianites. Through his nephew Lot, he was also related to the Moabites and Ammonites. Specifically through Jacob, renamed "Israel" in Genesis 35:10, both "a nation and a company of nations" would arise, and the promise that his descendants would become a multitude of nations is maintained through Jacob's blessing of his grandson, Ephraim, in Genesis 48:19.

=== Judaism ===
In Jewish tradition, Abraham is called Avraham Avinu (אברהם אבינו), "our father Abraham", signifying that he is both the biological progenitor of the Jews and the father of Judaism. He is sometimes described as the first Jew, though given that Jewish laws had not yet been given in his lifetime, that anachronism might have served to associate him with the laws to give the prestige of origins. His story is read in the weekly Torah reading portions, predominantly in the parashot: Lech-Lecha (לֶךְ-לְךָ), Vayeira (וַיֵּרָא), Chayei Sarah (חַיֵּי שָׂרָה), and Toledot (תּוֹלְדֹת).

Hanan bar Rava, 3rd century, taught in Abba Arikha's name that Abraham's mother was named Amatlai bat Karnevo. (Note: MSS variants: bat Barnebo, bat bar-Nebo, bar-bar-Nebo, bat Karnebi, bat Kar Nebo. Karnebo (outpost of Nabu) is attested as a Sumerian theophoric place-name in Akkadian inscriptions, including the Michaux stone. It referred to at least two separate cities in antiquity. Rabbinic tradition connects Karnebo to the Biblical Hebrew Kar (כר lamb), translating it pure lambs.) Hiyya bar Abba taught that Abraham worked in Teraḥ's idol shop in his youth.

According to the Legends of the Jews, God created heaven and earth for the sake of the merits of Abraham. After the biblical flood, Abraham was the only one among the pious who solemnly swore never to forsake God, studied in the house of Noah and Shem to learn about the "Ways of God", and continued the line of High Priest from Noah and Shem, assigning the office to Levi and his seed forever. Before leaving his father's land, Abraham was miraculously saved from the fiery furnace of Nimrod following his brave action of breaking the idols of the Chaldeans into pieces. During his sojourning in Canaan, Abraham was accustomed to extend hospitality to travelers and strangers and taught how to praise God also knowledge of God to those who had received his kindness. Along with Isaac and Jacob, he is the one whose name would appear united with God, as God in Judaism is called Elohei Avraham, Elohei Yitzchak, vEilohei Ya'akov ("God of Abraham, God of Isaac, and God of Jacob"). He was also mentioned as the father of thirty nations.

=== Mandaeism ===
In Mandaeism, Abraham (Classical Mandaic: ࡀࡁࡓࡀࡄࡉࡌ, romanized: Abrahim) is mentioned in Book 18 of the Right Ginza as the patriarch of the Jewish people. Mandaeans consider Abraham to have been originally a Mandaean priest, however they differ with Abraham and Jews regarding circumcision which they consider to be bodily mutilation and therefore forbidden.

=== Christianity ===
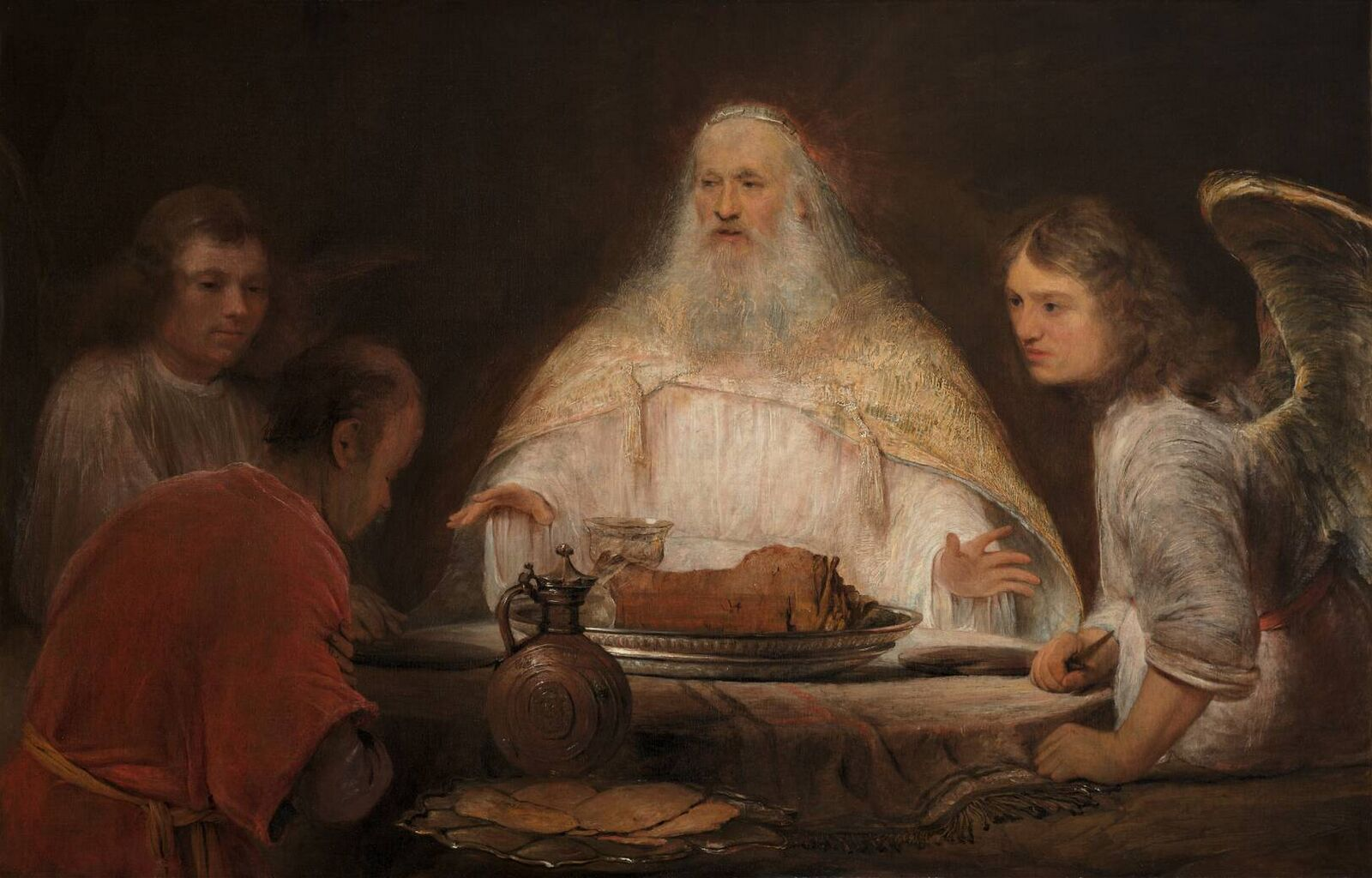
Abraham and the Angels, by Aert de Gelder, c. 1680–1685 (Museum Boijmans Van Beuningen, Rotterdam)

In Christianity, Abraham is revered as the prophet to whom God chose to reveal himself and with whom God initiated a covenant (cf. covenant theology). Paul the Apostle declared that all who believe in Jesus (Christians) are "included in the seed of Abraham and are inheritors of the promise made to Abraham". In Romans 4, Abraham is praised for his "unwavering faith" in God, and Paul asserts there, and also in Galatians 3:6, that his faith was considered to be the basis of his being "accepted as righteous": he becomes thereby a partaker of the covenant of grace, being able to "demonstrate faith in the saving power of Christ".

Throughout history, church leaders, following Paul, have emphasized Abraham as the spiritual father of all Christians. Augustine of Hippo declared that Christians are "children (or 'seed') of Abraham by faith", Ambrose stated that "by means of their faith Christians possess the promises made to Abraham", and Martin Luther recalled Abraham as "a paradigm of the man of faith". (Note: Jeffrey 1992, p. 10 states "St. Augustine, following Paul, regards all Christians as children (or 'seed') of Abraham by faith, although 'born of strangers' (e.g. in Joan. Ev. [Treatises on the Gospel of John] 108). St. Ambrose likewise says that by means of their faith Christians possess the promises made to Abraham. Abraham's initial departure from his homeland is understood by St. Caesarius of Arles as a type of Christian leaving the world of carnal habits to follow Christ. Later commentators as diverse as Luther and Kierkegaard recall Abraham as a paradigm of the man of faith.")

The Roman Catholic Church, the largest Christian denomination, calls Abraham "our father in Faith" in the Eucharistic prayer of the Roman Canon, recited during the Mass. He is also commemorated in the calendars of saints of several denominations: on 20 August by the Maronite Church, 28 August in the Coptic Church and the Assyrian Church of the East (with the full office for the latter), and on 9 October by the Roman Catholic Church and the Lutheran Church–Missouri Synod. In the introduction to his 15th-century translation of the Golden Legend's account of Abraham, William Caxton noted that this patriarch's life was read in church on Quinquagesima Sunday. He is the patron saint of those in the hospitality industry. The Eastern Orthodox Church commemorates him as the "Righteous Forefather Abraham", with two feast days in its liturgical calendar. The first time is on 9 October (for those churches which follow the traditional Julian Calendar, 9 October falls on 22 October of the modern Gregorian Calendar), where he is commemorated together with his nephew "Righteous Lot". The other is on the "Sunday of the Forefathers" (two Sundays before Christmas), when he is commemorated together with other ancestors of Jesus. Abraham is also mentioned in the Divine Liturgy of Basil the Great, just before the Anaphora, and Abraham and Sarah are invoked in the prayers said by the priest over a newly married couple. A popular hymn sung in many English-speaking Sunday Schools by children is known as "Father Abraham" and emphasizes the patriarch as the spiritual progenitor of Christians.

==== Scholarly perspectives ====
Jean-Louise Ska, of the Pontifical Biblical Institute, writes that amongst the three visitors who are received by Abraham, one of them is YHWH himself and it is an example of a theophany in the Hebrew Bible. In contrast, the Christian author of Epistle to the Hebrews interprets them as angels, probably influenced by the story in Genesis 19 where two angels are specifically identified. Several Targums and midrashim also identify all three figures as messengers. Mark S. Smith, of the Princeton Theological Seminary, views the narrative as one of the few sections in the Hebrew Bible where God appears to Abraham in a body of human scale.

=== Islam ===
Simple diagram showing the descent from Abraham to Ishmael and Isaac, with twelve tribal descendants

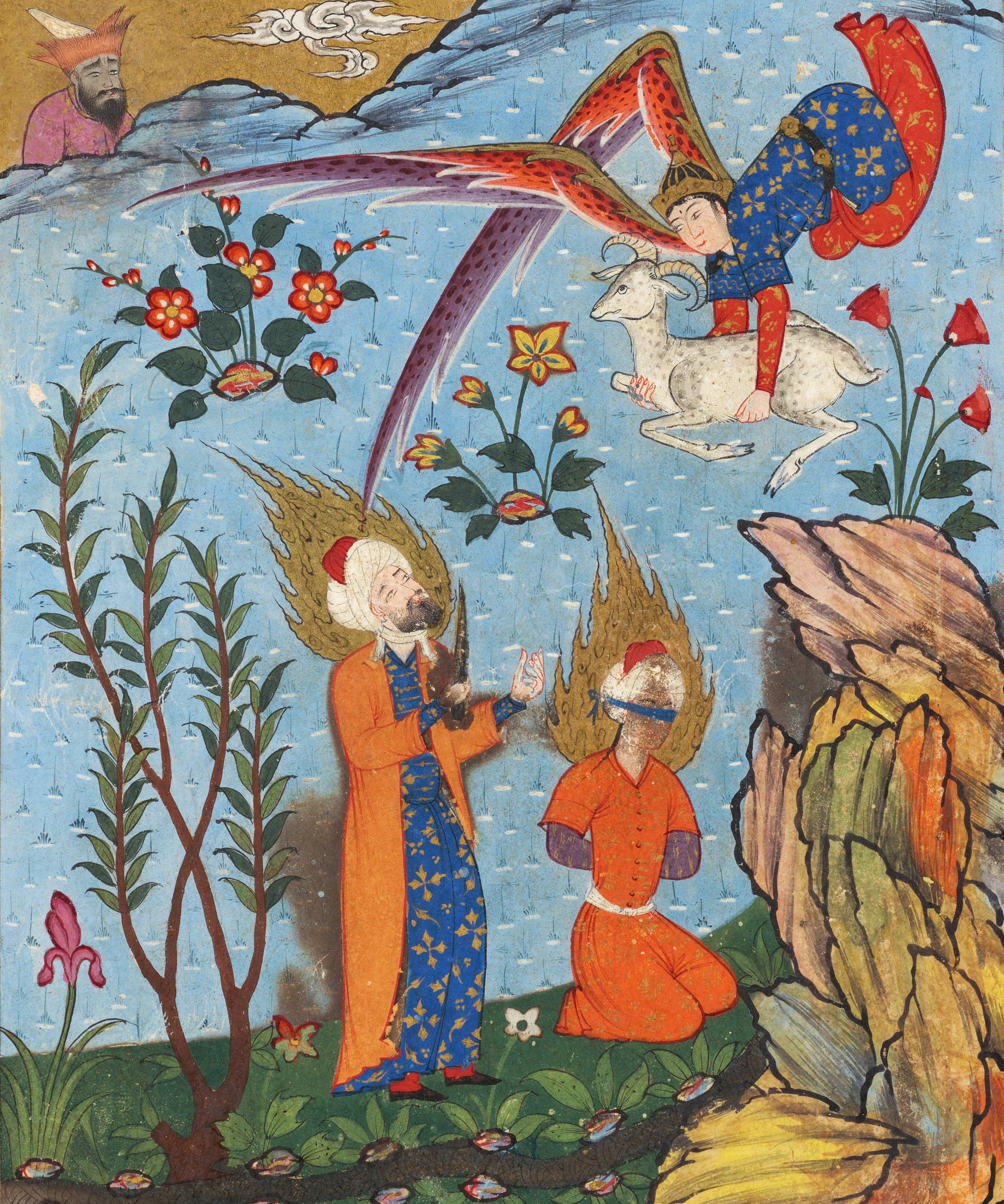
Islamic miniature of Ibrahim's sacrifice of his son being stopped by the angel Jibril, delivering a sheep instead, from a Persian 1577 Stories of the Prophets manuscript

Islam regards ʾIbrāhīm (Abraham) as a link in the chain of prophets that begins with Adam and culminates in Muhammad via ʾIsmāʿīl (Ishmael). Abraham is mentioned in 35 chapters of the Quran, more often than any other biblical personage apart from Moses. He is called both a hanif (monotheist) and muslim (one who submits), and Muslims regard him as a prophet and patriarch, the archetype of the perfect Muslim, and the revered reformer of the Kaaba in Mecca. Islamic tradition considers Abraham the first "pioneer of Islam" (which is also called millat ʾIbrāhīm, the 'religion of Abraham'), and that his purpose and mission throughout his life was to proclaim the oneness of God. In Islam, Abraham holds an exalted position among the major prophets and he is referred to as Khalīlullāh, meaning 'Friend of God'. Besides Ishaq and Yaqub (Isaac and Jacob), Abraham is among the most excellent and honorable men in the view of God. He is also mentioned in Quran as the "Father of Muslims", and is put forward as a role model for the community.

=== Druze faith ===
The Druze regard Abraham as the third spokesman (natiq) after Adam and Noah, who helped transmit the foundational teachings of monotheism (tawhid) intended for the larger audience. He is also among the seven prophets who appeared in different periods of history according to the Druze faith.

=== Baháʼí Faith ===
Baháʼís consider Abraham a Manifestation of God, and the originator of monotheistic religion. ʻAbdu'l-Bahá states that Abraham was born in Mesopotamia, and Bahá'u'lláh states that the language which Abraham spoke, when "he crossed the Jordan", is Hebrew ('Ibrání), so "the language of the crossing". To ʻAbdu'l-Bahá, the Abraham was born to a family that was ignorant of the oneness of God. Abraham opposed his own people and government, and even his own kin, he rejected all their gods, and, alone and single-handed, he withstood a powerful nation. These people believed not in one God but in many gods, to whom they ascribed miracles, and hence they all rose up against Abraham. No one supported him except his nephew Lot and "one or two other individuals of no consequence". At last the intensity of his enemies' opposition obliged him, utterly wronged, to forsake his native land. Abraham then came to "these regions", that is, to the Holy Land. To Bahá'u'lláh, the "Voice of God" commanded Abraham to offer up Ishmael as a sacrifice, so that his steadfastness in the faith of God and his detachment from all else but him may be demonstrated unto men. The purpose of God, moreover, was to sacrifice him as a ransom for the sins and iniquities of all the peoples of the earth.

In the Baháʼí texts, like the Islamic texts, Abraham is often referred to as "the Friend of God". 'Abdu'l-Bahá described Abraham as the founder of monotheism.

ʻAbdu'l-Bahá also suggested the "holy manifestations who have been the sources or founders of the various religious systems" were united and agreed in purpose and teaching, and the Abraham, Moses, Zoroaster, the Buddha, Jesus, Muhammad, the Báb and Bahá'u'lláh are one in "spirit and reality".

== Artistic depictions ==
=== Painting and sculpture ===
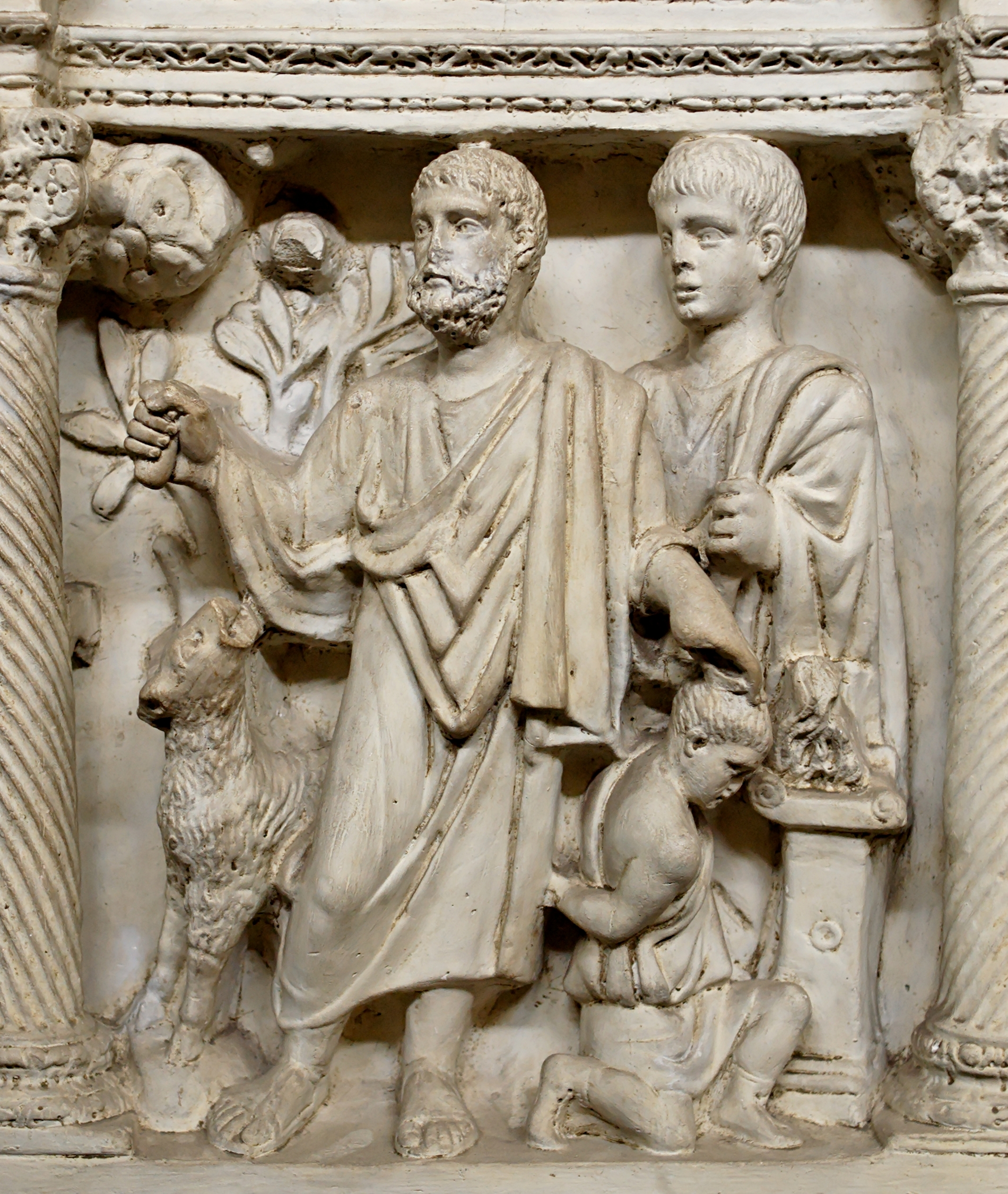
16th-century plaster cast of a late Roman-era Sacrifice of Isaac. The hand of God originally came down to restrain Abraham's knife (both are now missing).

Paintings on the life of Abraham tend to focus on only a few incidents: the sacrifice of Isaac; meeting Melchizedek; entertaining the three angels; Hagar in the desert; and a few others. (Note: For a thorough collection of links to artwork about Abraham see: "Artwork Depicting Scenes from Abraham's Life". Archived from the original on 15 January 2025.) Additionally, Martin O'Kane, a professor of Biblical Studies, writes that the parable of Lazarus resting in the "Bosom of Abraham", as described in the Gospel of Luke, became an iconic image in Christian works. According to O'Kane, artists often chose to divert from the common literary portrayal of Lazarus sitting next to Abraham at a banquet in Heaven and instead focus on the "somewhat incongruous notion of Abraham, the most venerated of patriarchs, holding a naked and vulnerable child in his bosom". Several artists have been inspired by the life of Abraham, including Albrecht Dürer (1471–1528), Caravaggio (1573–1610), Donatello, Raphael, Philip van Dyck (Dutch painter, 1680–1753), and Claude Lorrain (French painter, 1600–1682). Rembrandt (Dutch, 1606–1669) created at least seven works on Abraham, Peter Paul Rubens (1577–1640) did several, Marc Chagall did at least five on Abraham, Gustave Doré (French illustrator, 1832–1883) did six, and James Tissot (French painter and illustrator, 1836–1902) did over twenty works on the subject.

The Sarcophagus of Junius Bassus depicts a set of biblical stories, including Abraham about to sacrifice Isaac. These sculpted scenes are on the outside of a marble Early Christian sarcophagus used for the burial of Junius Bassus. He died in 359. This sarcophagus has been described as "probably the single most famous piece of early Christian relief sculpture." The sarcophagus was originally placed in or under Old St. Peter's Basilica, was rediscovered in 1597, and is now below the modern basilica in the Museo Storico del Tesoro della Basilica di San Pietro (Museum of St. Peter's Basilica) in the Vatican. The base is approximately 4 ft × 8 ft × 4 ft (1.2 m × 2.4 m × 1.2 m).

George Segal created figural sculptures by molding plastered gauze strips over live models in his 1987 work Abraham's Farewell to Ishmael. The human condition was central to his concerns, and Segal used the Old Testament as a source for his imagery. This sculpture depicts the dilemma faced by Abraham when Sarah demanded that he expel Hagar and Ishmael. In the sculpture, the father's tenderness, Sarah's rage, and Hagar's resigned acceptance portray a range of human emotions. The sculpture was donated to the Miami Art Museum after the artist's death in 2000.

=== Christian iconography ===
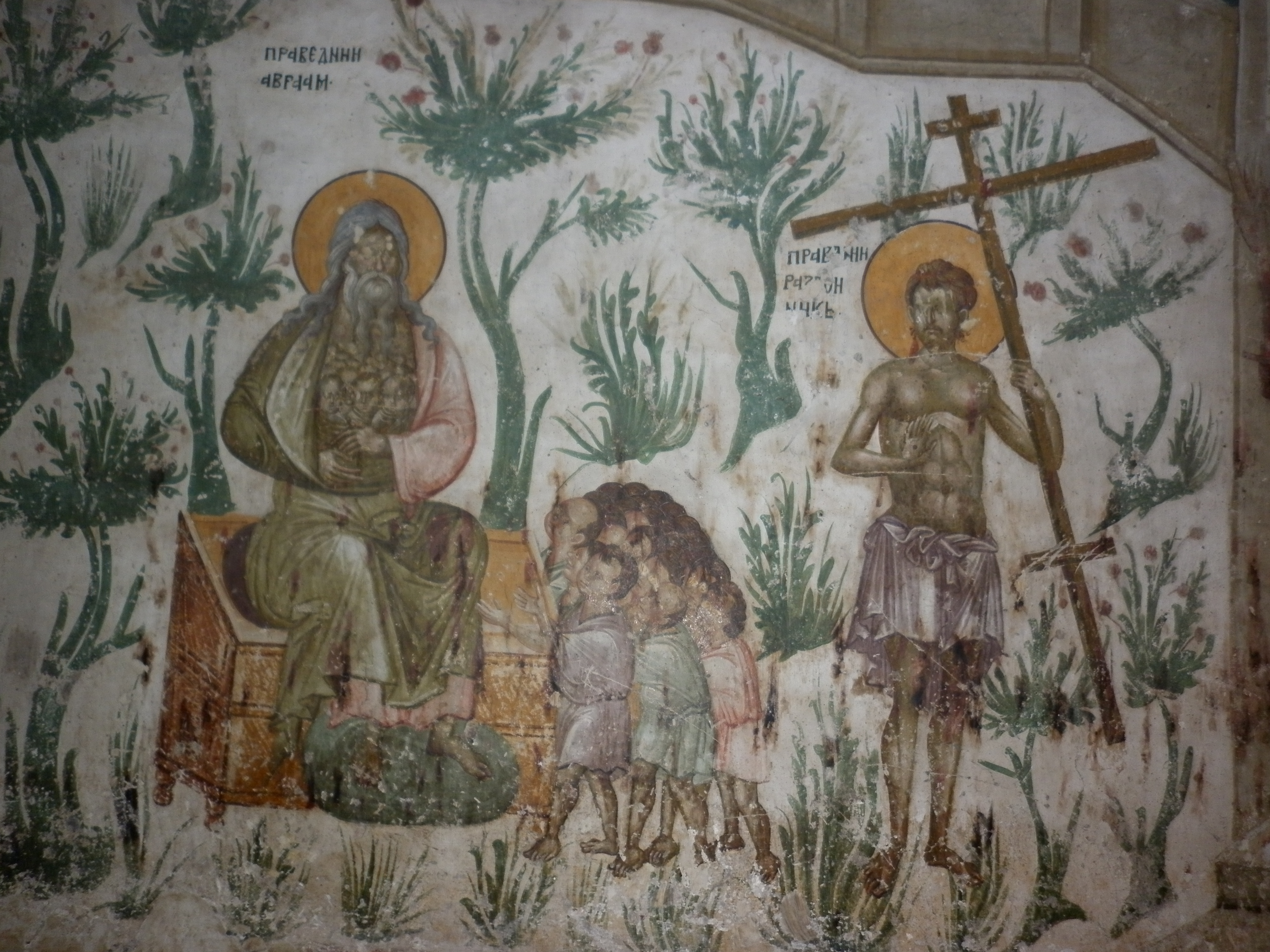
Abraham in paradise, Gračanica Monastery, Serbia

Abraham can sometimes be identified by the context of the image – the meeting with Melchizedek, the three visitors, or the sacrifice of Isaac. In solo portraits a sword or knife may be used as his accessory, as in this statue by Giovanni Maria Morlaiter or this painting by Lorenzo Monaco.

As early as the beginning of the 3rd century, Christian art followed Christian typology in making the sacrifice of Isaac a foreshadowing of Christ's sacrifice on the cross, and its memorial in the sacrifice of the Mass. See for example this 11th-century Christian altar engraved with Abraham's and other sacrifices taken to prefigure that of Christ in the Eucharist.

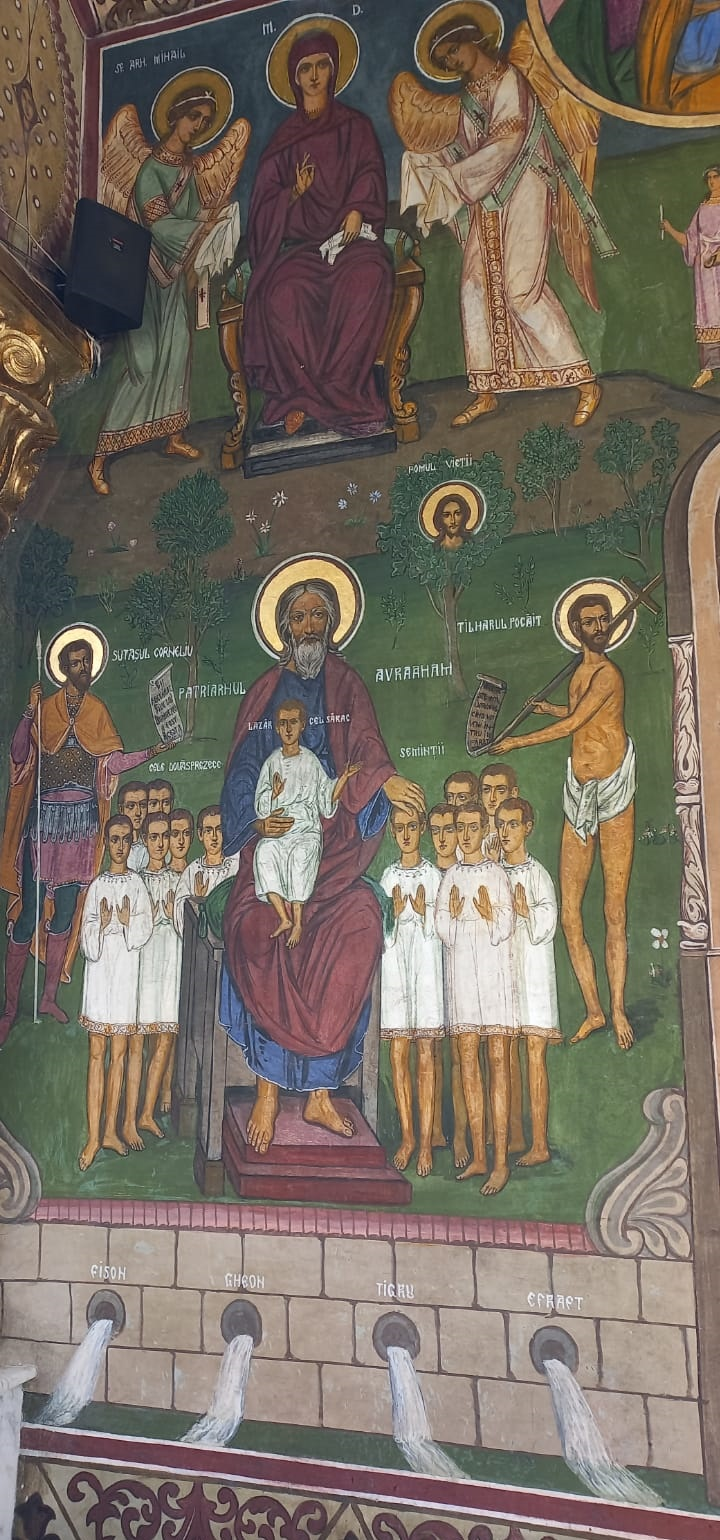
Mural of Abraham in Heaven from the Holy Mother Church, Ploiești, Romania

Some early Christian writers interpreted the three visitors as the triune God. Thus in Santa Maria Maggiore, Rome, a 5th-century mosaic portrays only the visitors against a gold ground and puts semitransparent copies of them in the "heavenly" space above the scene. In Eastern Orthodox art, the visit is the chief means by which the Trinity is pictured (example). Some images do not include Abraham and Sarah, like Andrei Rublev's Trinity, which shows only the three visitors as beardless youths at a table.

=== Literature ===
Fear and Trembling (original Danish title: Frygt og Bæven) is an influential philosophical work by Søren Kierkegaard, published in 1843 under the pseudonym Johannes de silentio (John the Silent). Kierkegaard wanted to understand the anxiety that must have been present in Abraham when God asked him to sacrifice his son. W. G. Hardy's novel Father Abraham (1935) tells the fictionalized life story of Abraham. In her short story collection Sarah and After, Lynne Reid Banks tells the story of Abraham and Sarah, with an emphasis on Sarah's view of events.

=== Music ===
In 1681, Marc-Antoine Charpentier released a Dramatic motet (Oratorio), Sacrificim Abrahae H.402 – 402 a – 402 b, for soloists, chorus, doubling instruments and continuo. Sébastien de Brossard composed a cantata Abraham ou le sacrifice d'Isaac between 1703 and 1708.

In 1994, Steve Reich released an opera named The Cave. The title refers to the Cave of the Patriarchs. The narrative of the opera is based on the story of Abraham, and his immediate family, as it is recounted in religious texts, and understood by individuals from different cultures and religious traditions.

The eponymous track on Bob Dylan's 1965 album Highway 61 Revisited contains five stanzas, with someone in each describing an unusual problem that is ultimately resolved on Highway 61. In the first stanza, God tells Abraham to "kill me a son". God wants the killing done on Highway 61. Abram, the birth name of Abraham, is also the name of Dylan's father. In 2004, Rolling Stone magazine ranked "Highway 61 Revisited" at number 364 in their 500 Greatest Songs of All Time.

== See also ==
- Abraham I, II, III (disambiguations)
- Abraham Path
- Abraham's Gate at Tel Dan
- Apocalypse of Abraham
- Book of Abraham
- Nimrod vs. Abraham
- Gathering of Israel
- Genealogies of Genesis
- Ibarum
- Ibrium
- List of oldest fathers
- Pearl of Great Price (Mormonism)
- Table of prophets of Abrahamic religions
- Testament of Abraham

== Bibliography ==
- ʻAbdu'l-Bahá (1978). Barney, Research Department of the Universal House of Justice (ed.). Selections from the Writings of 'Abdu'l‑Bahá. Translated by Bahá'í World Centre and by Gail, Marzieh. Baháʼí World Centre.
- ʻAbdu'l-Bahá (2014) [1908]. Barney, Laura Clifford (ed.). Some Answered Questions (Newly revised ed.). Haifa, Israel: Baháʼí World Centre. ISBN 978-0-87743-374-3. This article incorporates text from this source, which is in the public domain.
- ʻAbdu'l-Bahá (1912). MacNutt, Howard (ed.). The Promulgation of Universal Peace.
- Baháʼu'lláh (1976). Shogi Effendi (ed.). Gleanings from the Writings of Baháʼu'lláh. Translated by Shoghi Effendi. Wilmette, Illinois, USA: Baháʼí Publishing Trust. ISBN 0-87743-187-6.
- Berlin, Adele; Brettler, Marc Zvi (2014). The Jewish Study Bible (2nd ed.). New York, New York: Oxford University Press USA. ISBN 978-0-19-939387-9.
- Carr, David M.; Conway, Colleen M. (2010). "Introduction to the Pentateuch". An Introduction to the Bible: Sacred Texts and Imperial Contexts. John Wiley & Sons. ISBN 978-1405167383.
- Dever, William G. (2001). What Did the Biblical Writers Know, and when Did They Know It?: What Archaeology Can Tell Us about the Reality of Ancient Israel. Wm. B. Eerdmans Publishing. ISBN 978-0-8028-2126-3.
- Enns, Peter (2012). The Evolution of Adam. Baker Books. ISBN 978-1-58743-315-3.
- Exum, Jo Cheryl (2007). Retellings: The Bible in Literature, Music, Art and Film. Brill Publishers. ISBN 978-90-04-16572-4.
- Ginzberg, Louis (1909). The Legends of the Jews (PDF). Translated by Henrietta Szold. Philadelphia: Jewish Publication Society. Archived (PDF) from the original on 9 October 2022.
- Hendel, Ronald (2005). Remembering Abraham: Culture, Memory, and History in the Hebrew Bible. Oxford University Press. ISBN 978-0-19-803959-4.
- Holweck, Frederick George (1924). A Biographical Dictionary of the Saints. B. Herder Book Co.
- The Book of Jasher. New York: Noah and Gould. 1840.
- Jeffrey, David Lyle (1992). A Dictionary of Biblical Tradition in English Literature. Wm. B. Eerdmans. ISBN 978-0-8028-3634-2.
- Kierkegaard, Søren (1980). The Concept of Anxiety: A Simple Psychologically Orienting Deliberation on the Dogmatic Issue of Hereditary Sin. Princeton University Press. ISBN 978-0-691-02011-2.
- Levenson, Jon Douglas (2012). Inheriting Abraham: The Legacy of the Patriarch in Judaism, Christianity, and Islam. Princeton University Press. ISBN 978-0691155692.
- Lings, Martin (2004). Mecca: From Before Genesis Until Now. Archetype. ISBN 978-1-901383-07-2.
- Maulana, Mohammad (2006). Encyclopaedia of Quranic Studies (Set of 26 Vols.). Anmol Publications. ISBN 978-81-261-2771-9.
- McCarter, P. Kyle (2000). "Abraham". In Freedman, Noel David; Myers, Allen C. (eds.). Eerdmans Dictionary of the Bible. Amsterdam University Press. pp. 8–10. ISBN 978-90-5356-503-2.
- McNutt, Paula M. (1999). Reconstructing the Society of Ancient Israel. Westminster John Knox Press. ISBN 978-0-664-22265-9.
- Mendes-Flohr, Paul (2005). "Judaism". In Thomas Riggs (ed.). Worldmark Encyclopedia of Religious Practices. Vol. 1. Farmington Hills, Mi: Thomson Gale. ISBN 978-0787666118 – via Encyclopedia.com.
- Moore, Megan Bishop; Kelle, Brad E. (2011). Biblical History and Israel's Past. Grand Rapids, Mich.: William B. Eerdmans Pub. Company. ISBN 978-0-8028-6260-0. OCLC 693560718.
- Peters, Francis Edward (2003). Islam, a Guide for Jews and Christians. Princeton University Press. ISBN 978-1400825486.
- Pitard, Wayne T. (2001). "Before Israel". In Coogan, Michael D. (ed.). The Oxford History of the Biblical World. Oxford University Press. ISBN 978-0-19-513937-2.
- Rutgers, Leonard Victor (1993). "The Iconography of the Sarcophagus of Junius Bassus (review)". Journal of Early Christian Studies. 1 (1): 94–96. doi:10.1353/earl.0.0155. ISSN 1086-3184. S2CID 170301601.
- Ska, Jean Louis (2006). Introduction to Reading the Pentateuch. Eisenbrauns. ISBN 978-1-57506-122-1.
- Ska, Jean Louis (2009). The Exegesis of the Pentateuch: Exegetical Studies and Basic Questions. Mohr Siebeck. ISBN 978-3-16-149905-0.
- Swayd, Samy S. (2009). The a to Z of the Druzes. Rowman & Littlefield. ISBN 978-0810868366.
- Smith, Peter (2000a). A Concise Encyclopedia of the Bahá'í Faith. Oneworld Publications. ISBN 978-1780744803.
- Thompson, Thomas L. (2016) [1974]. The Historicity of the Patriarchal Narratives: The Quest for the Historical Abraham. Berlin/Boston: Walter de Gruyter GmbH & Co KG. ISBN 978-3-11-084144-2.
- Waters, Guy P.; Reid, J. Nicholas; Muether, John R. (2020). Covenant Theology: Biblical, Theological, and Historical Perspectives. Crossway. ISBN 978-1-4335-6006-4.
- Wright, Christopher J. H. (2010). The Mission of God's People: A Biblical Theology of the Church's Mission. Zondervan. ISBN 978-0-310-32303-7.
