= Hanan bar Rava =

Talmudic sage

Rav Ḥanan b. Rava
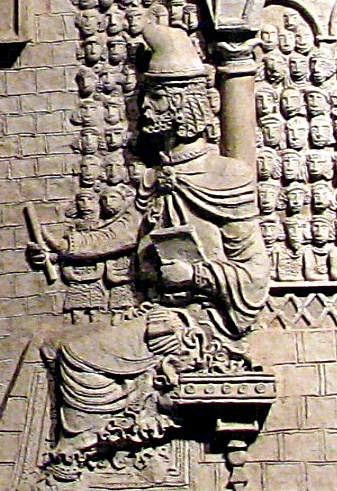
- Relief of a Babylonian Amora at the Sura Academy (20th century)
- Title: Rav

Personal life
- Born: Judea
- Died: Babylonia

Religious life
- Religion: Judaism

Jewish leader
- Position: Second-generation Babylonian Amora

Ḥanan bar Rava (Note: The name is pronounced Rava by convention, to distinguish it from רבה Rabbah. Etymologically it is formed from R.+Abba) (חנן/חנא/חנין בר רב/א) or Ḥanan bar Abba (חנן בר א/בא) was a Talmudic sage and second-generation Babylonian Amora. He lived in Israel, moved to Babylonia with Abba b. Aybo, and died there ca. 290 CE. He is distinct from the late-generation Babylonian Amora of the same name who apparently conversed with Ashi (352-427 CE).

Ḥanan b. Rava's father was not Abba b. Joseph b. Ḥama (called Rava in the Talmud), who lived a century later. Ḥanan b. Rava was the son-in-law of Abba b. Aybo (Rav), tutored Rav's son Hiyya b. Rav, and is often quoted relaying Rav's teachings or describing his customs. He was the father-in-law of Ḥisda, by whom he had at least seven grandsons, (Note: Nachman b. Ḥisda, Ḥanan b. Ḥisda (named after Ḥanan b. Rava), Mari b. Ḥisda, Pineḥas b. Ḥisda, Taḥlifa b. Ḥisda, Yenuqa b. Ḥisda, and Q'shisha b. Ḥisda.) two granddaughters, (Note: These married Ami b. Hama and Uqva b. Hama.) two great-granddaughters, (Note: The daughters of Ami b. Ḥama; one, married to Yanuqa, is referenced by Ketubot 21b; the other is referenced by printings and MS Oxford 366 of Beitzah 29b, though other MSS read Ami b. Abba. The latter woman married Ashi, who had a daughter and at least two sons, Mar b. Ashi and Sama b. Ashi.) and four great-great-grandchildren, including Amemar b. Yenuqa. (Note: The grandson of Ami b. Ḥama.)

Bizna, Z'era, Kahana b. Taḥlifa, Nachman b. Yaakov, G'neva, Ḥisda, Abin, and others relay his teachings in the Talmud.

In 1997, the Supreme Court of Israel cited Ḥanan b. Rava's dictum, "All know for what purpose a bride enters the bridal canopy. Yet against whomsoever speaks obscenely thereof, even if a sentence of seventy years happiness has been sealed for him, it is reversed for evil," in establishing guidelines for legal censorship of pornography.

== Events ==
- Ḥanan b. Rava taught a mishnah to Ḥiyya b. Rav in a booth of Rav's study hall: "An amputee may not exit with his prosthetic [on the Sabbath] -- the words of Meir; but Yose permits." Rav signaled him: "Reverse them."
- Yehudah b. Ezekiel, Yirmiah b. Abba, and Ḥanan b. Rava traveled to the house of Abin of N'shiqya. Couches were brought out for Yehudah b. Ezekiel and Yirmiah b. Abba, but not for Ḥanan b. Rava, who was forced to sit on the ground. Ḥanan b. Rava became incensed, and provoked his host to an halakhic dispute.
- Ḥanan b. Rava thought that relatives were permitted to testify together about the coming of the New Moon because he had misattributed the two positions thereon. He was corrected by Huna.
- When the Exilarch died, Ḥisda instructed him to stand on a platform, tear his garments, and show them to the masses. By this the masses were instructed how to mourn the Exilarch.
- Ḥanan b. Rava went to his son-in-law Ḥisda's house. He took his granddaughter and put her in his lap. Ḥisda accused him of violating religious decency laws, but Ḥanan b. Rava insisted familial affection was permitted. In another version, Ḥanan b. Rava kissed his young granddaughter.
- Ḥanan b. Rava and his associates were sitting and eating on the Sabbath. After they had eaten and said Grace, Ḥanan b. Rava arose and departed. He returned, and found his associates saying Grace again! He asked, "Have we not already said Grace?" and the associates responded, "We said Grace, and then said Grace again, because we initially forgot to insert the Sabbath additions."
- Once Ḥanan b. Rava said to his associates, "Let me tell you something good I saw Rav do." He demonstrated the act. "And I said this before Shmuel b. Abba, and he rose and kissed me on my mouth."
- Rav was going to the house of his son-in-law Ḥanan b. Rava when he saw a ferry-boat approaching. He said, "A ferry-boat is approaching! It is an omen: tonight will be a yom tov for my stomach." Rav came to Ḥanan b. Rava's gate and looked through a crack in the door; he saw a spitted animal. He knocked on the gate, and everyone came to greet him, even the butchers. Rav did not lift his eyes from the animal, saying to them, "You would have fed forbidden meat to my grandchildren!" Rav did not eat from the animal.

== Selected Teachings ==
=== Teachings in Rav's name ===
- If an alley was breached in its side, carrying within that alley on the Sabbath is prohibited if the breach is ten cubits wide. If in the front, even if the breach is only four cubits wide."
- Four winds blow on each day, and the north wind with each of the others. Were this not so, the world would not survive a single hour.
- All leaders, even minor officials, are chosen by Heaven.
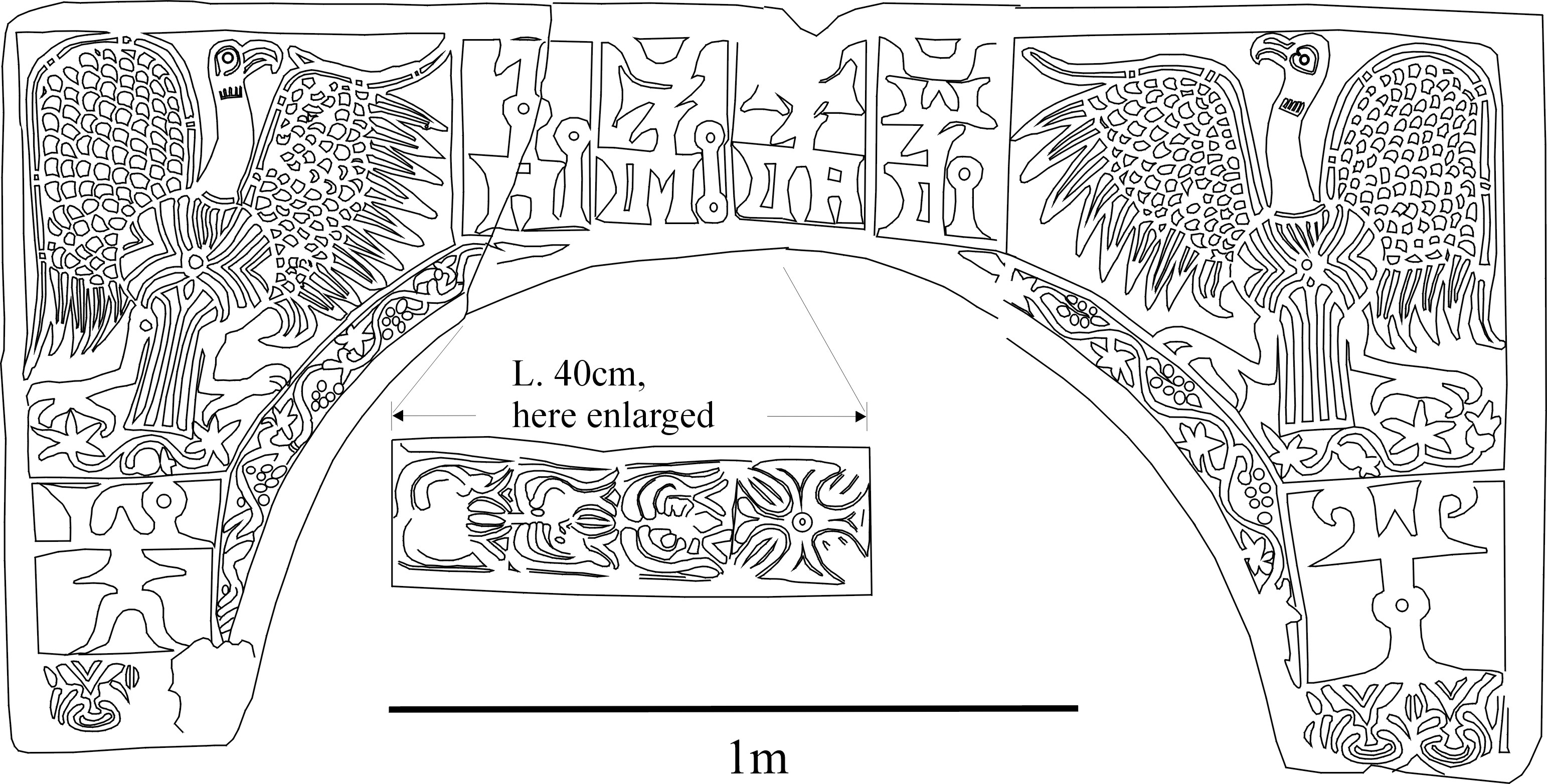
  Vulture (nasr) reliefs from Himyar
- There are five permanent (Note: Ḥisda relays that Ḥanan b. Rava said, "By 'permanent' is meant 'constantly worshipped for the entire year.'") idolatrous temples: the temple of Bel in Babylon, the temple of Nebo in Borsippa (Note: Printings and some MSS read כורסי Kursi, a scatological quip (Kursi resembles both the Aramaic בורסי\ף Borsippa and the Biblical Hebrew קורס squat). Borsippa's name is the butt of several Talmudic jokes; it is also called Bolsippa (as in, Balal S'fas jumbled the language of) and Bor Shapi Empty Pit.), the temple of Atargatis in Manbij, the temple of Serapis (Note: Aramaic: צריפא (hapax). The reading Serapis is supported by: Shaick, Ronit Palistrant. "Who is Standing Above the Lions in Ascalon?". Israel Numismatic Research, 7, 2012.; Rodan, Simona (2019-09-30). Maritime-Related Cults in the Coastal Cities of Philistia during the Roman Period: Legacy and Change. Archaeopress Publishing Ltd. ISBN 978-1-78969-257-0.; Macalister, Robert Alexander Stewart (1980). The Philistines: Their History and Civilization. Library of Alexandria. ISBN 978-1-4655-1749-4.; Greenfield, Jonas Carl (2001). 'Al Kanfei Yonah. BRILL. ISBN 978-90-04-12170-6.; Clermont-Ganneau, Charles (1897). Bibliothèque de l'Ecole des hautes études...: Sciences philologiques et historiques (in French). aE. Bouillon.; Bochart argues for the emendation Aphrodite Urania based on Herodotus' identification of the Ashkelon temple in his Histories (1:105), some 750 years prior. See Venus Castina.: Bochart, Samuel (1712). Samuelis Bocharti Opera omnia. Hoc est Phaleg, Chanaan, et Hierozoicon. Quibus accesserunt Dissertationes variae ad illustrationem sacri codicis aliorumque monumentorum veterum. Praemittitur vita auctoris à Stephano Morino descripta...viri clarissimi Johannes Leusden & Petrus de Villemandy. Editio quarta (in Latin). apud Cornelium Boutesteyn, & Samuelem Luchtmans.) in Ashkelon, and the temple of Nasr (Note: Aramaic: נשרא (hapax). The reading Nasr is supported by: Bochart, Samuel (1712). Samuelis Bocharti Opera omnia. Hoc est Phaleg, Chanaan, et Hierozoicon. Quibus accesserunt Dissertationes variae ad illustrationem sacri codicis aliorumque monumentorum veterum. Praemittitur vita auctoris à Stephano Morino descripta...viri clarissimi Johannes Leusden & Petrus de Villemandy. Editio quarta (in Latin). apud Cornelium Boutesteyn, & Samuelem Luchtmans.; The Journal of Philology. Macmillan and Company. 1880.; Greenfield, Jonas Carl (2001). 'Al Kanfei Yonah. BRILL. ISBN 978-90-04-12170-6.; Epstein, Isidore (1935). The Babylonian Talmud ... Soncino Press.; Neubauer, Adolf (1868). La Géographie du Talmud (in French). Michel Lévy frères. ISBN 978-90-6041-048-6.; Hastings, James (1908). Encyclopaedia of Religion and Ethics: A-Art. C. Scribner's sons.; Clermont-Ganneau, Charles (1897). Bibliothèque de l'Ecole des hautes études...: Sciences philologiques et historiques (in French). aE. Bouillon.; The emendation Dushara is supported by: Rodan, Simona (2019-09-30). Maritime-Related Cults in the Coastal Cities of Philistia during the Roman Period: Legacy and Change. Archaeopress Publishing Ltd. ISBN 978-1-78969-257-0; Kasher, Aryeh (1990). Jews and Hellenistic Cities in Eretz-Israel: Relations of the Jews in Eretz-Israel with the Hellenistic Cities During the Second Temple Period (332 BCE - 70 CE). Mohr Siebeck. ISBN 978-3-16-145241-3.) in Himyar. (Note: Similar lists later appear in the Doctrine of Addai and Jacob of Serugh's On the Fall of the Idols.)
- The order of the blessings is YaQNeHaSZ: first Yayin, then Qiddush, then Ner, then Havdalah, then Sukkah, then Z'man.
- The halakha follows Judah ha-Nasi for Sabbath matters.

==== Biblical lineages ====
- Elimelech, Boaz, and Naomi were descendants of Nahshon.
- Haman's mother was Amatlai (Note: lit. substantiation, proof) bat Orevati. (Note: ʿÔrebtî or variant ʿÔrǝbtāʾ (she-raven) is the name of a major Nehardean house on b. Qiddushin 70b; both here and there it is given the same unique mnemonic.)
- Abraham's mother was Amatlai bat Karnevo (Note: MSS variants: bat Barnebo, bat bar-Nebo, bar-bar-Nebo, bat Karnebi, bat Kar Nebo. Karnebo (outpost of Nabu) is attested as a Sumerian theophoric place-name in Akkadian inscriptions, including the Michaux stone. It referred to at least two separate cities in antiquity. Rabbinic tradition connects Karnebo to the Biblical Hebrew Kar (כר lamb), translating it pure lambs.).
- David's mother was Nitzevet bat Adael.
- Samson's mother was Tzelelponit, (Note: Ṣǝlelpônît lit. shadow facing me. Bamidbar Rabbah claims she is the same as Hatzlelponi, ment. 1 Chronicles 4:3.) and his sister was Nashyan. (Note: Nǝšêq lit. kissed. In all MSS; printings read Našyāyn. Shmuel Eidels points out that Judges 13:2-3 imply Samson had no siblings.)
- Abraham was imprisoned for 10 years: 3 years in Kutha and 7 years in Kardu.
- When Abraham died, the leaders of the world's nations stood in a line and said "Woe to the world that has lost its leader, and woe to the ship that has lost its captain".

=== Other Teachings ===
- There are four types of s'lav: sikhli, partridge, pasianus, and sh'lav. The best of all is the sikhli, and the worst of all is the sh'lav.
- One may roof their Sukkah with thorns and shrubs.
- If the Ḥazzan begins a chapter of Psalms, there is a mitzvah to respond, repeating the first verse.
- Kalenda is held for the eight days after the winter solstice. Saturnalia is held for the eight days before the winter solstice.
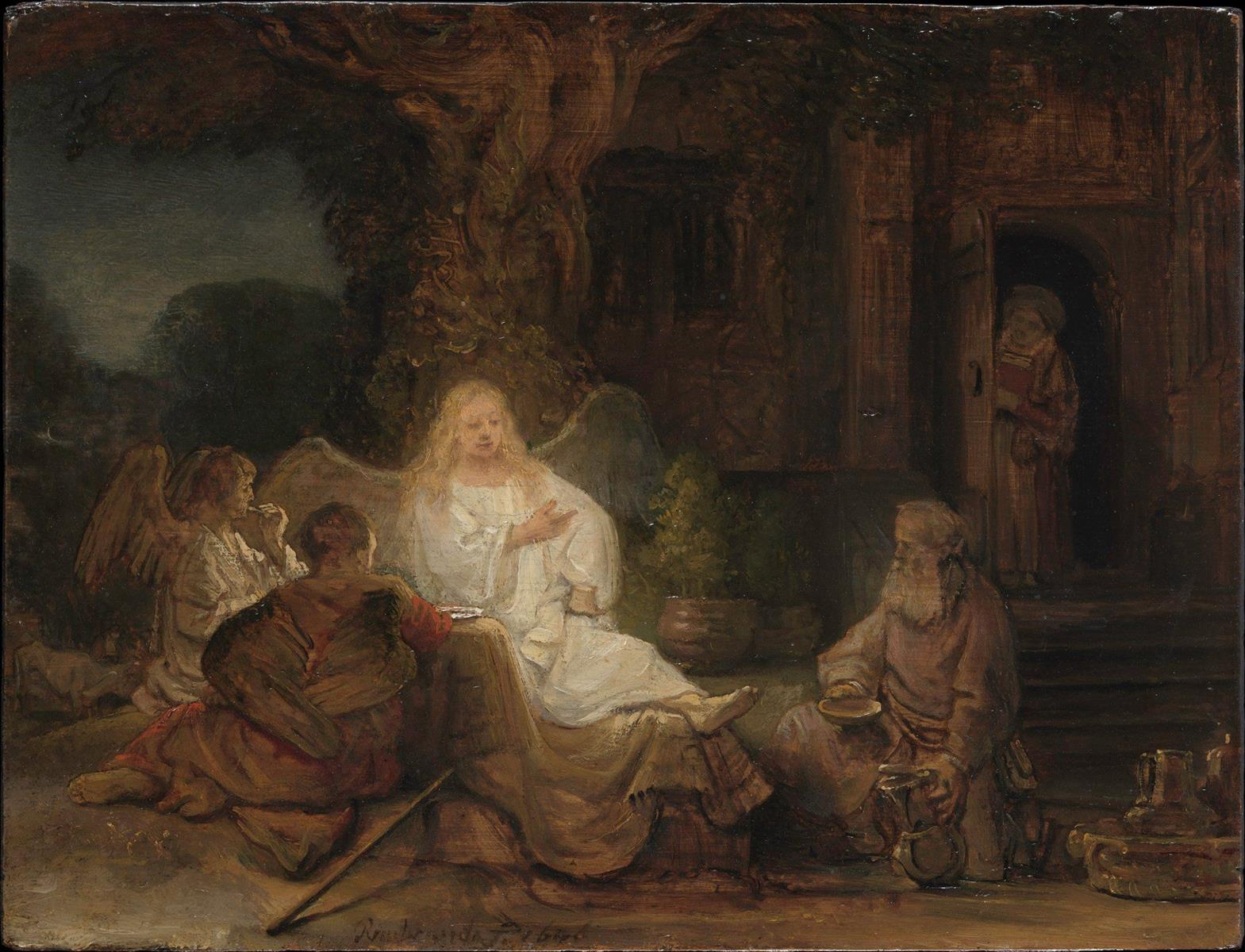
  Abraham Serving the Three Angels, by Rembrandt, 1646
- If you own the four species, you do not have to lift all four.
- All know for what purpose a bride enters the bridal canopy. Yet against whomsoever speaks obscenely thereof, even if a sentence of seventy years happiness has been sealed for him, it is reversed for evil.
- Abraham served his guests three calf tongues with mustard, food ordinarily reserved for kings and ministers.
- "Hashesua" in Deuteronomy 14:7 (usually translated as "that are split through") refers to a specific animal called the Shesua, which has two backs and two spines.
