= Ibrahim I =

Ibrahim I may refer to:

- Ibrahim I ibn al-Aghlab (756–812), first emir of the Aghlabids in Ifriqiya
- Ibrahim I ibn Marzuban I (r. 957–979), King of Dvin and Azerbaijan
- İbrahim I of Karaman (fl. 1318–1343), bey of Karaman Beylik
- Ibrahim I of Shirvan (r. 1382–1418), Shah of Shirvan
- Ibrahim (Ottoman sultan) (1615–1648), Caliph and Sultan of the Ottoman Empire from 1640 until 1648

== See also ==
- Ibrahim II (disambiguation)
- Abraham I (disambiguation)
- Sultan Ibrahim (disambiguation)
