= Attestor =

Attestor may refer to:

- Someone who performs an attestation
- Attestor, a British investment firm that owns a majority stake in Condor (airline)
