= Abraham Path =

Cultural route

Route information
- Length: 1,078 km (670 mi)
- Existed: 2007–present

Major junctions
- From: Urfa
- To: Negev

The Abraham Path is a cultural route believed to have been the path of the patriarch Abraham's ancient journey across the Ancient Near East. The path was established in 2007 as a pilgrims' way to mimic the historical believed route of Abraham, between his birthplace of Ur of the Chaldees, believed by some to have been Urfa, Turkey, and his final destination of the desert of Negev.

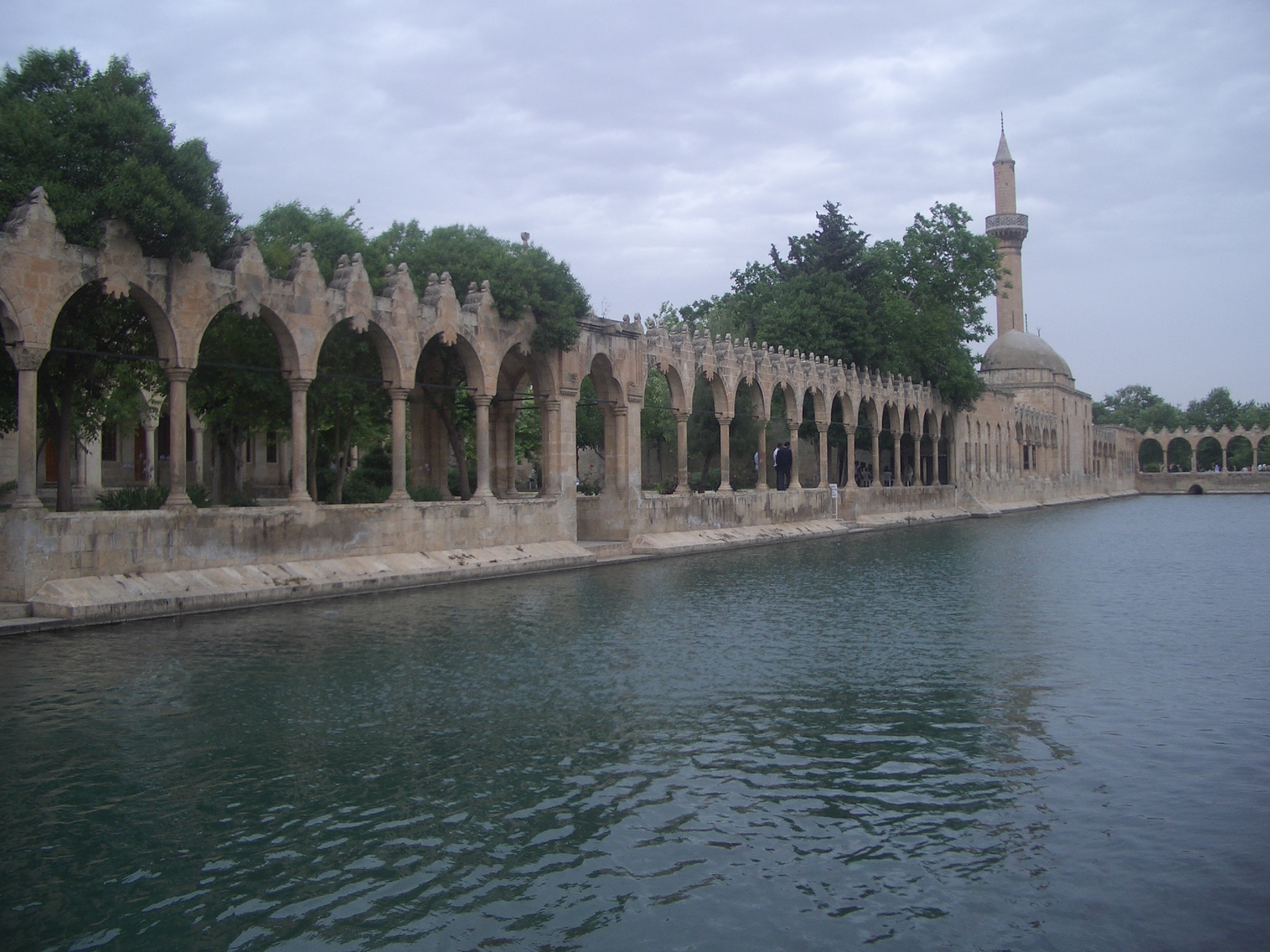
Urfa pond

== Abraham ==
Abraham/Ibrahim is believed to have lived in the Bronze Age. He traveled with family and flocks throughout the Fertile Crescent, the Arabian peninsula, and the Nile Valley. His story has inspired myriad communities including Kurds, Muslim, Jews, Christians, Alevi, Bedouin, Fellahin, Samaritans, and countless across the world. The Abraham Path Initiative aims to build on this narrative of shared connection with its rich tradition of walking and hospitality to strangers.

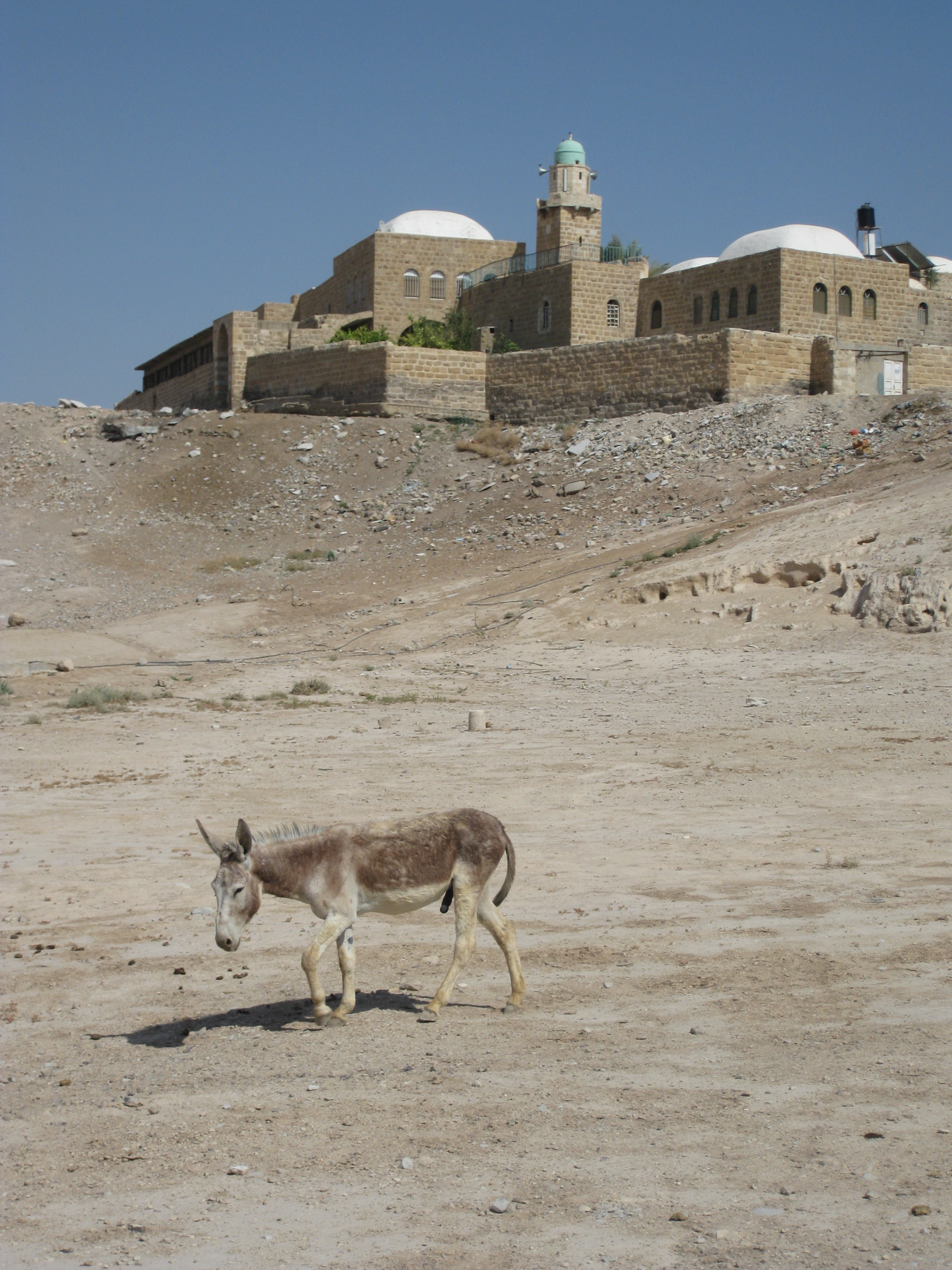
Nabi Musa

== Modern reconstruction ==
A reconstruction of the ancient path was created in 2007 by the Abraham Path Initiative, a registered 501(c)(3) nonprofit organization based in Cambridge, Massachusetts, United States, with a global network of partners. William Ury, negotiator and author of Getting to YES helped found the project at Harvard University's Program on Negotiation. Ury's TED Talk speaks about the beginnings of the path and the vision behind the initiative. Ury says that every culture has an origin-story, and that the origin-story of the Middle East is about how a man and his family walked the Middle East about four thousand years ago. The Abraham Path Initiative is endorsed by the United Nations World Tourism Organization, the United Nations Alliance of Civilizations and other international partners. The initiative is a non-profit, non-religious and non-political organization, whose mission is to support local partners in developing the Abraham Path as:

- a catalyst for socioeconomic development and sustainable tourism.
- a place of meeting and connection between people from the Middle East and people around the world.
- a creative space for stories that highlight the unique culture, heritage and hospitality of the region.

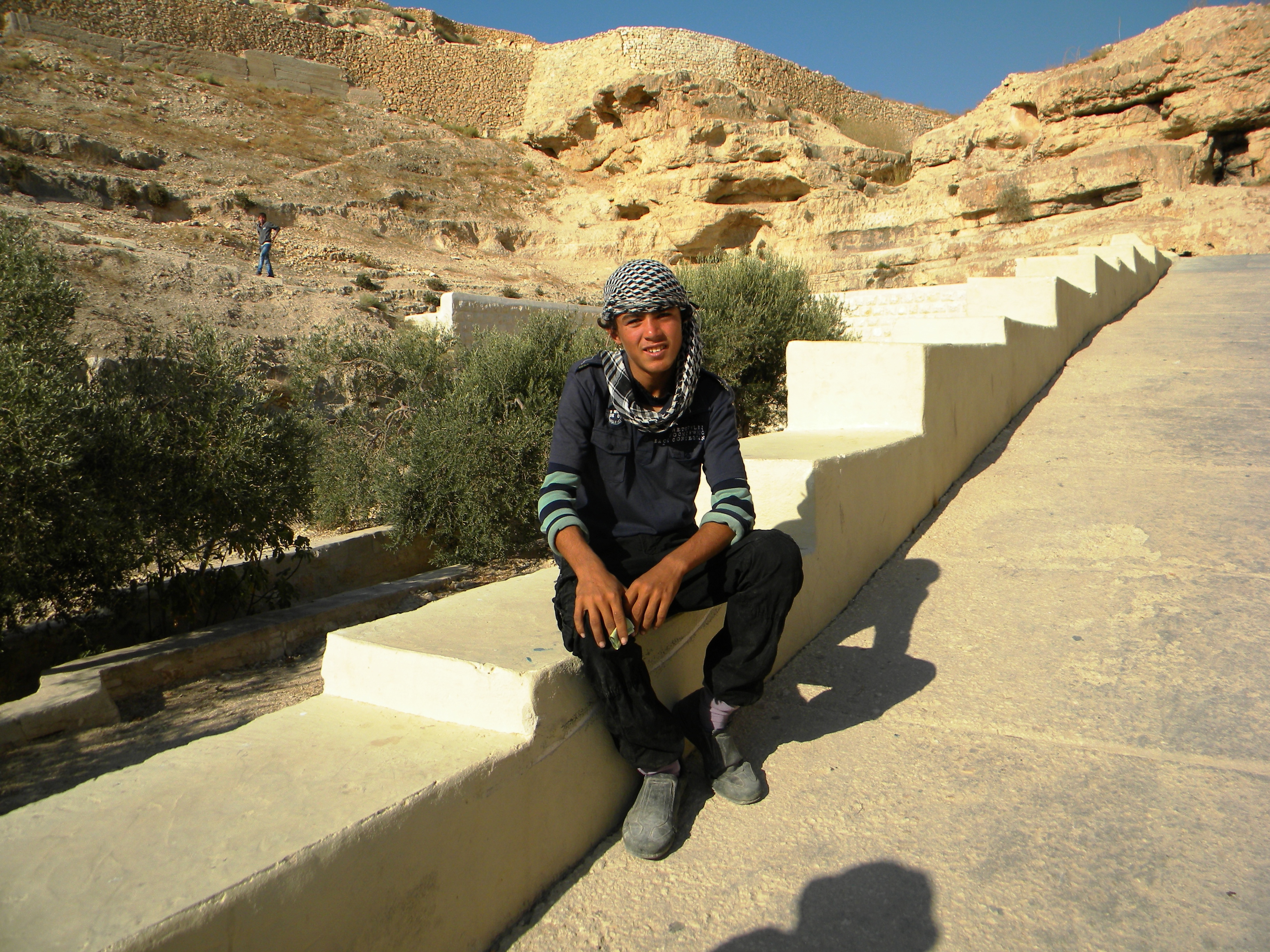
Mar Saba (Beduin youth)

== Overview of the current path ==
The main historical Abrahamic sites on the current path are Urfa, the birthplace of Abraham according to some Muslim traditions; Harran, according to the Hebrew Bible, a town Abraham lived in, and from which he received the call to start the main part of his journey; Jerusalem, the scene for the binding of Isaac upon the Foundation Stone, according to the Hebrew Bible; and Hebron, the location of the tomb of Abraham and his wife Sarah, according to Jewish, Christian and Muslim traditions.

== Major junctions ==
- Urfa
- Harran
- Nablus
- Jericho
- Jerusalem
- Bethlehem
- Hebron
- Negev

== See also ==
- List of long-distance footpaths
