= Ibrahim II =

Ibrahim II may refer to:

- Ibrahim Adil Shah II (1570–1627), sixth Sultan of Bijapur
- Ibrahim II of Ifriqiya (850–902), ninth Aghlabid emir of Ifriqiya
- Ibrahim II of Karaman (died 1464), Beg of Karaman
- Ibrahim II of Ramadan (died 1427), Beg of Ramadan
- Ibrahim II Sheykhshah (r. 1502–1524), Shah of Shirvan
- Ibrahim Khan II (r. 1689–1697), Subahdar of Bengal

== See also ==
- Ibrahim I (disambiguation)
- Abraham II (disambiguation)
