= Abraham Casting out Hagar and Ishmael =

Painting by Guercino

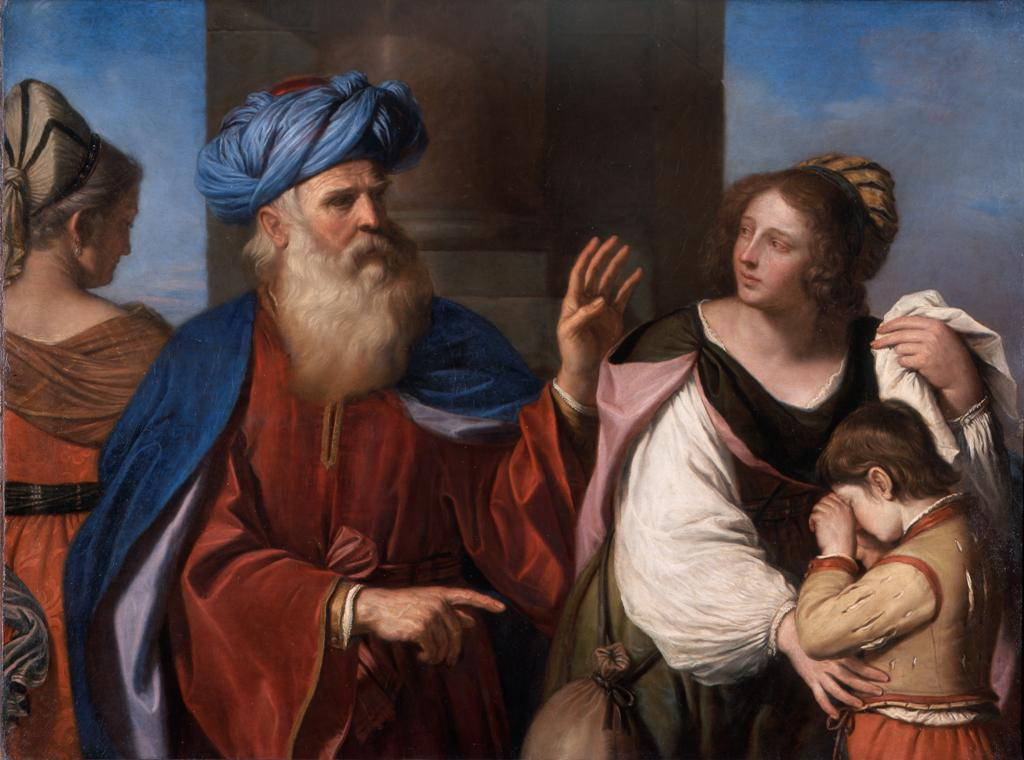
Abraham Casting out Hagar and Ishmael (1657) by Guercino

Abraham Casting out Hagar and Ishmael is a 1657 oil on canvas painting by Guercino, commissioned from him by the town of Cento to present to cardinal Lorenzo Imperiali, papal legate in Ferrara. It hangs now in the Pinacoteca di Brera in Milan.

== History and description ==
The subject of the painting was taken from the Book of Genesis. It depicts the episode of the expulsion of Hagar and her son Ishmael by Abraham. According to the Genesis, Hagar was the slave of Sarah, Abraham's wife, and when he was 86 years old, she asked him to sleep with Hagar so that she could conceive a son. Fourteen years later, Sarah gave birth to a son, Isaac, to Abraham, who was 100 years old. Sarah ordered Abraham to send Hagar and Ishmael away, which he did, after being assured by God that it was done in accordance with His will.

Guercino chose the moment when Abraham dismisses Hagar. All four characters are close to each other. Abraham is traditionally depicted with a beard and a turban. He is facing the slave. At her side hangs a travel pouch. Behind Abraham's back, with her back to the patriarch, is Sarah. She is responsible for the whole situation, but despite being turned away, she listens carefully to the conversation. On the opposite side is Ishmael crying, trying to protect himself in his mother's arms. Abraham seems to be torn apart. The gesture of the right hand strongly orders departure, but the left hand makes the sign of blessing.
