= Phicol =

Phicol, also spelled Phichol (KJV) or Phikol (Peshitta), from the Hebrew: פִיכֹל, meaning "great"; Latin: Phicol, was a military leader serving Abimelech, king of Gerar, according to the Hebrew Bible.

== Biblical narrative ==
Phicol was the chief captain of the army of Abimelech, the Canaanite king of Gerar.

He accompanied Abimelech at a meeting with Abraham in Genesis 21:22-24, when Abraham agreed to act honestly in his dealings with Abimelech and his descendants. He was also present when Abimelech entered into an alliance with Abraham with reference to a certain well which, from this circumstance, was called Beersheba, "the well of the oath" (Genesis 21:22,32). In a similar account in Genesis 26, he accompanied Abimelech in a meeting with Isaac, Abraham's son.

The Phicol mentioned in Genesis 26:26 is mentioned in relation to an agreement between Isaac and Abimelech, whereas the Phicol mentioned in Genesis 21:22, 32 is named in relation to an agreement between Abraham and Abimelech. Therefore, the name Phicol may be a namesake handed down through a generation or possibly even the name of a title (both are referred to as "commander of the army"), such as Abimelech.

Reference to "the land of the Philistines" in Genesis 21 is considered to be anachronistic, as the arrival of the Philistines in Canaan did not occur until the twelfth century BC.
