= Kahana bar Tahlifa =

Jewish Talmudist

Rav Kahana bar Taḥlifa (כהנא בר תחליפא) was a Jewish Talmudist who lived in Babylonia, known as an amora of the third century CE.

He is mentioned only twice in the Babylonian Talmud. In Menachot 66b he refutes R. Kahana, and in Eruvin 8b he quotes a teaching of R. Kahana b. Minyomi, who seems to have been his teacher.

Kahana b. Tahlifa apparently immigrated to the Land of Israel, perhaps in company with Rabbi Zeira; for Yerushalmi Avodah Zarah 2:9 mentions him together with Zeira and with Hanan b. Bo. This is not certain, however; for the passage reads: "R. Zeira, Kahana b. Taḥlifa, and Hanan b. Bo," which may be rendered also "R. Zeira Kahana" ("the priest"), since Zera was a priest. On this assumption, Bar Taḥlifa can not be identical with Kahana b. Taḥlifa.
