= Abraham II =

Abraham II may refer to:

- Abraham II of Seleucia-Ctesiphon, Patriarch of the Church of the East from 837 to 850
- Abraham II of Armenia, Catholicos of the Armenian Apostolic Church from 1730 to 1734
- Abraham II of Jerusalem, Armenian Orthodox Patriarch of Jerusalem from 885 to 909
- Abraham II of Jerusalem, Greek Orthodox Patriarch of Jerusalem from 1775 to 1787
- Abraham II (Coptic archbishop of Jerusalem), Coptic Orthodox Metropolitan Archbishop of Jerusalem from 1992 to 2015

== See also ==
- Ibrahim II (disambiguation)
- Abraham I (disambiguation)
- Abraham III (disambiguation)
