= Abraham I =

Abraham I may refer to:

- Abraham of Kashkar, a legendary primate of the Church of the East, 159–171 CE
- Abraham I of Jerusalem, the first Armenian Patriarch of Jerusalem, 638–669 CE
- Abraham I of Jerusalem, Greek Orthodox Patriarch of Jerusalem, 1468

== See also ==
- Ibrahim I (disambiguation)
- Abraham II (disambiguation)
- Abraham III (disambiguation)
