= David Lyle Jeffrey =

Medievalist and biblical scholar

FRSC David Lyle Jeffrey
- Born: June 28, 1941 (age 85)

Academic background
- Education: Wheaton College; Princeton University

Academic work
- Discipline: Literature and religion
- Institutions: Baylor University

David Lyle Jeffrey FRSC (born June 28, 1941) is a Canadian-American scholar of literature and religion, currently a Distinguished Senior Fellow at the Baylor Institute for Studies in Religion. He was elected a Fellow of the Royal Society of Canada in 1996. In 2003 he was given the Lifetime Achievement Award of the Conference of Christianity and Literature.

== Books ==
1. Modern Fiction and the Rebirth of Theology (Saratoga: S.U.N.Y. Press, 1973)
2. The Early English Lyric and Franciscan Spirituality (Lincoln, Nebraska: Nebraska University Press, 1975).
3. Editor and Co author, By Things Seen: Reference and Recognition in Medieval Thought (University of Ottawa Press, 1979).
4. Editor and Co author, Chaucer and Scriptural Tradition (University of Ottawa Press, 1984).
5. Toward a Perfect Love: The Spiritual Counsel of Walter Hilton (Portland, Oregon: Multnomah Press, 1986; new edition, Vancouver, Regent Press, 2002). (translation, with introduction and notes).
6. The Fiction of Jack Hodgins (Toronto: ECW Press, 1989).
7. English Spirituality in the Age of Wesley (Grand Rapids: Eerdmans, 1987). (edition of texts, critical study, introductions, notes). Second edition 1994; Third edition Vancouver: Regent Press, 2001; 2006. Available as A Burning and Shining Light through Logos Bible Software (2016--)
8. English Spirituality in the Age of Wyclif (Grand Rapids: Eerdmans, 1988). (translation of texts, critical study, introductions, notes) Second edition Vancouver: Regent Press, 2001; 2006.
9. Editor, with Brian J. Levy, The Anglo Norman Lyric (Toronto: Pontifical Institute of Mediaeval Studies, 1990; revised second edition by DLJ in 2006). (edition, translation, critical study).
10. General Editor and Co-Author, A Dictionary of Biblical Tradition in English Literature (Grand Rapids: Eerdmans, 1992).
11. People of the Book: Christian Identity and Literary Culture (Cambridge and Grand Rapids: Eerdmans, 1996). Chinese translation (2005), by Yi Li, Renmin University Press, Beijing (2004).
12. Editor and co-author, with Dominic Manganiello, Re-Thinking the Future of the University (University of Ottawa Press, 1998).
13. Houses of the Interpreter: Reading Scripture, Reading Culture (Waco, TX: Baylor University Press, 2003).
14. William Cowper: Selected Poetry and Prose, ed. David Lyle Jeffrey (Vancouver: Regent Press, 2006).
15. Editor, with C. Stephen Evans, co-author, The Bible and the University (Milton Keynes and Grand Rapids: Paternoster [UK] and Zondervan [US], 2007).
16. co-author ( 6 of 9 chs), with Gregory Maillet, Christianity and Literature: a Philosophical Perspective (Downers Grove: Inter-Varsity Press, 2010; 2017).
17. Editor, co-author, The King James Bible and the World it Made (Waco: Baylor University Press, 2011).
18. Luke: a Theological Commentary (Grand Rapids: Brazos Press, 2012).
19. A Dictionary of Biblical Tradition in English Literature, translated by Liu Guangyao et al. (Shanghai: Sanlian Academic Press, 2013). Revisions and corrections, plus a new introduction for the Chinese context. 3 vols.
20. In the Beauty of Holiness: Art and the Bible in Western Culture (Grand Rapids and Cambridge: Eerdmans, 2017).
21. Scripture and the English Poetic Imagination (Grand Rapids: Baker Academic, 2019).
22. Translations (San Jose: Resource Publications, 2021).
23. We Were a Peculiar People Once: Confessions of an Old-Time Baptist (Waco: 1845 Books, 2023).
24. A Testament of Witnesses and Other Poems (San Jose: Resource Publications, 2023).
25. Tales from Limerick Forest (Waco: 1845 Books, 2024).

== Bio-bibliographical ==
Transformations in Biblical Literary Traditions: Incarnation, Narrative and Ethics; essays in honor of David Lyle Jeffrey, eds. D. H. Williams and Phillip J. Donnelly (South Bend: Notre Dame University Press, 2014).
