= Amathlai =

Mother of Abraham, according to the Talmud

According to the Talmud, Amathlai (Mishnaic Hebrew: אֲמַתְלַאי ʾĂmaṯlaʾy) was the name of the mother of Abraham. According to this tradition, she was the daughter of a man named Karnebo, and the wife of Terah, the father of Abraham. The name of Abraham's mother is not mentioned in the Hebrew Bible. She does not appear during the story of Abraham's birth (Genesis 11:26), but is mentioned only when Abraham explains to Abimelech, king of Gerar, that Sarah is his sister on his father's side, but not on his mother's side (Genesis 20:12).

The Talmud relates that "Amathlai" was also the name of the mother of Haman.

== Name ==
How the Talmudic sages knew this name is unknown, but when they recorded it, they also gave the names of the mother of David, Samson, and Haman. Haman's mother is mentioned only because her name is also Amathlai, identical with the name of Abraham's mother. The sages claim that the reason they provided these names was to make this information available to those who engage in debate. This may have been a reference to debates that the Talmudic sages had with the early Christians who were their contemporaries.

Rashbam suggests an explanation of where the name was taken from:

For the mothers of Isaac and Jacob are mentioned, so we need to know the name of Abraham's mother... for with regard to all these women, heretics ask us what is the reason why we do not know their names... and they ask about these more than others for the reasons I explained above, and we answer them that they were handed down to us by the prophets orally.”

The name given by the Talmud is not the only one in Jewish tradition. The Book of Jubilees (11:13) names Abraham's mother Edna. Pirkei De-Rabbi Eliezer names her Atudai. There is probably no tradition going back to Moses about the name of Abraham's mother; her name could be Atudai, Edna, Amathlai, or another totally different one.
