= Sultan Ibrahim =

Sultan Ibrahim may refer to:

- Ibrahim of Ghazna (r. 1059–1099)
- Ibrahim I of the Maldives (r. 1398, 1412–20)
- Ibrahim of the Ottoman Empire (r. 1640–48)
- Ramathipadi I of Cambodia (r. 1642–1658)
- Sultan Ibrahim of Johor (r. 1895–1959)
- Ibrahim IV of Kelantan (r. 1944–1960)
- Ibrahim Ismail of Johor (born 1958)
- Nemipteridae fish
