= Abraham III =

Abraham III may refer to:

- Abraham III of Armenia (died 1737), Catholicos of the Armenian Apostolic Church
- Abraham III (Nestorian patriarch), first century Patriarch of the Church of the East

== See also ==
- Abraham I (disambiguation)
- Abraham II (disambiguation)
