= Attestation =

Bear witness, confirm or authenticate

An attestation is something that serves to bear witness, confirm, authenticate or verify the validity of some fact or status. An attestor is someone who performs an attestation. An attestation date is the date on which an attestation is performed.

== Examples ==
Examples of attestations include:

- Testimony, a sworn verification of the truth of a set of factual statements
- An attestation clause, verifying a document
- A police oath or an oath of allegiance in armed forces of the United Kingdom, pledging loyalty or the faithful execution of duties
- A validation of the integrity of a computing device such as a server needed for trusted computing

== See also ==
- The dictionary definition of attest at Wiktionary
- The dictionary definition of attestation at Wiktionary
- The dictionary definition of attestor at Wiktionary
- Attested language, a language for which documented evidence exists
