= As-Samad (name of God) =

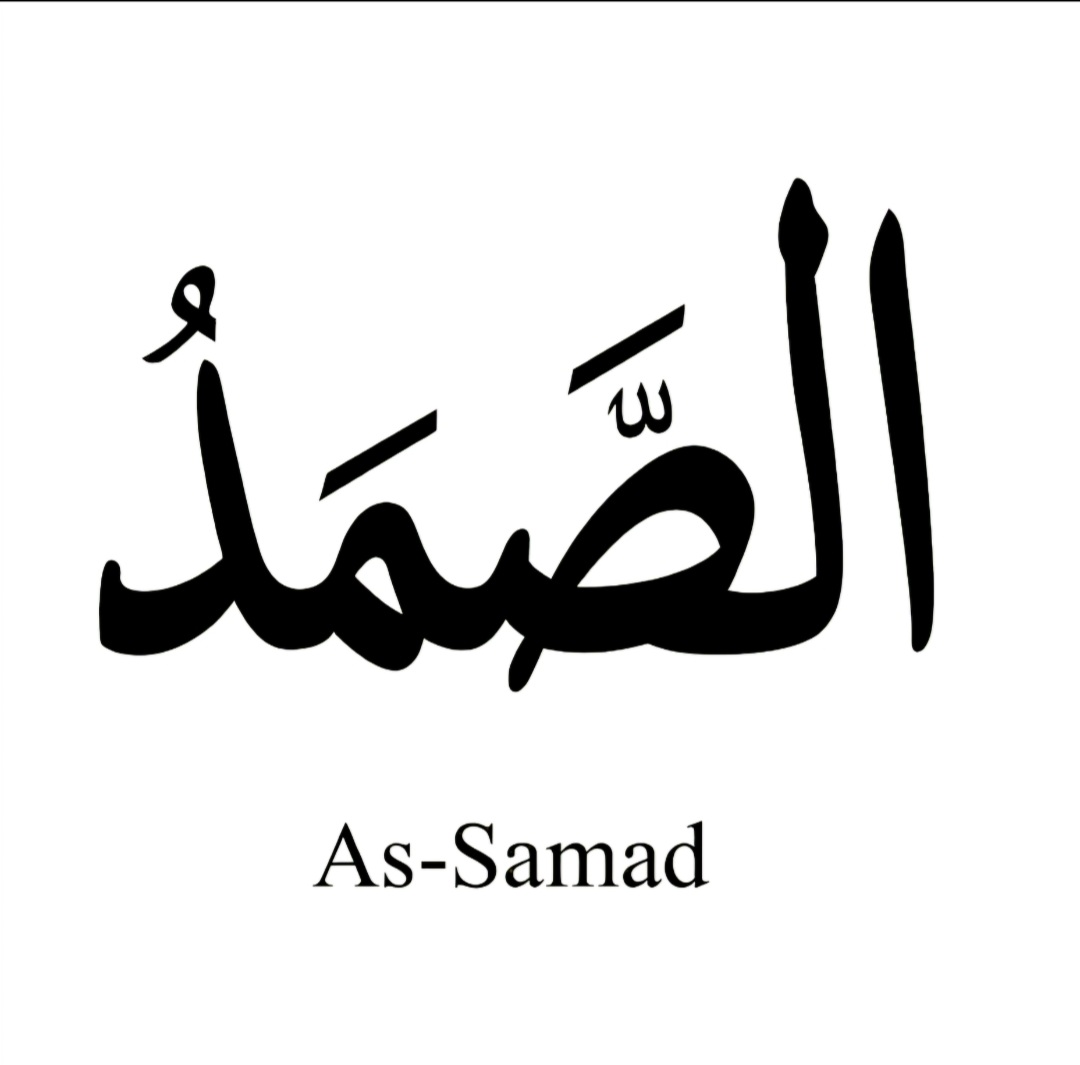
Allāh, The As-Samad, the Everlasting Sovereign of all

As-Samad (Arabic: ٱلصَّمَد) is one of the names of God in Islam, variously translated as The Eternal Refuge, The Self-Sufficient Sustainer, and The Everlasting Sovereign upon Whom all depend.

The name As-Samad appears in the Quran in Al-Ikhlas, one of the most best-known and frequently recited chapters of the Quran. The name conveys the meaning that Allah is the One to whom people turn in times of hardship, need, and distress and Muslims seek Allah's help, forgiveness, mercy, and provision, knowing that He alone can fulfill all needs and answer prayers.

Several Islamic scholars explained that the name refers to the Perfect Lord who possesses complete authority, knowledge, wisdom, power, and sovereignty, as God is free from all needs, deficiencies, and weaknesses, while all creatures are in need of God. In Islamic theology, as-Samad signifies that Allah is completely independent of all creation, while every created being depends upon Him for existence, sustenance, guidance, and assistance.

Ibn al-Qayyim considered the names Al-Ahad and As-Samad among the strongest candidates for Al-Ism al-A'zam. Imam Al-Ṭabarī recorded numerous early interpretations of As-Samad, including the explanation attributed to Ibn ʿAbbās that As-Samad is the Master who is perfect in His nobility, sovereignty, wisdom, and knowledge, and to whom all creation turns in need.

== The chapter of Oneness and supplication ==
As-Samad is considered one of the greatest names of God and it is mentioned in Surah Al-Ikhlas, a chapter regarded by Muslims as the most important summary of Islamic monotheism:

(قُلْ هُوَ اللَّهُ أَحَدٌ ۝ اللَّهُ الصَّمَدُ ۝ لَمْ يَلِدْ وَلَمْ يُولَدْ ۝ وَلَمْ يَكُن لَّهُ كُفُوًا أَحَدٌ) "Say: He is Allah, One. Allah, the Eternal Refuge. He neither begets nor is born. Nor is there to Him any equivalent." — Quran 112:1-4 Because of its emphasis on the oneness and perfection of God, Surah Al-Ikhlas is highly valued in Islamic tradition and is often memorized by Muslim children and adults.

It was narrated by Abdullah bin Buraidah that his father said:

(اللَّهُمَّ إِنِّي أَسْأَلُكَ بِأَنَّكَ أَنْتَ اللَّهُ الْأَحَدُ الصَّمَدُ الَّذِي لَمْ يَلِدْ وَلَمْ يُولَدْ وَلَمْ يَكُنْ لَهُ كُفُوًا أَحَدٌ)

"O Allah, I ask You because You are Allah, the One (Al-Ahad), As-Samad, Who neither begets nor is begotten, and there is none comparable to Him." After hearing this supplication, the Prophet ﷺ said: "He has asked Allah by His Greatest Name, which if He is asked by it, He gives, and if He is called upon by it, He answers.

— Chapter: The Greatest Name Of Allah, Ibn Majah 3857]
