= Q113 =

- Quran 113, "The Daybreak", (al-falaq)
- Q113, New York bus route
