= Four Quls =

Islamic prayer

Four Quls (Arabic: القَلاقِل; Persian: چهار قل, romanized: Chahar Qul) are considered to be four Qur'anic suras, al-Kafirun, al-Ikhlas, al-Falaq, and al-Nas, all of which are begun with the word "qul" (which means, "say").

They are also referred to as Suwar Qul and Dhat al-Qalaqil. According to a hadith from the Prophet of Islam, known as the Hadith of Dhat al-Qalaqil, the recitation of the Four Quls is recommended for protection against disasters.

The Four Quls are considered as four suras of the Qur'an that begin with the imperative verb, "qul", which means "say".

== Suras ==
The mentioned suras (numbers 109, 112, 113, and 114, respectively) and their opening verses are as follows:

- Al-Kafirun (Sura 109): begins with "Say, O disbelievers"
- Al-Ikhlas (Sura 112): begins with "Say, He is Allah, [Who is] One, Allah, the Everlasting Self-Sufficient Master of all"
- Al-Falaq (Sura 113): begins with "Say, I seek refuge in the Lord of daybreak"
- Al-Nas (Sura 114): begins with "Say, I seek refuge in the Lord of mankind"
