= Al-Ism al-A'zam =

Greatest name of Allah

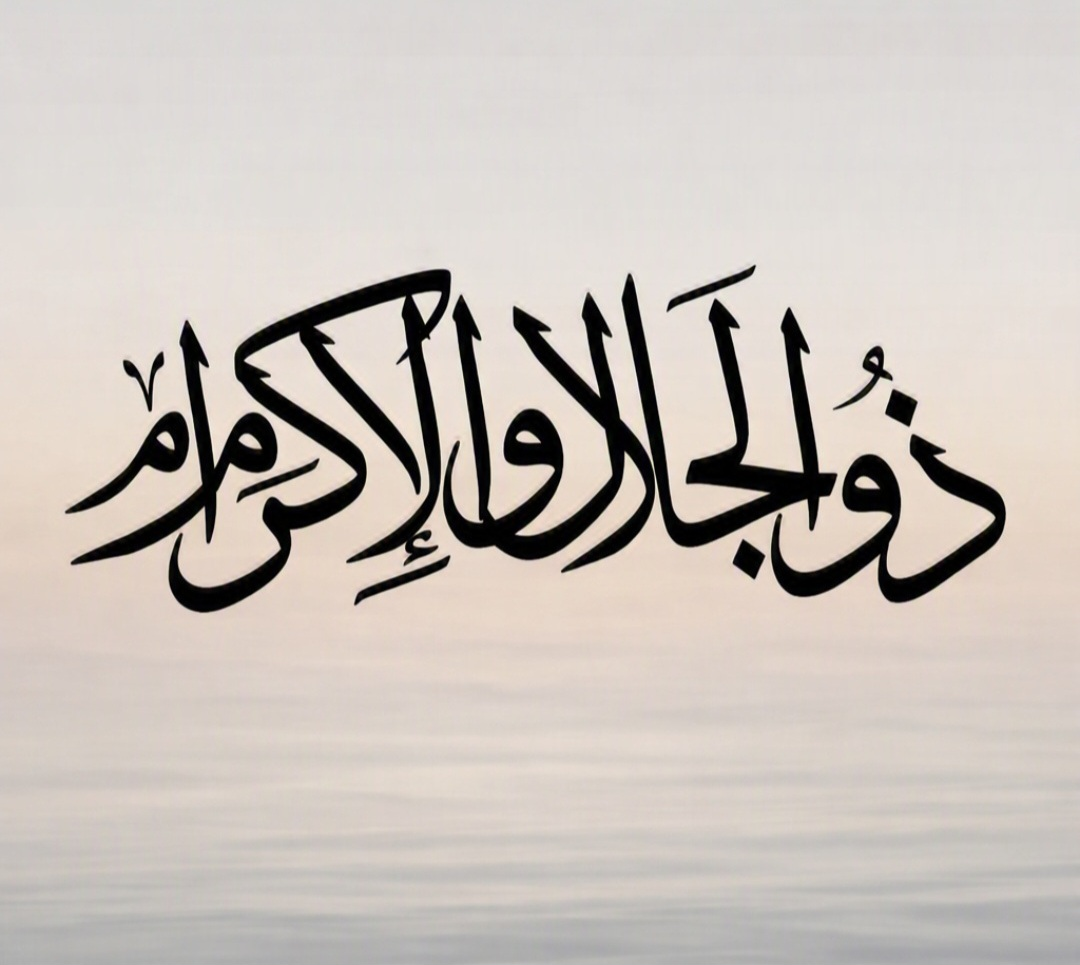
Zul Jalali wal Ikram, Owner of Majesty and Honor

Al-Ḥayy, The Ever-Living

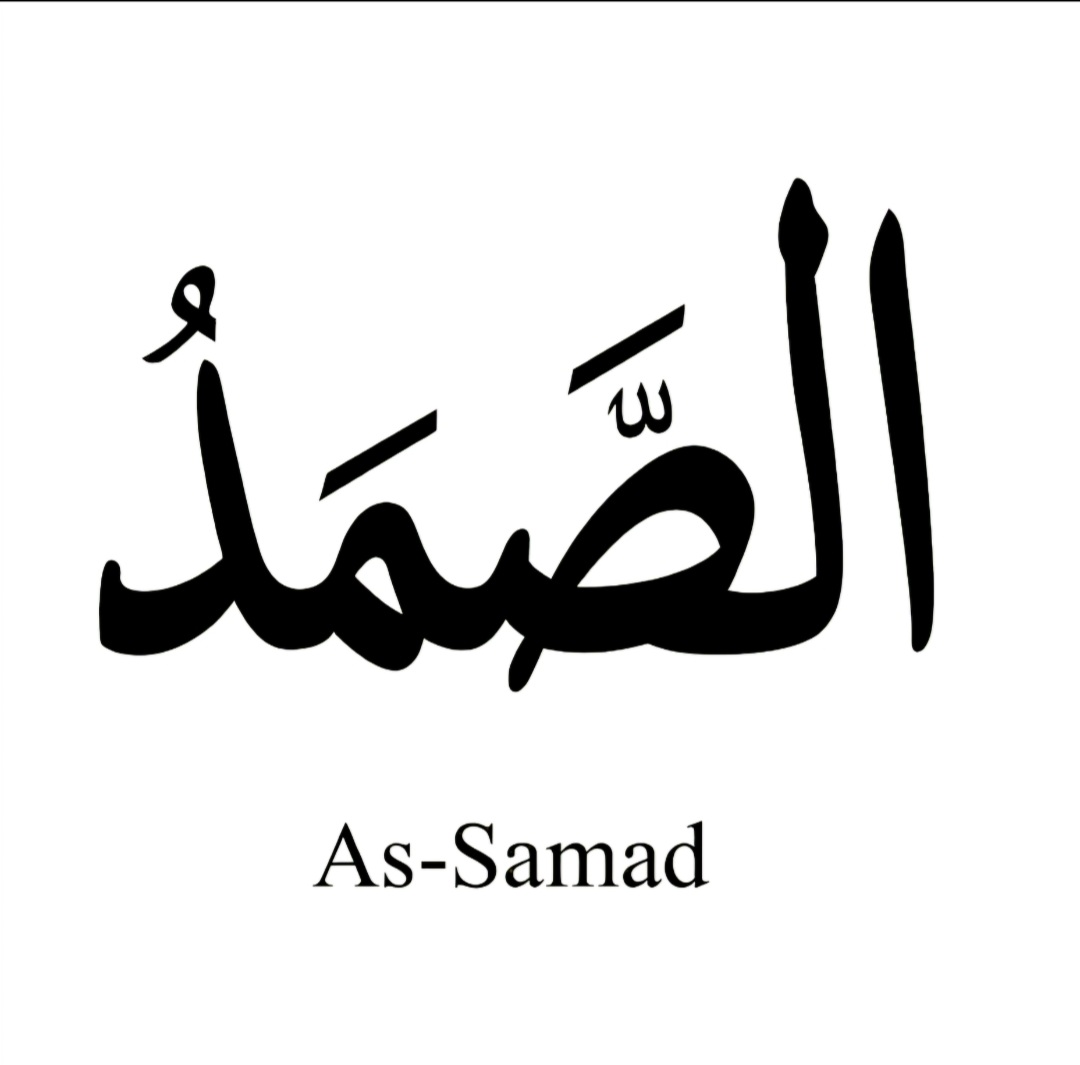
As-Samad, The Everlasting Sovereign and Refuge

Al-Ism al-Aʿẓam (Arabic: الاسم الأعظم), literally "the Greatest Name", also known as Ism Allah al-Akbar (اسم الله الأکبر, 'the Greatest Name of Allah'), refers in Islam to the greatest names of Allah, which include Al-Ḥayy, Al-Qayyūm, Zul Jalali wal Ikram, Al-Ahad, As-Samad.

== Hadith ==
Narrated Anas ibn Malik:

I was sitting with the Messenger of Allah (ﷺ) and a man was offering prayer. He then made supplication: O Allah, I ask Thee by virtue of the fact that praise is due to Thee, there is no deity but Thou, Who showest favour and beneficence, the Originator of the Heavens and the earth, O Lord of Majesty and Splendour (Ya Dhul Jalāli wal Ikrām), O Living One (Ya Hayu), O Eternal One (Ya Qayyūm).

The Prophet (ﷺ) then said: He has supplicated Allah using His Greatest Name, when supplicated by this name, He answers, and when asked by this name He gives.

— Abu Dawood 1495 (Sahih: Albani)

== Significance ==
According to some Islamic hadiths, whoever calls to God using al-Ism al-A'zam, their prayer (du'a) will be granted.

In Shi'a Islam, al-Ism al-A'zam is believed to have a powerful effect in the act of blessing.

== See also ==
- God in Islam
- Hashem, Hebrew for "the Name", a name of God in Judaism
- Names of God in Islam
