= 2025 Nagpur violence =

Violence in Nagpur

- Date: 17 March 2025
- Location: Nagpur, Maharashtra, India; 21°8′42.51″N 79°6′14″E

Casualties
- Death: 1
- Injuries: 30+
- Arrested: 105+

On 17 March 2025, communal violence erupted in Nagpur, Maharashtra, India, following demands by right-wing Hindu organizations to remove the tomb of the Mughal emperor Aurangzeb. The unrest began after members of the Vishva Hindu Parishad and Bajrang Dal staged a protest, during which they burned an effigy of Aurangzeb and chanted slogans calling for the tomb's removal.

The situation escalated after a ‘chadar’ with Quranic inscriptions was allegedly burned during the demonstration. The VHP, police and media reports characterized it as a rumour, which local Muslims denied. This was followed by several members of Muslim groups marching near the Mahal area and allegedly throwing stones at the police. A local resident told ANI that the masked attackers carried sharp weapons and bottles.

== Background ==
The violence occurred against the backdrop of rising political and social tensions surrounding Aurangzeb's legacy. The Mughal emperor has remained a controversial figure in Indian history, with some groups viewing him as a symbol of oppression and others defending his rule. Additionally, his Muslim status makes him even more unpopular among right-wing Hindu organizations. The debate intensified following the release of the Bollywood film Chhaava, which portrayed the death of Maratha ruler Sambhaji, who was executed by Aurangzeb. The film's depiction of historical events reignited discussions about the Mughal emperor's actions, contributing to heightened tensions. The movie has been criticized for its historical inaccuracies and a historian has also been allegedly threatened for pointing out those inaccuracies.

In the weeks leading up to the violence, organizations such as the Vishva Hindu Parishad (VHP) and Bajrang Dal intensified their campaign to have Aurangzeb's tomb in Aurangabad removed. These groups argued that the tomb glorified a ruler they claimed had oppressed Hindu communities. Political rhetoric further escalated when local politician Abu Azmi defended Aurangzeb's reign, fueling anger among right-wing Hindu organizations.

== Protests ==
On 17 March 2025, members of right-wing Hindu organizations VHP and Bajrang Dal staged a protest near the Chhatrapati Shivaji Maharaj statue in Mahal area of Nagpur, where they burned an effigy of Aurangzeb and raised slogans calling for the removal of his tomb. During the agitation, The situation escalated after reports emerged that a ‘chadar’ with Quranic inscriptions had been burned during the demonstration. The police and media characterized as rumors, which local Muslims denied. The news of the ‘chadar’ burning quickly spread, sparking protests and mobilizing groups on both sides.

This led to violent clashes in the Chitnis Park, Hansapuri, and Mahal areas of Nagpur. A large mob of nearly 1,000 people gathered and threw stones and firebombs, injuring police and damaging multiple properties and homes. A clinic in Hansapuri was damaged, and multiple businesses were targeted amid the unrest. Over 60 vehicles were vandalised and torched, including 36 cars, 22 two-wheelers, and a crane

The Maharashtra Police have stated that no cloth bearing religious text was burned during the right-wing agitation and have issued notices to social media accounts to facilitate the immediate removal of content spreading such claims. According to a release by the Maharashtra Cyber Cell, the identified social media accounts promoting these rumors were allegedly intended to hurt the sentiments of a particular religious group, incite communal unrest, and further escalate the ongoing law and order situation in the state.

However, according to Alt News, a fact-checking organization, video evidence analyzed by them indicates that a chadar or cloth inscribed with Islamic religious text specifically the four Quls from the Quran was desecrated and burned alongside an image of Aurangzeb during demonstrations conducted by the Vishva Hindu Parishad and Bajrang Dal.

== Response ==
A curfew was imposed in the affected areas, and a ban on large gatherings was enforced to prevent further escalation and 65 people including three minors were arrested.

Local Muslim residents accused the police of siding with VHP and Bajrang Dal members, who allegedly burned a Dargah chadar inscribed with Quranic verses during a protest demanding Aurangzeb's tomb demolition. Residents claimed the police ignored their complaint, leading to a protest at Nagpur's Mahal area.

According to the report, VHP and Bajrang Dal members later marched through Muslim-majority areas chanting provocative slogans, triggering clashes. Eyewitnesses accused the police of arriving late and detaining innocent Muslim residents during late-night raids. An FIR filed at the Ganesh Peth Police Station named 52 Muslim men, and six FIRs were registered against several individuals.

On 18 March 2025, a key accused according to the local police in the matter, Fahim Shamim Khan a worker of the local Minorities Democratic Party (MDP), was arrested by the police. After the arrest of Khan MDP party leader Alim Patel said “Everyone in the country has the right to protest. The Constitution allows you to burn the effigy of Aurangzeb and we do not have a problem with that. But why desecrate holy verses? Fahim along with a delegation of our workers went there to request action against those involved in the desecration. We are shocked that the police have booked and arrested him instead of taking action against the perpetrators.” Fahim Shamim Khan, the alleged key accused in the Nagpur violence, and five others were booked on charges of sedition and spreading misinformation on social media. Fahim was also charged with UAPA Police claim that Khan's inflammatory social media posts triggered the unrest. Second alleged mastermind Syed Asim was also identified by the police.

== Reactions ==
Speaking in the Maharashtra Assembly, Chief Minister Devendra Fadnavis addressed the violence in Nagpur, stating, "In Nagpur, Vishwa Hindu Parishad and Bajrang Dal held protests. Rumours were spread that things containing religious content were burnt....It looks like a well-planned attack. No one has permission to take law and order into their hands." He further assured, "Attacks on police will not be tolerated, strict action will be taken."

Fadnavis also said that no evidence of foreign involvement or any Bangladeshi link had surfaced so far. “However, a connection to Malegaon can be seen in the violence, as one of the accused is affiliated with a political party from Malegaon and was reportedly seen aiding the rioters,” he said, without naming Minority Democratic Party leader Fahim Shamim Khan, who has been arrested on charges of sedition.

Deputy Chief Minister Eknath Shinde also described the violence as a "planned conspiracy." He remarked, "Such kind of a brutal incident was never witnessed before. The protestors are protesting for the pride of Chhatrapati Sambhaji Maharaj... Those who support Aurangzeb should read history and watch the movie 'Chhava'... I believe that even the true patriotic Muslims will not support Aurangzeb."

Maulana Shahabuddin Razvi, wrote to Union home minister Amit Shah, seeking a ban on the film 'Chhava', alleging it was inciting communal tensions and was directly responsible for the Nagpur violence.

Shiv Sena (UBT) chief Uddhav Thackeray criticized the Maharashtra government, comprising the Bharatiya Janata Party, Eknath Shinde-led Shiv Sena, and Ajit Pawar's NCP. Referring to the violence, Thackeray stated, "I am not the Chief Minister, nor am I the Home Minister. Ask the Chief Minister (Devendra Fadnavis) who is behind this. Because the RSS headquarters is there (Nagpur). There is a double-engine government here (in Maharashtra). If the double-engine government has failed, then they should resign."

Meanwhile, Congress leader Renuka Chowdhury submitted a suspension notice in the Rajya Sabha, calling for a discussion on what she described as a "complete breakdown of communal harmony and law and order" in Nagpur. "That this house do suspend zero hour and relevant rules relating Question Hour and other scheduled business to deliberate on the complete breakdown of communal harmony and law and order in Nagpur, Maharashtra. In its 300 years of dynamic existence, Nagpur has never experienced riots," her notice read.

Shiv Sena (UBT) leader Priyanka Chaturvedi also targeted the Maharashtra government, alleging that the state was being destabilized. "Instigating violence, creating instability in the state, keeping the citizens busy over past history while getting away with tough questions on the state’s financial doom, increased debt burden, growing joblessness and farmer suicides. Maharashtra is being strategically led towards making the state unattractive for investment. It is to help the neighbouring state to take advantage," she claimed.

The Rashtriya Swayamsevak Sangh also responded to the incident, stating that "No type of violence is good for society, and Aurangzeb is not relevant today."

Uttar Pradesh Chief Minister Yogi Adityanath said that "no invader should be glorified. Doing so is laying the foundation of treason, which independent India cannot tolerate."

== Aftermath ==
Over 30 people, including several police officers, sustained injuries during the violence.

On 24 March 2025, The house of the alleged key accused was demolished allegedly in violation of the Supreme Court order on Bulldozer Justice.

On 15 April 2025, the Nagpur civic chief tendered an unconditional apology in court for demolishing the house of the alleged key accused. The civic chief stated that he was unaware of the measures the Supreme Court order put in place to curb bulldozer justice.

On 14 February 2026 The court asked Nagpur Municipal Corporation whether it would rebuild the house of Fahim Khan or pay compensation. The court adjourned the hearing to 4 March 2026.

Alisha Khan the wife of Fahim Khan was elected as a corporator in Nagpur Municipal Corporation in January 2026.

Eight members of right-wing Hindutva organization VHP, Bajrang Dal surrendered, Following their surrender, the police arrested them and produced them before the court, which granted them bail.

Amidst the demands from right-wing organizations that Mughal Emperor Aurangzeb's tomb at Khultabad in Maharashtra's Sambhajinagar district be removed, the Archaeological Survey of India (ASI) has put up tin sheets on two sides of the 18th century structure, a circular fence will also be installed around the tomb.

During the investigation, the probe team determined a link towards illegal Bangladeshi immigrants, as a few social media posts traced by the officials were found to be in Bengali language.

== See also ==
- Hindutva
- Violence against Muslims in independent India
- Communal violence
- Religious violence in India
