= Ahmadjon Postindoz Madrasa =

Madrasa in Bukhara, Uzbekistan

The Ahmadjon Postindoz Madrasa (Uzbek: Ahmadjon Poʻstindoʻz madrasasi) was a madrasa located in Bukhara Region. It no longer exists today. Ahmadjon Postindoz Madrasa was built in the Asiriy neighborhood, during the reign of Amir Nasrulloxon (1826-1860) of the Emirate of Bukhara, by Domulla Ahmadjon, son of mulla Avazjon. This madrasa was built in 1705. The scholar Abdusattor Jumanazarov studied a number of endowment documents related to this madrasa and provided information about it. In front of this madrasa, Domulla Ahmadjon also built a school of baked brick, wood and plaster. Domulla Ahmadjon endowed 363 plots of land in the north river district of Bukhara, a bathhouse in Chorbogi Oliya, and three shops in the Asiriy neighborhood, to ensure the functioning of the madrasa and the school. In this madrasa, every Friday, the imam and the school teacher recited the "Ikhlas" sura three times and dedicated the reward to the founder’s soul. Ahmadjon Postindoz Madrasa housed two students in each room. The endowment property was not rented out to tenants for more than three years. Many teachers taught at Ahmadjon Postindoz Madrasa. According to other endowment documents, 306 plots of land were endowed for this madrasa by Ahmadjon, son of Avazbadal, in 1858-1858. Information about the students and teachers who studied at this madrasa has also been preserved. Sadri Ziyo wrote that Ahmadjon Postindoz Madrasa had ten rooms. Ahmadjon Postindoz Madrasa consisted of nine rooms and one classroom, a winter mosque and a summer veranda. The madrasa was made of baked brick, wood, stone and plaster.
