= Q112 =

Q112 may refer to:

- Quran 112, "The Declaration of God's Unity" (al-ikhlas)
- Q112, New York bus route
