= Al-Ḥayy =

Name of God in Islam

Al-Ḥayy, written in Arabic

Al-Ḥayy or Ḥayy (Arabic: الحي) is one of the greatest names of God in Islam, meaning The Ever Living. Al-Hayy is all-seeing, all-hearing, and all-powerful, without experiencing drowsiness or fatigue. This name also alludes to the idea that all creatures—angels, humans, jinn, and animals—receive life from God in the Islamic worldview. Additionally, God imparts life to the hearts of humans through his speech (the Quran).

The Prophet once asked Ubayy ibn Ka'b to identify the greatest verse in the Quran. The companion answered by saying Ayat Al-Kursi, and the prophet praised him for recognizing it.

== Ayat Al-Kursi (the Verse of the Throne) ==
Al-Hayy is considered one of the greatest names of God, as it is mentioned in the Throne Verse (Ayat Al-Kursi) of Surah al-Baqarah, considered by many Muslims the greatest verse of the Quran, with Muslim children and youth memorizing this verse:

(اللَّهُ لَا إِلَهَ إِلَّا هُوَ الْحَيُّ الْقَيُّومُ لَا تَأْخُذُهُ سِنَةٌ وَلَا نَوْمٌ لَهُ مَا فِي السَّمَاوَاتِ وَمَا فِي الْأَرْضِ مَنْ ذَا الَّذِي يَشْفَعُ عِنْدَهُ إِلَّا بِإِذْنِهِ يَعْلَمُ مَا بَيْنَ أَيْدِيهِمْ وَمَا خَلْفَهُمْ وَلَا يُحِيطُونَ بِشَيْءٍ مِنْ عِلْمِهِ إِلَّا بِمَا شَاءَ وَسِعَ كُرْسِيُّهُ السَّمَاوَاتِ وَالْأَرْضَ وَلاَ يَؤُودُهُ حِفْظُهُمَا وَهُوَ الْعَلِيُّ الْعَظِيمُ)

Allah - there is no deity except Him, the Ever-Living, the Sustainer of [all] existence. Neither drowsiness overtakes Him nor sleep. To Him belongs whatever is in the heavens and whatever is on the earth. Who is it that can intercede with Him except by His permission? He knows what is [presently] before them and what will be after them, and they encompass not a thing of His knowledge except for what He wills. His Kursi (throne) extends over the heavens and the earth, and their preservation tires Him not. And He is the Most High, the Most Great.

— Verse 255, Chapter 2, The Quran [Sahih International]

== See also ==
- Hayyi Rabbi, name of God in Mandaeism
- Chai (symbol), a word for "life" in Hebrew, a relative in the same linguistic family as Arabic
