= Dhul Jalāli wal Ikrām =

Name of God in Islam

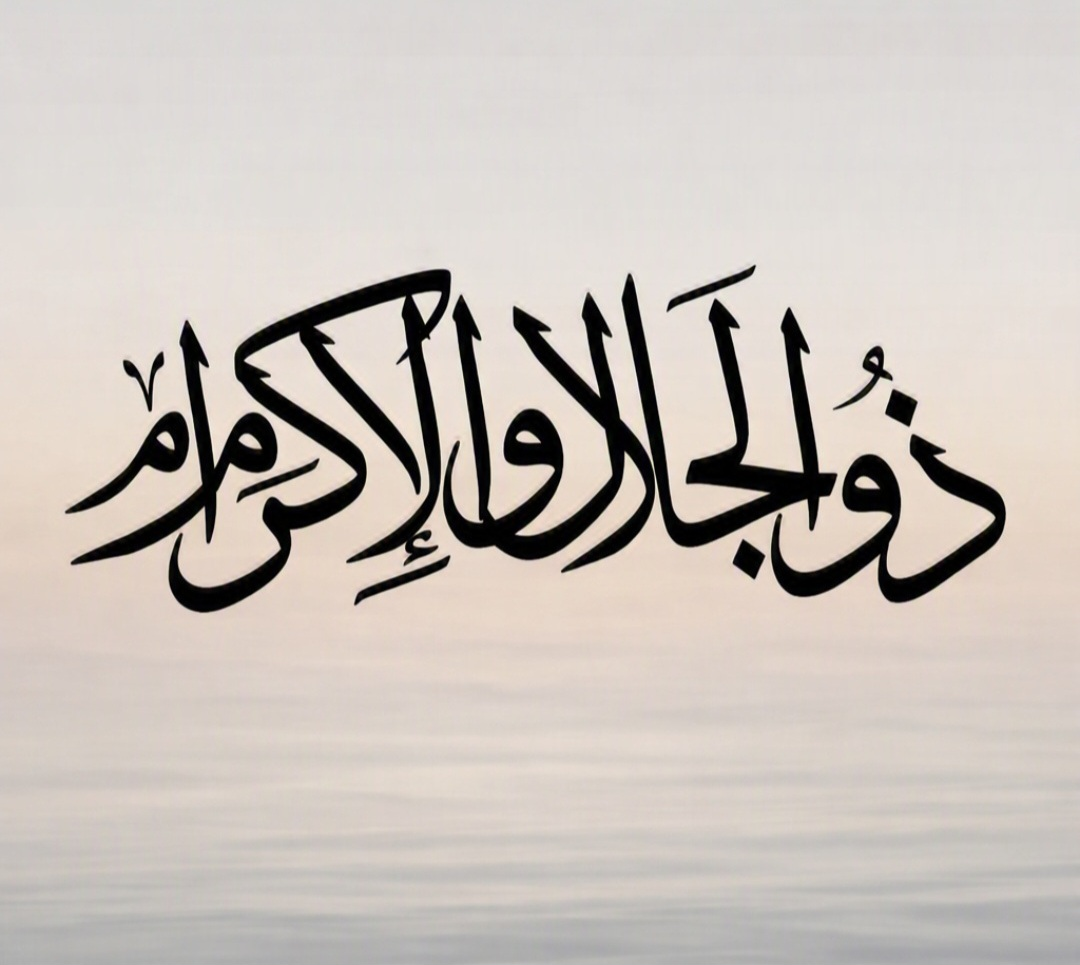
The Possessor of Majesty and Honor, one of the greatest name of Allah.

Ḏhū l-Jalāli wa-l-ʾIkrām (Arabic: ذُو ٱلْجَلَالِ وَٱلْإِكْرَامِ), also spelled Zal Jalali wal Ikrom, meaning The Possessor of Majesty and Honour, is one of the names of Allah in Islamic tradition. It is widely regarded by classical scholars and hadith literature as one of the greatest (Al-Ism al-A'zam) and most comprehensive names of God.

The name, mentioned in Quran in surah Ar-Rahman, combines the two concepts of Majesty or Grandeur and Honour, expressing Allah’s infinite sovereignty and beneficence.

Scholars such as Imam Bayhaqi mentions that the term The Glorious face of Allah, is an attribute of Allah, rather than form or image. Similarly, Ibn Kathīr, explains the Face of your Lord as referring to Allah’s Essence, everlasting and unperishing.

According to Scottish historian W. Montgomery Watt, the Dhul Jalāli wal Ikrām epithet conveys a fusion of God’s supremacy with the moral principles articulated in Divine command theory. He further explains that the name functions as a literary and theological doctrine that emphasises God’s exaltedness and greatness in contrast to human frailty.

== Qu'ranic verse ==
The verse in Quran states:

In these [gardens] will be [all] things most excellent and beautiful. Which, then, of your Sustainer's powers can you disavow? [There the blest will live with their] companions pure and modest, in pavillions [splendid] -which, then, of your Sustainer's powers can you disavow? -[companions] whom neither man nor invisible being will have touched ere then. Which, then, of your Sustainer's powers can you disavow?[In such a paradise will they dwell,] reclining upon meadows green and carpets rich in beauty. Which, then, of your Sustainer's powers can you disavow? Hallowed be thy Sustainer's name, full of majesty and glory!

The verse in Surah Ar-Rahman concludes by praising God as the One whose majesty and honour are in absolute perfection. After describing the beauty and peace of paradise, the final line reminds the reader that all these blessings come from God’s greatness and His endless generosity. It highlights that every favour mentioned in the passage reflects His supreme glory and noble kindness.

== Reported virtues and supplications ==
Aisha (ra) reported: When the Messenger of Allah ﷺ pronounced salutation, his salutation took longer than it took him to say:

(اللَّهُمَّ أَنْتَ السَّلاَمُ وَمِنْكَ السَّلاَمُ تَبَارَكْتَ ذَا الْجَلاَلِ وَالإِكْرَامِ)

O Allah: Thou art Peace, and peace comes from Thee, blessed art Thou, Possessor of Glory and Honour

— Sahih Muslim 592

On another hadith, Anas ibn Malik narrated: "I was sitting with the Messenger of Allah ﷺ and a man was offering prayer. He then made supplication"

(اللَّهُمَّ إِنِّي أَسْأَلُكَ بِأَنَّ لَكَ الْحَمْدَ لاَ إِلَهَ إِلاَّ أَنْتَ الْمَنَّانُ بَدِيعُ السَّمَوَاتِ وَالأَرْضِ يَا ذَا الْجَلاَلِ وَالإِكْرَامِ يَا حَىُّ يَا قَيُّومُ)

O Allāh, I ask Thee by virtue of the fact that praise is due to Thee, there is no deity but Thou, Who showest favour and beneficence, the Originator of the heavens and the earth, O Lord of Majesty and Splendour, O Living One, O Eternal One

— Sunan Abi Dawud, 1495
