= Al-Ikhlas =

112th chapter of the Quran

Surah 112 of the Quran
ٱلإخْلَاص Al-Ikhlāṣ Sincerity
- Qira'ah; English text
- Classification: Meccan
- Alternate titles (Ar.): At-Tawḥīd
- Other names: Absoluteness, The Unity, Oneness of God, Sincere Religion, The Declaration of [God's] Perfection
- Position: Juzʼ 30
- No. of verses: 4
- No. of words: 15
- No. of letters: 47

Al-Ikhlāṣ (Arabic: الْإِخْلَاص, "Sincerity"), also known as the Declaration of God's Unity and al-Tawḥid (Arabic: التوحيد, "Monotheism"), is the 112th chapter (sūrah) of the Quran, which summarises the fundamental principles of Islam by affirming God’s absolute oneness, everlasting sovereignty and unparalleled essence. The chapter is generally heralded to be equal of one third of the Quran in terms of its core meaning.

According to George Sale, this chapter is held in particular veneration by Muslims, and declared, by Islamic tradition. It is said to have been revealed during the Quraysh's conflict with Muhammad; in answer to a challenge over the distinguishing attributes of God, Muhammad invited them to worship.

Al-Ikhlas is not merely the name of this surah but also the title of its contents, for it deals exclusively with Tawhid and has been often called the perfect ontological definition of God. The other surahs of the Quran generally have been designated after a word occurring in them, but in this surah the word Ikhlaṣ has occurred nowhere. It has been given this name in view of its meaning and subject matter.

According to al-Razi, the name Al-Ahad signifies God’s absolute indivisibility rather than numerical oneness, while the name As‑Samad as the Marker and Sustainer of the entire existence.

== Text and meaning ==
Al-Ikhlas
Recitation of Al-Ikhlas in mujawwad.

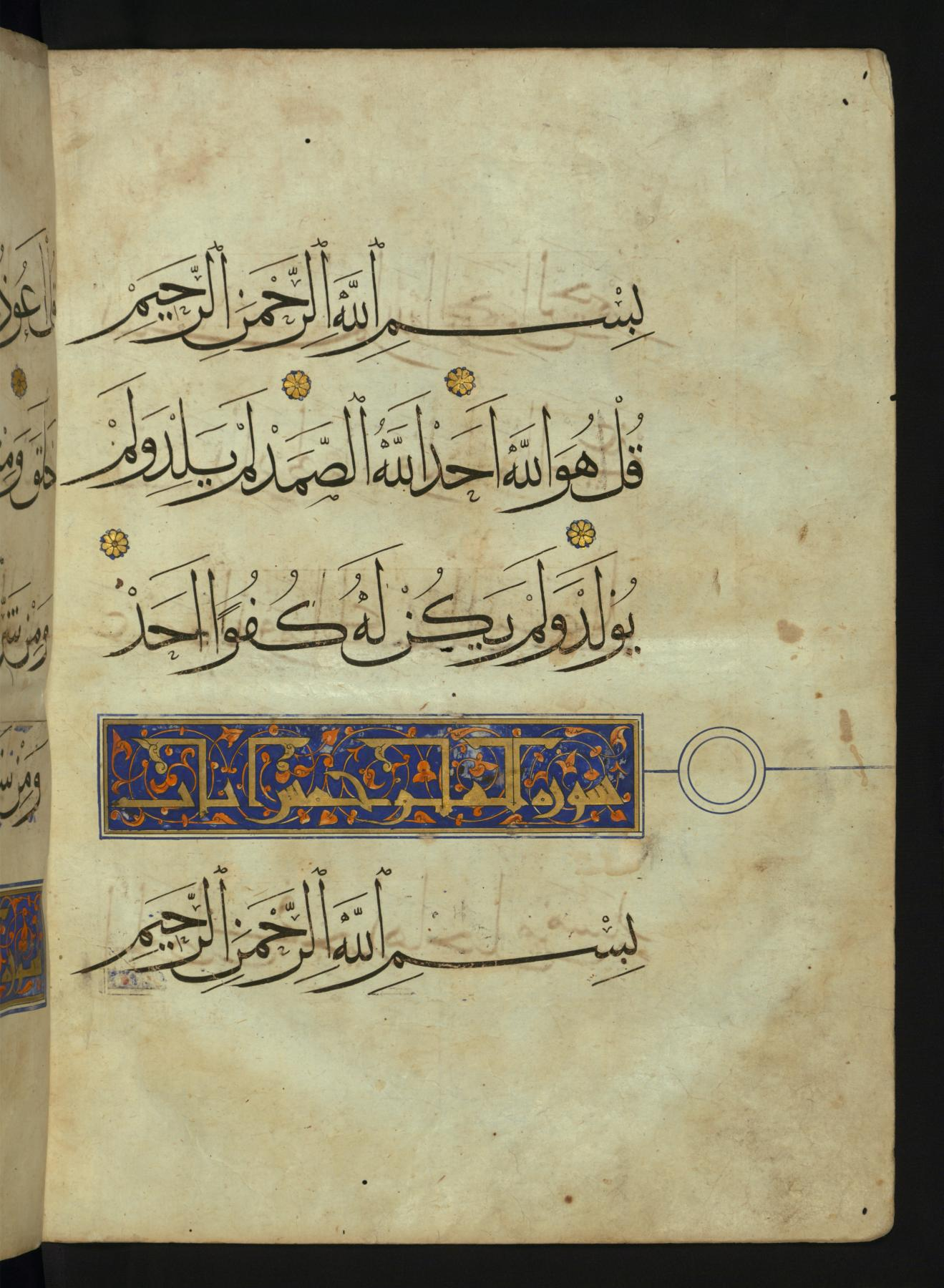
15th century Timurid mansucript of Al-Ikhlas

=== Text and transliteration ===
- Hafs from Aasim ibn Abi al-Najud

بِسْمِ ٱللَّٰهِ ٱلرَّحْمَـٰنِ ٱلرَّحِيمِ
bi-smi llāhi r-raḥmāni r-raḥīm(i)
قُلْ هُوَ ٱللَّٰهُ أَحَدٌ ۝١
¹ qul huwa llāhu ʾaḥad(un)
ٱللَّٰهُ ٱلصَّمَدُ ۝٢
² allāhu ṣ-ṣamad(u)
لَمْ يَلِدْ وَلَمْ يُولَدْ ۝٣
³ lam yalid wa-lam yūlad
وَلَمْ يَكُن لَّهُۥ كُفُوًا أَحَدٌۢ ۝٤
⁴ wa-lam yakun l-lahū kufuwan ʾaḥad(um)

- Warsh from Nafi‘ al-Madani

بِسْمِ ٱللَّٰهِ ٱلرَّحْمَـٰنِ ٱلرَّحِيمِ
bi-smi llāhi r-raḥmāni r-raḥīm(i)
قُلْ هُوَ ٱللَّٰهُ أَحَدٌ ۝١
¹ qul huwa llāhu ʾaḥad(un)
ٱللَّٰهُ ٱلصَّمَدُ ۝٢
² allāhu ṣ-ṣamad(u)
لَمْ يَلِدْ وَلَمْ يُولَدْ ۝٣
³ lam yalid wa-lam yūlad
وَلَمْ يَكُن لَّهُۥ كُفُؤًا اَحَدٌۢ ۝٤
⁴ wa-lam yakun l-lahū kufuʾan aḥad(um)

=== Translations ===
^{1} "Say, He is Allah, [who is] One,
^{2} Allah, the Eternal Refuge.
^{3} He neither begets nor is born,
^{4} Nor is there to Him any equivalent."

Translation: Saheeh International, 1997.

^{1} Say: He is Allah, the One and Only;
^{2} Allah, the Eternal, Absolute;
^{3} He begetteth not, nor is He begotten;
^{4} And there is none like unto Him.

Translation: Yusuf Ali, 1934.

^{1} Say: He is Allah, the One!
^{2} Allah, the eternally Besought of all!
^{3} He begetteth not nor was begotten.
^{4} And there is none comparable unto Him.

Translation: Pickthall, 1930.

=== Meaning ===
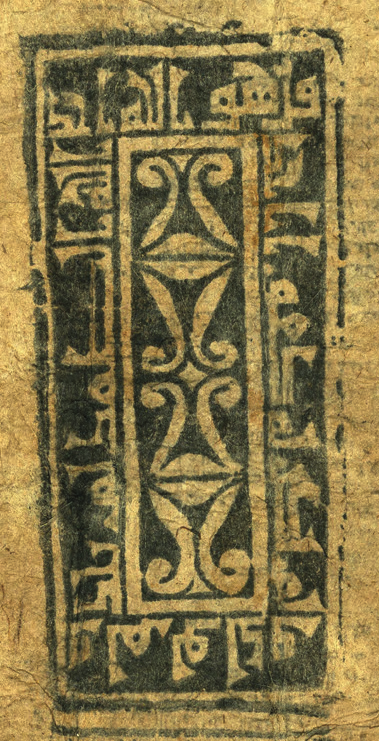
This print's crisper lines suggest it was the earlier print.

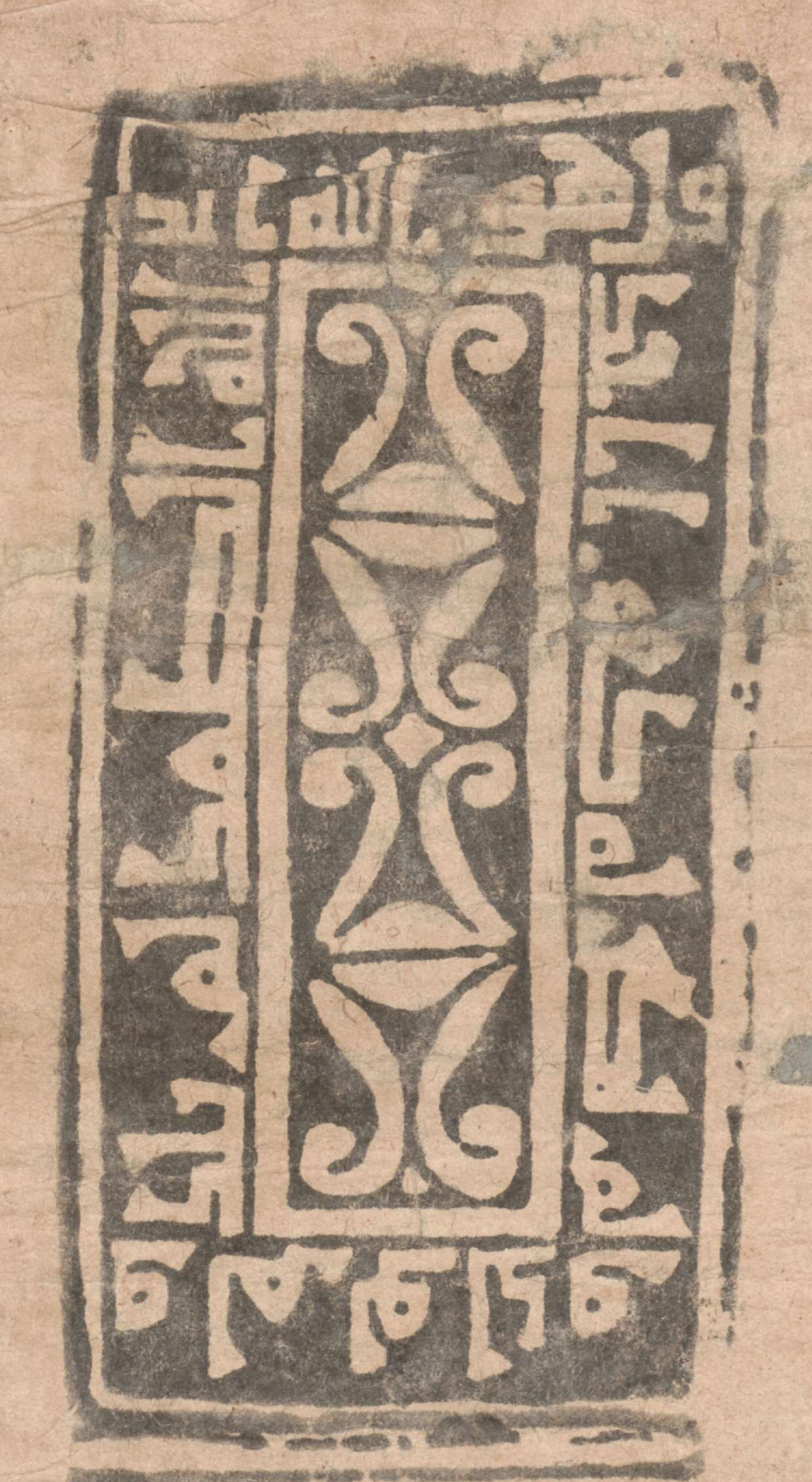
This print's more blurred lines suggests it was later, and that the print-block had worn down.

Al-Ikhlas at the top of some of the earliest blockprinted amulets. (10th-11th century)

1. Say: He, Allah, is al-Ahad (The Unique One of Absolute Oneness, i.e., single and indivisible with absolute and permanent unity and distinct from all else, who is unique in Its essence, attributes, names and acts, The One who has no second, no associate, no parents, no offspring, no peers, free from the concept of multiplicity or divisibility, and far from conceptualization and limitation, and there is nothing like Him in any respect).

2. Allah is al-Samad (The Ultimate Source of all existence, The uncaused cause Who created all things out of nothing, Who is eternal, absolute, immutable, perfect, complete, essential, independent, and self-sufficient; Who does not need to eat or drink, sleep or rest; Who needs nothing while all of creation is in absolute need of Him; The One eternally and constantly required and sought, depended upon by all existence and to whom all matters will ultimately return).

3. He begets not, nor is He begotten (He is Unborn and Uncreated, has no parents, wife or offspring).

4. And there is none comparable (equal, equivalent or similar) to Him.

== Material evidence ==
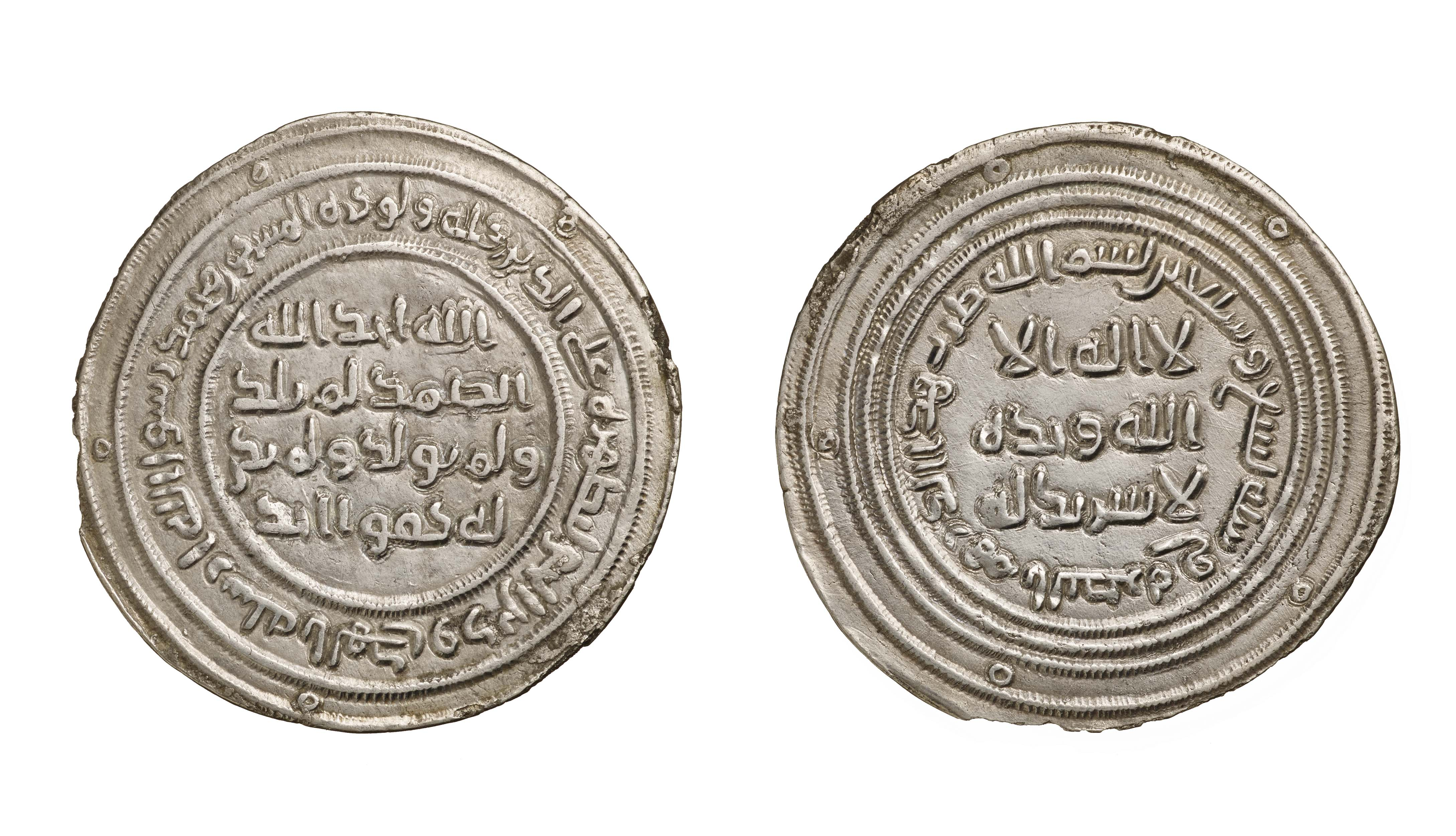
Umayyad coin minted at Basra with Al-Ikhlas on reverse (698)

The first three verses of Al-Ikhlas are known from a coin issued by Abd al-Malik ibn Marwan in 697 AD. It is also at the beginning of the major inscription on the Dome of the Rock, which dates to 691. Some of the early inscriptions of the surah contain a variant of the first verse, where the qul huwa of the first verse is missing (a variant also documented in the Islamic tradition). It is typically not found in early manuscripts because it is located towards the end of the Quran, and therefore, is in a location of a manuscript sensitive to damage, although it is present in the manuscript Sarayı Medina 1a.

== Historical context ==
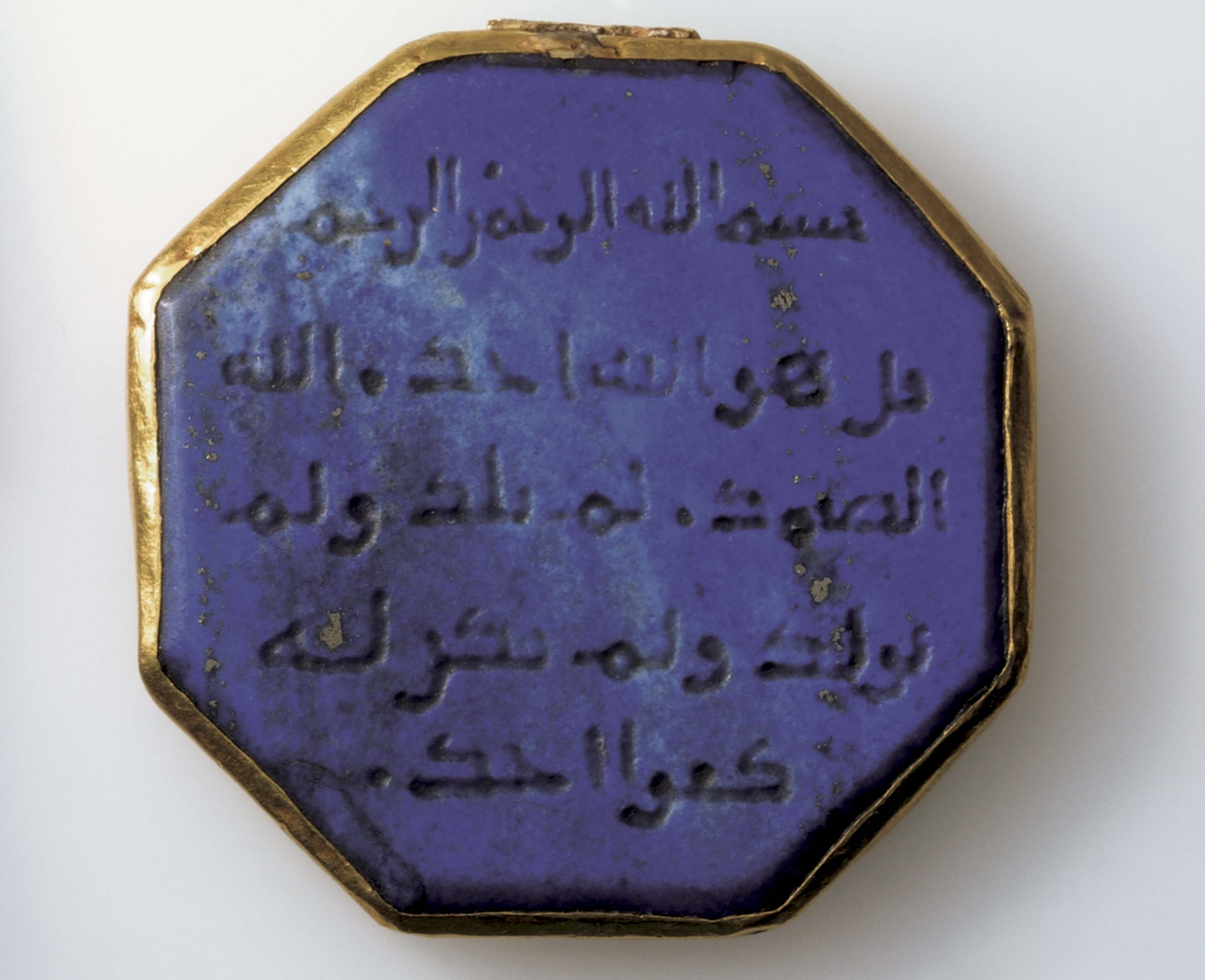
9th century lapis lazuli octagon with the full text of the surah, worn as a protective amulet, Khalili Collection of Islamic Art.

In Islamic tradition, the audience of Al-Ikhlas has been variously reported to be Jewish, Christian, or pagan. Various potential contextualizations have been suggested in Quranic studies. One suggestion relates the first verse to the Shema of the Book of Deuteronomy: "Hear, O Israel: YHVH is our God, YHVH is one" (Deut 6:4). Another suggestion, especially as advocated by Angelika Neuwirth, relates this verse as representing an antithesis or a counter to the Nicene Creed based on structural corresponds between the two. A recent proposal has compared this surah to Jacob's commentary of the Christological beliefs of the Christians of Najran in his 6th-century Letter to the Himyarites. This, in particular, resembles a Muslim tradition whereby the surah was revealed in the context of an arrival of a delegation of Christians from Najran into Muhammad's audience. Historically, it has been considered acceptable and referred to by Christians such as John of Damascus, as noted by Daniel J. Sahas who says: "In John of Damascus’ own theology the doctrine of the oneness and uniqueness of God plays an important role (...) He speaks there about God in similar terms as the Qur`an, and with the same emphasis: We believe in one God, one principle, without beginning, uncreated, unbegotten (...) The expression “‘nor has begotten” of the Quran is, therefore, equally acceptable to John of Damascus, who speaks of fatherhood [causation of the Word ] as a manner of existence of the same one [divine] substance, rather than in a physical sense."

== Exegesis ==
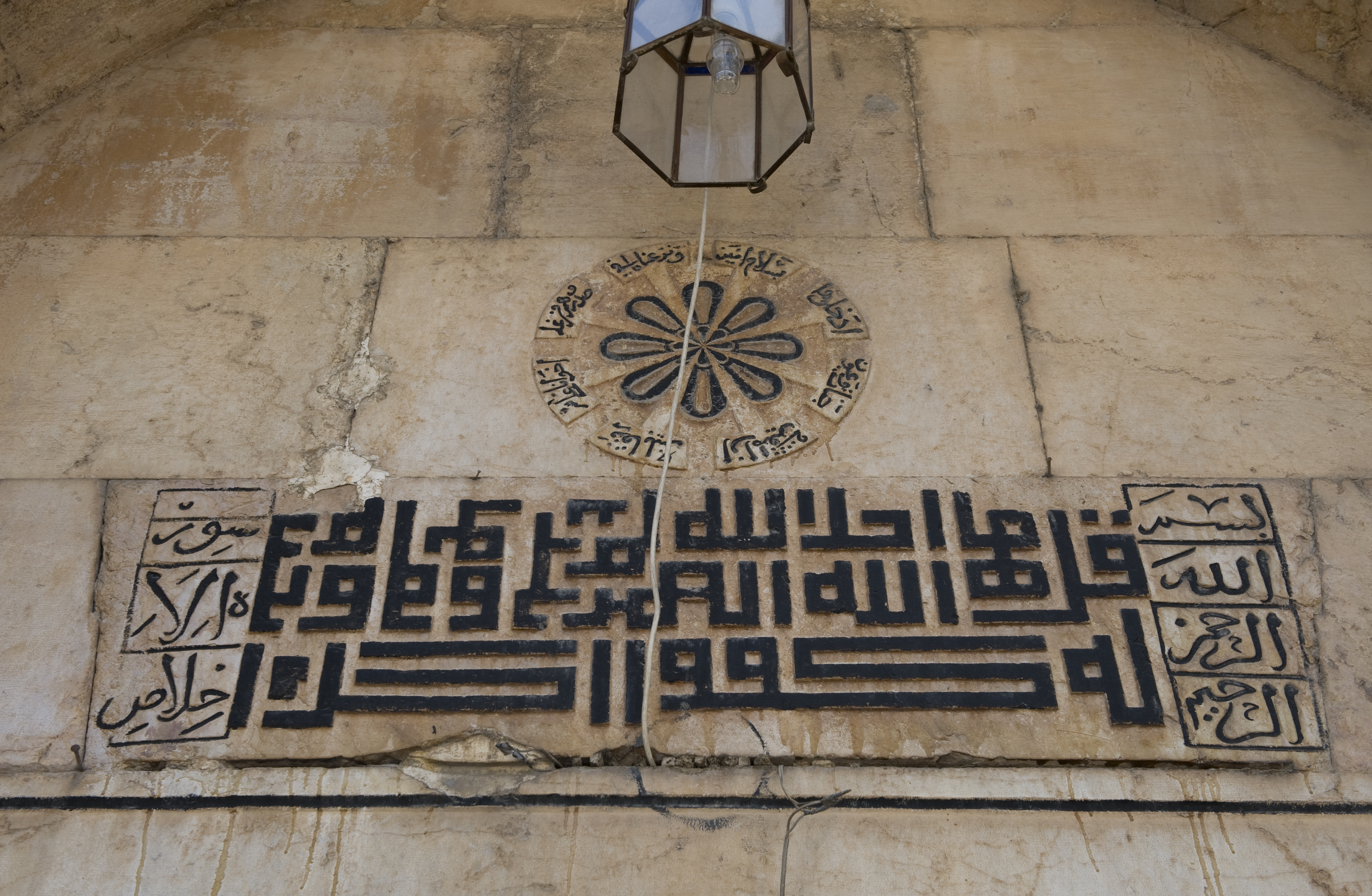
Square kufic Al-Ikhlas in Al-Rukniyah Madrasa(13th century)

In the early years of Islam, some surahs of the Quran came to be known by several different names, sometimes varying by region. This surah was among those to receive many different titles. It is a short declaration of tawhid, God's absolute oneness, consisting of four ayat. Al-Ikhlas means "the purity" or "the refining".

It is disputed whether this is a Meccan or Medinan surah. The former seems more probable, particularly since it seems to have been alluded to by Bilal ibn al-Harith, who, when he was being tortured by his cruel master, is said to have repeated "Ahad, Ahad!" (unique, referring as here to God). It is reported from Ubayy ibn Ka'b that it was revealed after the polytheists asked "O Muhammad! Tell us the lineage of your Lord."

=== Q112:1-2 None comparable to God ===
Surah Al-Ikhlas contains four verses: 112:1. Say: He is Allah, One. 112:2. Allah As-Samad. 112:3. He begets not, nor was He begotten. 112:4. And there is none comparable to Him.

About this, Tafsir Ibn Kathir says:

"When the Jews said, 'We worship Uzayr, the son of Allah', and the Christians said, 'We worship the Messiah (Isa), the son of Allah', and the Zoroastrians said, 'We worship the sun and the moon', and the idolaters said, 'We worship idols'. Allah revealed to His Messenger, Say: "He is Allah, One. He is the One, the Singular, Who has no peer, no assistant, no rival, no equal and none comparable to Him.

The word (Al-Ahad) cannot be used for anyone in affirmation except for Allah within the Islamic tradition.

== Hadith ==
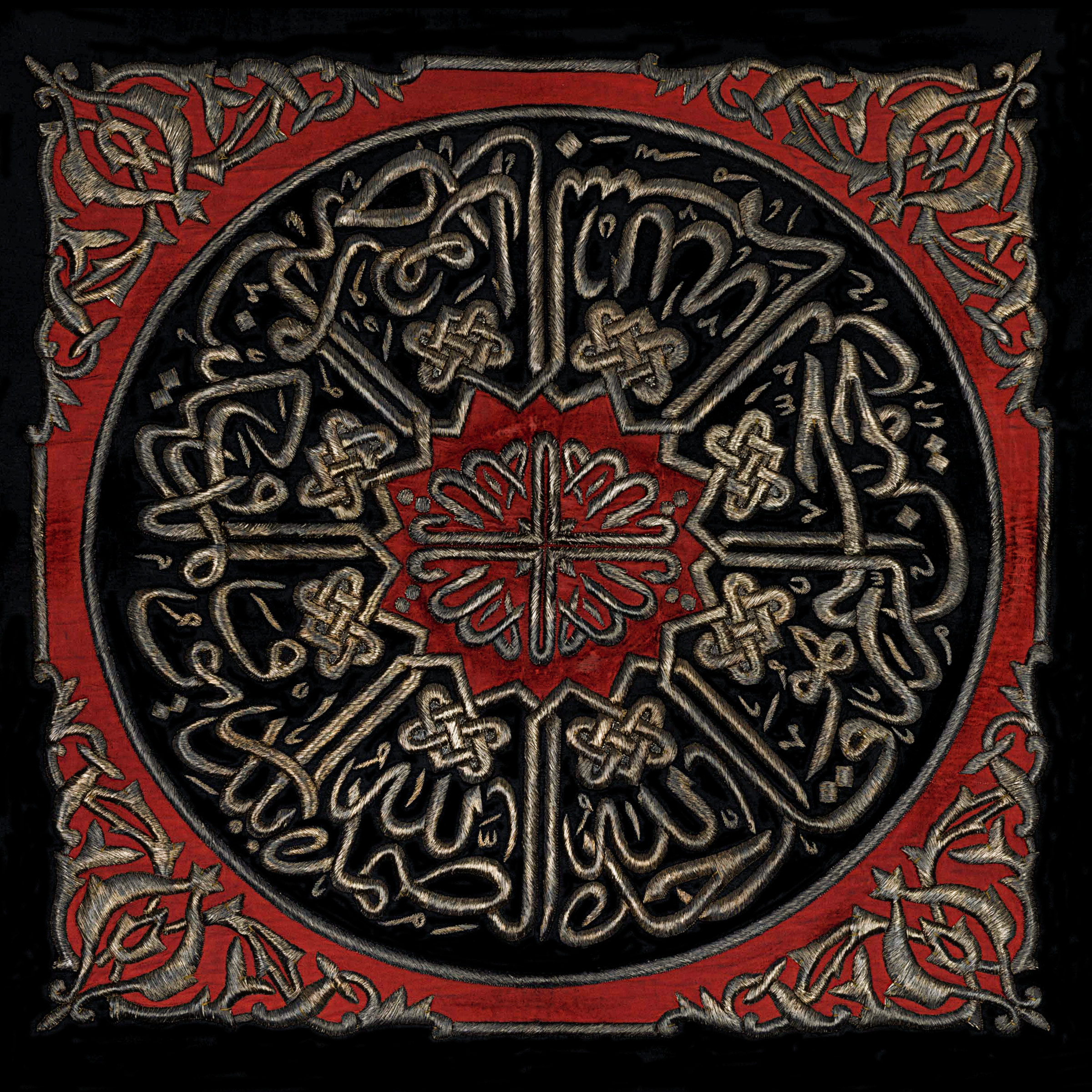
Al-Ikhlas on a fragment of the Kaba's Kiswah, late 19th century

According to hadiths, this surah is an especially important and honored part of the Quran:

- Narrated Abu Said Al-Khudri: A man heard another man reciting (in the prayers): 'Say (O Muhammad): "He is Allah, the One." (112.1) And he recited it repeatedly. When it was morning, he went to the Prophet and informed him about that as if he considered that the recitation of that Sura by itself was not enough. Allah's Apostle said, "By Him in Whose Hand my life is, it is equal to one-third of the Quran."
- Narrated Yahya related to me from Malik from Ibn Shihab that Humayd ibn Abd ar-Rahman ibn Awf had told him that Surat al-Ikhlas (Surah 112) was equal to a third of the Qur'an, and that Surat al-Mulk (Surah 67) pleaded for its owner.
- Narrated 'Aisha: The Prophet sent (an army unit) under the command of a man who used to lead his companions in the prayers and would finish his recitation with (the Sura 112): 'Say (O Muhammad): "He is Allah, the One." ' (112.1) When they returned (from the battle), they mentioned that to the Prophet. He said (to them), "Ask him why he does so." They asked him and he said, "I do so because it mentions the qualities of the Beneficent and I love to recite it (in my prayer)." The Prophet; said (to them), "Tell him that Allah loves him"
- Imam Malik ibn Anas recorded from Ubayd bin Hunayn that he heard Abu Hurayrah saying, "I went out with the Prophet and he heard a man reciting `Say: He is Allah, the One.' So the Messenger of Allah said, (It is obligatory). I asked, `What is obligatory' He replied, "Paradise."
- Narrated by Abu Said, the Prophet said to his companions, "Is it difficult for any of you to recite one third of the Qur'an in one night?" This suggestion was difficult for them so they said, "Who among us has the power to do so, O Allah's Apostle?" Allah Apostle replied: " Allah (the) One, the Self-Sufficient Master Whom all creatures need.' (Surat Al-Ikhlas 112.1 ..to the End) is equal to one third of the Qur'an."
- Al-Bukhari reported from Amrah bint Abdur-Rahman, who used to stay in the apartment of Aisha, the wife of the Prophet, that Aisha said, "The Prophet sent a man as the commander of a war expedition and he used to lead his companions in prayer with recitation (of the Quran). And he would complete his recitation with the recitation of `Say: He is Allah, One.' So when they returned they mentioned that to the Prophet and he said, Ask him why does he do that? So they asked him and he said, "Because it is the description of Ar-Rahman and I love to recite it. So the Prophet said, "Inform him that Allah the Most High loves him." This is how Al-Bukhari recorded this hadith in his book of tawhid. Muslim and an-Nisai also recorded it.

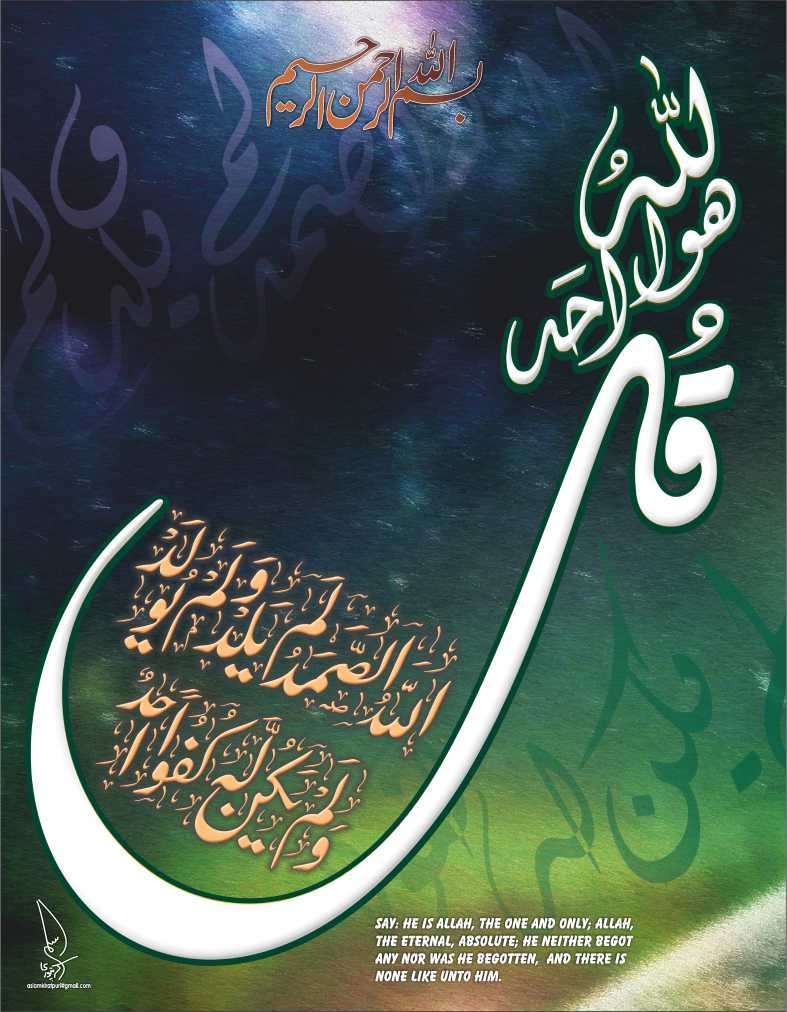
Contemporary calligraphy of Surah Ikhlas

- An authentic Hadith says 'Say [recite] Surat al-Ikhlās and al-Muawwidhatayn (Surat al-Falaq and Surat an-Nās) three times in the morning and the evening; they will suffice you from everything.' [Narrated by At-Tirmidhi. And Muhammad Nasiruddin al-Albani authenticated it: 2829
- Narrated Aisha: "Whenever the Prophet went to bed every night, he used to cup his hands together and blow over it after reciting Surah al-Ikhlas, Surah al-Falaq and Surah an-Nas, and then rub his hands over whatever parts of his body he was able to rub, starting with his head, face and front of his body. He used to do that three times.
- Imam Ahmad also recorded that Ibn 'Umar said, "I watched the Prophet twenty-four or twenty-five times reciting in the two Rak'ahs before the Morning prayer and the two Rak'ahs after the Sunset prayer, 'Say: "O ye infidels!"' (Surah Al-Kafirun) and "Say: "He is Allah, One."

== Gallery ==
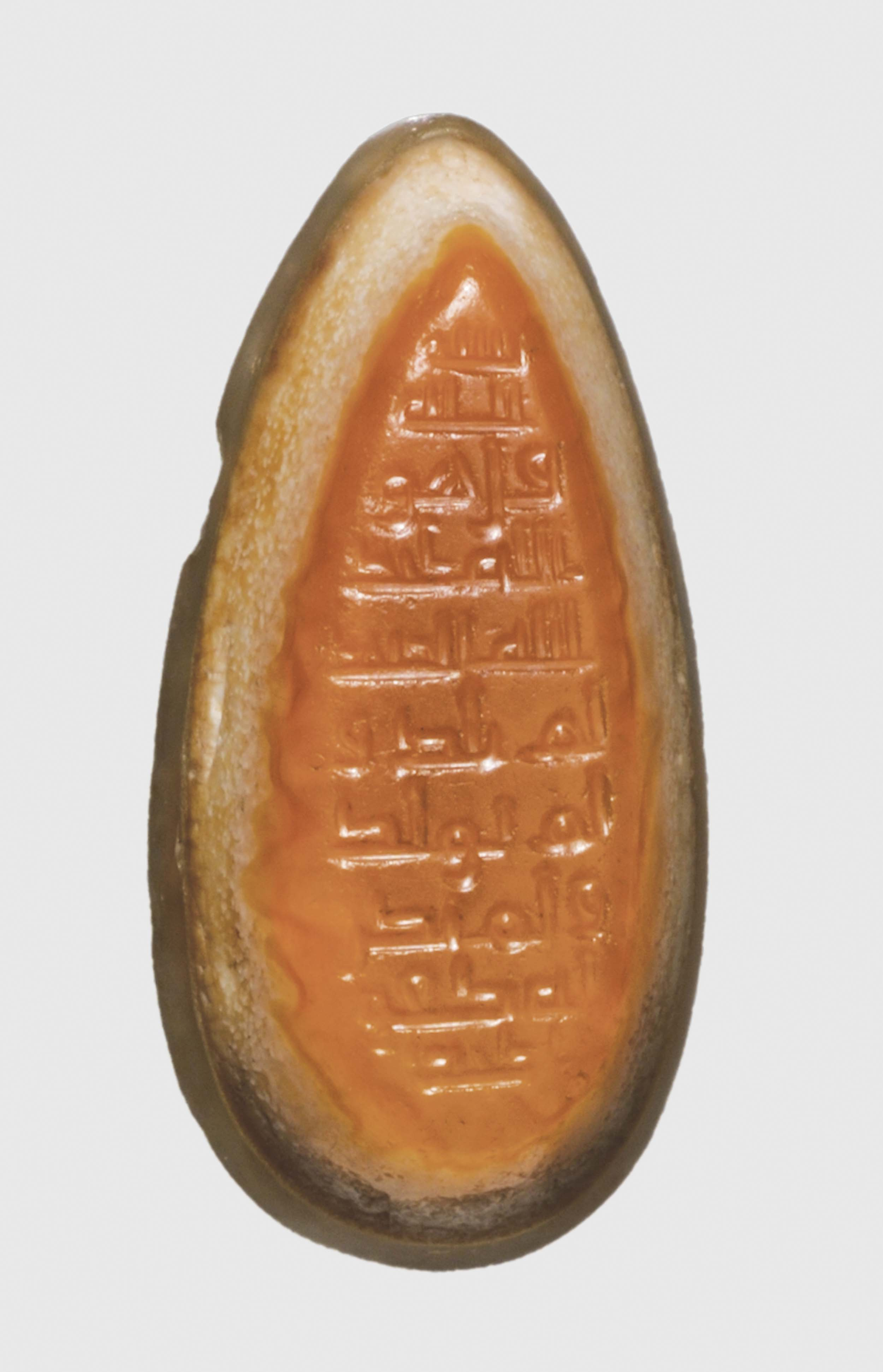
Onyx talisman is inscribed with Al-Ikhlas, 8th-9th century

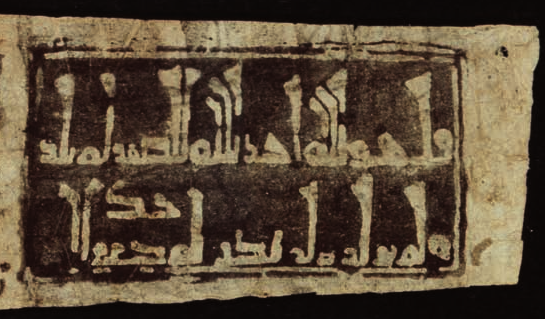
Medieval block printed Surah Ikhlas in foliated kufic

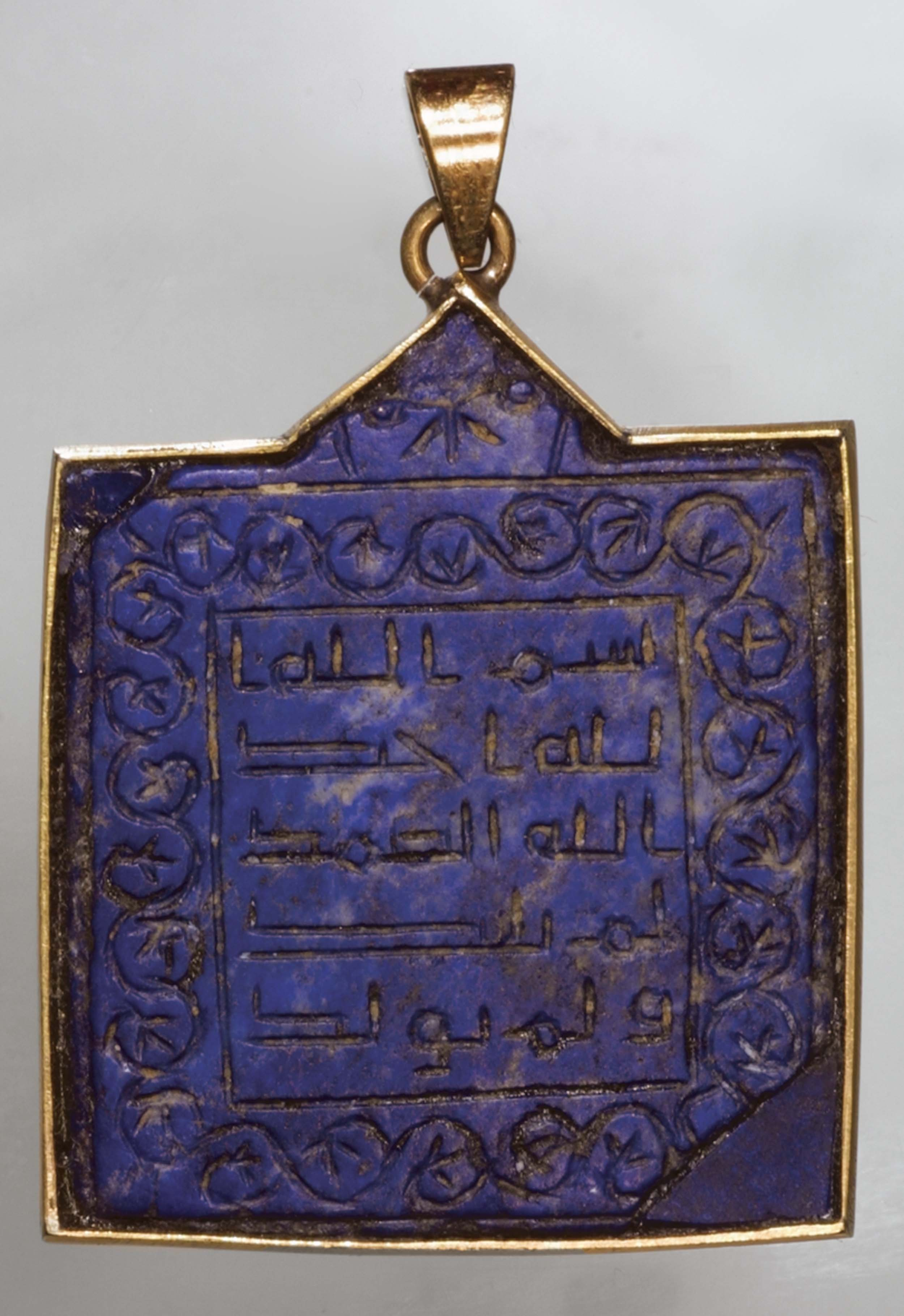
Lapis lazuli Talisman, 7-8th century

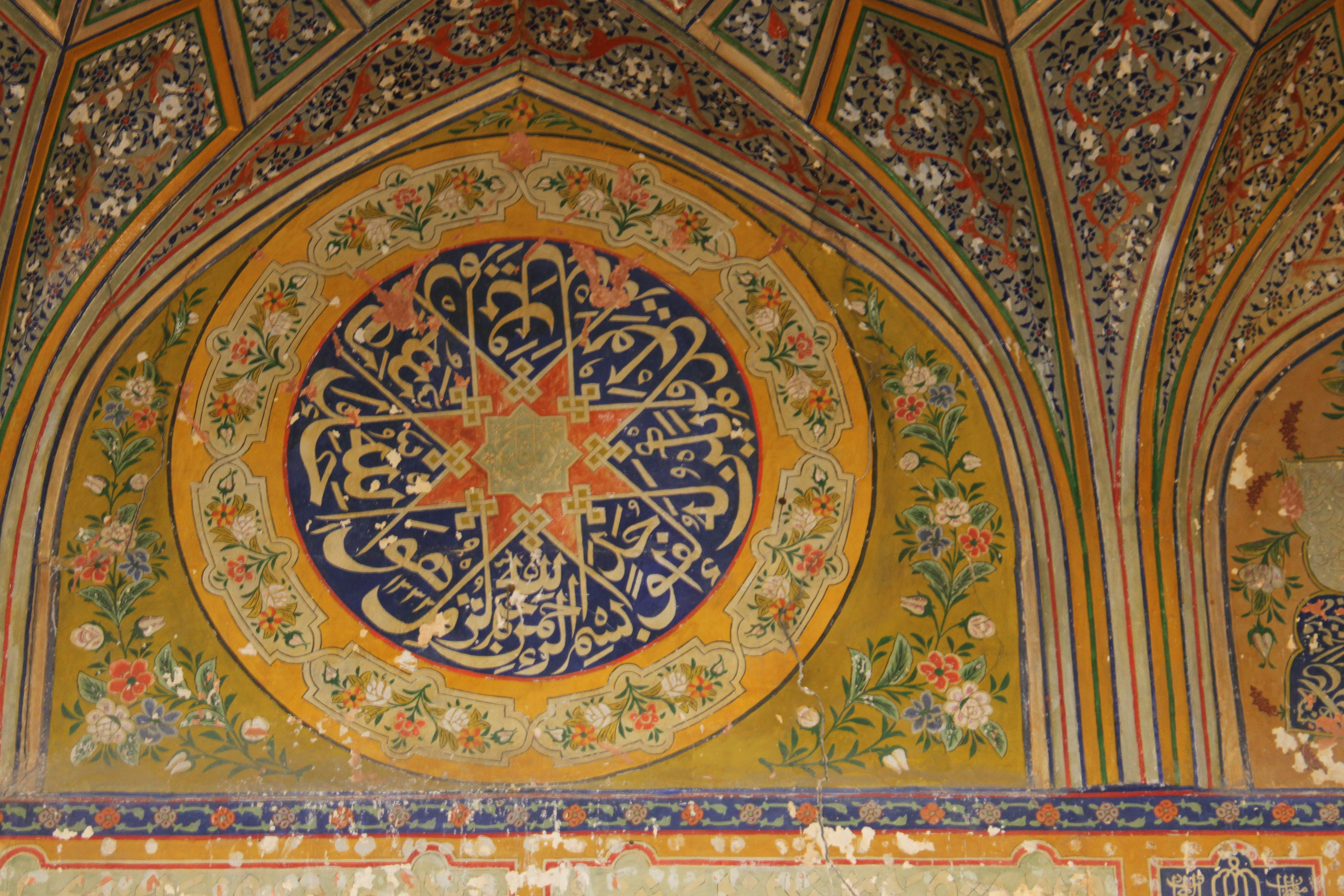
Khanqah of Nodir Devonbegi, Bukhara 1620

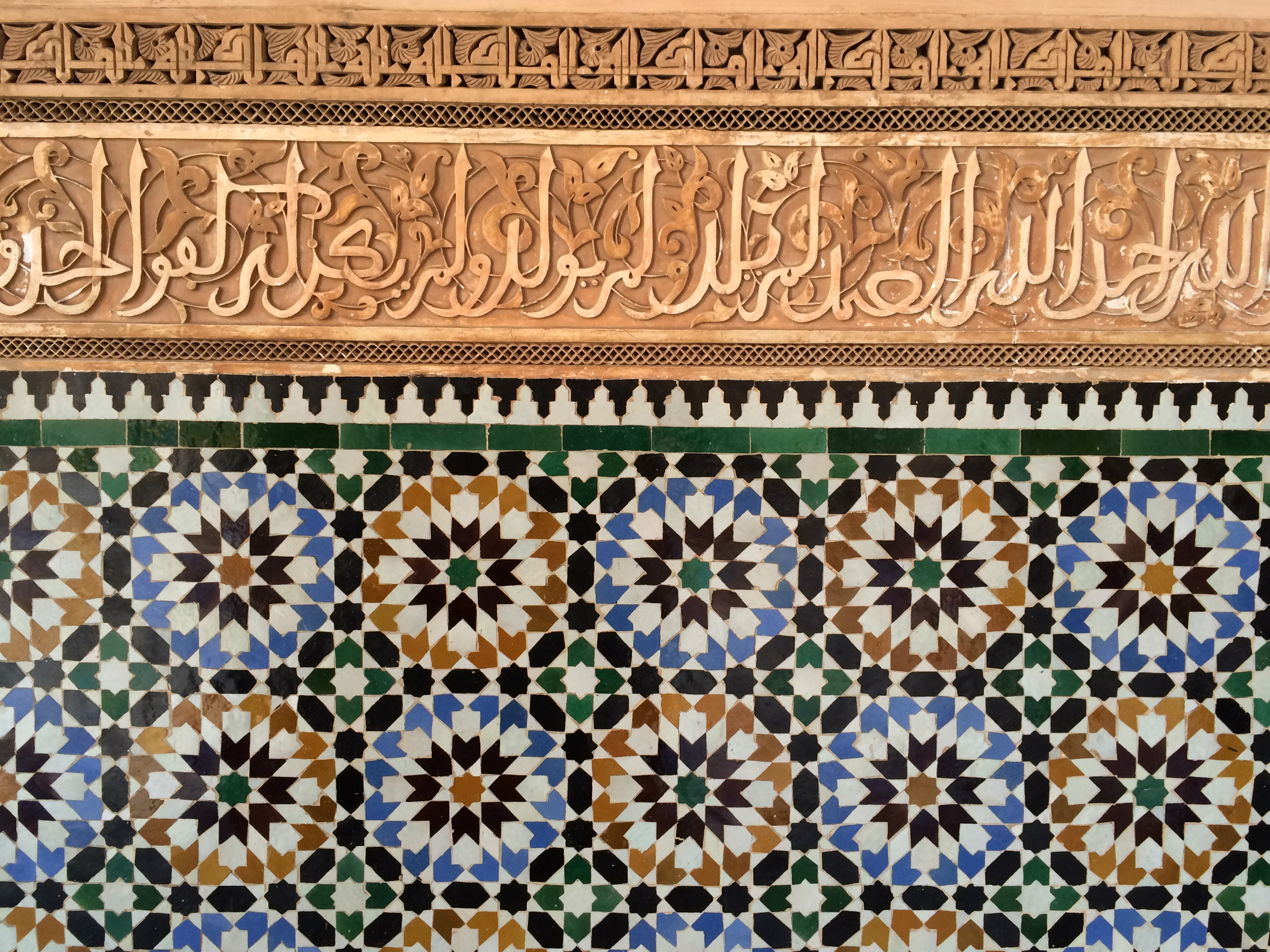
Al-Ikhlas carved into the wall of Ben Youssef Madrasa, 1564

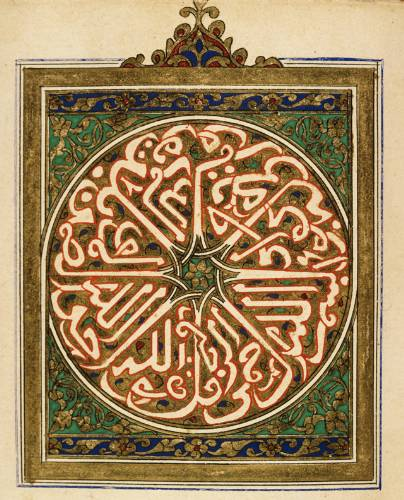
Al-Ikhlas in Maghribi script, 18th Century

== See also ==
- Al-Falaq
- Al-Nas
- Al-Mu'awwidhatayn
- Four Quls
