= Abd al-Ahad =

ʻAbd al-Aḥad (ALA-LC romanization of Arabic: عبد الأحد) is a masculine given name and surname of Arabic origin. It is built from the Arabic words ʻabd and al-Aḥad, one of the names of God in Islam. It is listed in the Qur'an, which give rise to the Muslim theophoric names. It means "servant of the only One". Abd al-Ahad is also common among Arabic-speaking Christians, particularly Syriac Orthodox, Syriac Catholics, and Chaldean Catholics—several of whose clergymen, including the late patriarch Ignatius Peter VIII Abdul-Ahad, have borne the name. It was chosen as the Arabic equivalent of Dominic. For Christians with the name Abd al-Ahad, the name is interpreted as 'Servant of Sunday' with 'Ahad' signifying Sunday and 'Abd' meaning servant. The title 'Servant of Sunday' symbolizes a dedication or devotion to Sunday, which holds particular significance in Christianity as the day of Christ's resurrection and a day of worship and rest. Notable people with the name include:

== Given name ==
- ʽAbd al-Ahad Khan (1859–1910), emir of the Emirate of Bukhara
- Abd ul-Aḥad Dāwūd, name adopted by David Benjamin Keldani (1867–1940), Persian Catholic priest who converted to Islam
- Abdel Ahad Gamal El Din, Egyptian politician
- Abdul Ahad (music director) (1918–1996), Bangladeshi lyricist and music director
- Abdulahad AbdulNour (1888–1948), Iraqi physician, politician, and humanitarian
- Abdul Ahad Azad (1903–1948), Kashmiri poet
- Abdul Ahad Fazli, Afghan Taliban official
- Abdul Ahad Hajini (born 1948), Indian writer, translator, and treasurer
- Abdul Ahad Karzai, (1922–1999), Afghan politician
- Abdulahad Malik (born 1986), Indian cricketer
- Abdul Ahad Momand (1959–2026), Afghan-German cosmonaut
- Abdul Ahad Talib, Afghan Taliban politician and commander
- Abdul-Ahad Dawood Tappouni, birth name of Ignatius Gabriel I Tappuni (1879–1968), patriarch of the Syriac Catholic Church
- Abdul Ahad Vakil (1934–2014), Indian politician
- Abdul Ahad Wardak (1880–1949), Afghan politician
- Abdul'ahat Abdulrixit (born 1942), chairman of the Xinjiang Uyghur Autonomous Region in China
- Shah Abdul Ahad Afzali, Afghan politician

== Surname ==
- Ghaith Abdul-Ahad (born 1975), Iraqi journalist
- Ignatius Peter VIII Abdalahad (1930–2018), patriarch of the Syriac Catholic Church
