= Al-Kafirun =

109th chapter of the Qur'an

Surah 109 of the Quran
ٱلكَافِرُون Al-Kāfirūn The Kafirs
- Qira'ah; English text
- Classification: Meccan
- Other names: The Unbelievers, The Nonbelievers
- Position: Juzʼ 30
- Hizb no.: 60
- No. of verses: 6
- No. of words: 27
- No. of letters: 98

Al-Kafirun
Recitation of Al-Kafirun in mujawwad.

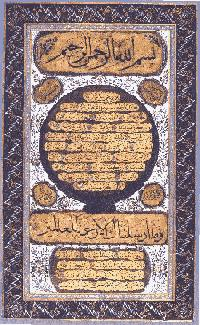

Al-Kāfirūn (Arabic: الكافرون, "The Kafirs") is the 109th chapter (sūrah) of the Quran. It has six ayat or verses as follows:

۝ Say, "O disbelievers,
۝ I do not worship what you worship.
۝ Nor are you worshippers of what I worship.
۝ Nor will I be a worshipper of what you worship.
۝ Nor will you be worshippers of what I worship.
۝ For you is your religion, and for me is my religion."

== Text and meaning ==
=== Text and transliteration ===
- Hafs from Aasim ibn Abi al-Najud

بِسْمِ ٱللَّهِ ٱلرَّحْمَٰنِ ٱلرَّحِيمِ ۝
Bismi l-lāhi r-raḥmāni r-raḥīm(i)
قُلْ يَٰٓأَيُّهَا ٱلْكَٰفِرُونَ ۝١
^{1} Qul yāʾayyuha l-kāfirūn(a)
لَآ أَعْبُدُ مَا تَعْبُدُونَ ۝٢
^{2} Lā ʾaʿbudu mā taʿbudūn(a)
وَلَآ أَنتُمْ عَٰبِدُونَ مَآ أَعْبُدُ ۝٣
^{3} Walā ʾantum ʿābidūna mā ʾaʿbud(u)
وَلَآ أَنَا۠ عَابِدٌ مَّا عَبَدتُّمْ ۝٤
^{4} Walā ʾana ʿābidun mmā ʿabadttum
وَلَآ أَنتُمْ عَٰبِدُونَ مَآ أَعْبُدُ ۝٥
^{5} Walā ʾantum ʿābidūna mā ʾaʿbud(u)
لَكُمْ دِينُكُمْ وَلِىَ دِينِ ۝٦
^{6} Lakum dīnukum waliya dīn(i)

- Warsh from Nafiʽ al-Madani

بِسمِ اِللهِ اِلرَّحمَٰنِ اِلرَّحِيمِ ۝
Bismi l-lāhi r-raḥmāni r-raḥīm(i)
قُل يَٰٓأَيُّهَا اَلكَٰفِرُونَ ۝١
^{1} Qul yāʿayyuha l-kāfirūn(a)
لَآ أَعبُدُ مَا تَعبُدُونَ ۝٢
^{2} Lā ʾaʿbudu mā taʿbudūn(a)
وَلَآ أَنتُم عَٰبِدُونَ مَآ أَعبُدُ ۝٣
^{3} Walā ʾantum ʿābidūna mā ʾaʿbud(u)
وَلَآ أَنَا۠ عَابِدٌ مَّا عَبَدتُّم ۝٤
^{4} Walā ʾana ʿābidun mmā ʿabadttum
وَلَآ أَنتُم عَٰبِدُونَ مَآ أَعبُدُ ۝٥
^{5} Walā ʾantum ʿabidūna mā ʾaʿbud(u)
لَكُم دِينُكُم وَلِىَ دِينِ ۝٦
^{6} Lakum dīnukum waliya dīn(i)

=== Translations ===
^{1} Say (O Muhammad to these Mushrikun and Kafirun): “O Al-Kafirun (disbelievers in God, in His Oneness, in His Angels, in His Books, in His Messengers, in the Day of Resurrection, and in Al-Qadar, etc.)!
^{2} I worship not that which you worship,
^{3} Nor will you worship that which I worship.
^{4} And I shall not worship that which you are worshipping.
^{5} Nor will you worship that which I worship.
^{6} To you be your religion, and to me my religion (Tawhid).”

Translation: Noble Quran, 1999

^{1} Say, “O disbelievers,
^{2} I do not worship what you worship.
^{3} Nor are you worshippers of what I worship.
^{4} Nor will I be a worshipper of what you worship.
^{5} Nor will you be worshippers of what I worship.
^{6} For you is your religion, and for me is my religion.”

Translation: Saheeh International, 1997

^{1} Say: “O ye that reject Faith!
^{2} I worship not that which ye worship,
^{3} Nor will ye worship that which I worship.
^{4} And I will not worship that which ye have been wont to worship,
^{5} Nor will ye worship that which I worship.
^{6} To you be your Way, and to me mine.”

Translation: Yusuf Ali, 1934

^{1} Say: “O disbelievers!
^{2} I worship not that which ye worship;
^{3} Nor worship ye that which I worship.
^{4} And I shall not worship that which ye worship.
^{5} Nor will ye worship that which I worship.
^{6} Unto you your religion, and unto me my religion.”

Translation: Pickthall, 1930

== Summary ==
- 1-6 Muhammad declines to compromise with idolatry

Like many of the shorter surahs, the surah of the unbelievers takes the form of an invocation, telling the reader something they must ask for or say aloud. Here, the passage declares the separation between belief and unbelief both in the past and the present, ending with a firm rejection of the disbelief in Allah and Muhammad, "to you your religion, and to me mine".

Al-Kafirun is classified as a Meccan surah, meaning it's believed to have been revealed in Mecca. According to tradition, the surah was revealed when some chieftains of Mecca, including Walid ibn al-Mughira, proposed peace to Muhammad that one year the Muslims would worship pagan gods, and the next year Meccans would worship Allah.

== Hadith ==
- Abdullah ibn Umar has related that on many an occasions he heard Muhammad recite Surahs Qul Ya- ayyuhal- kafirun and Qul Huwu-Allahu ahad in the two rakats before the Fajr obligatory prayer and in the two rakats after Maghrib prayer.
- Khabbab ibn al-Aratt says: "The Holy Prophet (upon whom be peace) said to me: when you lie down in bed to sleep, recite Qul ya-ayyuhal kafirun, and this was the Holy Prophet's own practice also; when he lay down to sleep, he recited this Surah."
- According to Ibn Abbas, Muhammad said to the people: "Should I tell you the word which will protect you from polytheism? It is that you should recite Qul ya-ayyuhal kafirun when you go to bed."
- Anas says that Muhammad said to Mu'adh bin Jabal; "Recite Qul ya-ayyuhal-kafirun at the time you go to bed, for this is immunity from polytheism."
- Both Fardah bin Naufal and Abdur Rahman bin Naufal have stated that their father, Naufal bin Muawiyah al-Ashjai, said to Muhammad: "Teach me something which I may recite at the time I go to bed." Muhammad replied: "Recite Qul ya-ayyuhal kafirun to the end and then sleep, for this is immunity from polytheism." A similar request was made by Jabalah bin Harithah, brother of Said bin Harithah, to Muhammad and to him also he gave the same reply.
- Muhammad recited in the two rakahs before the morning prayer and the two rakahs after the sunset prayer on ten or twenty occasions: Say O' al-Kafirun and say He is God, the One (surah 112: al-Ikhlas).
