= Al-Mu'awwidhatayn =

Arabic term for the last two suras (chapters) of the Qur'an

Al-Mu'awwidhatayn (Arabic: المعوذتين), an Arabic expression meaning "The Two Protectors" or "The Two Protective Incantations", refers to the final two surahs (chapters) of the Quran: 113 (Al-Falaq) and 114 (Al-Nas). They are called by this name because of their use of the term ʿādhā (meaning "protection" or "refuge") in a phrase that occurs in both surahs: ʿqul aʿūdhu bi-rabbi al- ... min ... ("Say: I seek refuge with the Lord of ... from/against ... "). Likewise, the two surahs appear consecutively in the Qur'an, are both very short, and bear additional stylistic resemblances with one another, broadly functioning as incantations that appeal to God's protection from evils or ailments. Some in the Islamic tradition have claimed that the two surahs were also revealed at the same time to Prophet Muhammad.

Some scholars have argued that the content and style of the Al-Mu'awwidhatayn is "wholly different" from the rest of that in the Quran. Relatedly, the placement of the Al-Mu'awwidhatayn in the Quran appears to have been disputed in the earliest years of Islam, as these two surahs, along with Surah Al-Fatihah (the first chapter of the Uthmanic codex used today), are absent from the codex of Ibn Mas'ud, one of Muhammad's companions. Their inclusion may have reflected the mission of the Uthmanic committee to a fully canonical text.

== Text ==
=== Al-Falaq ===
1. Say, “I seek refuge in the Lord of Daybreak.
2. From the evil of what He created.
3. And from the evil of the darkness as it gathers.
4. And from the evil of those who practice sorcery.
5. And from the evil of an envious when he envies.”

=== Al-Nas ===
1. Say, “I seek refuge in the Lord of mankind.
2. The King of mankind.
3. The God of mankind.
4. From the evil of the sneaky whisperer.
5. Who whispers into the hearts of people.
6. From among jinn and among people.”

== Style and genre ==
The genre of these surahs has been described as prophylactic incantations, meant to ward off evil, and to be recited in a private as opposed to a public domain. One stylistic feature of the Al-Mu'awwidhatayn, shared only in Surah 1 and Surah 109 elsewhere in the Quran, is the use of the first-person human voice throughout the entire surah. To the exclusion of Surah 109, however, these three surahs are more closely grouped by that the first-person singular is structured as a prayer towards God. Like Surah 112, the Al-Mu'awwidhatayn also begin with the formula "Say!" (kul). Only in the Mu'awwidhatayn, however, this is followed by the expression "I seek refuge in the Lord" (aʿūdhu birabbi), which also appears as a common near eastern formula outside of the Quran. The surahs proceed with an enunciation of ailments from which God is appealed to for protection from.

Though there are important structural similarities between the two surahs, there are also important stylistic differences, especially thematically and lexically:

- While Surah 113 has end-rhyme, often focusing on the assonance of the q-root in the first four of the five end-words in the surah, Surah 114 focuses on the use of the same word entirely (nās) at the end of all six lines but one.
- A much greater-use of the phrase "from the evil of" in Surah 113, where it appears three times, versus only one in Surah 114.
- Three referents to God's leadership over humanity in Surah 114 ("the Lord of humanity, the King of humanity, the God of humanity"), versus none in Surah 113.
- The focus on evil in Surah 113, versus the focus on the devil in Surah 114.
- There are five words in Surah 113 that occur in no other surah (terms that are known as hapax legomena), including: falaq (dawn), ghāsiq (nightgloom), waqab (blots), naffāthāt (whispering sorceresses) and ʿuqad (talismanic knots). By contrast, only one word occurs in Surah 114 that does not occur anywhere else in the Quran: khannās (stealthily).

== Structure ==
The placement of Al-Mu'awwidhatayn at the end of the Quran has raised questions as to why it appeared there. Historians have put forwards multiple explanations for why this occurred. For Theodor Noldeke and Friedrich Schwally, this occurred due to a superstition that this placement would afford protection to the reciter. Angelika Neuwirth, following and updating the theory of Noldeke and Schwally, argued that the surahs functioned as something akin to a colophon that closed the Quran and helped protect it from profanation.

The placement of these two surahs at the end of the Quran fulfills a broader purpose alongside the placement of Al-Fatihah at the beginning of the Quran: Al-Fatihah formally opens up the Quranic text, whereas these two surahs close it with appeals to divine protection from harm.

Chronologically, Raymond Farrin has placed these passages as having been formulated around the same time as Surah 23 based on stylistic correspondences between the two.

== Historical context ==
Devin J. Stewart has related the content of Al-Mu'awwidhatayn to pre-Islamic protective charms, typically structured in the form of (1) "I take refuge" (2) "in the Lord of [X], from the evil of [Y]". Emran El-Badawi has argued that these texts belongs to a tradition of amulets in the form of the performance of apotropaic magic, or magic that is purposed to turn away or ward off evil influences. El-Badawi has observed, for example, that several early manuscripts containing these surahs are small papyrus amulets. El-Badawi compares these surahs to the Greek Amulet of Alexandria, which El-Badawi argues closely resembles their style and syntax, including in the purpose of calling upon God to protect the reciter from demons, spirits and sorcery, alongside several more specific syntactic similarities.

Giovanni Mazzini has related a sorcerous act involving blowing/spitting from Surah 113:4, referred to by the root nfṯ, to a similar violation described with the same root in an earlier Sabaic inscription. The two texts both seek to attain protection from the deity by those who seek to cause harm by this act and may be drawing on beliefs about the nature and threat of magical activities from pre-Islamic Arabia in doing so. Ahmad Al-Jallad has related the reference to cultic whispering in Surah 114:4 to an inscription that requests the aid of a deity in the face of "whisperer's mischief". He also relates the Quranic reference to cultic whispering to wider classical and ancient Near Eastern attestations of this phenomenon.

== See also ==
- List of Islamic terms in Arabic
- Al-Fatiha (the first surah in the Quran)
- Al-Musabbihat (surahs in the Quran that begin with the glorification of God)
- Muqattaʿat (surahs in the Quran that begin with disconnected letters)
