= Al-Falaq =

113th chapter of the Qur'an

Surah 113 of the Quran
ٱلْفَلَقِ Al-Falaq The Daybreak
- Qira'ah; English text
- Classification: Meccan
- Position: Juzʼ 30
- No. of verses: 5
- No. of words: 23
- No. of letters: 71

Al-Falaq
Recitation of Al-Falaq in mujawwad.

Al-Falaq (Arabic: ٱلْفَلَقِ), is the 113th and penultimate chapter (sūrah) of the Qur'an. Alongside the 114th surah (Al-Nas), it helps form the Al-Mu'awwidhatayn. Al-Falaq is a brief five ayat (verse) surah, asking God for protection from evil:

۝ Say, "I seek refuge in the Lord of daybreak, (Note: o The original word properly signifies a cleaving, and denotes, says, the production of all things from the darkness of privation to the light of existence. Hence it is used more particularly to signify the breaking forth of the light from darkness.)
۝ From the evil of His creation (Note: p ie from the mischiefs/evils proceeding either from the perverseness and evil choice of those beings with free will, or the effects of necessary natural agents: fire, poison etc, the world being good in the whole, though evils may follow from those two causes.)
۝ And from the evil of darkness when it settles (Note: q May also be rendered, "From the mischief of the moon, when she is eclipsed".)
۝ And from the evil of the blowers in knots (Note: r Witches, were believed to tie string into a number of knots while blowing upon them and murmuring magic incantations. The Knots which the wizards in the northern parts tie, when they sell mariners a wind (if the stories told of them be true), are also relics of the same superstition. The commentators relate that Lobeid, a Jew, with the assistance of his daughters, bewitched Mohammed, by tying eleven knots on a cord, which they hid in a well; whereupon Mohammed falling ill, GOD revealed this chapter and the following, and Gabriel acquainted him with the use he was to make of them, and of the place where the cord was hidden: according to whose directions the prophet sent Ali to fetch the cord, and the same being brought, he repeated the two chapters over it, and at every verse (for they consist of eleven) a knot was loosed, till on finishing the last words, he was entirely freed from the charm.)
۝ And from the evil of an envier when he envies."

Al-Falaq in Arabic language is (break apart; burst; cleave; fissure)[1] and was also explained as (creatures or creation) whereas it meant (Daybreak) in old explanations.

However, this surah refer to God (رب الفلق) as the creator, who had created from nothing, the whole universe and all creatures, and we may understand that God almighty (as having complete power; omnipotent) had split the Nothingness (the zero) into two halves (positive and negative) and kept these two halves apart in the form of atoms by his eternal power which in modern science is known to be the basis of the whole universe.

Thus (Al-Falaq) may mean the whole universe and all creatures, so that, in this surah, the believer ask God the creator of the universe to protect him from all kinds of evils in the universe and evils in all the creatures.

== Context ==
This surah and the 114th (and last) surah in the Qur'an, an-Nās, are collectively referred to as al-Mu'awwidhatayn, "the Refuges", as both begin with "I seek refuge"; an-Nās tells to seek Allah for refuge from the evil from within, while al-Falaq tells to seek Allah for refuge from the evil from outside, so reading both of them would protect a person from his own mischief and the mischief of others.

Regarding the timing and contextual background of the believed revelation (asbāb al-nuzūl), it is an earlier "Meccan surah", which indicates a revelation in Mecca rather than in Medina. Early Muslims were persecuted in Mecca where Muhammed was not a leader, and not persecuted in Medina, where he was a protected leader.

The word "al-Falaq" in the first verse, a generic term referring to the process of 'splitting', has been restricted in most translations to one particular type of splitting, namely 'daybreak' or 'dawn'.

Verse 4 refers to one of the soothsayer's techniques: partially tying a knot, uttering a curse, spitting into the knot and pulling it tight. In the pre-Islamic period, soothsayers claimed the power to cause various illnesses. According to soothsayers the knot had to be found and untied before the curse could be lifted. This practice is condemned in verse 4.

== Text and meaning ==
=== Text and transliteration ===
- Hafs from Aasim ibn Abi al-Najud

بِسْمِ ٱللَّٰهِ ٱلرَّحْمَـٰنِ ٱلرَّحِيمِ ۝
Bismi l-lāhi r-raḥmāni r-raḥīm(i)
قُلْ أَعُوذُ بِرَبِّ ٱلْفَلَقِ ۝١
¹ Qul ’a‘ūdhu birabbi l-falaq(i)
مِن شَرِّ مَا خَلَقَ ۝٢
² Min sharri mā khalaq(a)
وَمِن شَرِّ غَاسِقٍ إِذَا وَقَبَ ۝٣
³ Wamin sharri ghāsiqin ’idhā waqab(a)
وَمِن شَرِّ ٱلنَّفَّـٰـثَــٰتِ فِى ٱلْعُقَدِ ۝٤
⁴ Wamin sharrin n-naffāthāti fi l-‘uqad(i)
وَمِن شَرِّ حَاسِدٍ إِذَا حَسَدَ ۝٥
⁵ Wamin sharri ḥāsidin idhā ḥasad(a)

- Warsh from Nafi‘ al-Madani

بِسۡمِ اِ۬للَّهِ اِ۬لرَّحۡمَـٰنِ اِ۬لرَّحِيمِ ۝
Bismi l-lāhi r-raḥmāni r-raḥīm(i)
قُلَ اَعُوذُ بِرَبِّ اِ۬لۡفَلَقِ ۝١
¹ Qula ‘ūdhu birabbi l-falaq(i)
مِن شَرِّ مَا خَلَقَ ۝٢
² Min sharri mā khalaq(a)
وَمِن شَرِّ غَاسِقٍ اِذَا وَقَبَ ۝٣
³ Wamin sharri ghāsiqin idhā waqab(a)
وَمِن شَرِّ اِ۬لنَّفَّـٰـثَــٰتِ فِي اِ۬لۡعُقَدِ ۝٤
⁴ Wamin sharrin n-naffāthāti fi l-‘uqad(i)
وَمِن شَرِّ حَاسِدٍ اِذَا حَسَدَ ۝٥
⁵ Wamin sharri ḥāsidin idhā ḥasad(a)

=== Meanings ===
^{1} Say: "I seek refuge with (Allah) the Lord of the daybreak,
^{2} "From the evil of what He has created;
^{3} "And from the evil of the darkening (night) as it comes with its darkness; (or the moon as it sets or goes away).
^{4} "And from the evil of the witchcrafts when they blow in the knots,
^{5} "And from the evil of the envier when he envies."

Translation: Noble Quran, 1990

^{1} Say, "I seek refuge in the Lord of daybreak
^{2} From the evil of that which He created
^{3} And from the evil of darkness when it settles
^{4} And from the evil of the blowers in knots
^{5} And from the evil of an envier when he envies."

Translation: Saheeh International, 1997

^{1} Say: I seek refuge with the Lord of the Dawn
^{2} From the mischief of created things;
^{3} From the mischief of Darkness as it overspreads;
^{4} From the mischief of those who practise secret arts;
^{5} And from the mischief of the envious one as he practises envy.

Translation: Yusuf Ali, 1934

^{1} Say: I seek refuge in the Lord of the Daybreak
^{2} From the evil of that which He created;
^{3} From the evil of the darkness when it is intense,
^{4} And from the evil of malignant witchcraft,
^{5} And from the evil of the envier when he envieth.

Translation: Pickthall, 1930

== Hadith ==
The first and foremost exegesis/tafsir of the Qur'an is found in hadith of Muhammad. Although scholars including ibn Taymiyyah claim that Muhammad has commented on the whole of the Qur'an, others including Ghazali cite the limited amount of narratives, thus indicating that he has commented only on a portion of the Qur'an. Ḥadīth (حديث) is literally "speech" or "report", that is a recorded saying or tradition of Muhammad validated by isnad; with Sirah Rasul Allah these comprise the sunnah and reveal shariah. According to Aishah, the life of Muhammad was practical implementation of Qur'an. Therefore, higher count of hadith elevates the importance of the pertinent surah from a certain perspective. This surah was held in special esteem in hadith, which can be observed by these related narratives. According to hadith, Muhammad used to recite this surah before sleeping every night.

- Abu 'Abdullah narrated that Ibn 'Abis Al-Juhani told him that: The Messenger of God [SAW] said to him: "O Ibn 'Abis, shall I not tell you of the best thing with which those who seek refuge with Allah may do so?" He said: "Yes, O Messenger of Allah." He said: "Say: I seek refuge with (Allah) the Lord of the daybreak." (Al-Falaq), "Say: I seek refuge with (Allah) the Lord of mankind." (Al-Nas) - these two Surahs."
- Aishah reported: Whenever the Messenger of Allah (ﷺ) went to bed, he would blow upon his hands recite Al-Mu'awwidhat; and pass his hands over his body (Al-Bukhari and Muslim).
- Aishah said : Every night when the prophet (May peace be upon him) went to his bed, he joined his hands and breathed into them, reciting into them: "say: he is Allah, One" (Al-Ikhlas) and say; I seek refuge in the Lord of the dawn (Al-Falaq) and Say: I seek refuge in the Lord of men (Al-Nas). Then he would wipe as much of his body as he could with his hands, beginning with his head, his face and the front of his body, doing that three times.
- Uqba ibn Amir reported: The Messenger of Allah (ﷺ) said: "Do you not know that last night certain Ayat were revealed the like of which there is no precedence. They are: 'Say: I seek refuge with (Allah) the Rubb of the daybreak' (Al-Falaq), and 'Say: I seek refuge with (Allah) the Rubb of mankind' (Surah 114)."
- It is narrated from Muhammad that whoever recites this Surah in the month of Ramadhan in any of his prayers, it is as if he has fasted in Makkah and he will get the reward for performing Hajj and ‘Umra.
- Imam Muhammad al-Baqir said that in the prayer of Shafa’a (in Salaatul-layl) one should recite Surah al-Falaq in the first rak’aat and an-Naas in the second.

== See also ==
- Four Quls
