= Al-Nas =

114th and final chapter of the Qur'an

Surah 114 of the Quran
سُورَةُ النَّاسِ An-Nas The Mankind
- Qira'ah; English text
- Classification: Meccan
- Other names: The People
- Position: Juzʼ 30
- Hizb no.: 60
- No. of verses: 6
- No. of Rukus: 1
- No. of Sajdahs: None
- No. of words: 20
- No. of letters: 80

Al-Nas
Recitation of Al-Nas in mujawwad.

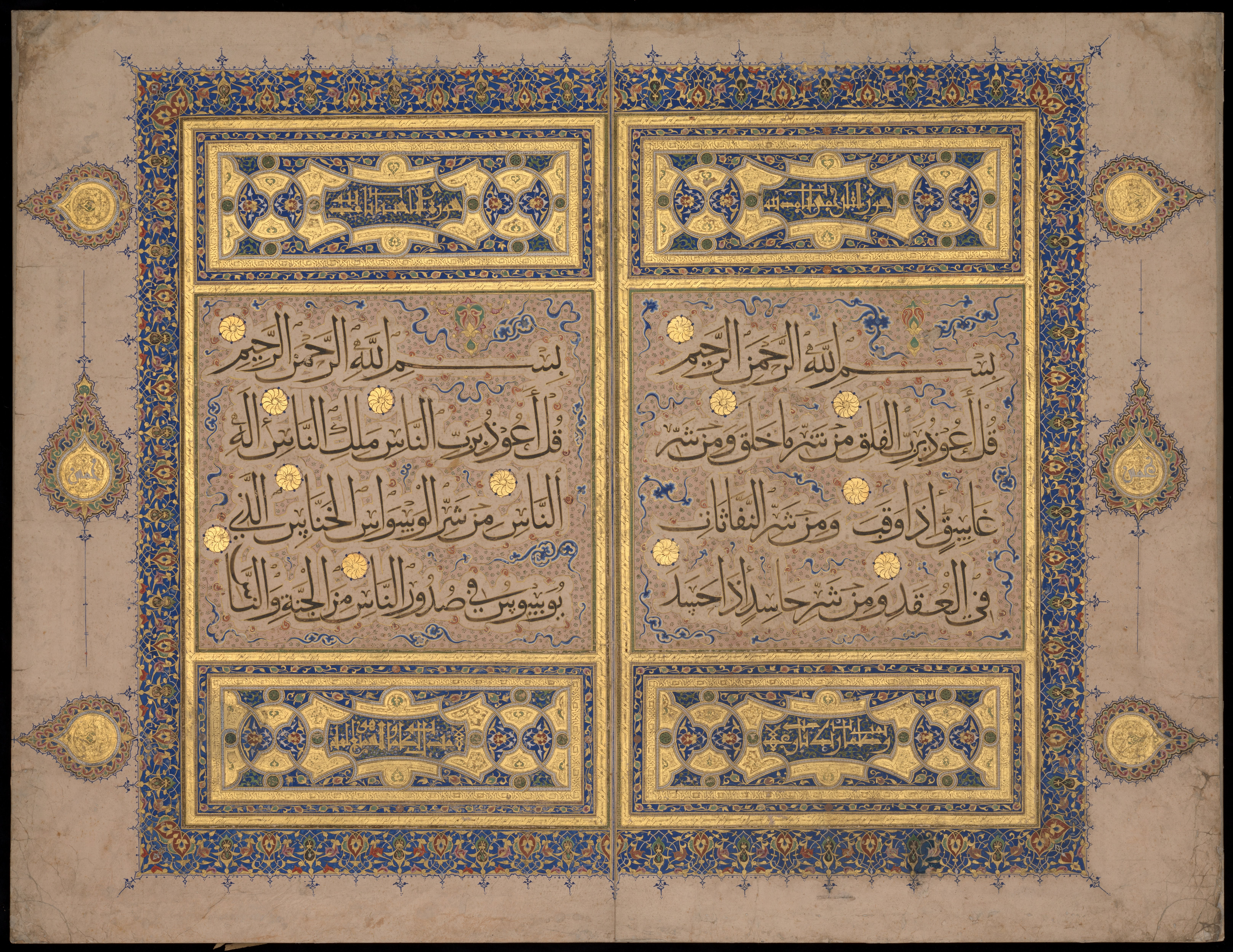
Closing pages from a Mamluk Qur'an with chapter 113 and 114 in muhaqqaq script. Cairo, c. 1360-1380. Chester Beatty Library

An-Nas or Mankind (Arabic: ٱلنَّاس, romanized: an-nās, sometimes referred to as al-Nas) is the 114th and last chapter (sūrah) of the Qur'an. It is a short six-verse invocation.

The chapter takes its name from the word "people" or "mankind" (al-nas), which recurs throughout the chapter. This and the preceding chapter, Al-Falaq ("Daybreak"), are known Al-Mu'awwidhatayn ("the Refuges"): dealing with roughly the same theme, they form a natural pair.

Regarding the timing and contextual background of the believed revelation (asbāb al-nuzūl), it is an earlier Meccan surah, which indicates a revelation in Mecca rather than Medina. Early Muslims were persecuted in Mecca when Muhammed began preaching there, but gained power and protection while in Medina, where Muhammad became a leader.

There is a Sunnah tradition of reading this chapter for the sick or before sleeping.

== Verses and translations ==
بِسْمِ ٱللَّهِ ٱلرَّحْمَـٰنِ ٱلرَّحِيمِ ۝
Bismi l-lāhi r-raḥmāni r-raḥīm(i)

In the name of God — the Most Compassionate, Most Merciful.

قُلْ أَعُوذُ بِرَبِّ ٱلنَّاسِ ۝١
^{1} Qul ʾaʿūdhu birabbi n-nās(i)

Say, ˹O Prophet,˺ “I seek refuge in the Lord of humankind,

مَلِكِ ٱلنَّاسِ ۝٢
^{2} Maliki n-nās(i)

the Master of humankind,

إِلَـٰهِ ٱلنَّاسِ ۝٣
^{3} ʾilāhi n-nās(i)

the God of humankind

,
مِن شَرِّ ٱلْوَسْوَاسِ ٱلْخَنَّاسِ ۝٤
^{4} Min sharri l-waswāsi l-khannās(i)

from the evil of the lurking whisperer —

ٱلَّذِى يُوَسْوِسُ فِى صُدُورِ ٱلنَّاسِ ۝٥
^{5} alladhī yuwaswisu fī ṣudūri n-nās(i)

who whispers into the hearts of humankind —

مِنَ ٱلْجِنَّةِ وَٱلنَّاسِ ۝٦
^{6} Mina l-jinnati wannās(i)

from among the jinn and humankind.”

- Warsh from Nafi‘ al-Madani

بِسمِ اِللهِ اِلرَّحمَـٰنِ اِلرَّحِيمِ ۝
Bismi l-lāhi r-raḥmāni r-raḥīm(i)
قُلَ اَعُوذُ بِرَبِّ اِلنَّاسِ ۝١
^{1} Qula ʿūdhu birabbi n-nās(i)
مَلِكِ اِلنَّاسِ ۝٢
^{2} Maliki n-nās(i)
إِلَـٰهِ اِلنَّاسِ ۝٣
^{3} ʾilāhi n-nās(i)
مِن شَرِّ اِلوَسوَاسِ اِلخَنَّاسِ ۝٤
^{4} Min sharri l-waswāsi l-khannās(i)
الَّذِے يُوَسوِسُ فِے صُدُورِ اِلنَّاسِ ۝٥
^{5} alladhī yuwaswisu fī ṣudūri n-nās(i)
مِنَ اَلجِنَّةِ وَالنَّاسِ ^{ص}۝٦
^{6} Mina l-jinnati wannās(i)

Translation: Noble Quran, 1999

^{1} Say, “I seek refuge in the Lord of mankind,
^{2} The Sovereign of mankind,
^{3} The God of mankind,
^{4} From the evil of the retreating whisperer –
^{5} Who whispers [evil] into the breasts of mankind –
^{6} From among the jinn and mankind.”

Translation: Saheeh International, 1997

^{1} Say: “I seek refuge with the Lord and Cherisher of mankind,
^{2} The King (or Ruler) of mankind,
^{3} The God (or Judge) of mankind, -
^{4} From the mischief of the Whisperer (of evil), who withdraws (after his whisper), -
^{5} (The same) who whispers into the hearts of mankind, -
^{6} Among jinns and among men.”

Translation: Yusuf Ali, 1934

^{1} Say: “I seek refuge in the Lord of mankind,
^{2} The King of mankind,
^{3} The God of mankind,
^{4} From the evil of the sneaking whisperer,
^{5} Who whispereth in the hearts of mankind,
^{6} Of the jinn and of mankind.”

Translation: Pickthall, 1930

== Impacts of the sūrah on a Muslim's life ==
According to 14th century exegesis of Ibn Kathir (tafsir), it has been reported from Abu Sa'id that: Prophet Muhammad used to seek protection from the evil eyes of the jinn and humankind. But when the Muawwidhatayn were revealed, he used them (for protection) and abandoned all else besides them. Al-Tirmidhi, An-Nisai and ibn Majah recorded this.
