= Al-Aḥad =

One of the names of God in Islam

al-Aḥad or Aḥad (Arabic: الأحد) is one of the names of God (Arabic: Allah) according to Islam, meaning "The One". This name means that God, in Islam, is the one who is singled out in all aspects of perfection and that nothing else shares perfectness with him. Moreover, the name is seen by the Muslims to be a direction for them to worship him alone and associate with no partners, as he is seen as the only one who has all the perfect attributes.

== Bilal ibn Rabah and Al-Aḥad ==
Bilal ibn Rabah was a companion of the prophet of Islam, Muhammad; he was an enslaved black man and was persecuted in Mecca before it was under Islamic rule by his slave owner. The slave owner tortured him because he converted to Islam. Bilal's slave owner asked him to leave his religion and that he would stop touting him as soon as he did so. Instead of leaving Islam, Bilal kept on calling on God and saying: "Ahad, Ahad" while being tortured. This story of Bilal shows the significance of God's name, al-Aḥad, since the beginning of Islam for the Muslim creed.

== Mention in the Quran ==
God's name, Al-Aḥad, was mentioned only once in the Quran in the first verse of chapter 112.

﴿قُلْ هُوَ اللَّهُ أَحَدٌ ﴾

English: Say, "He is Allāh, [who is] One,
(Quran: Quran (Saheeh International))

== See also ==
- 99 Names of God
- Abd al-Ahad, an Arabic Muslim theophoric name which means "servant of the only One".
- Bilal ibn Rabah
