= Dhikr =

Remembrance of God in Islam

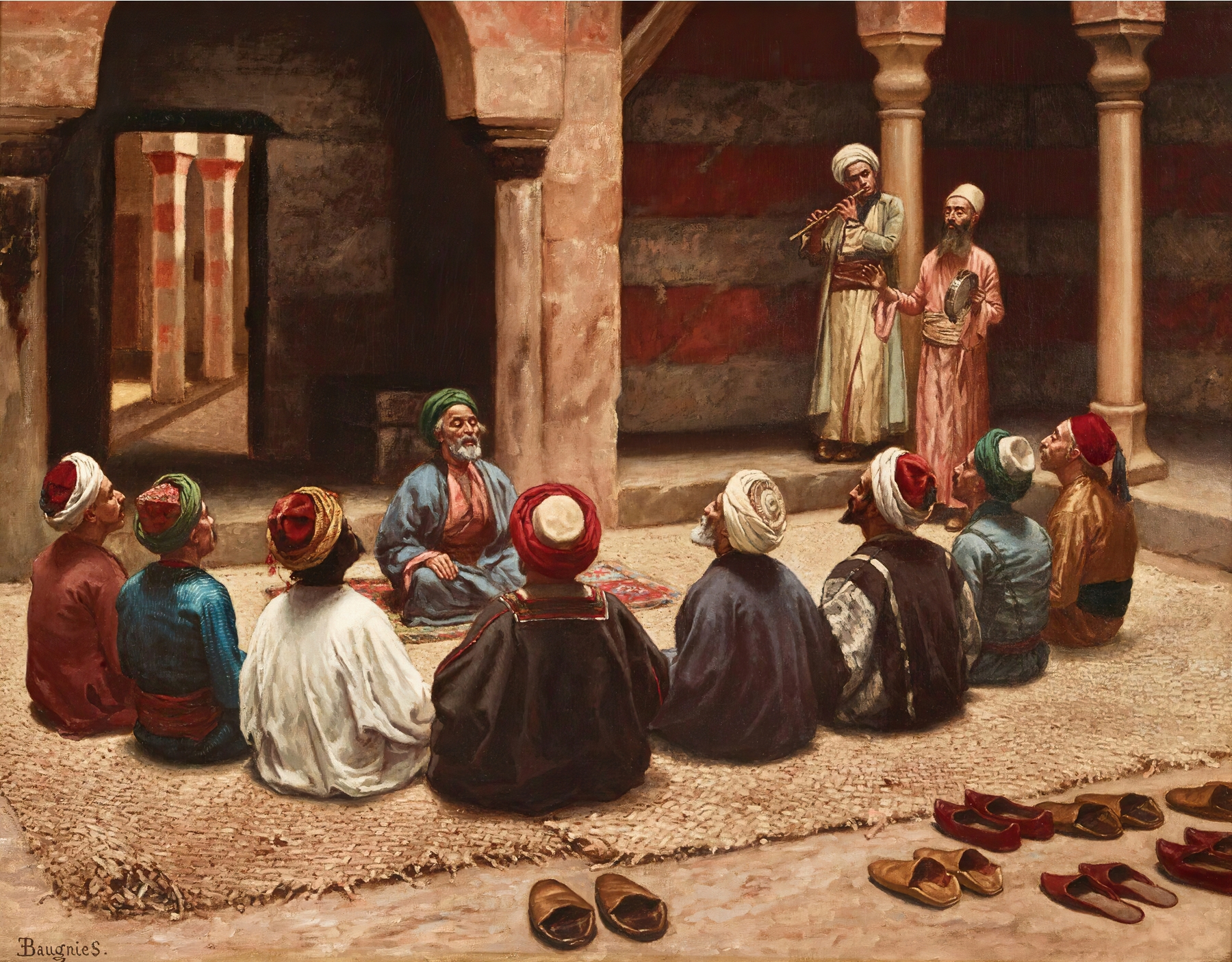
The Dhikr, Eugène Baugnies (1841–1891)

Dhikr (Arabic: ذِكْر; (Note: Also spelled thikr, zikr, zekr, and zikar.) Arabic pronunciation: [ðikr]; lit. 'remembrance, reminder, mention') is a form of Islamic worship in which phrases or prayers are repeatedly recited for the purpose of remembering God. It plays a central role in Sufism, and each Sufi order typically adopts a specific dhikr, accompanied by specific posture, breathing, and movement. In Sufism, dhikr refers to both the act of this remembrance as well as the prayers used in these acts of remembrance. Dhikr usually includes the names of God or supplication from the Quran or hadith. It may be counted with either one's fingers or prayer beads, and may be performed alone or with a collective group. A person who recites dhikr is called a dhākir (ذَاكِر; [ðaːkɪr]; lit. 'rememberer').

The Quran frequently refers to itself and other scriptures and prophetic messages as "reminders" (dhikrah, tadhkīrah), which is understood as a call to "remember" (dhikr) an innate knowledge of God humans already possess. The Quran uses the term dhikr to denote the reminder from God conveyed through the prophets and messengers, as well as the human response to that reminder, signifying a reciprocal interaction between the divine and human. Muslims believe the prophets deliver God's message as a reminder to humans, who, in turn, should remember and acknowledge it.

== Importance ==
Several verses in the Quran emphasize the importance of remembering the will of God by saying phrases such as "God willing" "God knows best," and "If it is your will.' This is the basis for dhikr. Surah al-Kahf (18), Ayah 24 states a person who forgets to say, "God willing", should immediately remember God by saying, "Maybe my Lord will guide me to [something] more akin to rectitude than this." Other verses include Surah al-Ahzab (33), Ayah 41, "O you who have faith! Remember Allah with frequent remembrance", and Surah ar-Ra'd (13), Ayah 28, "those who have faith, and whose hearts find rest in the remembrance of Allah. Look! The hearts find rest in Allah's remembrance!"

Sufi dhikr most commonly involves the repetition of the Names of Allah. This practice is central to Sufi spiritual exercises and is intended to foster a deeper connection with the Divine. The Names of Allah, also known as Asma'ul Husna, represent various attributes of God, such as "Ar-Rahman" (The Most Merciful) and "Al-Karim" (The Generous). By invoking these names, practitioners aim to internalize the qualities they represent, cultivate a state of spiritual purity, and draw closer to God. The repetitive nature of dhikr helps to quiet the mind, focus the heart, and create a sense of inner peace and presence. To Sufis, dhikr is seen as a way to gain spiritual enlightenment and achieve annihilation of self (fana) to seek permanence in God. All Muslim sects endorse individual rosaries as a method dhikr and meditation, the goal of which is to obtain a feeling of peace, separation from worldly values (dunya), and, in general, strengthen Iman (faith). The main purpose of dhikr is to fill the heart with spiritual meaning and not simply chant the invocations with an empty heart and absent mind. When performed with awareness, the heart then becomes receptive to the activity of the tongue and is aware of God's presence.

== Common types ==
Arabic Qurʾanic spelling	Transliteration IPA	Phrase
بِسْمِ ٱللَّٰهِ ٱلرَّحْمَٰنِ ٱلرَّحِيمِ	bismi -llāhi r-raḥmāni r-raḥīm^{i} /bis.mi‿l.laː.hi‌‿r.raħ.maː.ni ‿r.ra.ħiː.mi/	In the name of God, the All-Merciful, the Especially-Merciful.
أَعُوذُ بِٱللَّٰهِ مِنَ ٱلشَّيْطَانِ ٱلرَّجِيمِ	ʾaʿūḏu bi-llāhi mina š-šayṭāni r-rajīm^{i} /ʔa.ʕuː.ðu bil.laː.hi mi.na‿ʃ.ʃaj.tˤaː.ni‿r.ra.d͡ʒiː.mi/	I seek refuge in God from the exiled Satan.
أَعُوذُ بِٱللَّٰهِ ٱلسَّمِيعِ ٱلْعَلِيمِ مِنَ ٱلشَّيْطَانِ ٱلرَّجِيمِ	ʾaʿūḏu bi-llāhi s-samīʿi l-ʿalīmi mina š-šayṭāni r-rajīm^{i} /ʔa.ʕuː.ðu bil.laː.hi‿s.sa.miː.ʕi‿l.ʕa.liː.mi mi.na‿ʃ.ʃaj.tˤaː.ni‿r.ra.d͡ʒiː.mi/	I seek refuge in God, the All-Hearing, the All-Knowing, from the exiled Satan.
سُبْحَانَ ٱللَّٰهِ	subḥāna -llāh^{i} /sub.ħaː.na‿ɫ.ɫaː.hi/	Glorified is God.
ٱلْحَمْدُ لِلَّٰهِ	ʾalḥamdu lillāh^{i} /ʔal.ħam.du lil.laː.hi/	Praise is due to God.
لَا إِلَٰهَ إِلَّا ٱللَّٰهُ	lā ʾilāha ʾillā -llāh^{u} /laː ʔi.laː.ha ʔil.la‿ɫ.ɫaː.hu/	There is no deity but God.
ٱللَّٰهُ أَكْبَرُ	ʾallāhu ʾakbar^{u} /ʔaɫ.ɫaː.hu ʔak.ba.ru/	God is greater [than everything].
أَسْتَغْفِرُ ٱللَّٰهَ	ʾastaḡfiru -llāh^{a} /ʔas.taɣ.fi.ru‿ɫ.ɫaː.ha/	I seek the forgiveness of God.
أَسْتَغْفِرُ ٱللَّٰهَ رَبِّي وَأَتُوبُ إِلَيْهِ	ʾastaḡfiru -llāha rabbī wa-ʾatūbu ʾilayh^{i} /ʔas.taɣ.fi.ru‿ɫ.ɫaː.ha rab.biː wa.ʔa.tuː.bu ʔi.laj.hi/	I seek the forgiveness of God, my Lord, and repent to Him.
سُبْحَانَكَ ٱللَّٰهُمَّ	subḥānaka -llāhumm^{a} /sub.ħaː.na.ka‿ɫ.ɫaː.hum.ma/	Glorified are you, O God.
سُبْحَانَ ٱللَّٰهِ وَبِحَمْدِهِ	subḥāna -llāhi wa-bi-ḥamdih^{ī} /sub.ħaː.na‿ɫ.ɫaː.hi wa.bi.ħam.di.hiː/	Glorified is God and with His praise.
سُبْحَانَ رَبِّيَ ٱلْعَظِيمِ وَبِحَمْدِهِ	subḥāna rabbiya l-ʿaẓīmi wa-bi-ḥamdih^{ī} /sub.ħaː.na rab.bi.ja‿l.ʕa.ðˤiː.mi wa.bi.ħam.di.hiː/	Glorified is my God, the Great, and with His praise.
سُبْحَانَ رَبِّيَ ٱلْأَعْلَىٰ وَبِحَمْدِهِ	subḥāna rabbiya l-ʾaʿlā wa-bi-ḥamdih^{ī} /sub.ħaː.na rab.bi.ja‿l.ʔaʕ.laː wa.bi.ħam.di.hiː/	Glorified is my God, the Most High, and with His praise.
لَا حَوْلَ وَلَا قُوَّةَ إِلَّا بِٱللَّٰهِ ٱلْعَلِيِّ ٱلْعَظِيمِ	lā ḥawla wa-lā quwwata ʾillā bi-llāhi l-ʿalīyi l-ʿaẓīm^{i} /laː ħaw.la wa.laː quw.wa.ta ʔil.laː bil.laː.hi‿l.ʕa.liː.ji‿l.ʕa.ðˤiː.mi/	There is no power no strength except from God, the Exalted, the Great.
لَا إِلَٰهَ إِلَّا أَنْتَ سُبْحَانَكَ إِنِّي كُنْتُ مِنَ ٱلظَّالِمِينَ	lā ʾilāha ʾillā ʾanta subḥānaka ʾinnī kuntu mina ẓ-ẓālimīn^{a} /laː ʔi.laː.ha ʔil.laː ʔan.ta sub.ħaː.na.ka ʔin.niː kun.tu mi.na‿ðˤ.ðˤaː.li.miː.na/	There is no god except You, glorified are you! I have indeed been among the wrongdoers.
حَسْبُنَا ٱللَّٰهُ وَنِعْمَ ٱلْوَكِيلُ	ḥasbunā -llāhu wa-niʿma l-wakīl^{u} /ħas.bu.na‿ɫ.ɫaː.hu wa.niʕ.ma‿l.wa.kiː.lu/	God is sufficient for us, and He is an excellent Trustee.
إِنَّا لِلَّٰهِ وَإِنَّا إِلَيْهِ رَاجِعُونَ	ʾinnā lillāhi wa-ʾinnā ʾilayhi rājiʿūn^{a} /ʔin.naː lil.laː.hi wa.ʔin.naː ʔi.laj.hi raː.d͡ʒi.ʕuː.na/	Verily we belong to God, and verily to Him do we return.
مَا شَاءَ ٱللَّٰهُ كَانَ وَمَا لَمْ يَشَأْ لَمْ يَكُنْ	mā šāʾa -llāhu kāna wa-mā lam yašaʾ lam yakun /maː ʃaː.ʔa‿ɫ.ɫaː.hu kaː.na wa.maː lam ja.ʃaʔ lam ja.kun/	What God wills will be, and what God does not will, will not be.
إِنْ شَاءَ ٱللَّٰهُ	ʾin šāʾa -llāh^{u} /ʔin ʃaː.ʔa‿ɫ.ɫaː.hu/	If God wills.
مَا شَاءَ ٱللَّٰهُ	mā šāʾa -llāh^{u} /maː ʃaː.ʔa‿ɫ.ɫaː.hu/	What God wills.
بِإِذْنِ ٱللَّٰهِ	bi-ʾiḏni -llāh^{i} /bi.ʔið.ni‿l.laː.hi/	With the permission of God.
جَزَاكَ ٱللَّٰهُ خَيْرًا	jazāka -llāhu khayrā^{n} /d͡ʒa.zaː.ka‿ɫ.ɫaː.hu xaj.ran/	God reward you [with] goodness.
بَارَكَ ٱللَّٰهُ فِيكَ	bāraka -llāhu fīk^{a} /baː.ra.ka‿ɫ.ɫaː.hu fiː.ka/	God bless you.
فِي سَبِيلِ ٱللَّٰهِ	fī sabīli -llāh^{i} /fiː sa.biː.li‿l.laː.hi/	On the path of God.
لَا إِلَٰهَ إِلَّا ٱللَّٰهُ مُحَمَّدٌ رَسُولُ ٱللَّٰهِ	lā ʾilāha ʾillā -llāhu muḥammadun rasūlu -llāh^{i} /laː ʔi.laː.ha ʔil.la‿ɫ.ɫaː.hu mu.ħam.ma.dun ra.suː.lu‿ɫ.ɫaː.hi/	There is no deity but God, Muhammad is the messenger of God.
لَا إِلَٰهَ إِلَّا ٱللَّٰهُ مُحَمَّدٌ رَسُولُ ٱللَّٰهِ عَلِيٌّ وَلِيُّ ٱللَّٰهِ	lā ʾilāha ʾillā -llāhu muḥammadun rasūlu -llāhi ʿalīyun walīyu -llāh^{i} /laː ʔi.laː.ha ʔil.la‿ɫ.ɫaː.hu mu.ħam.ma.dun ra.suː.lu‿ɫ.ɫaː.hi ʕa.liː.jun wa.liː.ju‿ɫ.ɫaː.hi/	There is no deity but God, Muhammad is the messenger of God, Ali is the vicegerent of God. (Usually recited by Shia Muslims)
أَشْهَدُ أَنْ لَا إِلَٰهَ إِلَّا ٱللَّٰهُ وَأَشْهَدُ أَنَّ مُحَمَّدًا رَسُولُ ٱللَّٰهِ	ʾašhadu ʾan lā ʾilāha ʾillā -llāhu wa-ʾašhadu ʾanna muḥammadan rasūlu -llāh^{i} /ʔaʃ.ha.du ʔan laː ʔi.laː.ha ʔil.la‿ɫ.ɫaː.hu wa.ʔaʃ.ha.du ʔan.na mu.ħam.ma.dan ra.suː.lu‿ɫ.ɫaː.hi/	I bear witness that there is no deity but God, and I bear witness that Muhammad is the messenger of God.
أَشْهَدُ أَنْ لَا إِلَٰهَ إِلَّا ٱللَّٰهُ وَأَشْهَدُ أَنَّ مُحَمَّدًا رَسُولُ ٱللَّٰهِ وَأَشْهَدُ أَنَّ عَلِيًّا وَلِيُّ ٱللَّٰهِ	ʾašhadu ʾan lā ʾilāha ʾillā -llāhu wa-ʾašhadu ʾanna muḥammadan rasūlu -llāhi wa-ʾašhadu ʾanna ʿalīyan walīyu -llāh^{i} /ʔaʃ.ha.du ʔan laː ʔi.laː.ha ʔil.la‿ɫ.ɫaː.hu wa.ʔaʃ.ha.du ʔan.na mu.ħam.ma.dan ra.suː.lu‿ɫ.ɫaː.hi wa.ʔaʃ.ha.du ʔan.na ʕa.liː.jan wa.liː.ju‿ɫ.ɫaː.hi/	I bear witness that there is no deity but God, and I bear witness that Muhammad is the messenger of God, and I bear witness that Ali is the vicegerent of God. (Usually recited by Shia Muslims)
ٱللَّٰهُمَّ صَلِّ عَلَىٰ مُحَمَّدٍ وَآلِ مُحَمَّدٍ	ʾallāhumma ṣalli ʿalā muḥammadin wa-ʾāli muḥammad^{in} /ʔaɫ.ɫaː.hum.ma sˤal.li ʕa.laː mu.ħam.ma.din wa.ʔaː.li mu.ħam.ma.din/	O God, bless Muhammad and the Progeny of Muhammad.
ٱللَّٰهُمَّ صَلِّ عَلَىٰ مُحَمَّدٍ وَآلِ مُحَمَّدٍ وَعَجِّلْ فَرَجَهُمْ وَٱلْعَنْ أَعْدَاءَهُمْ	ʾallāhumma ṣalli ʿalā muḥammadin wa-ʾāli muḥammadin wa-ʿajjil farajahum wa-lʿan ʾaʿdāʾahum /ʔaɫ.ɫaː.hum.ma sˤal.li ʕa.laː mu.ħam.ma.din wa.ʔaː.li mu.ħam.ma.din wa.ʕad͡ʒ.d͡ʒil fa.ra.d͡ʒa.hum wal.ʕan ʔaʕ.daː.ʔa.hum/	O God, bless Muhammad and the Progeny of Muhammad, and hasten their alleviation and curse their enemies. (Usually recited by Shia Muslims)
ٱللَّٰهُمَّ عَجِّلْ لِوَلِيِّكَ ٱلْفَرَجَ وَٱلْعَافِيَةَ وَٱلنَّصْرَ	ʾallāhumma ʿajjil li-walīyika l-faraja wa-l-ʿāfiyata wa-n-naṣr^{a} /ʔaɫ.ɫaː.hum.ma ʕad͡ʒ.d͡ʒil li.wa.liː.ji.ka‿l.fa.ra.d͡ʒa wal.ʕaː.fi.ja.ta wan.nasˤ.ra/	O God, hasten the alleviation of your vicegerent (i.e. Imam Mahdi), and grant him vitality and victory. (Usually recited by Shia Muslims)

== Phrases and expressions ==
There are numerous conventional phrases and expressions invoking God.

Name	Phrase	Citation (Quran or Sunnah)
Takbir تَكْبِير
Takbir تَكْبِير	allāhu ʾakbar^{u}	9:72, 29:45, 40:10
Takbir تَكْبِير	ٱللَّٰهُ أَكْبَرُ	9:72, 29:45, 40:10
Takbir تَكْبِير	God is greater [than all things]	9:72, 29:45, 40:10
Tasbih تَسْبِيح
Tasbih تَسْبِيح	subḥāna llāh^{i}	23:91, 28:68, 37:159, 52:43, 59:23
Tasbih تَسْبِيح	سُبْحَانَ ٱللَّٰهِ	23:91, 28:68, 37:159, 52:43, 59:23
Tasbih تَسْبِيح	Glory to God	23:91, 28:68, 37:159, 52:43, 59:23
Tahmid تَحْمِيد
Tahmid تَحْمِيد	al-ḥamdu li-llāh^{i}	1:2, 6:1, 6:45, 7:43, 10:10, 14:39, 16:75, 17:111, 18:1, 23:28, 27:15, 27:59, 27:93, 29:63, 31:25, 34:1, 35:1, 35:34, 37:182, 39:29, 39:74, 39:75, 40:65
Tahmid تَحْمِيد	ٱلْحَمْدُ لِلَّٰهِ	1:2, 6:1, 6:45, 7:43, 10:10, 14:39, 16:75, 17:111, 18:1, 23:28, 27:15, 27:59, 27:93, 29:63, 31:25, 34:1, 35:1, 35:34, 37:182, 39:29, 39:74, 39:75, 40:65
Tahmid تَحْمِيد	Praise be to God	1:2, 6:1, 6:45, 7:43, 10:10, 14:39, 16:75, 17:111, 18:1, 23:28, 27:15, 27:59, 27:93, 29:63, 31:25, 34:1, 35:1, 35:34, 37:182, 39:29, 39:74, 39:75, 40:65
Tahlil تَهْلِيل
Tahlil تَهْلِيل	lā ʾilāha ʾillā llāh^{u}	37:38, 47:19
Tahlil تَهْلِيل	لَا إِلَٰهَ إِلَّا ٱللَّٰهُ	37:38, 47:19
Tahlil تَهْلِيل	There is no deity but God	37:38, 47:19
Shahadatayn شَهَادَتَيْن
Shahadatayn شَهَادَتَيْن	muḥammadun rasūlu llāh^{i}	48:29
Shahadatayn شَهَادَتَيْن	مُحَمَّدٌ رَسُولُ ٱللَّٰهِ	48:29
Shahadatayn شَهَادَتَيْن	Muhammad is the messenger of God	48:29
Tasmiyah تَسْمِيَّة
Tasmiyah تَسْمِيَّة	bi-smi llāhi r-raḥmāni r-raḥīm^{i}	1:1
Tasmiyah تَسْمِيَّة	بِسْمِ ٱللَّٰهِ ٱلرَّحْمَٰنِ ٱلرَّحِيمِ	1:1
Tasmiyah تَسْمِيَّة	In the name of God, the Beneficent, the Merciful	1:1
Inshallah إِنْ شَاءَ ٱللَّٰهُ
Inshallah إِنْ شَاءَ ٱللَّٰهُ	ʾin shāʾa llāh^{u}	2:70, 12:99, 18:69, 28:27, 48:27
Inshallah إِنْ شَاءَ ٱللَّٰهُ	إِنْ شَاءَ ٱللَّٰهُ	2:70, 12:99, 18:69, 28:27, 48:27
Inshallah إِنْ شَاءَ ٱللَّٰهُ	If God wills	2:70, 12:99, 18:69, 28:27, 48:27
Mashallah مَا شَاءَ ٱللَّٰهُ
Mashallah مَا شَاءَ ٱللَّٰهُ	mā shāʾa llāh^{u}	6:128, 7:188, 10:49, 18:39, 87:7
Mashallah مَا شَاءَ ٱللَّٰهُ	مَا شَاءَ ٱللَّٰهُ	6:128, 7:188, 10:49, 18:39, 87:7
Mashallah مَا شَاءَ ٱللَّٰهُ	What God wills	6:128, 7:188, 10:49, 18:39, 87:7
Alayhi as-Salam عَلَيْهِ ٱلسَّلَامُ
Alayhi as-Salam عَلَيْهِ ٱلسَّلَامُ	salāmu -llāhi ʿalayh^{ī}	
Alayhi as-Salam عَلَيْهِ ٱلسَّلَامُ	سَلَامُ ٱللَّٰهِ عَلَيْهِ	
Alayhi as-Salam عَلَيْهِ ٱلسَّلَامُ	Blessing of God be upon him	
Salawat صَلَوَات
Salawat صَلَوَات	ṣallā llāhu ʿalayhi wa-ʾālihī wa-sallam^{a}	
Salawat صَلَوَات	صَلَّىٰ ٱللَّٰهُ عَلَيْهِ وَآلِهِ وَسَلَّمَ	
Salawat صَلَوَات	God bless him and give him salvation	
Rahimahullah رَحِمَهُ ٱللَّٰهُ
Rahimahullah رَحِمَهُ ٱللَّٰهُ	raḥimahu llāh^{u} / raḥimaka llāh^{u}	
Rahimahullah رَحِمَهُ ٱللَّٰهُ	رَحِمَهُ ٱللَّٰهُ / رَحِمَكَ ٱللَّٰهُ	
Rahimahullah رَحِمَهُ ٱللَّٰهُ	God have mercy upon him / God have mercy upon you	
Istighfar ٱسْتِغْفَار
Istighfar ٱسْتِغْفَار	ʾastaġfiru llāh^{i}	12:98, 19:47
Istighfar ٱسْتِغْفَار	أَسْتَغْفِرُ ٱللَّٰهَ	12:98, 19:47
Istighfar ٱسْتِغْفَار	I seek forgiveness from God	12:98, 19:47
Hawqalah حَوْقَلَة
Hawqalah حَوْقَلَة	ʾlā ḥawla wa-lā quwwata ʾillā bi-llāh^{i}	Riyad as-Salihin 16:36
Hawqalah حَوْقَلَة	لَا حَوْلَ وَلَا قُوَّةَ إِلَّا بِٱللَّٰهِ	Riyad as-Salihin 16:36
Hawqalah حَوْقَلَة	There is no might nor power except in God	Riyad as-Salihin 16:36
Istirja ٱسْتِرْجَاع
Istirja ٱسْتِرْجَاع	ʾinnā li-llāhi wa-ʾinnā ʾilayhi rājiʿūn^{a}	2:156, 2:46, 2:156
Istirja ٱسْتِرْجَاع	إِنَّا لِلَّٰهِ وَإِنَّا إِلَيْهِ رَاجِعُونَ	2:156, 2:46, 2:156
Istirja ٱسْتِرْجَاع	Indeed, (we belong) to God and indeed to Him we shall return	2:156, 2:46, 2:156
Jazakallah جَزَاكَ ٱللَّٰهُ
Jazakallah جَزَاكَ ٱللَّٰهُ	jazāka llāhu ḫayran	Riyad as-Salihin 17:32, Tirmidhi 27:141, Bukhari 7:3
Jazakallah جَزَاكَ ٱللَّٰهُ	جَزَاكَ ٱللَّٰهُ خَيْرًا	Riyad as-Salihin 17:32, Tirmidhi 27:141, Bukhari 7:3
Jazakallah جَزَاكَ ٱللَّٰهُ	May God reward you well	Riyad as-Salihin 17:32, Tirmidhi 27:141, Bukhari 7:3
Karram-Allah-u Wajhahu كرم الله وجهه
Karram-Allah-u Wajhahu كرم الله وجهه	كرم الله وجهه	
Karram-Allah-u Wajhahu كرم الله وجهه	May God exalt his face	
Ta'awwudh تَعَوُّذ
Ta'awwudh تَعَوُّذ	ʾaʿūḏu bi-llāhi mina š-šayṭāni r-rajīm^{i}	Riyad as-Salihin 1:46
Ta'awwudh تَعَوُّذ	أَعُوذُ بِٱللَّٰهِ مِنَ ٱلشَّيْطَانِ ٱلرَّجِيمِ	Riyad as-Salihin 1:46
Ta'awwudh تَعَوُّذ	I seek refuge with God from the pelted Satan	Riyad as-Salihin 1:46
Fi sabilillah
Fi sabilillah	fī sabīli llāh^{i}	2:154, 2:190, 2:195, 2:218, 2:244, 2:246, etc.
Fi sabilillah	فِي سَبِيلِ ٱللَّٰهِ	2:154, 2:190, 2:195, 2:218, 2:244, 2:246, etc.
Fi sabilillah	in the cause (way) of God	2:154, 2:190, 2:195, 2:218, 2:244, 2:246, etc.
Yarhamuka-llah
Yarhamuka-llah	yarḥamuka llāh^{u}	Bukhari 78:248, Riyad as-Salihin 6:35
Yarhamuka-llah	يَرْحَمُكَ ٱللَّٰهُ	Bukhari 78:248, Riyad as-Salihin 6:35
Yarhamuka-llah	May God have mercy on you	Bukhari 78:248, Riyad as-Salihin 6:35
Honorifics often said or written alongside Allah
Subhanahu wa-Ta'ala
Subhanahu wa-Ta'ala	subḥānahu wa-taʿālā	6:100, 10:18, 16:1, 17:43, 30:40, 39:67
Subhanahu wa-Ta'ala	سُبْحَانَهُ وَتَعَالَىٰ	6:100, 10:18, 16:1, 17:43, 30:40, 39:67
Subhanahu wa-Ta'ala	Praised and exalted	6:100, 10:18, 16:1, 17:43, 30:40, 39:67
Tabaraka wa-Ta'ala
Tabaraka wa-Ta'ala	tabāraka wa-taʿālā	
Tabaraka wa-Ta'ala	تَبَارَكَ وَتَعَالَىٰ	
Tabaraka wa-Ta'ala	Blessed and exalted	
Jalla Jalalah
Jalla Jalalah	jalla jalālah^{u}	
Jalla Jalalah	جَلَّ جَلَالَهُ	
Jalla Jalalah	May His glory be glorified	
Azza wa Jall
Azza wa Jall	ʿazza wa-jall^{a}	
Azza wa Jall	عَزَّ وَجَلَّ	
Azza wa Jall	Prestigious and Majestic	

== Recitation of Quran ==
Reciting the Quran sincerely is also considered a kind of Dhikr. For example:

- Reciting Surah al-Ikhlas (112) is equal to one-third of the Quran.
- Reciting Surah al-Ikhlas (112) 10 times gives a palace in Heaven, and 20 times grants two palaces.
- Reciting Surah al-Kafirun (109) is equal to one-fourth of the Quran.
- Reciting Surah an-Nasr (110) is equal to one-fourth of the Quran.
- Reciting Surah az-Zalzalah (99) is equal to half of the Quran.

== Quranic ayat and hadiths ==
=== Quranic ayat ===
"It is truly I. I am Allah! There is no god [worthy of worship] except Me. So worship Me [alone], and establish prayer for My remembrance" — Surah Taha, Ayah 14

"O believers! Always remember Allah often" — Surah Al- Ahzab, Ayah 41

"Indeed, in the creation of the heavens and the earth and the alternation of the day and night there are signs for people of reason. [They are] those who remember Allah while standing, sitting, and lying on their sides, and reflect on the creation of the heavens and the earth [and pray], 'Our Lord! You have not created [all of] this without purpose. Glory be to You! Protect us from the torment of the Fire'" — Surah Al 'Imran, Ayat 190-191

=== Hadiths ===
Narrated by Abu Al-Darda that the Messenger of Allah said:

"Shall I tell you about the best of deeds, the most pure in the Sight of your Lord, about the one that is of the highest order and is far better for you than spending gold and silver, even better for you than meeting your enemies in the battlefield where you strike at their necks and they at yours?" The companions replied, "Yes, O Messenger of Allah!" He replied, 'Remembrance of Allah."

—Jami Al-Tirmidhi 3337

Narrated by Abu Hurairah that the Messenger of Allah said:

"People will not sit in an assembly in which they remember Allah without the angels surrounding them, mercy covering them, and Allah mentioning them among those who are with Him."

— Bulugh Al-Maram: Book 16, Hadith 1540

Narrated by Abu Hurairah that the Messenger of Allah said:

"Lo! Indeed the world is cursed. What is in it is cursed, except for remembrance of Allah, what is conducive to that, the knowledgeable person and the learning person."

—Jami Al-Tirmidhi 2322

Narrated by Abdullah bin Busr that the Messenger of Allah said:

"'Always keep your tongue moist with the remembrance of Allah, the Mighty and Sublime.'"

—Sunan Ibn Majah 3793

Narrated by Mu'adh ibn Jabal that the Messenger of Allah said:

"The People of Paradise will not regret except one thing alone: the house that passed them by and in which they made no remembrance of Allah."

—Shu'ab al-Iman: Book 1, Hadith 392

=== Tasbih of Fatimah ===
The Islamic prophet Muhammad is reported to have taught his daughter Fatimah bint Rasul Allah a special manner of Dhikr which is known as the "Tasbih of Fatimah". This consists of:

1. 33 repetitions of subḥāna -llah^{i} (سُبْحَانَ ٱللَّٰهِ), meaning "Glorified is God". This saying is known as Tasbih (تَسْبِيح).
2. 33 repetitions of al-ḥamdu lillāh^{i} (ٱلْحَمْدُ لِلَّٰهِ), meaning "All Praise belongs to God". This saying is known as Tahmid (تَحْمِيد).
3. 34 repetitions of ʾallāhu ʾakbar^{u} (ٱللَّٰهُ أَكْبَرُ), meaning "God is Greater [than everything]". This saying is known as Takbir (تَكْبِير).

The Shia way of doing the Tasbih of Fatimah is:

1. 34 repetitions of ʾallāhu ʾakbar^{u} (ٱللَّٰهُ أَكْبَرُ), meaning "God is Greater [than everything]". This saying is known as Takbir (تَكْبِير).
2. 33 repetitions of al-ḥamdu lillāh^{i} (ٱلْحَمْدُ لِلَّٰهِ), meaning "All Praise belongs to God". This saying is known as Tahmid (تَحْمِيد).
3. 33 repetitions of subḥāna -llah^{i} (سُبْحَانَ ٱللَّٰهِ), meaning "Glorified is God". This saying is known as Tasbih (تَسْبِيح).
4. Saying one time at the end: La ilaha il Allah (There is no god but Allah).

== Prayer beads ==
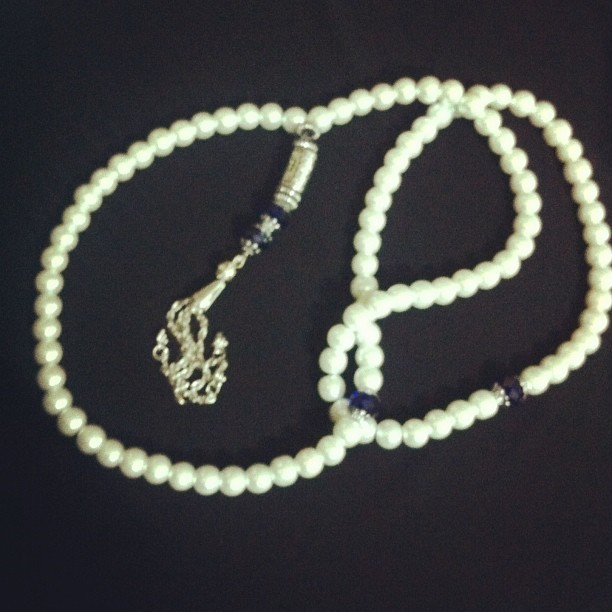
An example of a Tasbih that Muslims use to track their count for dhikr.

Like many other religions, the use of rosaries is also recommended when remembering God. Since it can get difficult to keep track of the counting of the prayers, the beads are used to keep track so that the person reciting the prayer can turn all of their focus on what is actually being said - as it can become difficult to concentrate simultaneously on the number and phrasing when one is doing so a substantial number of times. Similarly, as dhikr involves the repetition of particular phrases a specific number of times, prayer beads are used to keep track of the count.

Known also as Tasbih, these are usually Misbaha (prayer beads) upon a string, 33, 99, or 100 in number, which correspond to the names of God in Islam and other recitations. The beads are used to keep track of the number of recitations that make up the dhikr.

In the United States, Muslim inmates are allowed to utilize prayer beads for therapeutic effects. In Alameen v. Coughlin, 892 F. Supp. 440 (E.D.N.Y 1995), Imam Hamzah S. Alameen, a/k/a Gilbert Henry, and Robert Golden brought suit against Thomas A. Coughlin III, etc., et alia (Head of the Department of Corrections) in the State of New York pursuant to 42 USC Section 1983. The plaintiffs argued that prisoners have a First Amendment Constitutional right to pursue Islamic healing therapy called KASM (قاسَمَهُ | qaasama | taking an oath ) which uses prayer beads. The rosary of oaths, which Alameen developed, was used to successfully rehabilitate inmates suffering from co-occurring mental health challenges and substance abuse issues during the 1990s. All people, including Muslims and Catholics, were allowed to use prayer beads inside prisons, lest their freedom of religion be violated when the prison administration forbade their possession as contraband in the penal system.

== Dhakir ==
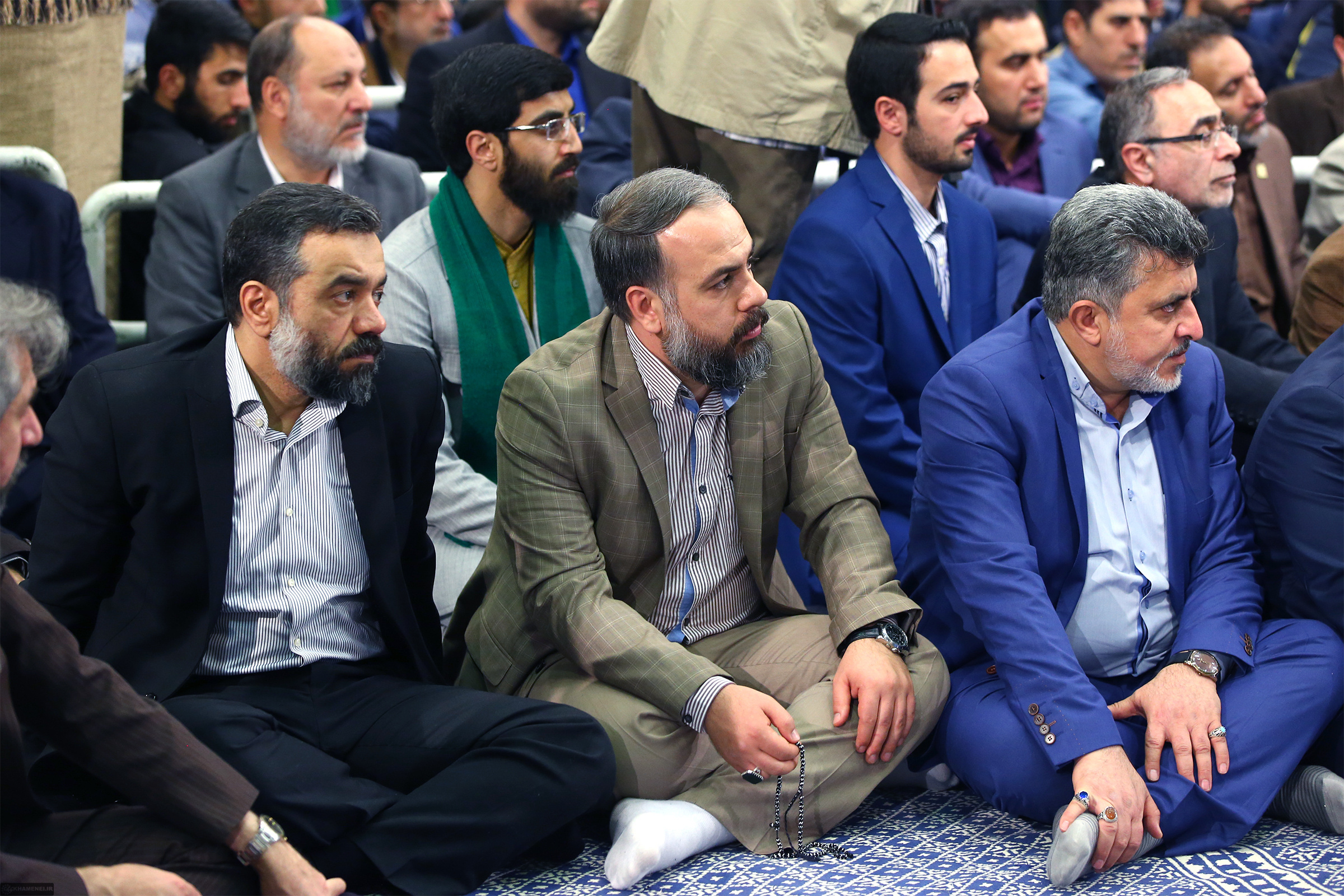
A group of Iranian Maddahs/Dhakirs, in a gathering

A "dhakir" (ذَاكِر) or "Zaker" (literally "mentioner"' a speaker who refers to something briefly/incidentally), or reminder, is considered a maddah who reminds the remembering of Allah (and His Dhikr) for people, and he himself should also be reciter of dhikhr; namely, not only he ought to be a recital of Dhikr, but also he should put the audience in the situation of dhikr reminding (of Allah and likewise Ahl al-Bayt). Idiomatically, the term means "praiser of God" or "professional narrator of the tragedies of Karbala (and Ahl al-Bayt)". To some extent, it can mean Maddah/panegyrist too.

The root of the word "Dhakir" (ذَاكِر) is "Dhikr" (ذِكْر) which means remembering/praising; and the word "Dhakiri" (ذَاكِرِيّ) is the act which is done by Dhakir, i.e. mentioning the Dhikr (of Allah, the Ahl al-Bayt, etc.) by observing its specific principles/manners.

== Sufi practice ==
Followers of Sufism have two main ways of engaging in dhikr: silent and vocal dhikr. Silent dhikr has been considered by many Sufi practitioners to be the best form of dhikr, where dhikr is done silently and in one position without moving the body. This method of dhikr allowed it to be done whenever one could, and it avoided showing off as it was privately done. Among the biggest advocates for silent dhikr was Baha' al-Dïn Naqshband, and his form of dhikr "...required the practitioners to force internal energy into different parts within the body through concentrating the mind and regulating the breath. This was to be undertaken while repeating the verbal formula that constitutes the Islamic profession of faith: 'there is no god but God, and Muhammad is the messenger of God'". Each word in the verbal statement was for a specific part of the body, such as the navel or the upper chest.

The other form of Sufi dhikr is vocal dhikr performed using the tongue and body, where showing off is not considered a primary concern. This dhikr could be done privately or within a group, and like the Naqshband dhikr, it emphasized having the verbal invocations ripple throughout the body. Similar to the Naqshband practice of dhikr, where specific words were for specific locations of the body, exists the 'four-beat' (chahar iarb) dhikr that is attributed the Kubravï master 'Alï Hamadanï.

Sufis often engage in ritualized dhikr ceremonies that have stemmed from these two types of dhikr, the details of which vary between Sufi orders or tariqah. An example of this is the initiation of an applicant, where the repetition of dhikr is a necessary component in the ceremony. Each order, or lineage within an order, has one or more forms for group dhikr, the liturgy of which may include recitation, singing, music, dance, costumes, incense, muraqaba (meditation), ecstasy, and trance. Common terms for the forms of litany employed include "hizb" (pl. "ahzab"), "wird" (pl. "awrad") and durood. An example of a popular work of litany is Dala'il al-Khayrat. Another type of group dhikr ceremony that is most commonly performed in Arab countries is called the haḍra (lit. presence). A haḍra can draw upon secular Arab genres and typically last for hours. Finally, sama` (lit. audition) is a type of group ceremony that consists mostly of recited spiritual poetry and Quranic recitation.

== Revelations and prophetic messages ==
According to William Chittick, "The Koran commonly refers to the knowledge brought by the prophets as "remembrance" (dhikr) and "reminder" (dhikra, tadhkir), terms that derive from the root dh-k-r". These terms appear more than forty times in the Quran to describe the Quran itself. For example, the Quran refers to itself as "The Wise Reminder" (al-dhikr al-ḥakīm) in 3:58, "a Reminder for the believers" (dhikra Lil mu'minin) in 7:2, and "The reminder for the worlds" (dhikra Lil 'alamin) in 6:90. The prophet Muhammad himself is described in 88:21 as a "reminder" ("So remind! thou art but a reminder"). The same terms are also used to refer to other prophetic messages such as the Torah and the Gospel. In that vein, the Jews and the Christians are thus referred to as "the people of the Reminder" (ahl al dhikr) (16:43, 21:7). The Quran justifies the sending of numerous prophets by God by stating that human beings, similar to their forefather Adam, have a propensity to forget and become heedless. The key to confronting this shortcoming is the remembrance that God conveys through his prophets. According to Islamic beliefs, prophets have the function of reminding (dhikr) people of what they already know, while humans only need to remember (dhikr) their innate knowledge of God. This knowledge is said to be present in the divine spirit that God breathed into Adam, as the Quran states that God molded Adam's clay with His own hands and blew into him His own spirit (32:9, 15:29, 38:72).

[The message of Islam] is a call for recollection, for the remembrance of a knowledge kneaded into the very substance of our being even before our coming into this world. In a famous verse that defines the relationship between human beings and God, the Quran, in referring to the pre-cosmic existence of man, states, "'Am I not your Lord?' They said: 'Yes, we bear witness'" (7:172). The "they" refers to all the children of Adam, male and female, and the "yes" confirms the affirmation of God's Oneness by us in our pre-eternal ontological reality. Men and women still bear the echo of this "yes" deep down within their souls, and the call of Islam is precisely to this primordial nature, which uttered the "yes" even before the creation of the heavens and the earth. The call of Islam, therefore, concerns, above all, the remembrance of a knowledge deeply embedded in our being, the confirmation of a knowledge that saves, hence the soteriological function of knowledge in Islam.

— William Chittick, The Essential Seyyed Hossein Nasr, 2007

The Quran also highlights that God called upon all souls to witness His lordship, so that no one can plead ignorance on the Day of Judgment: ""Lest you say on the Day of Resurrection, "As for us, we were heedless of this," or lest you say, "Our fathers associated others with God before us, and we were their offspring after them. What, wilt Thou destroy us for what the vain-doers did?"" (7:172-73).

The Quran uses the term "dhikr" to refer to both the reminder that comes from God through the prophets and the response of humans to that reminder. This word reflects a two-way communication process between the Divine and the human. The prophets deliver the message of God, which is intended to serve as a reminder to humans, and humans respond to it by remembering and acknowledging it. In addition, the Quran clarifies that "dhikr" as the human response to God's reminder is not limited to merely acknowledging the truth of tawhid (the oneness of God). Rather, the term "dhikr" also means "to mention." Thus, on the human side, "dhikr" involves not only being aware of God's presence but also expressing that awareness through language, whether spoken or unspoken. Therefore, "dhikr" encompasses both the inner state of being mindful of God and the outer expression of that mindfulness through verbal or nonverbal means.

== See also ==
- As-salamu alaykum
- Salat
- Sabr (Islamic term)
- Adhan
- Tashahhud
- Japa
