= Mashallah =

Arabic phrase to express appreciation, joy, praise, or thankfulness

Mashallah in Arabic calligraphy

Mashallah or Ma Sha Allah or Masha Allah or Ma Shaa Allah (Note: Also written Masha'Allah, Maşaallah (Turkey and Azerbaijan), Masya Allah (Malaysia, Indonesia) Mašala (Bosnia and Herzegovina), Maşeła and Maşella (Kurdistan).) (Arabic: مَا شَاءَ ٱللَّٰهُ, romanized: mā shāʾa llāhᵘ, lit. 'God has willed it' or 'as God has wished') is an Arabic phrase generally used to positively denote something of greatness or beauty and to express a feeling of awe. It is often used to convey a sense of respect and to protect against the evil eye, suggesting that the speaker is acknowledging something positive without invoking jealousy.

It is a common expression used throughout the Arabic-speaking and Muslim world, including non-Muslim Arabic speakers, especially Arabic-speaking Christians and others who refer to God by the Arabic name Allah.

== Etymology ==
The triconsonantal root of shāʾ is šīn-yāʼ-hamza 'to will', a doubly weak root. The literal English translation of Mashallah is 'God has willed it', the present perfect of 'God's will' accentuating the essential Islamic doctrine of predestination – even though Arabic only contrasts perfect (as used in this phrase) and imperfect.

The sense of the phrase is 'what God has willed has happened', and it is used to say something good has happened. Inshallah, literally 'if God wills it', is used similarly but to refer to a future event.

== Other uses ==
Mashallah can be used to congratulate someone. It is a reminder that although the person is being congratulated, ultimately God willed it. In some cultures, people may utter Mashallah in the belief that it may help protect them from jealousy, the evil eye or a jinn. The phrase has also found its way into the colloquial language of many non-Arab languages with predominantly Muslim speakers, including Indonesians, Malaysians, Persians, Kashmiris, Turks, Kurds, Bosniaks, Azerbaijanis, Somalis, Swahili, Chechens, Avars, Circassians, Bangladeshis, Tatars, Albanians, Uzbeks, Kazakhs, Turkmens, Tajiks, Afghans, Pakistanis, and Indian Muslims.

It is also used by some Christians and others in areas which were ruled by the Ottoman Empire; Serbs, Christian Albanians, Bulgarians, and Macedonians say машала ("mašala"), often in the sense of "a job well done", along with some Georgians, Armenians, Bosnian Croats, Pontic Greeks (descendants of those that came from the Pontus region), Greek Cypriots, and Sephardic Jews.

== See also ==
=== General links ===
- Glossary of Islam
- Outline of Islam
- Islamic honorifics

=== Terms ===
- Inshallah
- Tasbih
- Alhamdulillah
- Tahlil
- Takbir
- Dhikr
- As-salamu alaykum
- Salawat
- B'ezrat HaShem
- Mazel tov
- Deo volente
