= Misbaha =

Muslim prayer beads

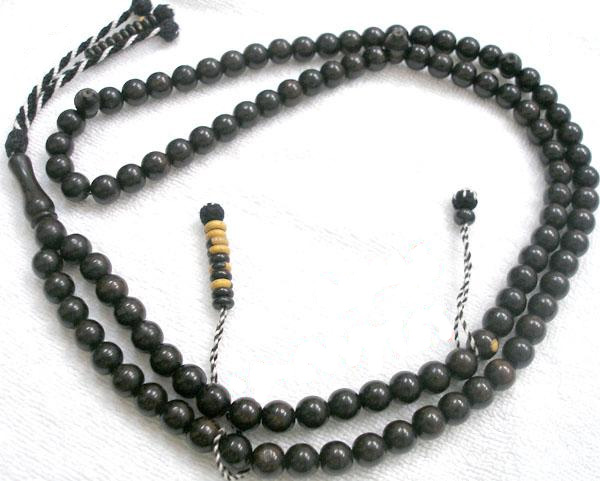
A black misbaha

A misbaha (Arabic: مِسْبَحَة, romanized: misbaḥa) is a set of prayer beads often used by Muslims for the tasbih, the recitation of prayers (the dhikr), as well as to glorify Allah. It resembles the japamala used in Hinduism, Jainism, Sikhism, and Buddhism, or the rosary used in Catholicism.

It is also known as subḥa (Arabic: سُبْحَة), misbāḥ (مِسْبَاَحْ) (Arabic, Persian and Urdu), tusbaḥ (Somali), tasbīḥ (Arabic: تَسْبِيح) (Iran, India, Afghanistan, Tajikistan, Bangladesh, Pakistan, Malaysia and Indonesia), or tespih (Turkish, Bosnian and Albanian).

== Use ==
A misbaḥah is a tool that is used as an aid to perform dhikr, including the names of God in Islam, and after regular prayer. It is often made of wooden or plastic beads, but also of olive seeds, ivory, pearls, and semi-precious stones such as carnelian, onyx, and amber.

A typical misbahah consists of three groups of beads, separated by two distinct beads (called imāms) along with one larger piece (called the yad) to serve as the handle. The exact number may vary, but they usually consist of 100 beads to assist in the glorification of God following prayers: 33 Tasbeeh (subhāna-llāh ), 33 Tahmeed (ʾal-ḥamdu li-llāh), and 34 Takbeer (ʾAllāhu ʾakbar). Some suggest the variants with 99 beads also refer to the 99 names of Allah. Smaller misbahas consist of 33 beads, in which case one cycles through them three times to complete 99. However, misbahas may also consist of 100 or 200-count beads to assist in the dhikr duties of certain Sufi orders.

It is often carried by pilgrims, dervishes, and many ordinary Muslims of all groups, however some consider it heretical innovation (bid'ah) and only allow dhikrs to be counted on the fingers. Many Shi'is use beads made from clay from Karbala, sometimes colored red in memory of the martyred Imam Husayn's blood or green in memory of his brother Hasan (who supposedly turned green from poisoning).

Misbahahs are also used culturally to reduce stress or as an indication of status in society.

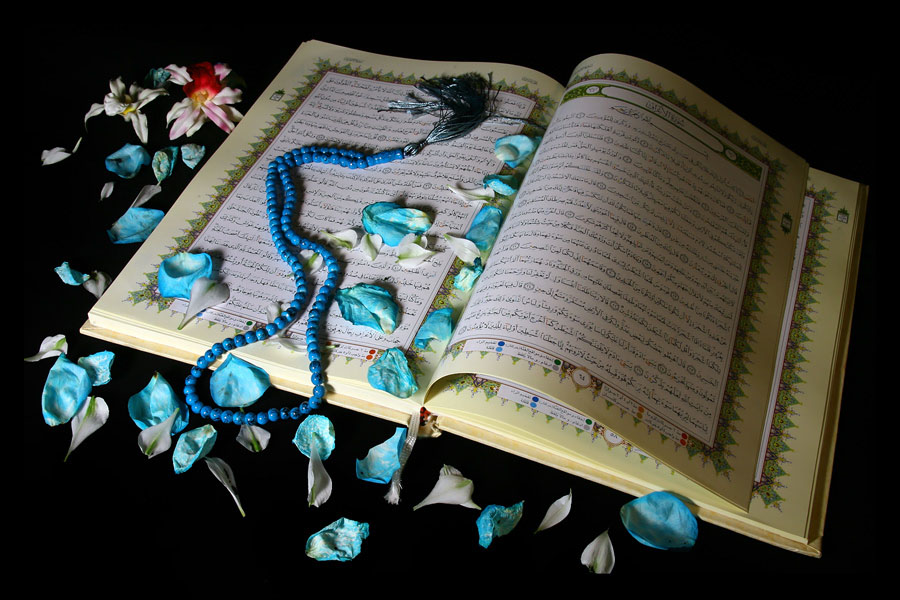
Qurʾan and Misbaha

== History ==
In the early Muslim era, prayers were counted on fingers or with pebbles.

According to the 17th-century Shia cleric ʻAllāmah Muhammad Baqir Majlisi, after the 625CE Battle of Uḥud, Fāṭimah (the daughter of Muhammad) would visit the Martyrs' graveyard every two or three days, and then made a misbaḥah of Ḥamzah ibn ʻAbd al-Muṭṭalib's grave-soil. After that, people started making and using misbaḥahs.

Some hadiths state the benefit of using the fingers of the right hand to count tasbīḥ following regular prayers.

The practice of using misbahahs most likely originated among Sufis and poor people. Opposition to the practice is known from as late as the 15th century, when al-Suyuti wrote an apologia for it.

== Misbaha of Fatima Al-Zahra ==
The Mesbaha of Fatima Al-Zahra, is recommended among Muslims, especially Shiite (Shia) sect of Islam. The Tasbih of Zahra is as follows: Allahu Akbar is recited 34 times, Alhamdulillah is recited 33 times, and Subhan Allah is recited 33 times. Muhammad ibn Abdullah taught this dhikr to his daughter (Fatima Al-Zahra).

== See also ==
- Prayer beads
  - Rosary
  - Prayer rope
  - Kombolói
  - Japamala

== Gallery ==
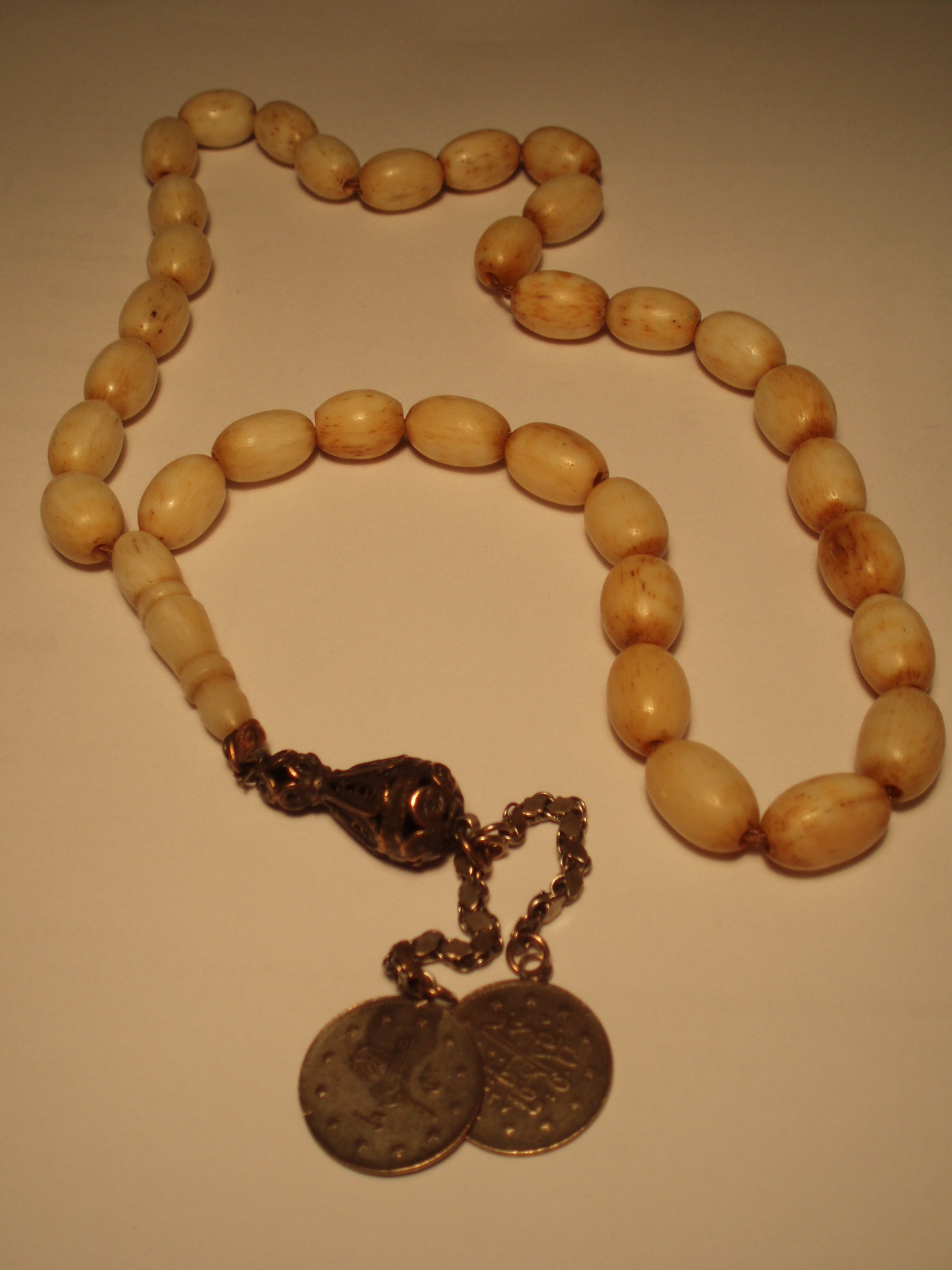
Misbaha, dated 1909 (1327 AH)

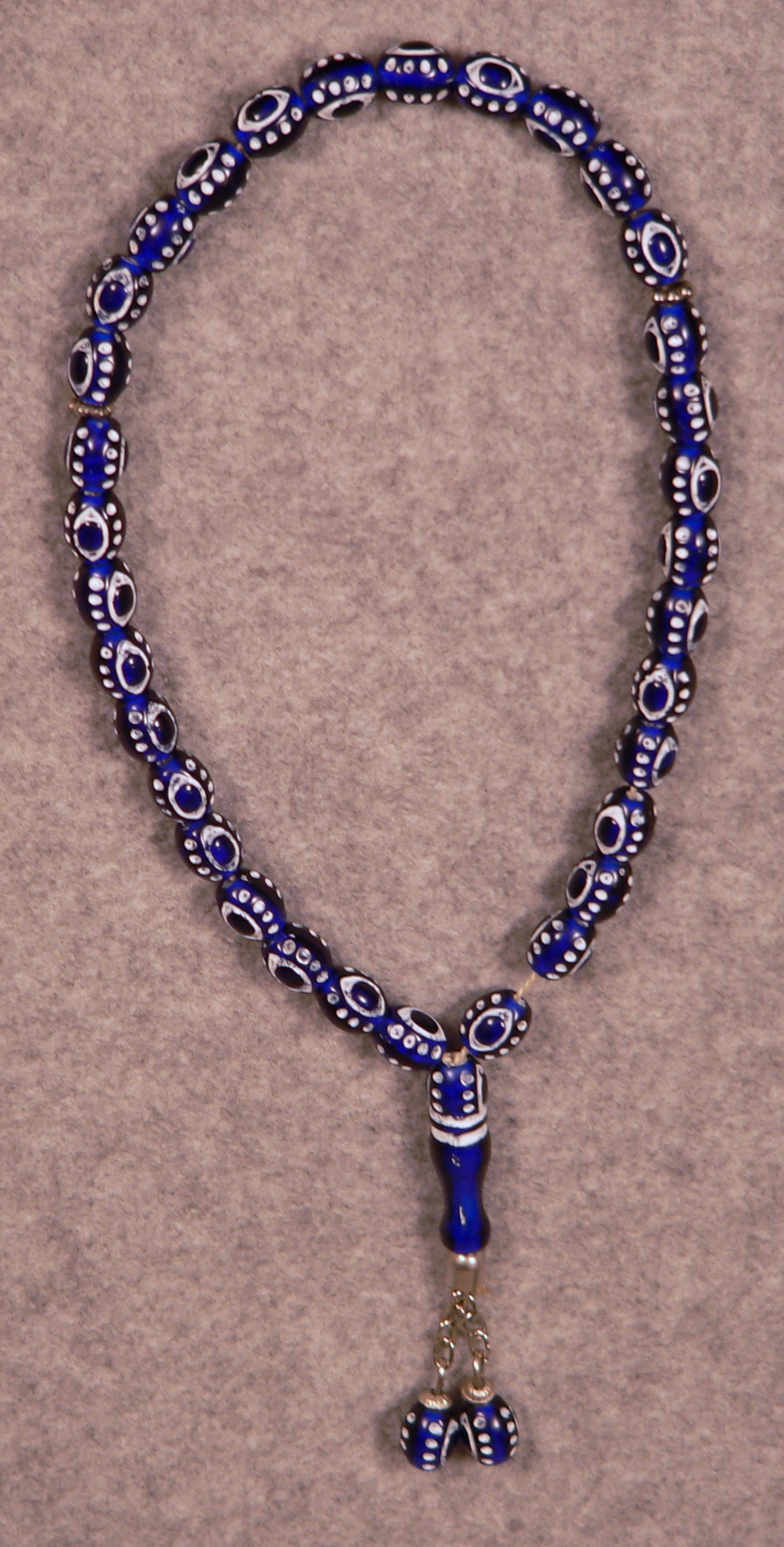
Blue Misbaha

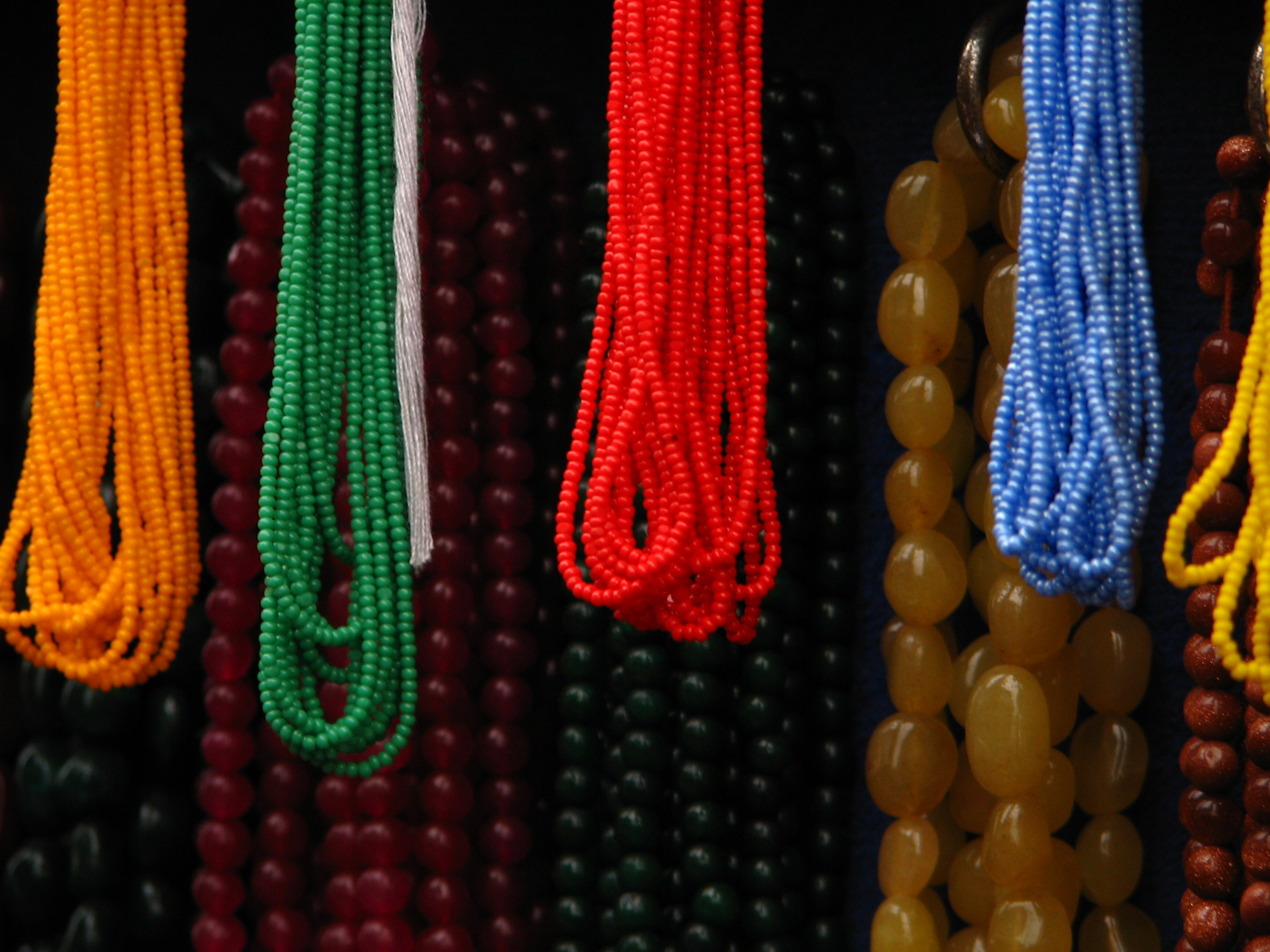
Colorful Misbaha

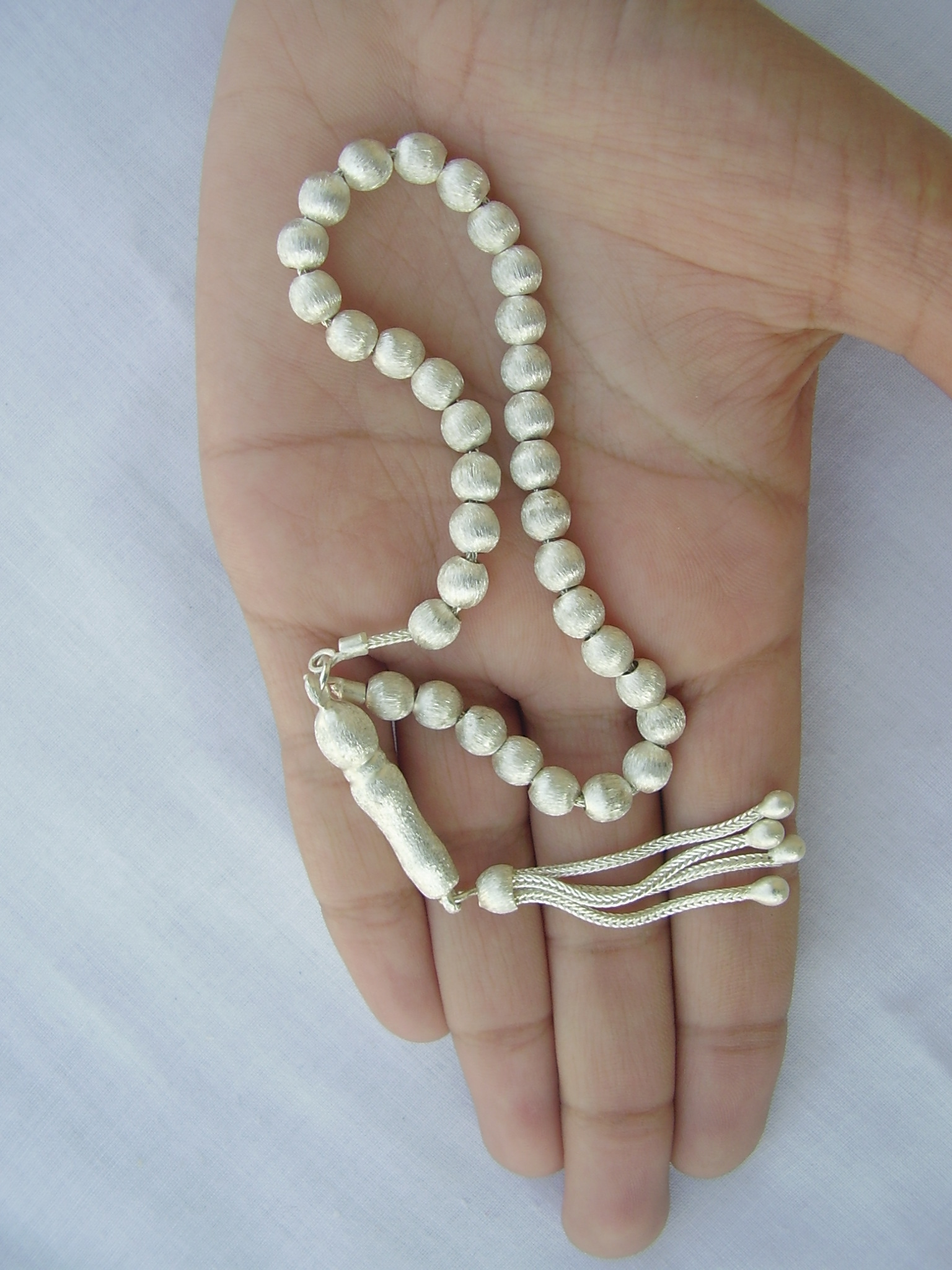
Tasbih of Silver

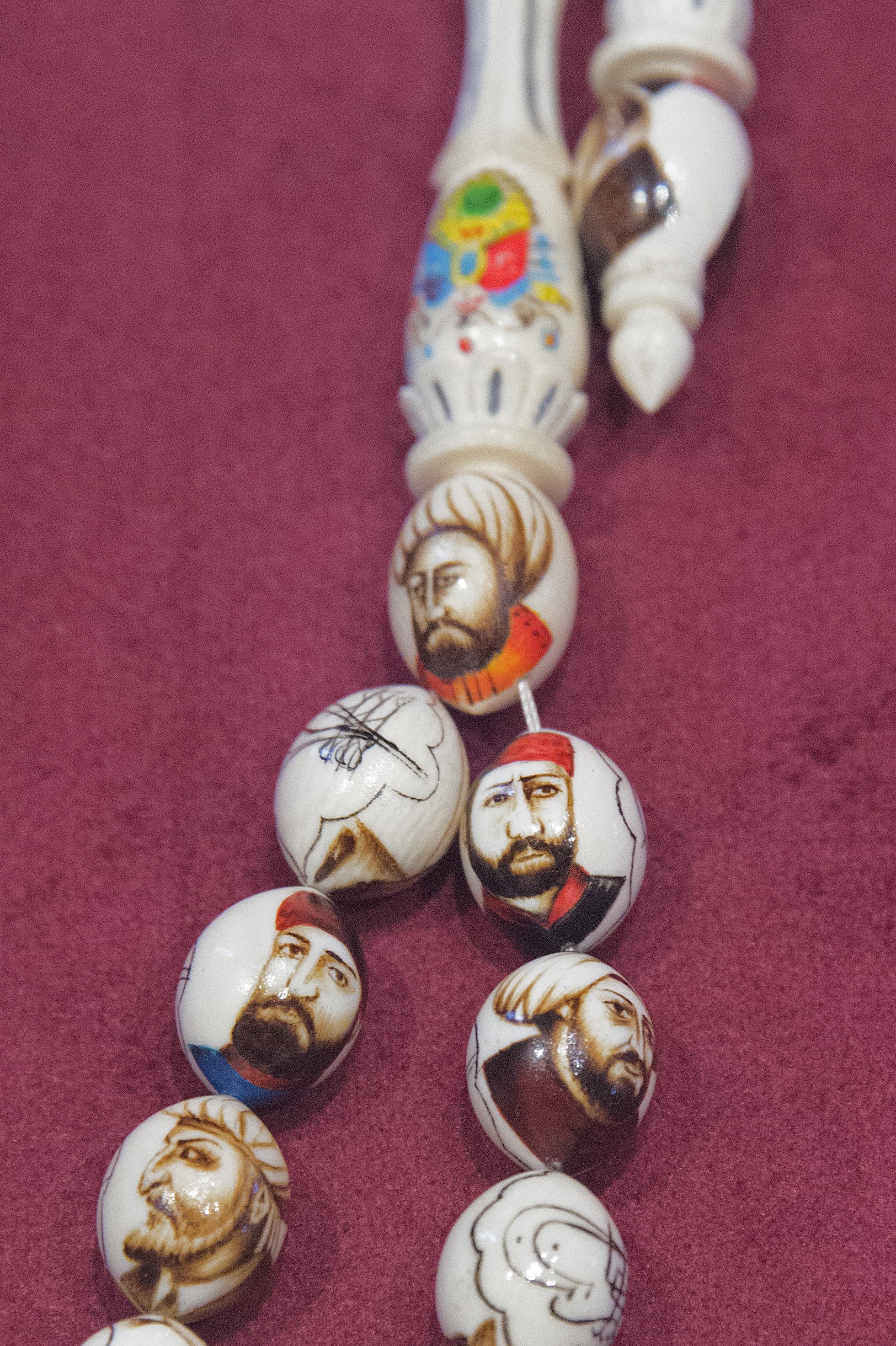
Istanbul Prayer beads museum Portrait painted beads

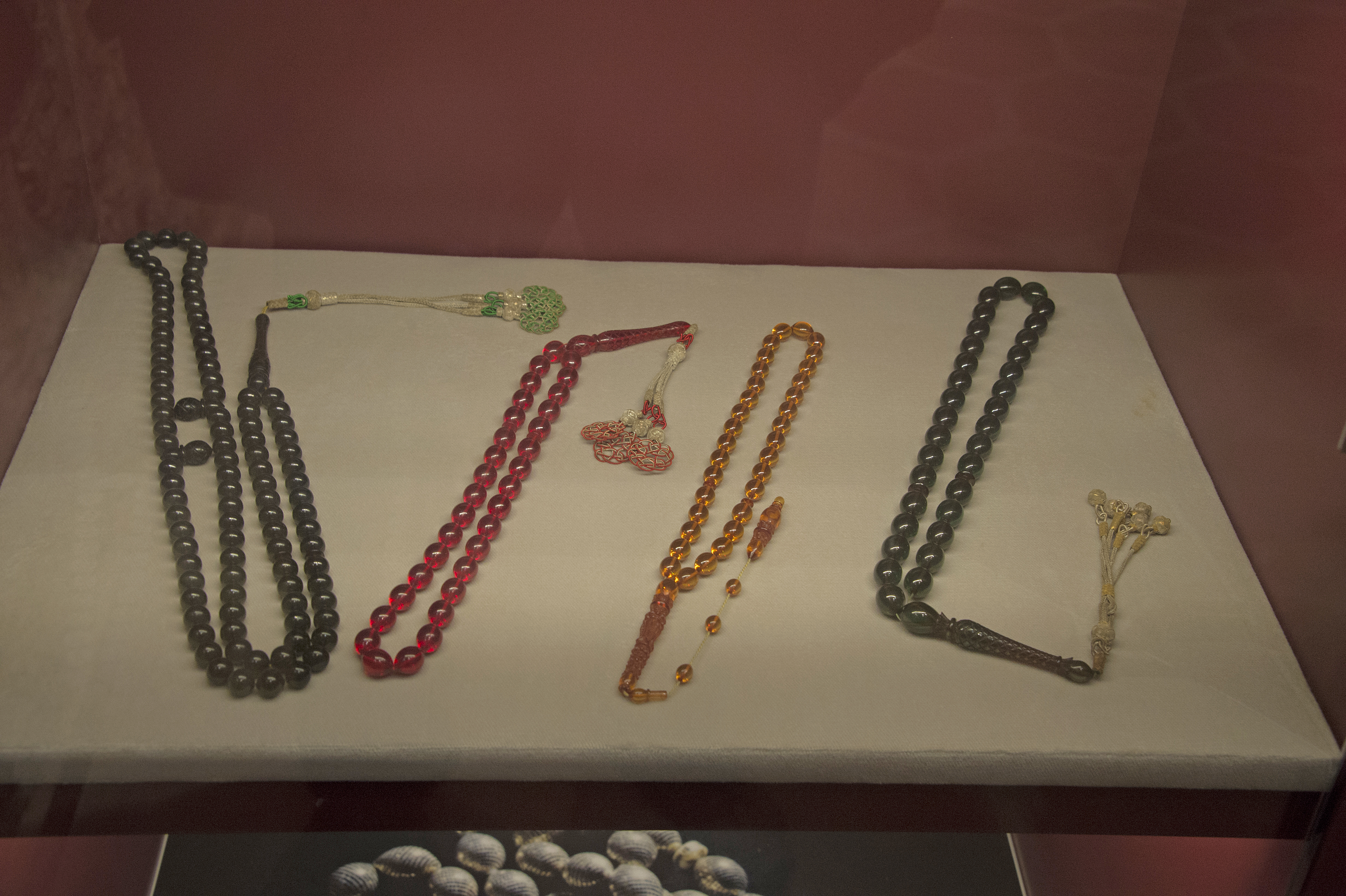
Istanbul Prayer beads museum Amberoid beads

== Bibliography ==
- Dubin, Lois Sherr (2009). "Prayer Beads". The History of Beads: From 100,000 B.C. to the Present (Rev. and expanded ed.). New York: Abrams. pp. 79–92. ISBN 9780810951747.
- Henry, Gray; Marriott, Susannah (2008). Beads of Faith: Pathways to Meditation and Spirituality Using Rosaries, Prayer Beads and Sacred Words. Louisville, Ky.: Fons Vitae. ISBN 9781887752954.
- Majlesi, Mohammad Baqer. Biḥār al-Anwār (in Arabic). Vol. 110. pp. 133, 64.
- Untracht, Oppi (2008). "Rosaries of India". Traditional Jewelry of India. New York: Thames & Hudson. pp. 69–73. ISBN 9780500287491.
- Wiley, Eleanor; Shannon, Maggie Oman (2002). A String and a Prayer: How to Make and Use Prayer Beads. Boston: Red Wheel/Weiser. ISBN 1590030109.
