= Inshallah =

Arabic expression meaning "if God wills" or "God willing"

Inshallah, (Note: /ɪnˈʃɑːlə/; Arabic: إِنْ شَاءَ ٱللَّٰهُ, romanized: ʾIn shāʾa l-Lāh, pronounced [ʔin ʃaː.ʔa‿ɫ.ɫaːh].) (Note: Also spelled In shaa Allah, In sha Allah, Insya Allah, and Inchallah.) usually called the istiṯnāʾ, (Note: Arabic: اِسْتِثْنَاء; 'formula of exception'; Arabic pronunciation: [istiθnaːʔ].) is an Arabic-language expression meaning 'if God wills' or 'God willing'. It is mentioned in the Quran, surah Al-Kahf (23-24), which requires its use when mentioning intended actions. It signifies that nothing, neither action nor thought, happens without God's permission.

== Usage ==
In an Islamic context, the phrase expresses the belief that nothing happens unless God wills it, and that his will supersedes all human will; and that saying this expression is a sign of trust in His given authority over whatever outcome of any matter in plan. However, the phrase is more generally and more commonly used by Muslims, Arab Christians, and Arabic speakers of other religions to refer to events that one hopes will happen in the future, having the same meaning as the English word "hopefully". In the Iberian languages, the expression was borrowed as oxalá or ojalá, and it is used in a similar way.

Although the Arabic phrase directly translates to "God willing", its meaning depends on the context. When used sincerely or in formal settings, it expresses the speaker’s hope for a specific outcome; however, in everyday speech, it is frequently used to suggest uncertainty, a lack of firm commitment, or as an open-ended response to requests or promises.

=== In English ===
The term was picked up by US marines through interactions with interpreters in Iraq and Afghanistan. Usage of the word in the English language became more common during the 2020s, it was used in public speeches by figures like Joe Biden, Anne Hathaway, Lindsay Lohan, and Sting. Middle East Eye described the phrase in 2020 as having "gone mainstream".

Former US president Joe Biden notably used it in the 2020 United States presidential debates, which led to numerous news reports, with varying reactions.

== See also ==
- Besiyata Dishmaya – Aramaic-language phrase meaning "with the help of Heaven"
- By the Grace of God
- Deo volente – Latin for 'God willing'
  - also Deus vult – Latin for 'God wills it'
- Predestination in Islam
- Phrases used in Islam:
  - Alhamdulillah – 'praise be to God'
  - Bismillah – 'In the name of God'
  - Dhikr – remembrance of God
    - Tasbih – form of dhikr
    - Tahlil – form of dhikr
  - Mashallah – 'God has willed it'
  - Shahada – Islamic statement of faith
  - Takbir – Arabic phrase ʾAllāhu ʾakbar^{u} meaning 'God is the greatest'
