= Ta'awwudh =

Arabic phrase asking for God's protection

Taʿawwudh (Arabic: تعوذ) is the Arabic term for the phrase, "I seek refuge in God from Shayṭān, the accursed one" (Arabic: أَعُوْذُ بِاللهِ مِنَ الشَّـيْطٰنِ الرَّجِيْمِ, romanized: aʻūdhu billāh min ash-shayṭān ar-rajīm). It is often recited by Muslims before reciting the Qur'an and before beginning a task. It is often followed by the basmala.

The taʿawwudh and basmala are pronounced along with the formulation of the niyya (intention). The recitation of ta`awwudh is considered a subcategory of dua. It is also described in the hadith as a supplication to reduce or remove anger.

== See also ==
- Glossary of Islam
- Alhamdulillah
