= Besiyata Dishmaya =

Aramaic-language expression used by Orthodox Jews

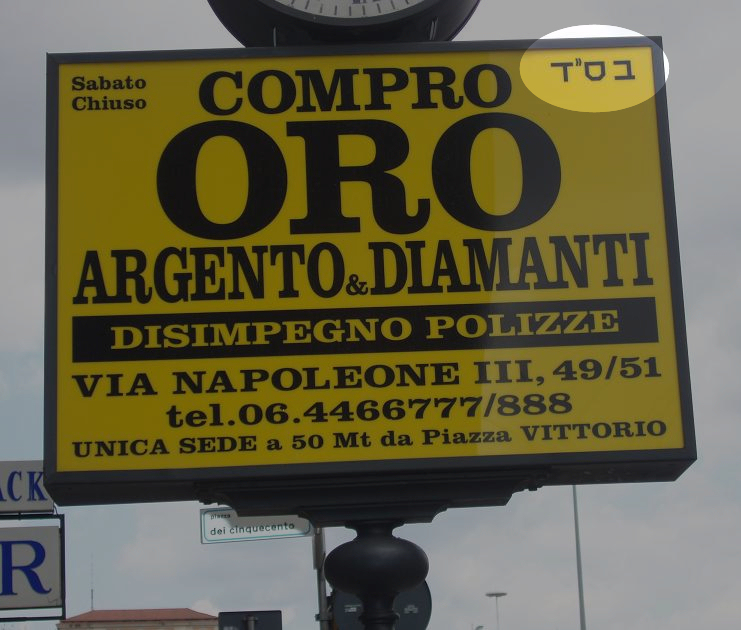
Street commercial sign in Rome, written in Italian. At top right is the abbreviation בס״ד

Besiyata Dishmaya (Jewish Babylonian Aramaic: בְּסִיַּעְתָּא דִּשְׁמַיָּא, romanized: bəsiyyaʿtāʾ dišmayyāʾ) is a phrase meaning 'with the help of Heaven'. The acronym בס״ד (BS"D) has become a popular term among Orthodox Jews, reproduced at the top of every written document (beginnings of correspondences, letters, notes, etc.) as a reminder to them that all comes from God, including the following content, and to contextualize what is really important in the text—without God's help, nothing can be done successfully. This practice is not derived from any religious law of halakha, but it is considered an old accepted tradition.

== Abbreviation ==
The reason for the common use of the three-letter abbreviation, בס״ד, is probably because it does not contain the letter Hei (ה), that is used to imply the name of God, and for this reason, a page which contains these letters, without any other Torah content, does not require genizah (a process for writings that contain the name of God), and thus can be thrown away without fear of violation.

Other languages, according to Judaism, are not considered the same as the sacred language (lashon Hakodesh), and therefore have no such restriction.

== B'ezrat HaShem ==
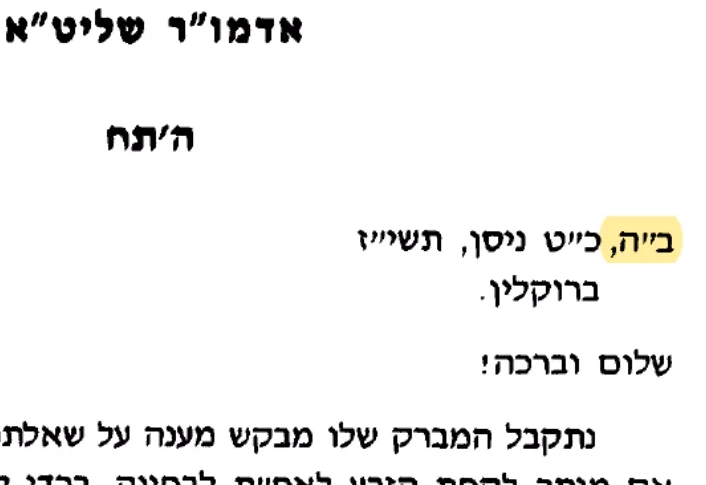
An example of a letter written in Hebrew that contains the acronym ב״ה

B'ezrat HaShem (Hebrew: בעזרת השם, lit. 'with the help of the name') is a similar phrase. The acronym is B"H (ב״ה) – (which is also often read as baruch haShem, 'blessed is the Name', usually used as an interjection), BE"H (בע״ה) or BEZ"H (בעז״ה).

The book Toldot Yitzhak (The Offspring of Isaac), by Yitzhak Karo, offers the meaning of this custom of writing ב״ה (B"H), at the top of every letter, with accordance to the biblical verse: "In all thy ways acknowledge Him, and He will direct thy paths" (Book of Proverbs 3:6).

== Cultural influence ==
- In the Israeli Declaration of Independence, Yehuda Leib Maimon added the abbreviation בעז״ה (Hebrew: בעזרת השם, romanized: B'ezrat HaShem, lit. 'with the help of [God's] name') before his name, so that God's name would appear in the document.
- In his book Mac OS X and iOS Internals: To the Apple's Core, Jonathan Levin named his BSD related chapter (Chapter 13): "BS”D – The BSD Layer" as allusions to his Jewish roots and to Mac OS X needing the help of a greater power (its BSD core) to get to where it did.
- Moroccanoil products feature the Aramaic expression on their products.

== See also ==
- Ad maiorem Dei gloriam
- Basmala
- Deus vult
- Inshallah
- Ojalá
