= Allah =

Arabic word for God

The word 'Allah' in thuluth calligraphy

Allah (/ˈælə, ˈɑːlə, əˈlɑː/ A(H)L-ə, ə-LAH; Arabic: الله, IPA: [ɑɫˈɫɑː]) is the Arabic language term for God, and is mainly used for God in Islam as well as other monotheistic conceptions of the God of Abraham. Outside of Arabic languages, it is principally associated with Islam (in which it is also considered the proper name of the Islamic God), although the term was used in pre-Islamic Arabia and continues to be used today by Arabic-speaking adherents of any of the Abrahamic religions, including Judaism and Christianity. It is thought to be derived by contraction from al-ilāh (الاله, lit. 'the god') and is linguistically related to other Semitic God names, such as Aramaic (ܐܲܠܵܗܵܐ ʼAlāhā) and Hebrew (אֱלוֹהַּ ʾĔlōah).

The word "Allah" now conveys the superiority or sole existence of one God, but among the pre-Islamic Arabs, Allah was the supreme deity and worshipped alongside lesser deities in a pantheon. Many Jews, Christians, and early Muslims used "Allah" and "al-ilah" synonymously in Classical Arabic. The word is also frequently, albeit not exclusively, used by Bábists, Baháʼís, Mandaeans, Indonesian Christians, Maltese Christians, and Sephardic Jews, as well as by the Gagauz people.

== Etymology ==
The etymology of the word Allāh has been discussed extensively by classical Arab philologists. The majority of scholars consider it to be derived from a contraction of the Arabic definite article al- and ilāh "deity, god" to al-lāh meaning "the deity, the God" as in the contraction of al-ʾilāt to Allāt. In some sources, the contracted and un-contracted forms are used interchangeably. Originally, ʾilāh was used as an epithet for the West Semitic creator god ʾIlu (the Ugaritic version of El), before being adopted as the proper name itself for this god.

Semitic cognates of "Allāh" appear in Semitic languages, such as the Aramaic ʼElāh (אלה) in the absolute form, and in its definite/emphatic form, ʼElāhā (אלהא), as in reflected in Biblical Aramaic. Also Syriac “ ܐܲܠܵܗܵܐ”(ʼAlāhā), both meaning simply "god", or "deity", used by both monotheists and pagans. Others are Akkadian ʾilum, Ugaritic ʾilu, and Phoenician ʾl. A minority hypothesis posits that Allah is a loanword from the Syriac Alāhā. A more likely theory is that, it is an adaptation of the word to the phonetic structure of Arabic.

Whether or not Allah can be considered as the personal name of God became disputed in contemporary scholarship. Islamic scholars have generally tried to explain the issue by rejecting approaches that associate this word with the names of other gods or that state it is derived from these names; grammarians of the Basra school regarded it as either formed "spontaneously" (murtajal) or as the determined form of llāh (from the verbal root lyh with the meaning suggesting of "lofty" or "hidden"). Other Muslims scholars proposed that the term derives from wilah ('the object of mystery') since the nature of God is a mystery and incomprehensible for humans. In Islamic usage and theology, Allah is God's most unique, proper name, and referred to as Lafẓ al-Jalālah ('the Word of Majesty'). Jahm bin Safwan was reported in later sources as holding that divine names, including "Allah", were created rather than eternal. Ibn Hanbal rejected this view.

== History of usage ==
=== Pre-Islamic Arabia ===
Regional variants of the word Allah occur in both pagan and Christian pre-Islamic Arabian inscriptions.

According to Marshall Hodgson, it seems that in the pre-Islamic Arabia, some Arab Christians undertook pilgrimages to the Kaaba, a pagan temple at that time, honoring Allah there as the God the Creator. Archaeological excavations have led to the discovery of pre-Islamic inscriptions and tombs made by Arab Christians in the ruins of a church at Umm el-Jimal in Northern Jordan, which initially thought to be containing references to Allah by Enno Littmann, as the proper name of God; however, this view was rejected by a second translation of the five-verse inscription made by Bellamy et al. (1985–88). In an inscription of Christian martyrion dated to 512, references to al-ilah (الاله) appear in both Arabic and Aramaic. The inscription opens with the phrase "By the Help of al-ilah". Irfan Shahîd quoting the 10th-century encyclopedic collection Kitab al-Aghani notes that pre-Islamic Arab Christians have been reported to have raised the battle cry "Ya La Ibad Allah" (O slaves of Allah) to invoke each other into battle. According to Shahid, on the authority of 10th-century Muslim scholar Al-Marzubani, "Allah" was also mentioned in pre-Islamic Christian poems by some Ghassanid and Tanukhid poets in Syria and Northern Arabia.

Different theories have been proposed regarding the role of Allah in pre-Islamic polytheistic Meccan cults. According to Ibn Kathir, Arab idolaters considered Allah as an unseen god who created and controlled the Universe. Pagans believed worship of humans or animals who had fortunate occurrences in their life brought them closer to God. Pre-Islamic Meccans worshiped Allah alongside a host of lesser gods and those whom they called the "daughters of Allah". According to Islamic sources, the Meccans and their neighbors believed that the goddesses Al-lāt, Al-'Uzzá, and Manāt, and in some cases the Angels, were the daughters of Allah. Some authors have suggested that polytheistic Arabs used the name as a reference to a creator god or a supreme deity of their pantheon. According to one Islamic hypothesis, the Kaaba was originally built by Abraham and his son Ishmael for the worship of a single supreme god, Allah, to whom people were called on pilgrimages. However, this place of worship was filled by the Quraysh with as many as 360 idols about a century before Muhammad's time. Some scholars have suggested that Allah may have represented a remote creator god who was gradually eclipsed by more particularized local deities. There is disagreement on whether Allah played a major role in the Meccan religious cult. No iconic representation of Allah is known to have existed. Muhammad's father's name was ʿAbd-Allāh meaning "the slave of Allāh". The interpretation that Pre-Islamic Arabs once practiced Abrahamic religions is supported by some literary evidence, being the prevalence of Ishmael, whose God was that of Abraham, in pre-Islamic Arab culture.

=== Islamic period ===
==== Early Islam ====
The worship of Allah, to the exclusion of all other deities, is the fundamental tenet of Islam, encapsulated in the testimony La ilaha illa Allah. The Quranic discourse with pagan Arabs did not aim to prove Allah's existence, but rather to purge it of polytheistic accretions, reinforcing this core monotheism. Quran frames the worship of Allah as the shared mission of all prophets—including Abraham, Moses, and Jesus—and invites the People of the Book to unite under this common word (3:64). "The Qur'ān insists that Muhammad and his followers worship the same God as the Jews (29:46). The Qur'an's Allah is the same Creator God who covenanted with Abraham". Francis Edward Peters states that the Qur'an portrays Allah as both more powerful and more remote than Yahweh, and as a universal deity, unlike Yahweh who closely follows Israelites. Since the first centuries of Islam, Arabic-speaking commentators of Jewish, Christian, and Islamic faith used the term Allah as a generic term for the supreme being. Saadia Gaon used the term Allah interchangeably with the term ʾĔlōhīm. Theodore Abu Qurrah translates theos as Allah in his Bible, as in John 1:1 "the Word was with Allah". Muslim commentators likewise used the term Allah for the Biblical concept of God. Ibn Qutayba writes "You cannot serve both Allah and Mammon." However, Muslim translators of the Middle East, North Africa, and Asia rarely translated the Tetragrammaton, referring to the supreme being in Israelite tradition, as Allah. Instead, most commentators either translated Yahweh as either yahwah or rabb, the latter corresponding to the Jewish custom to refer to Yahweh as Adonai.

In contrast with pre-Islamic Arabian polytheism, as stated by Gerhard Böwering, God in Islam does not have associates and companions, nor is there any kinship between God and jinn. Pre Islamic Arabs believed in a blind, powerful, unstoppable and insensible fate over which man had no control. This was replaced with the Islamic belief of a powerful yet benevolent and merciful God's control over man's life. In the early periods of Islam, the concept of God was established as a personal deity living in the heavens. This understanding developed over time under the influence of Islamic theology, acquiring a transcendent character. However, in contrast to this transcendent and absolute conception of God established among the elite, the public and Sufis (Note: Tajalli (Arabic: تَجَلِّي, romanized: tajallī, lit. 'manifestation') is the appearance and disclosure of God as truth in Sufism. Tajalli is believed to be a process by which God manifests himself in concrete forms.) maintained the traditional understanding of God. Also actions and attributes such as coming, going, sitting, satisfaction, anger and sadness etc. similar to humans used for this God in the Quran were considered mutashabihat—"no one knows its interpretation except God" (Quran 3:7)—by later scholars stating that God was free from resemblance to humans in any way. (Note: Human qualities which are attributed to Allah in the Quran such as coming, going, sitting, satisfaction, anger and sadness; "Allah has equipped them with words to bring them closer to our minds; in this respect, they are like proverbs that are used to create a picture in the mind and thus help the listener to clearly understand the idea he wants to express.")

==== Islamic theology ====
Islamic theology emphasises the absolute uniqueness and singularity of God in his essence, attributes, qualities, and acts. This emphasis was made despite a number of verses and hadiths that offer analogies for God, and it was gradually established over time. Instead, the term "mutashabih" was used for these verses, and the approach of "believing in the essence, not searching for its meaning" (Bila Kayf) was adopted. Understandings and expressions contrary to these definitions (tanzih) were described as shirk, which is considered one of the greatest sins in Islam, and it was said that those who did so would leave the religion.

God's Arsh (throne) and Kursi (pulpit)—may appear as chair or footstool in direct translations, often confused and used interchangeably in Islamic terminology—are also evaluated within this scope in Islamic theology;

"Indeed your Lord is Allah Who created the heavens and the earth in six Days, then established Himself on the Throne"

"You will see the angels all around the Throne, glorifying the praises of their Lord...."

Named as the Ayat al-Kursi of Surah al-Baqarah literally is this:

"Allah! There is no god except Him, the Living, Sustaining. Neither drowsiness nor sleep overtakes Him. To Him belongs whatever is in the heavens and whatever is on the earth. Who could possibly intercede with Him without His permission? He knows what is ahead of them and what is behind them, but no one can grasp any of His knowledge—except what He wills. His "Kursi" encompasses the heavens and the earth, and the preservation of both does not tire Him. He is High, Great."

Islamic teachings, in accordance with the principle of tawhid, also condemn statements that imply God is something comparable to known and created things. This understanding is based on the expressions in the chapter 112 of the Quran (Al-'Ikhlās, The Sincerity): These expressions were also used in polemics as a response to understandings that described God through the metaphor as father;

قُلْ هُوَ ٱللَّهُ أَحَدٌ ۝ ٱللَّهُ ٱلصَّمَدُ۝ لَمْ يَلِدْ وَلَمْ يُولَدْ ۝ وَلَمْ يَكُن لَّهُۥ كُفُوًا أَحَدٌۢ ۝١

۝ Say, God is one God;
۝ the eternal God:
۝ He begetteth not, neither is He begotten:
۝ and there is not any one like unto Him.

Most Qur'anic commentators, including al-Tabari (d. 923), al-Zamakhshari (d. 1143/44), and al-Razi (d. 1209), regard word Allah to be a proper noun i.e. (ism' li-dhatih), while other names denote attributes or adjectives known as the 99 Names of Allah (al-asmā' al-ḥusná lit. meaning: 'the beautiful names'). The most famous and frequently repeated names are "the Merciful" (ar-Raḥmān) and "the Compassionate" (ar-Raḥīm), al-Aḥad ("the One") and Al Hayy (the living one). In a Sufi practice known as dhikr Allāh (Arabic: ذِكر الله, lit. "Remembrance of God"), the Sufi chants and contemplates the name Allah or other associated divine names to Him while regulating his or her breath. Islamic theology rejects definitions and expressions that imply a comparison between God and His creations, because He cannot be likened to His creations in any of His attributes. However, it is observed that many of these names are translated as "the most..." in a comparative mode, as in the expression Allāhu ʾAkbar (Arabic: اللّٰهُ أَكْبَر [ʔaɫ.ɫaː.hu ʔak.bar], lit. 'God is the greatest'), which is also used as an Islamic slogan.

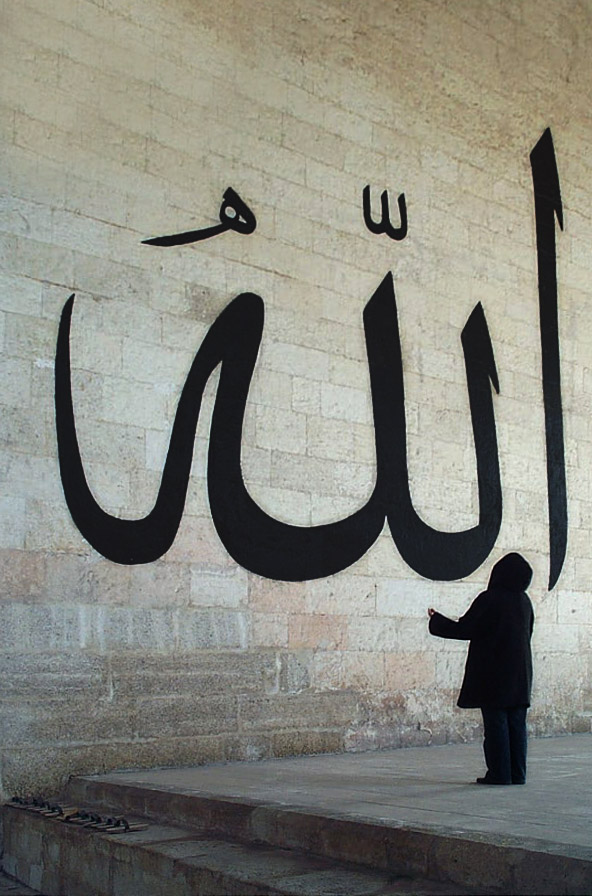
Allah script outside the Old Mosque in Edirne, Turkey

=== Present day ===
==== Islam ====
The Islamic tradition to use Allah as the personal name of God became contested in contemporary scholarship, including the question, whether or not the word Allah should be translated as God. Umar Faruq Abd-Allah encouraged English-speaking Muslims to use God instead of Allah for the sake of finding "extensive middle ground we share with other Abrahamic and universal traditions".

Most Muslims use the Arabic phrase in shā'a llāh (meaning 'if God wills') untranslated after references to future events. Muslim devotional practices encourage beginning things with the invocation of bi-smi llāh (meaning 'In the name of God'). There are certain other phrases in praise of God that are commonly used by Muslims and left untranslated, including "Subḥāna llāh" (Glory be to God), "al-ḥamdu li-llāh" (Praise be to God), "lā ilāha illā llāh" (There is no deity but God) or sometimes "lā ilāha illā inta/ huwa" (There is no deity but You/ Him) and "Allāhu Akbar" (God is the Most Great) as a devotional exercise of remembering God (dhikr).

==== Christianity ====
The Christian Arabs of today have no other word for "God" than "Allah". Similarly, the Aramaic word for "God" in the language of Assyrian Christians is ʼĔlāhā, or Alaha. (Even the Arabic-descended Maltese language of Malta, whose population is almost entirely Catholic, uses Alla for "God".)

Arab Christians have used two forms of invocations that were affixed to the beginning of their written works. They adopted the Muslim bismillāh, and also created their own Trinitarian bismillāh as early as the 8th century. The Muslim bismillāh reads: "In the name of God, the Compassionate, the Merciful." The Trinitized bismillāh reads: "In the name of the Father and the Son and the Holy Spirit, One God." The Syriac, Latin, and Greek invocations do not have the words "One God" at the end. This addition was made to emphasize the monotheistic aspect of Trinitarian belief and also to make it more palatable to Muslims.

== Pronunciation ==
The Arabic components that make up the word "Allah": 1. alif; 2. hamzat waṣl (همزة وصل); 3. lām; 4. lām; 5. shadda (شدة); 6. alif khunjāriyah (ألف خنجرية); 7. hāʾ

The word Allāh is generally pronounced [ɑɫˈɫɑː(h)], exhibiting a heavy lām, [ɫ], a velarized alveolar lateral approximant, a marginal phoneme in Modern Standard Arabic. Since the initial alef has no hamza, the initial [a] is elided when a preceding word ends in a vowel. If the preceding vowel is /i/, the lām is light, [l], as in, for instance, the Basmala.

== As a loanword ==
=== English and other European languages ===
The history of the name Allāh in English was probably influenced by the study of comparative religion in the 19th century; for example, Thomas Carlyle (1840) sometimes used the term Allah but without any implication that Allah was anything different from God. However, in his biography of Muḥammad (1934), Tor Andræ always used the term Allah, though he allows that this "conception of God" seems to imply that it is different from that of the Jewish and Christian theologies.

Languages which may not commonly use the term Allah to denote God may still contain popular expressions which use the word. For example, because of the centuries long Muslim presence in the Iberian Peninsula, the word ojalá in the Spanish language and oxalá in the Portuguese language exist today, borrowed from Andalusi Arabic law šá lláh similar to inshalla (Arabic: إِنْ شَاءَ ٱللَّٰهُ). This phrase literally means 'if God wills'. The German poet Mahlmann used the form "Allah" as the title of a poem about the ultimate deity, though it is unclear how much Islamic thought he intended to convey.

Some Muslims retain the name "Allāh" untranslated in English, rather than using the English translation "God".

=== Malaysian and Indonesian language ===
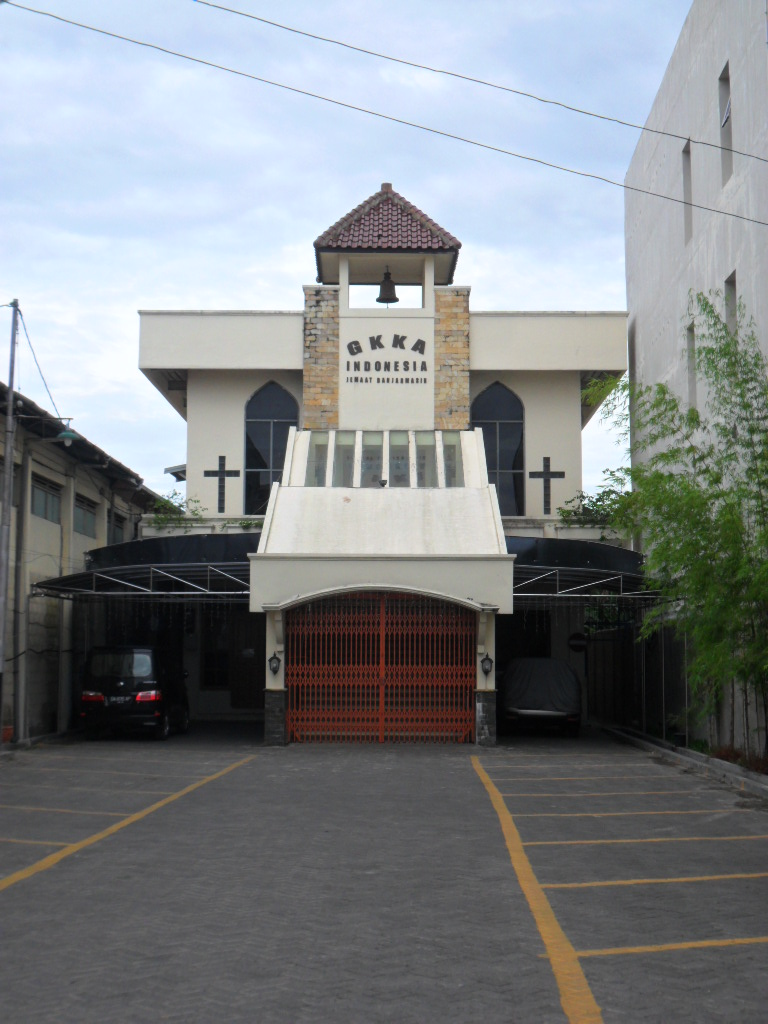
Gereja Kebangunan Kalam Allah (Word of God Revival Church) in Indonesia. Allah is the word for "God" in the Indonesian language - even in Alkitab (Christian Bible, from الكتاب, al-kitāb = the book) translations, while Tuhan is the word for "Lord".

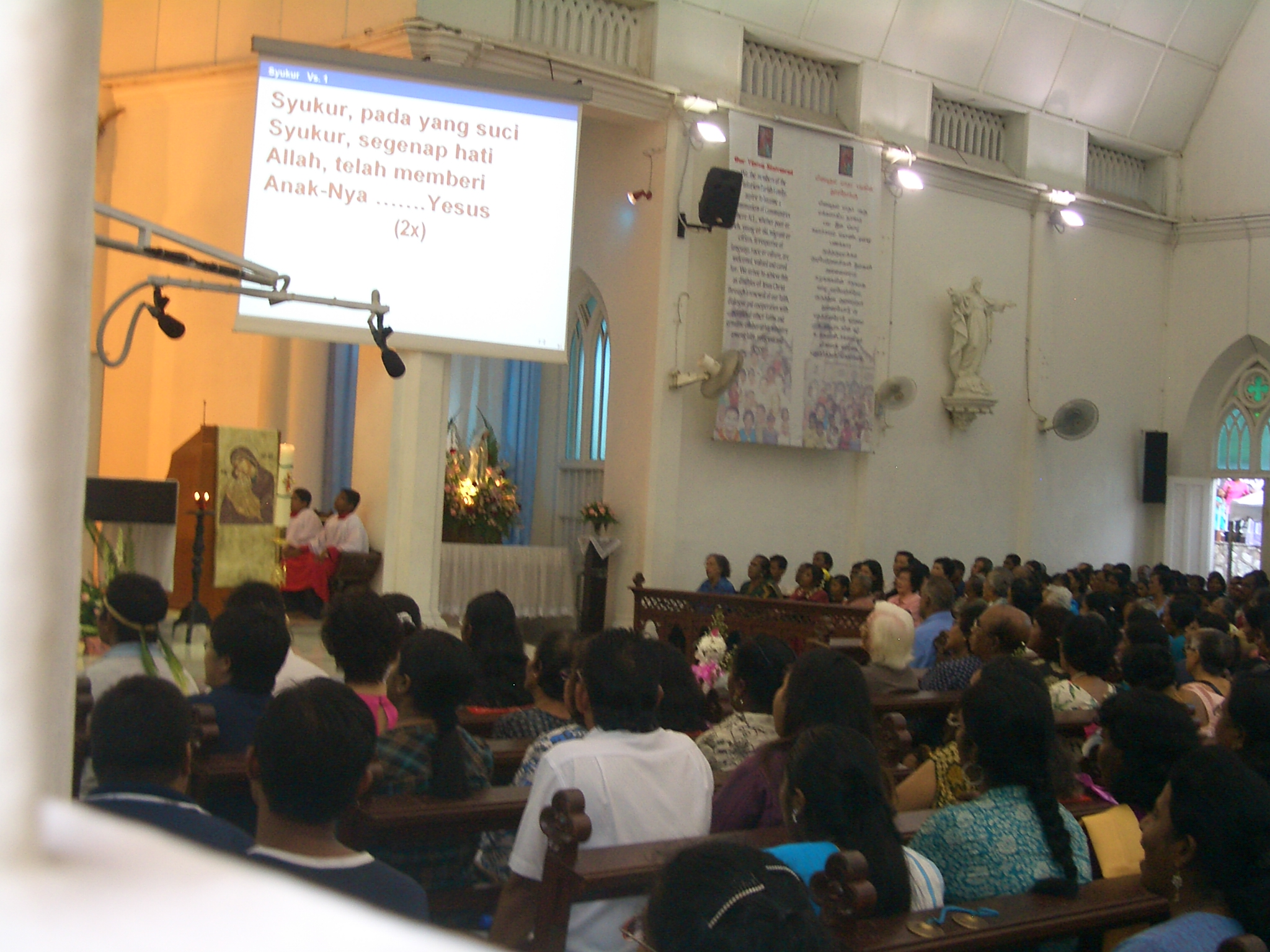
Christians in Malaysia also use the word Allah for "God".

Christians in Malaysia and Indonesia use Allah to refer to God in the Malaysian and Indonesian languages (both of them standardized forms of the Malay language). Mainstream Bible translations in the language use Allah as the translation of Hebrew Elohim (translated in English Bibles as "God"). This goes back to early translation work by Francis Xavier in the 16th century. The first dictionary of Dutch-Malay by Albert Cornelius Ruyl, Justus Heurnius, and Caspar Wiltens in 1650 (revised edition from 1623 edition and 1631 Latin edition) recorded Allah" as the translation of the Dutch word Godt. Ruyl also translated the Gospel of Matthew in 1612 into the Malay language (an early Bible translation into a non-European language, made a year after the publication of the King James Version), which was printed in the Netherlands in 1629. Then he translated the Gospel of Mark, published in 1638.

For a time it became illegal for non-Muslims to use "Allah" after the country experienced a social and political upheaval in the face of the word being used by Malaysian Christians and Sikhs. The government of Malaysia in 2007 prohibited usage of the term Allah in any other but Muslim contexts, but the Malayan High Court in 2009 overturned the law, ruling it unconstitutional. While Allah had been used for the Christian God in Malay for more than four centuries, the contemporary controversy was triggered by usage of Allah by the Roman Catholic newspaper The Herald. The government appealed the court ruling, and the High Court suspended implementation of its verdict until the hearing of the appeal. In October 2013 the court ruled in favor of the government's ban. In early 2014 the Malaysian government confiscated more than 300 bibles for using the word to refer to the Christian God in Peninsular Malaysia. However, the use of Allah is not prohibited in the two Malaysian states of Sabah and Sarawak. The main reason it is not prohibited in these two states is that usage has been long-established and local Alkitab (Bibles) have been widely distributed freely in East Malaysia without restrictions for years. Both states also do not have similar Islamic state laws as those in West Malaysia. The ban was overturned in 2021.

In reaction to some media criticism, the Malaysian government has introduced a "10-point solution" to avoid confusion and misleading information. The 10-point solution is in line with the spirit of the 18- and 20-point agreements of Sarawak and Sabah.

== Typography ==
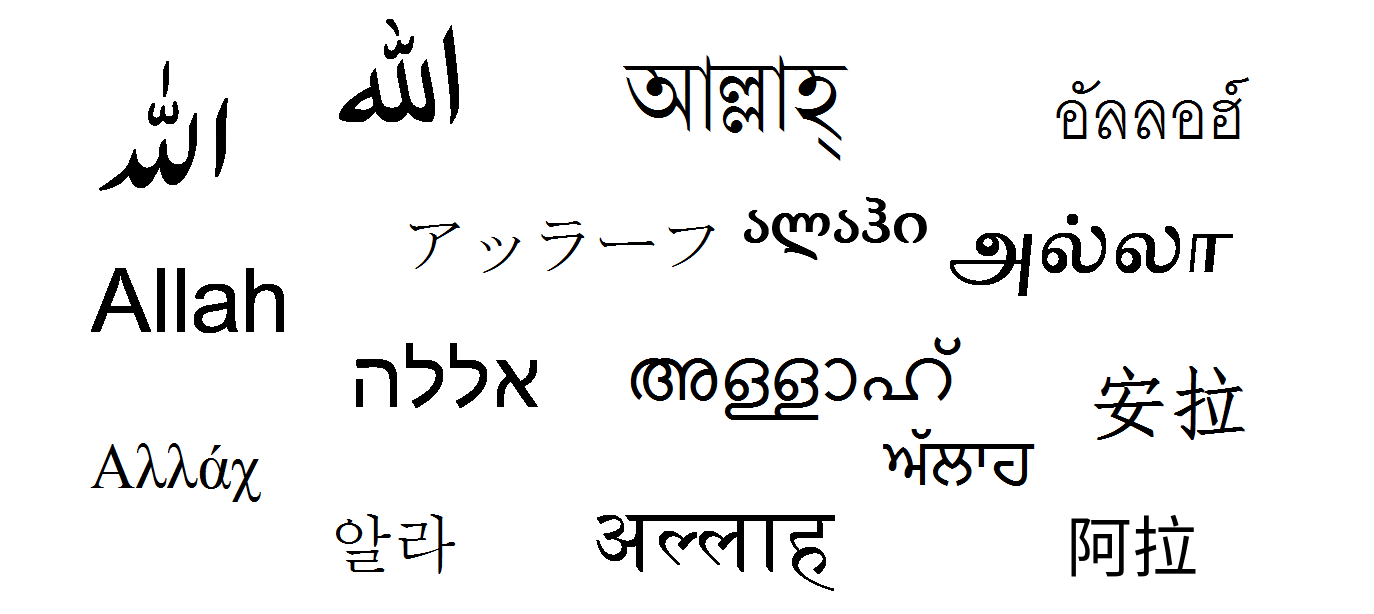
The word Allah written in different writing systems

The word Allāh is always written without an alif to spell the ā vowel. This is because the spelling was established before Arabic spelling started regularly using alif to spell ā. However, in vocalized spelling, a small diacritic alif is added on top of the shaddah to indicate the pronunciation.

In the pre-Islamic Zabad inscription, God is referred to by the term الاله, that is, alif-lam-alif-lam-ha. This presumably indicates Al-'ilāh means "the god", without alif for ā.

Many Arabic type fonts feature special ligatures for Allah.

Since Arabic script is used to write other texts rather than Koran only, rendering lām + lām + hā' as the previous ligature is considered faulty which is the case with most common Arabic typefaces.

This simplified style is often preferred for clarity, especially in non-Arabic languages, but may not be considered appropriate in situations where a more elaborate style of calligraphy is preferred.

—SIL International

=== Unicode ===
Unicode has a code point reserved for Allāh, U+FDF2 ﷲ ARABIC LIGATURE ALLAH ISOLATED FORM, in the Arabic Presentation Forms-A block, which exists solely for "compatibility with some older, legacy character sets that encoded presentation forms directly"; this is not recommended for new text. Instead, the word Allāh should be represented by its individual Arabic letters, while modern font technologies will generate the desired ligature.

The calligraphic variant of the word used as the emblem of Iran is encoded in Unicode, in the Miscellaneous Symbols range, at code point U+262B (☫). The flags that include the word are also present in the regional indicator symbols of Unicode: 🇮🇶, 🇸🇦, 🇦🇫, 🇮🇷, 🇺🇿.

== Flags and national emblems ==
The term "Allah" and related religious phrases hold significant symbolic value in various national symbols, flags, and emblems across the Muslim world:

=== Flags ===
- Iran: In the flag of Iran the phrase Allahu Akbar (God is Greatest) repeated 22 times along the borders of the green and red stripes, symbolizing the date of the Islamic Revolution (22nd of Bahman). The central emblem of the flag is a stylized calligraphic representation of the word Allah, which also incorporates the phrase La ilaha illa Allah (There is no god but Allah).
- Iraq: In the flag of Iraq The phrase Allahu Akbar is inscribed in the center of the flag.
- Saudi Arabia: In the flag of Saudi Arabia the flag displays the Shahada—the Islamic declaration of faith: La ilaha illa Allah, Muhammadur Rasul Allah (There is no god but Allah, Muhammad is the messenger of Allah).
- Afghanistan: In the flag of Afghanistan The national flag historically features the Shahada and the Takbir (Allahu Akbar).

=== National Emblems ===
- - The national emblem of Afghanistan incorporates the Shahada and the Takbir.
- - The national emblem of Azerbaijan features a calligraphic representation of the name Allah stylized to resemble an eternal flame.
- - The national emblem of Iran is a stylized calligraphic design of the word Allah, containing the hidden phrase La ilaha illa Allah.
- - The national emblem of Iraq features the Takbir (Allahu Akbar).
- - The coat of arms of Jordan includes the phrase Al-Raji min Allah al-Tawfiq wa al-'Awn (Hoping for Allah's guidance and help).
- - The coat of arms of Morocco bears the Quranic verse: In tansuru Allaha yansurkum (If you support Allah, He will support you).

== Gallery ==
=== National flags with "Allah" written on them ===
Flag of Iraq with the Takbir written on it

Flag of Saudi Arabia with the Shahada written on it

Flag of Afghanistan with the Shahada written on it

Flag of Iran with the Takbir written on it

Flag of Somaliland with the Shahada written on it

== See also ==
- Glossary of Islam
- Outline of Islam
- Abdullah (name)
- Allah as a lunar deity
- Emblem of Iran
- Ismul Azam
- Names of God
- Names of God in Judaism

== General and cited references ==
- Al-Jallad, Ahmad (2025). "Ancient Allah: An Epigraphic Reconstruction". Journal of Semitic Studies: 1–56.
- Cook, Michael (2024). A History of the Muslim World. Princeton University Press.
- Nasr, Seyyed Hossein; Dagli, C.K.; Dakake, Maria Massi; Lumbard, J.E.B.; Rustom, M., eds. (2015). The Study Quran: A New Translation and Commentary. Harper Collins. ISBN 978-0-06-222762-1.
- The Unicode Consortium, Unicode Standard 5.0, Addison-Wesley, 2006, ISBN 978-0-321-48091-0, About the Unicode Standard Version 5.0 Book
- Williams, Wesley (2002). "Aspects of the Creed of Imam Ahmad ibn Hanbal: A Study of Anthropomorphism in Early Islamic Discourse". International Journal of Middle East Studies. 34 (3): 441–463. doi:10.1017/S0020743802003021.
