= Moroccanoil =

Israeli cosmetics company

Moroccanoil Israel, Ltd.
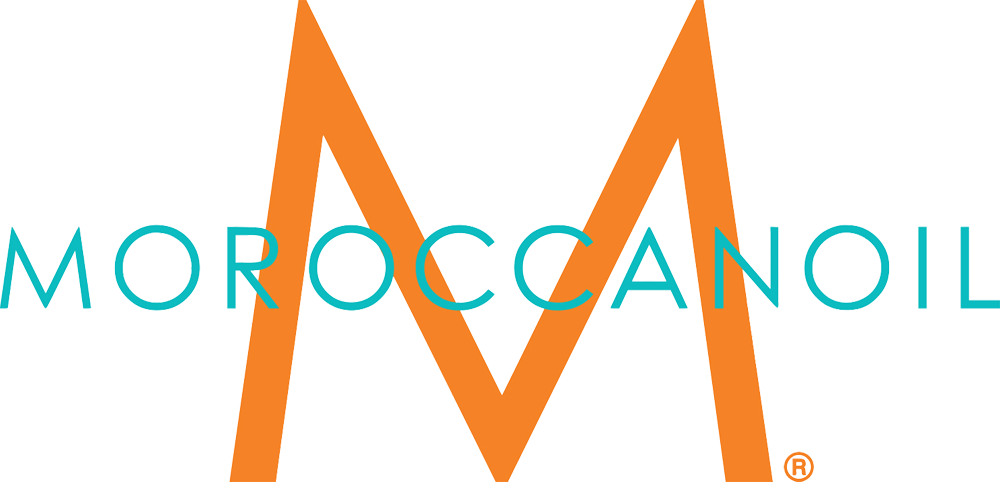
- Trade name: Moroccanoil
- Type: Private
- Industry: Cosmetics
- Founded: 2003 (23 years ago) in Tel Aviv, Israel
- Headquarters: 135 East 57th St. New York, NY 10022; U.S.
- Area served: Worldwide
- Key people: David Cohen (executive chairman); Jay Elarar (CEO)
- Products: Argan oil-based hair care products
- Revenue: US$≈750 million (May 2025)
- Number of employees: ≈826 (May 2025)
- Website: www.moroccanoil.com

Moroccanoil is an Israeli cosmetics company headquartered in Midtown Manhattan, New York City, specializing in hair care products containing argan oil from Morocco. The company has production facilities in Israel, Italy, and North America. The company was started in 2003 in Tel Aviv by two brothers and bought in 2008 by Carmen and Ofer Tal.

Moroccanoil sells its products in over 85 countries worldwide. mostly business-to-business to beauty salons (around 85,000 as of January 2020); More recently the company began expanding its sales directly to consumers, particularly in travel retails and duty-free shops. In addition, a number of celebrities and fashion houses have been reported to use the company's products.

== History ==
=== 2000s: Foundation ===
In 2003, Israeli hairdresser Mike Sabag began experimenting with argan oil shared with him by his mother after a trip to her native Morocco. He began selling the product to hair salons in the Tel Aviv area, running the business with his brother Erik.

During a trip to Israel in 2006, Montreal salon owner Carmen Tal learned about argan oil. Her husband Ofer Tal contacted the Sabag brothers and acquired distribution rights in North America. After achieving commercial success in the United States, the couple purchased the company in 2008 and moved production to a new plant in northern Israel. They named the company Moroccanoil.

=== 2010s and 2020s: Expansion ===
Over the years, Moroccanoil's products became available in an increasing number of countries, and their lines were expanded to include body care products in 2016 and fragrances in 2021. The company opened a salon academy for stylists in Manhattan in 2020.

From 2020 to 2026, Moroccanoil was the chief sponsor of the Eurovision Song Contest.

== Operations ==
As of January 2013, 80% of Moroccanoil's output is reportedly manufactured in its factory "two hours north of Jerusalem", with Ma'alot-Tarshiha being cited as the plant's location in the company's safety data sheets. The company has production facilities in Israel, Italy and Canada, as well as offices in Montreal (where it has its legal department in Mount Royal), Rishon LeZion (where it is legally registered), Edgware, Frankfurt, Tokyo and São Paulo. The subsidiaries of Moroccanoil include Moroccanoil Israel Ltd., Moroccanoil Inc., Moroccanoil Canada Inc., Moroccanoil Japan KK, Moroccanoil UK Limited and Moroccanoil DE GmbH.

== Products ==
The company's first product was Moroccanoil Treatment, a hair product containing argan oil. Moroccanoil expanded its argan oil-based formula to include shampoo and conditioner, hair spray, and styling products. The company expanded into body care with the Moroccan Body collection, comprising moisturizers, exfoliating scrubs, and soap. The Airy Moisture product line was introduced in Asia in 2023, marketed as specially formulated for hair needs in the region. Its first fragrance, Fleur d'Oranger, was introduced in 2015 and L'Originale in 2025. Moroccanoil began selling an argan oil lip balm in 2026.
