= Karram-Allah-u Wajhahu =

Karram-Allah-u Wajhah (Arabic: كرم الله وجهه; English: May God exalt his face) is a phrase used almost solely to honor the first Shia Imam and fourth Rashidun Caliph Ali as the only early Muslim who never knelt down to an idol in Jahilyah, and always followed Muhammad. This honorific is mostly used by some Sunnis and is acceptable to Shi'a Muslims. However, Shi'a prefer using Alayh-es-Salam or "Peace be upon him", which is conventionally used for the prophets and archangels.

According to Nasr, in the Battle of Uhud Ali fought the great Quraysh warrior Talha ibn Abi Talha. Talha constantly boasted that he defeats any Muslim who comes his way. When Talha was defeated by Ali, he asked for mercy by saying the phrase Karram-Allah-u Wajhahu. According to Nasr, this prayer of goodness became one of the titles of Ali that is mostly used by Sunnis. This phrase, which is usually accompanied by other words, is used to send greetings and good prayers.
