= Tasbih =

Form of dhikr that involves the repetitive utterances praising Allah

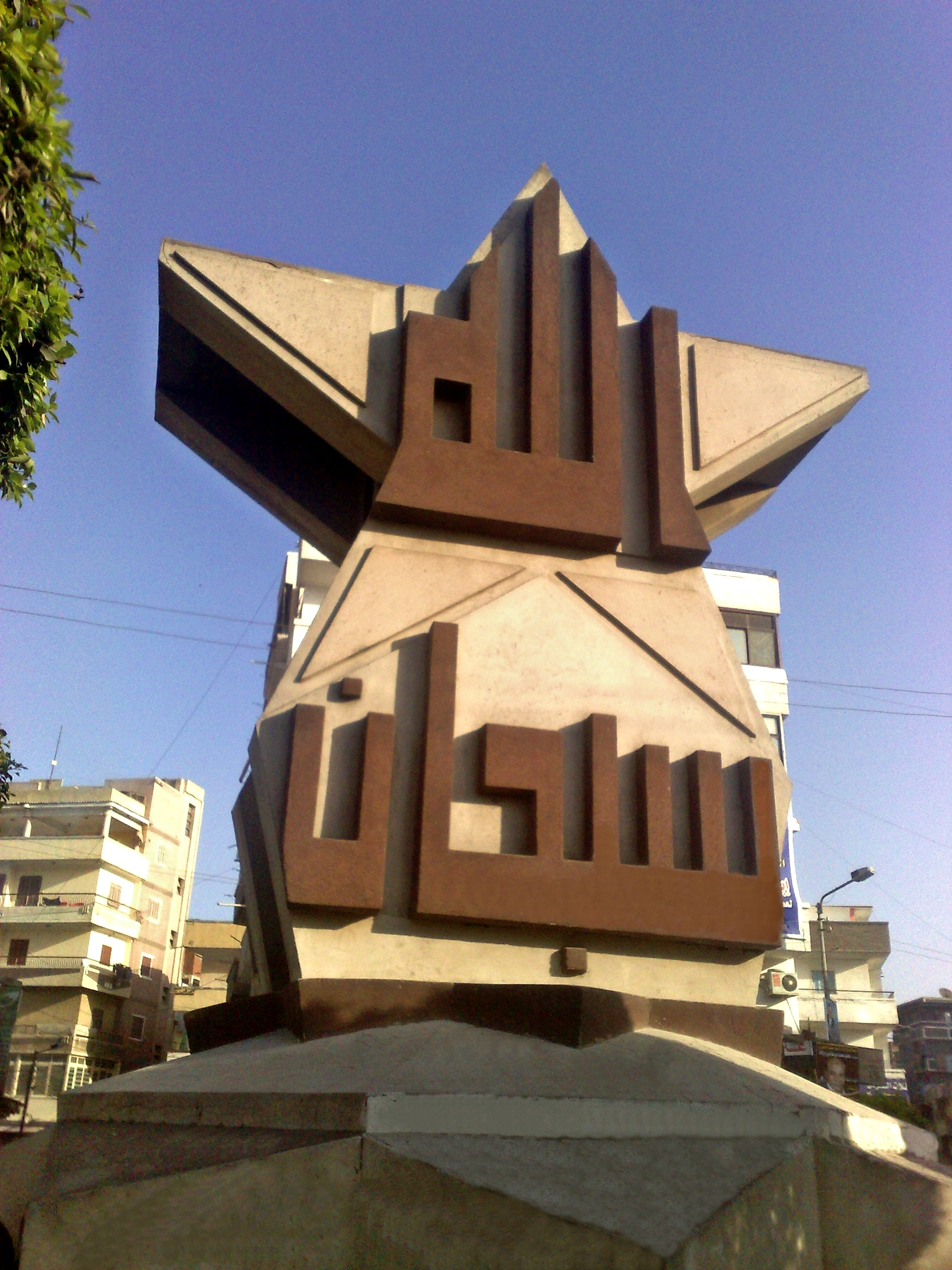
Glory to Allah "Subhan Allah" in Arabic, Desouk, Egypt

Tasbih (Arabic: تَسْبِيح, romanized: tasbīḥ) is a form of dhikr that involves the glorification of God in Islam by saying: "Subhan Allah" (Arabic: سُبْحَانَ ٱللهِ, romanized: subḥāna llāh^{i}, lit. 'Glory be to Allah').

It is often repeated a certain number of times, using either the fingers of the right hand or a misbaha to keep track of counting.

== Etymology ==
The term tasbeeh is based on in the Arabic root of sīn-bāʾ-ḥāʾ (ح-ب-س). The meaning of the root word when written means to glorify. 'Tasbeeh' is an irregular derivation from subhan, which is the first word of the constitutive sentence of the first third of the canonical form (see below) of tasbeeh. The word literally means, as a verb, "to travel swiftly" and, as a noun, "duties" or "occupation". However, in the devotional context, tasbih refers to Subhan Allah, which is often used in the Qur'an with the preposition ʿan (عَنْ), meaning "Allah is exalted [over what they (polytheists) attribute to Him]" (Al-Tawba: 31, Al-Zumar: 67 et al.). Without this preposition, it means something like "Glory be to Allah." (Quran, Surah Al-Baqarah, Verse 116).

== Interpretation ==
The phrase translates to "Glory be to God" but a more literal translation is, "God is above [all things]". The root of the word subḥān (سُبْحَان) is derived from the word sabaḥa (سَبَحَ, "to be above"), giving the phrase a meaning that God is above any imperfection or false descriptions.

The phrase often has the connotation of praising God for his total perfection, implying a rejection of any anthropomorphic elements or associations with God, or any attribution of mistakes or faults to him. Thus, it serves as testimony to God's transcendence (تنزيه, tanzīh).

For example, the Quran says subḥāna llāhi ʿammā yaṣifūn ("God is above that which they describe") and subḥāna llāhi ʿammā yušrikūn ("God is above that which they associate with him").

The phrase is mentioned in the hadiths of Sahih Bukhari, VBN 5, 57, 50.

== Variants ==
Various Islamic phrases include the Tasbih, most commonly:

Arabic Qurʾanic Spelling	Transliteration IPA	Phrase
سُبْحَانَ ٱللَّٰهِ سُبْحَٰنَ ٱللَّٰهِ	subḥāna -llāh^{i} /sub.ħaː.na‿ɫ.ɫaː.hi/	Glorified is God.
سُبْحَانَكَ ٱللَّٰهُمَّ سُبْحَٰنَكَ ٱللَّٰهُمَّ	subḥānaka -llāhumm^{a} /sub.ħaː.na.ka‿ɫ.ɫaː.hum.ma/	Glorified are you, O God.
سُبْحَانَ ٱللَّٰهِ وَبِحَمْدِهِ سُبْحَٰنَ ٱللَّٰهِ وَبِحَمْدِهِ	subḥāna -llāhi wa-bi-ḥamdih^{ī} /sub.ħaː.na‿ɫ.ɫaː.hi wa.bi.ħam.di.hiː/	Glorified is God and by His praise.
سُبْحَانَ رَبِّيَ ٱلْعَظِيمِ وَبِحَمْدِهِ سُبْحَٰنَ رَبِّيَ ٱلْعَظِيمِ وَبِحَمْدِهِ	subḥāna rabbiya l-ʿaẓīmi wa-bi-ḥamdih^{ī} /sub.ħaː.na rab.bi.ja‿l.ʕa.ðˤiː.mi wa.bi.ħam.di.hiː/	Glorified is my Lord, the Great, and by His praise.
سُبْحَانَ رَبِّيَ ٱلْأَعْلَىٰ وَبِحَمْدِهِ سُبْحَٰنَ رَبِّيَ ٱلْأَعْلَىٰ وَبِحَمْدِهِ	subḥāna rabbiya l-ʾaʿlā wa-bi-ḥamdih^{ī} /sub.ħaː.na rab.bi.ja‿l.ʔaʕ.laː wa.bi.ħam.di.hiː/	Glorified is my Lord, the Most High, and by His praise.
لَا إِلَٰهَ إِلَّا أَنْتَ سُبْحَانَكَ إِنِّي كُنْتُ مِنَ ٱلظَّالِمِينَ لَا إِلَٰهَ إِلَّا أَنْتَ سُبْحَٰنَكَ إِنِّي كُنْتُ مِنَ ٱلظَّٰلِمِينَ	lā ʾilāha ʾillā ʾanta subḥānaka ʾinnī kuntu mina ẓ-ẓālimīn^{a} /laː ʔi.laː.ha ʔil.laː ʔan.ta sub.ħaː.na.ka ʔin.niː kun.tu mi.na‿ðˤ.ðˤaː.li.miː.na/	There is no god except You, glorified are you! I have indeed been among the wrongdoers.

== Usage ==
It is also often cited during the Islamic prayer (salat), supplication (dua), during a sermon (khutba) in the mosque and commonly throughout the day. It is sometimes used to express shock or amazement.

Muhammad taught Muslims that it is one of the four praises that God likes Muslims to say continuously.

=== Fatimah bint Muhammad ===
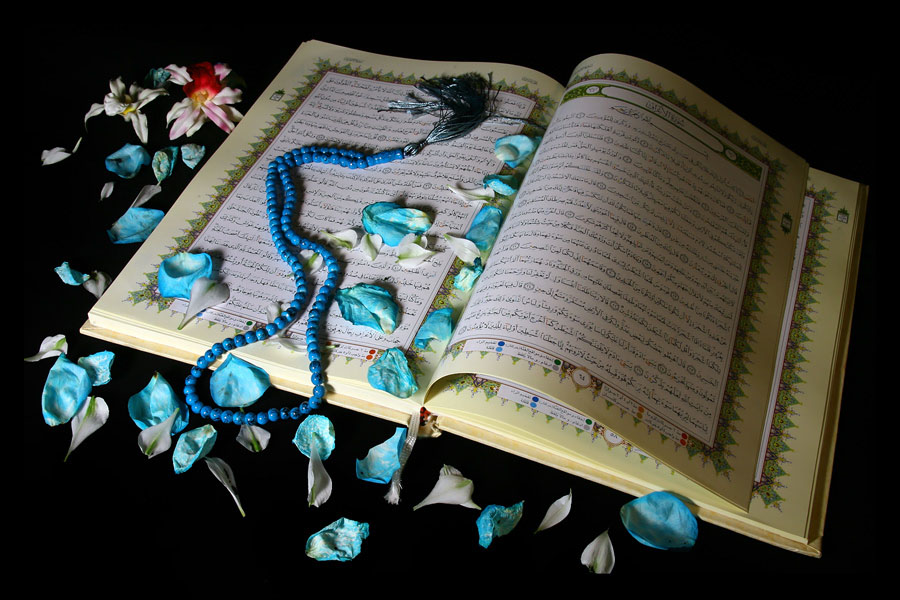
Qur'an and Tasbih of Fatimah

In the early years of the marriage of Ali and Fatimah, Ali earned very little money and was unable to afford a servant for Fatimah. Fatimah's hands were blistered from constant grinding; her neck had become sore from carrying water; her clothes had become dirty from sweeping the floor. One day Ali was aware that Prophet Muhammad had some servants, and advised Fatimah to ask him for one of his servants. Fatimah went, but she was unable to ask. Finally, Ali went with Fatimah to Muhammad's house. He did not accept their request, saying "there are many orphans (starved), "I will give you one thing better than helping of servant". He taught them a special manner of Dhikr which is known as the "tasbih of Fatimah".

1. 34 repetitions of ʾallāhu ʾakbar^{u} (ٱللَّٰهُ أَكْبَرُ), meaning "God is Greater [than everything]". This saying is known as Takbir (تَكْبِير).
2. 33 repetitions of al-ḥamdu lillāh^{i} (ٱلْحَمْدُ لِلَّٰهِ), meaning "All praise is due to God.". This saying is known as Tahmid (تَحْمِيد).
3. 33 repetitions of subḥāna -llah^{i} (سُبْحَانَ ٱللَّٰهِ), meaning "Glorified is God". This saying is known as Tasbih (تَسْبِيح).

== See also ==
- Tasbih of Fatimah
- Tahmid
  - Al-hamdu lillahi rabbil 'alamin
- Tahlil
- Takbir
- Tasmiyah
- Salawat
- Peace be upon him
- Shahadah
- Hallelujah
