= Jazakallah =

Islamic expression of gratitude

Jazāk Allāh (Arabic: جَزَاكَ ٱللَّٰهُ, jazāka -llāh) or Jazāk Allāhu Khayran (جَزَاكَ ٱللَّٰهُ خَيْرًا, jazāka -llāhu khayran) is an Arabic expression of gratitude, meaning "May God reward you [with] goodness."

Although the common word for thanks in Arabic is shukran (شُكْرًا), Jazāk Allāh khayran is often used by Muslims, regardless of ethnicity.

The response to this phrase is wa ʾiyyāk(i) (وَإِيَّاكَ), or wa ʾiyyākum (وَإِيَّاكُمْ) for the plural, which means "and to you". A more formal reply is "wa ʾantum fajazākumu llāhu khayran" (وَأَنْتُمْ فَجَزَاكُمُ ٱللَّٰهُ خَيْرًا) "And you too, may God reward you with goodness".
