= Alhamdulillah =

Arabic phrase, "Praise be to God"

- Arabic: ٱلْحَمْدُ لِلَّٰهِ
- Romanization: al-Ḥamdu lillāh
- Literal meaning: "praise be to God"

Alhamdulillah (Arabic: الحمد لله, al-Ḥamdu lillāh) is an Arabic phrase meaning "praise be to God", sometimes translated as "thank God", "praise be to Allah" or "thanks be to the Lord". This phrase is called Tahmid (Arabic: تَحْمِيد, lit. 'Praising'). A longer variant of the phrase is al-ḥamdu l-illāhi rabbi l-ʿālamīn (ٱلْحَمْدُ لِلَّٰهِ رَبِّ ٱلْعَالَمِينَ), meaning "all praise is due to God, Lord of all the universes", the first verse of Surah Al-Fatiha, the opening chapter of the Quran.

The phrase is frequently used by Muslims of every background due to its centrality in the texts of the Quran and Hadith, the words of the Prophet Muhammad. Its meaning and in-depth explanation have been the subject of much exegesis. It is also commonly used by non-Muslim speakers of the Arabic language.

A similar variation used in Christianity is the phrase "Hallelujah", an adaptation of the Hebrew word found in the Jewish Book of Psalms.

== Origins ==
The phrase "al-ḥamdu li-llāh" is believed to be an Arabization of the Greek phrase, "glory to God" (δόξα τῷ θεῷ), mediated through the Syriac expression "praise be to God" (teshbuhtâ l-alâhâ).

== Meaning ==
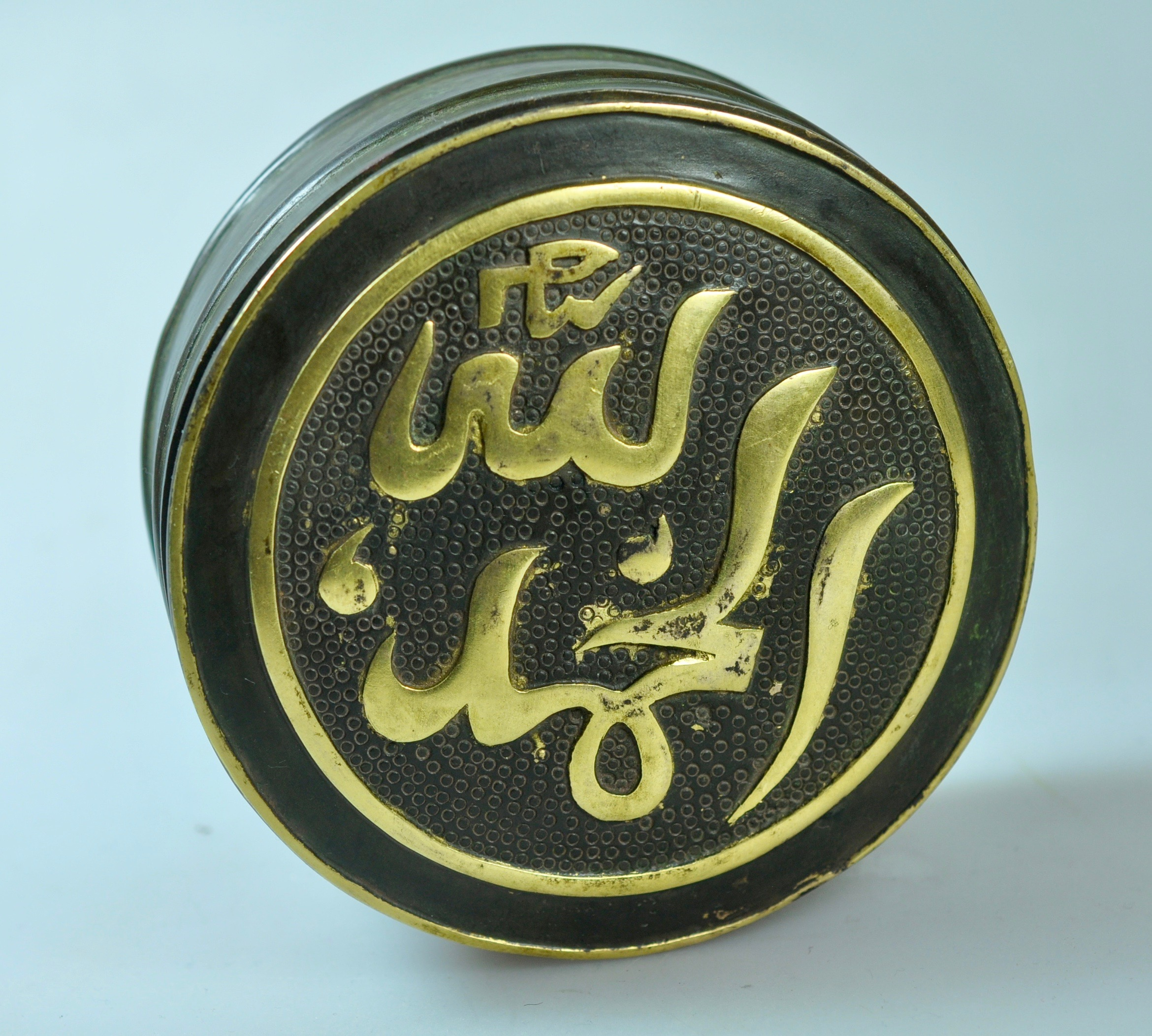
Alhamdulillah written in Sini-Arabic script on an incense box, Qing Dynasty, 19th century, China. Adilnor Collection, Sweden.

The phrase has three basic parts:

- al-, the definite article, "the".
- ḥamd(u), literally meaning "praise", "commendation".
- li-llāh(i), preposition + noun Allāh. Li- is a dative preposition meaning "to". The word Allāh (Arabic: ٱللَّٰه) is the proper name of the God of Abraham. "Al ilah" means "The God", and it is a combination of the definite article al- and the word ʾilāh (Arabic: إِلَٰه, "god, deity"). As in English, the article is used here to single out the noun as being the only one of its kind, "the God" (the one and only) or "God". Therefore, Allāh is the Arabic word for "God". ʾilāh is the Arabic cognate of the ancient Semitic name for God, El.

The phrase is first found in the first verse of the first Surah of the Quran (Al-Fatiha). So frequently do Muslims and Arabic-speaking Jews and Christians invoke this phrase that the quadriliteral verb hamdala (Arabic: حَمْدَلَ), "to say al-ḥamdu li-llāh" was coined, and the derived noun ḥamdala is used as a name for this phrase.

The triconsonantal root Ḥ-M-D (Arabic: ح م د), meaning "praise", can also be found in the names Muhammad, Mahmud, Hamid, and Ahmad, among others.

== Translation ==
English translations of alhamdulillah include:

- "all praise is due to God alone" (Muhammad Asad)
- "all the praises and thanks be to God" (Muhammad Muhsin Khan)
- "praise be to God" (Abdullah Yusuf Ali, Marmaduke Pickthall)
- "all praise is due to God" (Sahih International)

== Variants ==
Various Islamic phrases include the Tahmid, most commonly:

Arabic Classical Arabic	Transliteration IPA	Phrase
ٱلْحَمْدُ لِلَّٰهِ	ʾalḥamdu lillāh^{i} /ʔal.ħam.du lil.laː.hi/	All praise is due to God.
ٱلْحَمْدُ لِلَّٰهِ رَبِّ ٱلْعَالَمِينَ	ʾalḥamdu lillāhi rabbi l-ʿālamīn^{a} /ʔal.ħam.du lil.laː.hi rab.bi‿l.ʕaː.la.miː.na/	All praise is due to God, Lord of all the universes.
سُبْحَانَ ٱللَّٰهِ وَبِحَمْدِهِ	subḥāna -llāhi wa-bi-ḥamdih^{ī} /sub.ħaː.na‿ɫ.ɫaː.hi wa.bi.ħam.di.hiː/	Glorified is God and by His praise.
سُبْحَانَ رَبِّيَ ٱلْعَظِيمِ وَبِحَمْدِهِ	subḥāna rabbiya l-ʿaẓīmi wa-bi-ḥamdih^{ī} /sub.ħaː.na rab.bi.ja‿l.ʕa.ðˤiː.mi wa.bi.ħam.di.hiː/	Glorified is my Lord, the Great, and by His praise.
سُبْحَانَ رَبِّيَ ٱلْأَعْلَىٰ وَبِحَمْدِهِ	subḥāna rabbiya l-ʾaʿlā wa-bi-ḥamdih^{ī} /sub.ħaː.na rab.bi.ja‿l.ʔaʕ.laː wa.bi.ħam.di.hiː/	Glorified is my Lord, the Most High, and by His praise.

== See also ==
- Glossary of Islam
- Outline of Islam
- Inshallah
- Basmala (Bismillah)
- Jazakallah
- Mashallah
- Praise the Lord
