= Tahlil =

Form of dhikr meaning "there is no deity but God"

The Tahlil or Tahleel (Arabic: تَهْلِيل, romanized: tahlīl, pronounced [tahˈliːl]) is a form of dhikr (ritually repeated phrase) that involves the praising of God in Islam by saying "There is no god but Allah. He has no partner with Him" (لَا إِلٰهَ إِلَّا الله وَحْدَه لَا شَرِيكَ لَه, Lā ilāha illā Llāh, waḥdahu lā sharīka lah).

== Etymology ==
The word Tahlil is the verbal noun of the form 2 verb hallala (هَلَّلَ) which means 'to praise' or 'to acclaim'.

== History ==
Traditionally, the utterance of the sentence is part of the shahada (testimony of faith) performed by somebody converting to Islam. It is recommended for tahlil to be uttered as the last words of a dying person as a hadith states that the person who dies uttering the tahlil (with conviction in the words) will certainly enter Jannah.

In Indonesia and Malaysia, ritualized repetitive chanting of the tahlil is part of the tradition of kenduri, which is common during death rituals. The custom is known locally as majlis tahlīl (مَجْلِس تَهْلِيل), 'assembly to perform prayers'. This practice is more common among Muslims who are followers of the traditionalist Nahdlatul Ulama movement.

== Hadith ==
According to Abu Huraira, the Prophet of Islam said

He who utters a hundred times in a day these words: "there is nobody worthy of worship except Allah. He is One and He has no partner with Him; His is the sovereignty and His is the praise, and He is Omnipotent)," he will have a reward equivalent to that for emancipating ten slaves, a hundred good deeds will be recorded to his credit, hundred of his sins will be blotted out from his scroll, and he will be safeguarded against the devil on that day till the evening; and no one will exceed him in doing more excellent good deeds except someone who has recited these words more often than him.

Malik ibn Anas reported from Talha ibn Ubaydullah ibn Kariz that Muhammad said, "The best dua is dua on the Day of Arafa, and the best thing that I and the Prophets before me have said is "There is nothing worshipped but Allah, alone without any partner."

== See also ==
- Shahada
- Tawhid
- Anthem of the Chechen Republic of Ichkeria, which repeats the tahlil throughout
