= Glossary of Islam =

The following list consists of notable concepts that are derived from Islamic and associated cultural (Arab, Persian, Turkish) traditions, which are expressed as words in Arabic or Persian language. The main purpose of this list is to disambiguate multiple spellings, to make note of spellings no longer in use for these concepts, to define the concept in one or two lines, to make it easy for one to find and pin down specific concepts, and to provide a guide to unique concepts of Islam all in one place.

Separating concepts in Islam from concepts specific to Arab culture, or from the language itself, can be difficult. Many Arabic concepts have an Arabic secular meaning as well as an Islamic meaning. One example is the concept of dawah. Arabic, like all languages, contains words whose meanings differ across various contexts.

Arabic is written in its own alphabet, with letters, symbols, and orthographic conventions that do not have exact equivalents in the Latin alphabet (see Arabic alphabet). The following list contains transliterations of Arabic terms and phrases; variations exist, e.g. din instead of deen and aqidah instead of aqeedah. Most items in the list also contain their actual Arabic spelling.

== A ==
ʿAbd (عبد) (for male) ʾAmah (أمة) (for female)
Servant or worshipper. Muslims consider themselves servants and worshippers of God as per Islam. Common Muslim names such as Abdullah (Servant of God), Abdul-Malik (Servant of the King), Abdur-Rahmān (Slave of the Most Beneficent), Abdus-Salām (Slave of [the originator of] Peace), Abdur-Rahîm (Slave of the Most Merciful), all refer to names of Allah.

ʾAdab (أدب)
Traditionally describes good manners, as in etiquette. For example, being courteous is good ʾadab. However, the term can be used very broadly, and the proper translation would be "the proper way to go about something", as in the example, ʾĀdāb al Qitāl, or, "The Proper Ways of Fighting in War," (Qitāl in Arabic means mortal combat) in which the word "etiquette" does not befit the context. A secondary meaning of ʾAdab is "literature".
ʾAdhān (أذان)
Call to salah (prayer), sometimes alternatively spelled and pronounced as Azaan, Athaan and Adhan.
ʿAdl (عدل)
Justice, especially distributive justice: social, economic, political, proprietary.
AH (هجرية)
Anno Hegirae. The Islamic calendar which starts counting years starting from the time when Muhammad had to leave Makkah (Mecca) and go to Medina, an event known as the Hijrah. The first day of the first Islamic year is 1 Muḥarram 1 (AH) and corresponds to 16 July 622 (CE).
ʾAḥad (أحد)
Literally: "one." Islamically, ahad means One Alone, unique, none like God. Al-Ahad is one of the 99 names of God.
ʾAḥkām (أحكام)
The rulings and orders of the Qur'an and Sunnah. A singular ruling is called a Ḥukm. There are five kinds of orders: Wajib or Fard (obligatory), Mustahabb (preferred and recommended), Halal or Mubah (permissible), Makruh (disliked and not recommended), and Haram (forbidden).
ʾAhl al-Bayt (أهل البيت)
Members of Muhammad's Household. Also known among the Shi'a as the Maʿṣūmūn (معصومون) (infallibles; spiritually pure).
ʾAhl al-Fatrah (أهل الفطرة)
People who live in ignorance of the teachings of a revealed religion, but according to the Fitra, the "Natural Religion" innate to human nature as created by God.
ʾAhl al-Kitāb (أهل الكتاب)
"People of the Book", or followers of pre-Islamic monotheistic religions with some form of scripture believed to be of divine origin which were mentioned in Qur'an: Jews, Christians and Sabians.
ʾĀkhirah (الآخرة)
Hereafter or eternal life.
ʾAkhlāq (أخلاق)
The practice of virtue, morals.
Al-ʾIkhlāṣ (الإخلاص)
Sincerity and genuineness in religious beliefs.
Al-Bir (البّر)
Piety and righteousness and every act of obedience to Allah.
ʿĀlamīn (عالمين)
Literally: "worlds", humankind, jinn, angels and all that exists.
Al Hijr (Kaaba) (الكعبة)
A semi-circular wall north-west of the Ka'aba.
ʿalayhi -s-salām (عليه السلام)
"Peace be upon him." This expression normally follows after naming a prophet (other than Muhammad), or one of the noble Angels (i.e. Jibreel (Gabriel), Mika'il (Michael), etc.).
al-ḥamdu li-llāh (الحمد لله)
"Praise be to God!" Qur'anic exclamation, similar to "Hallelujah".
Allāh (الله)
The name of God according to Islam. Also used as the Arabic word for God in general.
Allāhumma (اللَّهُمَّ)
"O Allah, my Lord", used in a phrase or salutation, invocations or supplications (dua).
Allāhu ʾAkbar (أكبر)
"Allah is [the] greatest". Greater than anything or anyone, imaginable or unimaginable.
ʿĀlim (عالِم)
Literally: "one who knows". A scholar (in any field of knowledge); a jurist or scientist (who knows science) or a theologian (who knows religion); similar to Japanese sensei, "teacher".
Amān
Literally: "safety, protection, safe conduct".
ʾAmānah (أمانة)
The trust. Of all creation, only human beings & jinnss carry the "trust", which is free will.
ʾĀmīn (آمين)
Amen.
ʾAmīr ul-Muʾminīn (المؤمنين)
"Commander of the Faithful." Historically, it was the title of the Caliph. In some modern countries like Morocco, an ʾAmīr ul-Muʾminīn or Commander of the Faithful is the religious chief.
ʾĀminah (آمنة)
Muhammad's mother. Aminah fell sick and died in Abwa, near Medina (then Yathrib) when Muhammad was six years old.
Al-ʾAmr Bi'l Maʿrūf (بالمعروف)
Islamic doctrine of enjoining right, the (obligatory) principle of encouraging other people to do the right thing.
ʾAnfāl (أنفال)
Spoils of war. (See Sūrat al-ʾAnfāl (8:1)) (الأنفال)
ʾAnṣār (أنصار)
"Helpers." The Muslim converts at Medina who helped the Muslims from Makkah (Mecca) after the Hijrah.
ʿAqīdah (عقيدة)
Article of faith, tenet, creed, or dogma.
ʿAqīqah (عقيقة)
The Islamic practice of shaving the head of the newborn male and contributing the weight in silver for charity as well as two lambs.
ʿAql (عقل)
Intelligence, intellect, mind, understanding
ʾArkān singular rukn (ركن/أركان)
The five rukn (English: pillars) of Islam.
A'raf (الأعراف)
Literally: "an elevated piece of earth", used to refer to the walls that divide Paradise (Jannah) and Hell (Jahannam).
A.S. (ʿAlayhi s-salām) (السلام)
This acronym evokes a blessing and is appended to the names of the prophets who came before Muhammad. It is also be applied to the mothers of those prophets. When following a woman's name, the feminine form is ʿAlayha s-salām.
aṣaḥḥ
Arabic elative term, "more correct." Used by Muslim scholars to introduce their own view while not entirely dismissing that of others.
ʾAṣl (أصل) (pl. ʾuṣūl)
Root, origin, source; principle.
ʾaslim taslam (أسلِم تسلَم)
"Submit to Islam", (See: dawah).
ʾAsmāʾ Allāh al-Ḥusnā (الحسنى)
The list of God's 99 names. According to a hadith, the one who enumerates them all will enter Paradise (Jannah).
ʿAṣr (العصر)
The third salat prayer. Also means an indefinite duration of time.
Aṣ-Ṣirāṭ (الصراط)
The bridge by crossing which it is determined (judged) whether a person would go to Heaven (Jannah) or Hell (Jahannam). How a person crosses the Sirat depends on what they have done in their life and what they have believed in.
al-ʿAsharatu Mubashsharun bil-Jannah or Asharatu Mubashsharah (Arabic: العشرة المبشّرون بالجنة, romanized: ʿAsharatu l-mubashshirūn or Arabic: عشرة المبشّر, romanized: Asharatul-mubashshirūna bil Jannah)
The ten Companions of Muhammad who were promised Paradise (Jannah), (only in Sunni Islam).
ʿĀshūrāʾ (عاشوراء)
Tenth day of the month of Muharram. It is the day God saved Musa (Moses) and the children of Israel from the Pharaoh. The grandson of Muhammad, Imam Hussayn, sacrificed his life along with 72 of his companions on the sand dunes of Karbala. Sunni scholars recommended to fast during this day. To the Shi'a, it is also a day on which they mourn the death of the third Shi'a Imam, Husayn ibn Ali, along with his family and companions, who were killed in the famous battle in Karbala. They mourn and organize lamentating programmes where they learn how to live a proper Islamic life and improve their Spiritual Self. This also includes crying at the end of the ritual to show their faith towards Imam Husayn.
As-Salāmu ʿAlaykum (السلام عليكم)
The Islamic greeting; literally: "Peace be upon you"; In addition, wa-Raḥmatullāhi wa-Barakātuhu (وبركاته) means "and the Mercy of God and His blessing". The response to this greeting is wa-ʿAlaykum as-Salām wa-Raḥmatullāhi wa-Barakātuhu (وبركاته)—"And on you be the Peace and Mercy of God and His Blessing".
ʾAstaghfir allāh (أستغفر الله)
"I seek forgiveness from God", an Islamic expression.
Aʿudhu billah (باللهʾAʿūdhu billāh)
"I seek refuge in God", a paraphrase on the beginnings of the two last surahs in the Qur'an.
ʾAwliyāʾ (أولياء)
Friends, protectors, helpers, caretaker, maintainer. (Singular: wali)
ʿAwrah (عورة)
The parts of the body, male or female, which must be covered in public but not between spouses. Also refers to the body parts that women must concealed before non-related men. ("Non-related men" means those she can marry lawfully, see mahram for non-marriable men).
ʾĀyah (آية), plural ʾāyāt (آيات)
A sign. More specifically, a verse in the Qur'an.
Āyatullāh (آية الله, also spelled Ayatollah)
Sign of God. A title given to highly ranked religious scholars in the Shi'a sect.
Azāzīl
A name of Iblīs (Satan) in his role as a fallen angel. (Potentially etymologically related to Azazel from the Apocalypse of Abraham).

== B ==
Baiʿa (بيعة)
See: Bay'ah.
Baatil (باطل)
See: Bāṭil.
Baitullāh (بيت اللهbaytu -llāh)
A masjid (mosque), literally: "house of God". Specifically means the Ka'aba at Makkah (Mecca).
Bakka'in
A group known as the Weepers, who wept because they could not accompany Muhammad to Tabuk.
Barakah (بركة)
A form of blessing, thought derived from God and passed on others via prophets, angels and saints.
Bārak Allāhu Fīkum (فيكم)
"May Allah bless you"; a response to an expression of thanks.
Barzakh (برزخ)
Barrier. Used in the Qur'an to describe the barrier between sweet and salty water. In theology, it is the one-way barrier between the mortal realm and the spirit world which the deceased soul crosses and waits for Qiyamah judgment.
Bashar (بشر)
Humankind, mankind, man, human(s), etc.
Baṣīrah (بصيرة)
Insight, discernment, perceptivity, deep knowledge. Sometimes used by Sufis to denote the ability to directly perceive a transcendental Truth.
Bāṭil (باطل)
Void.
Bāṯin (باطن)
The interior or hidden meaning. A person who devotes himself to studying such hidden meanings is a batini.
B.B.H.N. (والسلام)
Blessed be His Name, an acronym for S.A.W.S. (See: P.B.U.H (Peace Be Upon Him)).
Bidʿah (بدعة)
Innovation in religion, i.e. inventing new methods of worship. Bad Bidʿahs in Islam are considered a deviation and a serious sin by many Muslims.
Bidʿah sayyiʾah (سيئة)
Inquiry prohibited in Islam.
Bismi-llāhi r-raḥmāni r-raḥīmi (بسم الله الرحمن الرحيم)
"In the name of Allah, the Most Gracious, the Most Merciful". Also called the Basmala, it is the phrase that is written or recited before each surah (except for the 9th surah, At-Tawbah).
Burda (بردة)
In general terms, it means a "cloak" or an "outer garment". A specific reference is to the "burda" of Muḥammad (see Al-Burda).
Bayʿah (بيعة)
An oath of allegiance to a leader, traditionally the Caliph, a Sheikh or an Imam.

== C ==
Caliph (خَليفة) khalīfah
Literally: "successor"; refers to the successor of Muhammad, the ruler of an Islamic theocracy.

== D ==
Dahri (دهري)
Atheist – from the root ad dahr, meaning "time". In Islam, atheists are seen as those who think that only time can destroy, hence the term ad dahriyyah or simply dahriya for the concept of atheism.
Dajjāl (ٱلدَّجَّالُ)
The Islamic equivalent of the Antichrist; meaning "liar" or "deceiver".
Ḍallāl (ضلال)
Going astray.
Dār al-ʿAhd (دَارُ الْعَهْدِ)
The Ottoman Empire's relationship with its Christian tributary states.
Dār al-ʾAmn (دَارُ الْأَمْنِ)
Meaning a "house of safety".
Dār ad-daʿwa (دَارُ الدَّعْوَةِ)
A region where Islam has recently been introduced.
Dār al-ḥarb (دَارُ الْحَرْبِ)
"House of war"; refers to areas outside Muslim rule which a Muslim state can go to war with.
Dār al-Islām (دَارُ الْإِسْلَامِ)
"Home of peace." A country ruled by Islamic Law (see: Shari'ah), where both Muslims and non-Muslims (see: dhimam) practice religious tolerance.
Dār aṣ-Ṣulḥ (دَارُ الصُّلْحِ)
"Domain of agreement".
Dār ash-shahāda (دَارُ الشَّهَادَةِ)
See: Dar al-Amn
Darūd (الدرود، الصلاة على النبي)
"Blessing".
Daʿwah (الدعوة)
The call to Islam, proselytizing.
Darwīš (درويش)
An initiate of the Sufi Path, one who practices Sufism
Dhikr (ذكر)
A devotional practice whereby the name of God is repeated in a rhythmical manner. A remembrance of God; a spiritual exercise; Muslims believe that the primary function of prophets is to remind people of God. It is also pronounced as zikr.
Dhimmi (ذمّي) (pl. dhimam)
"Protected person"; refers to Jews and Christians (and sometimes others, such as Buddhists, Sikhs, Hindus, and Zoroastrians) living in an Islamic state who must pay a separate tax (jizya) instead of the zakah paid by Muslims, exempting non-Muslims from military service under Islamic law.
Dhuhr (ظهر) (ẓuhr)
The second obligatory daily prayer.
Dīn (الدين)
Literally: "religion", the way of life based on Islamic revelation; the sum of a Muslim's faith and practice. Dīn is often used to mean the faith and religion of Islam.
Diyyah (دية)
"Blood money", recompense for loss of a life.
Div (دیو)
"Demon", hideous creatures in Islamic beliefs.
Duʿāʾ (دعاء)
Personal prayer, supplication.
Dunya (دنيا)
The physical Universe as opposed to the Hereafter; sometimes spelled Dunia.

== E ==
Eid al-Fitr (عِيدُ الْفِطْرِ)

Marks the end of Ramadan [Ramzaan], the Islamic holy month of fasting (sawm).

Eid al-Adha

Honours the willingness of Ibrahim (Abraham) to sacrifice his son Ishmael (Isma'il) as an act of obedience to God's command.

== F ==
Fadl
Divine grace.
Fajarah (فجرة) (also fujjār (فجّار))
Wicked evil doers. Plural of fājir (فاجر).
fajr (فجر)
Dawn, early morning, and the morning prayer. The time of the day when there is light in the horizon before sunrise.
Falāḥ (فلاح)
Deliverance, salvation, well-being.
Falsafah (فلسفة)
"Philosophy", the methods and content of Greek philosophy which were brought into Islam. A person who tries to interpret Islam through rationalist philosophy was called a faylasuf (فيلسوف), English: "philosopher".
Fanā' (فناء)
A Sufi term meaning extinction, a spiritual death of the lower self (Nafs) with associated bad characteristics. Also refers to having no existence outside of God.
Faqīh (فقيه)(pl. fuqahāʾ)(فقهاء)
One who has a deep understanding of Islam, its laws and jurisprudence. (See: fiqh).
Al-Faraj (الفرج)
The return of the Shi'a Mahdi.
Farḍ (فرض), plural furūḍ (فروض)
A religious duty, or an obligatory action: for example, praying 5 times a day is fard. Neglecting a fard will result in a punishment in the Hereafter. (See: wajib).
Farḍ ʿain ( عين)
Obligatory on every individual Muslim to aid in any way they can.
Farḍ kifāyah (كفاية)
An obligation on the Muslim community as a whole, from which some are freed if others take it up, such as for jihad.
Fāsid (فاسد)
Corrupt, invalid/violable (in Islamic finance).
Fāsiq (فاسق)
Anyone who has violated Islamic law; usually refers to one whose character has been corrupted (plural: "fāsiqūn"); in the Qur'an it refers to unbelievers who derided God for using similes and parables (in the Qur'an).
Fātiḥa (الفاتحة)
The short, opening surah of the Qur'an, which begins with: "In the name of God, the Merciful, the Compassionate. Praise be to God, the Lord of the Worlds..." These words hold an important place in Muslim liturgies and forms the core of the salat.
Fatwā (فتوى)
A non-binding legal opinion of a scholar (alim). However, it is binding on him for those who follow his taqlid.
Fī ʾAmān allāh (في أمان الله)
"In the protection of God", said when a person departs. Cf. aman.
Fiqh (فقه)
Jurisprudence built around the Shari'ah by custom (al-urf). Literally: "deep understanding", refers to understanding the Islamic laws. (See: faqih).
Fir'aun (فرعون)
Literally: "Pharaoh".
Fī sabīl allāh (في سبيل الله)
"For the sake of Allah"; a common Islamic expression for performing acts such as charity or jihad.
Fitna (pl. fitan) (فتنة)
Trial or tribulation; also refers to any period of disorder, such as a civil war, or the period of time before the end of the world or any civil strife.

Fitnah: (n) temptation, discord, civil war, trial

Fiṭrah (فطرة)
Innate disposition towards virtue, knowledge, and beauty. Muslims believe that every child is born with fitrah.
Furqān (فرقان)
The criterion (of right and wrong, true and false); for example, the Qur'an as furqan. Also the title of the 25th chapter (surah) of the Qu'ran (Al-Furqan).
Fuwaysiqah (فويسقة)
Vermin, evil from the root fasaqa, meaning: "to deviate from the right way".

== G ==
Ghafara (غفر)
(verb in past tense) To forgive, to cover up (sins). A characteristic of God.
Ghaflah (غفلة)
Heedlessness, forgetfulness of God, indifference
Ghayb (غيب)
The unseen, unknown.
Ghanīmah (غنيمة)
Spoils of war, booty.
Gharar (غرر)
Excessive uncertainty; also "the sale of what is not present", such as fish not yet caught, crops not yet harvested.
Ghasbi (غصب)
Possessed unlawfully.
Ghāzi (غازى)
(archaic) Roughly, "raider": used for whose who participated in war. Later a title for veterans.
Ghusl (غسل)
Full ablution of the whole body (see: wudu). Ghusl janaba is the mandatory shower after having sexual discharge.

== H ==
Ḥadath akbar (حدث أكبر)
Major ritual impurity which requires Niyyat for cleaning.
Ḥadath aṣghar (أصغر)
Minor ritual impurity.
Hādhā min faḍl rabbī (هَذَا مِن فَضْلِ رَبِّي)
Qur'anic expression and phrase, meaning: "This is by the Grace of my Lord."
Hādī (هادي)
A guide, one who guides; a Muslim name for God is The Guide, or Al-Hadi. (See also: the 99 names of God.)
Ḥadīth (حديثḥadīth) plural ahādīth
Literally: "speech"; a recorded saying or tradition of Muhammad validated by isnad; along with sira these comprise the Sunnah and reveal Shari'ah.
Ḥadīth mashhūr (مشهور)
Well-known hadith; a hadith which reported by one, two, or more Companions from Muhammad or from another Companion, but has later become well-known and transmitted by an indefinite number of people during the first and second generation of Muslims.
Ḥāfiẓ (حافظ)
Literally: "Memorizer or Protector". Refers to someone who memorized the entire Qur'an.
Ḥaiḍ (حيض)
Menstruation.
Ḥājj (حاجّ) plural Ḥujjāj (حجّاج) and Ḥajīj (حجيج)
A Pilgrim, one who has made the Hajj.
Ḥajj (حجّ) and Ḥijjah (plurals Ḥijjāt (حجّات) and Ḥijaj (حجج))
One-time pilgrimage to Makkah (Mecca) during Dhu'l-Hijja. Sunnis regard this as the fifth Pillar of Islam. It is obligatory upon every Muslim who is financially and physically capable of completing all necessary rites.
Ḥajj at-Tamattuʿ (التمتع)
Performing ʿUmrah during the Hajj season, and on the Day of Tarwiah a pilgrim gets into the state of Ihram (sacred state) for Hajj. Before making ʿUmrah, one approaches the Miqat and declares their intention. Ends by sacrificing an animal.
Ḥajj al-Qirān (القران)
At Miqat, to declare an intention to perform both Hajj and 'Umrah together. After throwing the Jamrah of Al-'Aqabah, getting hair shaved or cut that takes off his Ihram garments and sacrifices an animal.
Ḥajj al-ʾIfrād (الإفراد)
At Miqat, declare intention for Hajj only and maintain Ihram garments up to the Day of Sacrifice. No offering is required from them.
Ḥākim (حاكم)
A ruler's or governor's title; in some Muslim states, a judge. (See: Ahkam).
Ḥākimīya (حاكمية)
Sovereignty, governance.
Ḥalāl (حلال)
Lawful, permitted, good, beneficial, free from sin praiseworthy, honourable. Doing a halal action won't result in punishment in the Hereafter. (See: mustahabb, mandub).
Ḥalaqah (حلقة)
A gathering or meeting for the primary purpose of learning about Islam.
Ḥalq (حلق)
Shaving of the head, particularly associated with pilgrimage to Makkah (Mecca).
Ḥanīf (حنيف)
Pre-Islamic non-Jewish or non-Christian monotheists. Plural: ḥunafā' (حنفاء).
Ḥaqq (حقّ)
Truth, reality, right, righteousness. Al-Haqq is one of the 99 names of God.
Ḥarām (حرام)
Sinful.
Ḥaram (حرم)
Sanctuary or sacred, used for land in Makkah (Mecca) and its surrounding areas.{[rp|96}}
Ḥasan (حسن)
Good, beautiful, admirable. Also a categorization of a hadith's authenticity as "acceptable", other categorizations include authentic and fabricated.
Hawa (هوى) (pl. ʾahwāʾ (أهواء))
Vain or egotistical desire; individual passion; impulsiveness.
Hidāyah (هداية)
Guidance from God.
Ḥijāb (حجاب)
Literally: "cover". It describes the covering of the body for the purposes of modesty and dignity; broadly, a prescribed system of attitudes and behaviour regarding modesty and dignity. (See: abayah, al-amira, burqa, chador, jilbab, khimar, milfeh, niqab, purdah, shayla).
Hijra (الهجرة)
Literally: "migration". Refers to the emigration of Muhammad and his followers from Makkah (Mecca) to Medina. This marks the beginning of the Muslim New Year on the first day of the month of Muharram. See Rabi' al-awwal and the abbreviation AH.
Ḥikmah (also Hikmat) (حكمة)
Literally: "wisdom". Refers to the highest possible level of understanding attainable by a Muslim. In particular, it refers to the illuminative, mystical sort of wisdom that a Gnostic or Sufi might attain.
Hilāl (هلال)
Crescent moon.
Ḥima (حمى)
Wilderness reserve, protected forest, grazing commons; a concept of stewardship.
Ḥizb (حزب)
One half of a juz', or roughly 1/60th of the Qur'an.
Hudā (هدى)
Guidance.
Hudna (هدنة)
Truce, a cease-fire (often temporary).
Ḥudūd (حدود) (sing. hadd)
Literally: "limits" or "boundaries". Usually refers to limits placed by Allah on man; penalties of the Islamic law (Shari'ah) for particular crimes described in the Qur'an – intoxication, theft, rebellion, adultery and fornication, false accusation of adultery, and apostasy. (See: ta'zeer.)
Ḥukm (حكم)
A ruling in the Qur'an or Sunnah. Also spelled as Hukum.
Ḥūrī (حوريةḥūrīya; pl. ḥūrīyātحوريات)
Beautiful and pure young men and women that Muslims believe inhabit Paradise, or Heaven (Jannah).

== I ==
ʿIbādah (عبادة)
Submission, worship, but not limited to ritual: all expressions of servitude to Allah, including the pursuit of knowledge, living a pious life, helping, charity, and humility, all of which can be considered ibadah.
ʾIblīs (إبليس)
The Devil banished to Hell for his arrogance and disobedience; aka Satan.
ʿId (عيد)
Festival or celebration. Alternatively transliterated as Eid.
ʿId al-Adha (الأضحى)
"The Festival of Sacrifice." The four-day celebration starting on the tenth day of Dhu'l-Hijja.
ʿId al-Fitr (الفطر)
"The Festival of Fitr (Breaking the fast)." A religious festival that marks the end of the fast of Ramadan.
Iddah (Arabic: العدة)
Literally: "to count" or "counting." Used when referring to the waiting period for a woman after she is widowed or divorced before being allowed to remarry to ensure that she is not pregnant.
ʾIfṭār (إفطار)
A meal eaten by Muslims breaking their fast after sunset during the month of Ramadan.
ʾIḥrām (إحرام)
State of consecration for Hajj. Includes dress and/or prayer.
ʾIḥsān (إحسان)
Perfection in worship, such that Muslims try to worship God as if they see Him, and although they cannot see Him, they undoubtedly believe He is constantly watching over them.
ʾIḥtiyāṭ (إحتياط)
Also Ahwat. A precaution, either obligatory or optional.
ʾIḥtiyāṭ mustaḥabb(مستحبّ)
A preferred precaution.
ʾIḥtiyāṭ wājib(واجب)
An obligatory precaution.
ʾIʿjāz (إعجاز)
Miracle, the character of the Qur'an in both form and content.
ʾIjāzah (إجازة)
A certificate authorizing one to transmit a subject or text of Islamic knowledge.
ʾIjmā' (إجماع)
The consensus of either the ummah (or just the ulema) – one of four bases of Islamic Law. More generally, political consensus itself. The Shi'a substitute obedience to the Imam; opposite of ikhtilaf.
ʾIjtihād (اجتهاد)
During the early times of Islam, this referred to the possibility of finding a new solution to a juridical problem. Has not been allowed in conservative Islam since the Middle Ages. However, Liberal movements within Islam generally argue that any Muslim can perform ijtihad, given that Islam has no generally accepted clerical hierarchy or bureaucratic organization. The opposite of ijtihad is taqlid (تقليد), Arabic for "imitation".
ʾIkhtilāf (اختلاف)
Disagreement among the madhhabs (scholars) of a religious principle; opposite of ijma.
ʾIkrām (إكرام)
Honouring, hospitality, generosity – Dhul jalaali wal ikraam is one of the 99 names of Allah.
ʾIkrāh (إكراه)
Mental or physical force.
ʾIlāh (إله)
Deity, a god; includes gods worshiped by polytheists.
ʿIlm (علم)
All varieties of knowledge, usually a synonym for science.
ʾImām (إمام)
Literally: "leader"; e.g. a man who leads a community or leads the prayer; the Shi'a sect use the term only as a title for one of the twelve Allah-appointed successors of Muhammad.
ʾImāmah (إمامة) or imamate
Successorship of Muhammad and the leadership of mankind.
ʾImān (إيمان)
True and heartfelt faith.
ʾInna lilāhi wa ʾinna ʾilaihi rājiʿūn (إِنَّا لِلّهِ وَإِنَّـا إِلَيْهِ رَاجِعونَ)
"To Allah we belong and to Him is our return", a phrase said to mourners.
ʾInfāq (إنفاق)
The habitual inclination to give rather than take in life; the basis for charity.
ʾInjīl (الإنجيل)
Arabic term for the holy book called The Gospel, said to have been given to Jesus, who is known as Isa in Arabic; Muslims believe that the holy book has been corrupted and modified, and that the New Testament gospels (Matthew, Mark, Luke, and John) are not the word of Allah, only Christian stories about Jesus.
ʾIn shāʾa -llāh (إن شاء الله)
"If God wills"; Inshallah is "resigned, accepting, neutral, passive. It is neither optimistic nor pessimistic."
ʾIqāmah (إقامة)
The second call to prayer. Similar to the azhan.
ʾIrtidād (ارتداد)
Apostasy (see murtadd). Also riddah (ردة).
ʿĪsā (عيسى)
Jesus – 'Isa ibn Maryam (English: Jesus son of Mary), (a matronymic since he had no biological father). The Qur'an asserts that Allah has no sons and therefore, 'Isa is not the son of Allah. Muslims honor 'Isa as a nabi and rasul.
ʿIshā' (عشاء)
Night; the fifth salat prayer.
ʾIṣlāḥ (إصلاح)
Literally: "reform". This term may mean different things depending on the context. When used in reference to the reform of Islam, it may mean modernism, such as that proposed by Muhammad Abduh; or Salafi literalism, such as that preached by Muhammad Nasiruddin al-Albani.
ʾIslām (الإسلام)
"Submission to God". The Arabic root word for Islam means submission, obedience, peace, and purity.
ʾIsnād (إسناد)
The chain of transmitters of any given hadith.
ʾIsrāʾ (الإسراء)
The night journey during which Muhammad (محمّد) is said to have visited Heaven. (See: miraj).
ʾIstighfār (استغفار)
Requesting forgiveness.
ʾIstiḥādah (استحاضة)
Refers to vaginal bleeding, except for Haid and Nifas.
ʾIstiṣlāḥ (استصلاح)
Public interest – a source of Islamic Law.
ʾIstishhād (استشهاد)
Martyrdom.
ʾIthm (إثم)
Negative reward for bad deeds that is tallied on Qiyamah (Judgment day.) Opposite of thawab.
ʾIʿtikāf (إعتكاف)
Seclusion in the masjid (mosque) for the purpose of worship usually performed during the last 10 days of Ramadan.
ʾItmām al-hujjah (إتمام الحجة)
Clarification of truth in its ultimate form.
Ittaqullah (اتقوا الله)
Command to fear God or to be pious to Allah.

== J ==
Jāʾiz (جائز)
That which is allowed or permissible. As a rule, everything that is not prohibited is allowed. (See: halal, mustahabb, mandub).
Jahannam (جهنم)
Hell; purgatory.
Jāhilīyyah (الجاهليّة)
The time of ignorance before Islam was realized. Also describes polytheistic religions.
Jahl (جهل)
Ignorance, foolishness.
Jalsa (جلسة)
Sitting.
Jāmiʿah (جامعة)
Literally: "gathering"; i.e. a university, a masjid (mosque), or more generally, a community or association.
Janābah (جنابة)
A state of spiritual impurity that occurs due to sexual intercourse or ejaculation which necessitates major ritual ablution (ghusl).
Janāzah (جنازة)
Funeral. Ṣalāt al-Janāzah is a funeral prayer.
Jannah (جنة)
Paradise, Heaven, the Garden.
Jazāka-llāhu khayran (جزاك اللهُ خيرًا)
"May God reward you with good", an Islamic expression of gratitude.
Jihād (جهاد)
Struggle. Any earnest striving in the way of God, involving personal, physical, for righteousness and against wrongdoing.
Jihād aṣ-ṣaghīr (الصغير)
Offensive jihad as declared by the Caliph.
Jihād aṭ-ṭalab (الطلب)
Offensive jihad.
Jihād ad-dafʿa (الدفعة)
Defensive jihad.
Jihād bil-māl (بامال)
Financial jihad.
Jilbāb (جلباب)
(pl. jalabib) A long, flowing, garment worn by some as a more conservative means of fulfillment of sartorial hijab. (See also: abaya, niqab, chador.)
Jinn (جنّ)
A term referring to usually invisible living intelligent beings created from smokeless fire. These were created before humans and behave in a similar fashion. Can manifest as humans, usually in the animal form.
Jizya (جزية)
A tax specified in the Qur'an (9:29) to be paid by non-Muslim males living under Muslim political control.
Juḥod (جحود)
To deny, or Jaahid (the denier). Also refers to disbelief out of rejection. "When there comes to them that which they [should] have recognized, they refuse to believe in (kafaru) it" (Q. 2:89). Accordingly, juhud includes rejection (kufr at-taktheeb) and resistance (kufr al-'inaad).
Jumuʿah (جمعة)
Friday prayer or Sabbath.
Juzʾ (جزء)
One of the thirty parts of the Qur'an.

== K ==
Kaʿbah (الكعبة)
"Cube-house"; i.e., the cube-shaped building in Makkah (Mecca) which Muslims face to pray.
Kāfir - non-Muslim (كافرkāfir sing.; كفّار kuffār pl.)
From the word kafara, "to hide." Those who deliberately hide the truth; non-Muslims in Islamic or non-Islamic countries or states, unbelievers, truth-concealers; one who is ungrateful to God as per Islam. A common derogatory term used by different Islamic factions such as Sunni and Shi'a to denounce each other as non-Muslims. Plural: Kāfirūn. Commonly used as an offensive term for black people by white South Africans.
Kalām (الكلام) (ʿilm al-kalām)
Literally: "words" or "speech," and referring to oration. The name applied to the discipline of philosophy and theology concerned specifically with the nature of faith, determinism and freedom, and the nature of the divine attributes.
Khair (خير)
Every kind of good.
Khalīfah (خليفة)
Caliph, more generally, one performing the duties of khilafa.
Khalīl (خليل)
Devoted friend.
Khalq (خلق)
Creation – the act of measuring; determining, estimating and calculating. Khalq is the noun form of the verb khalaqa (see: bara, sawwara).
Al-khāliq (الخالق)
The Creator, Allah (God).
Khamr (خمر)
An intoxicant, wine.
Khatīb (خطيب)
The speaker at the Friday Muslim (Jumu'ah) prayer.
Khatm (ختم)
To finish - refers to the complete recitation of the Qur'an.
Kharāj (خراج)
A land tax.
Khayr
Goodness. See birr (righteousness), qist (equity), 'adl (equilibrium and justice), haqq (truth and right), ma'ruf (known and approved), taqwa (piety, awareness of God).
khilāf (خلاف)
Controversy, dispute, discord.
Khilāfah (خلافة)
Man's trusteeship and stewardship of the Earth; most basic theory of the Caliphate; flora and fauna as sacred trust; accountability to God for harms to nature, failure to actively care and maintain. Three specific ways in which khalifa is manifested in Muslim practice includes the creation of haram to protect water, hima to protect other species (including those useful to man), and by resisting infidel domination over Muslim lands, in jihad.
Khilwa, (خلوة)
An offense consisting of being caught alone in private with a member of the opposite sex who is not an immediate family member.
al-khulafāʾ ar-rāshidūn (الراشدون)
The first four Caliphs, believed by most Muslims to be most righteous rulers in history.
Khimār (خمار) (pl. khumur (خُمُر) or ʾakhmirah (أخْمِرة))
Headcovering (Q. 24:31).
Khitān (ختان)
Male circumcision.
Khuluq (خُلُق) pl. ʾakhlāq (أخلاق)
Ethics.
Khushūʿ (خشوع)
Humility, devotion, concentration (especially in prayer).
Khuṭbah (خطبة)
The sermon at the Jumu'ah prayer.
Kibr (كِبْر)
Pride, arrogance.
Kibar (كِبَر)
Old age.
Kitāb (كتاب)
Book; the Qurʾān is often referred to as "Al-Kitāb" (English: the Book).
Kufr (كفر)
Unbelief, infidelity, blasphemy; also hubris. (See: Kafir and Kuffar).
Kufr al-ḥukm (الحكم)
Disbelief from judgment.
Kufr al-ʿInād (العناد)
Disbelief out of stubbornness.
Kufr al-ʾInkār (الإنكار)
Disbelief out of arrogance and pride.
Kufr al-ʾIstibdāl (الإستبدال)
Disbelief because of an attempt to substitute Allah's Laws.
Kufr al-ʾIstiḥlāl (الإستحلال)
Disbelief out of trying to make haram into halal.
Kufrul-Istihzaha
Disbelief due to mockery and derision.
Kufr al-jahl (الجهل)
Disbelief from not being aware of or not understanding.
Kufr al-juhud (الجهد)
Disbelief from obstinacy after being presented with truth.
Kufr an-Nifāq (النفاق)
Disbelief out of hypocrisy.
Kufr al-ʾIʿrāḍ (الإعراض)
Disbelief due to avoidance.
Kun (كن)
God's command to the universe, 'Be!' is sufficient to create it.

== L ==
Lā ilāha illā-llāh (لَا إِلٰهَ إِلَّا الله)
"There is no god but God." The most important expression in Islam. It is part of the first Pillar of Islam. According to Islam, this is the message of all the Prophets, such as Ibrahim (Abraham), Musa (Moses), Isa (Jesus) and Muhammad.
Labbayka -llāhumma (لبّيكَ اللّهُم)
"God, I obey you", a phrase said during Hajj.
Laghw (لغو)
Dirty, false, evil and vain talk.
Laʿnah (لعنة)
Curse, execration, or imprecation.
Laylat al-Qadr (القدر)
The Night of Power, towards the end of Ramadan, when Muhammad received the first revelation of the Qur'an.

== M ==
Madhhab (مذهب)
pl. Madhāhib (مذاهب), school of religious jurisprudence (fiqh), school of thought.
Madrasah (مدرسة)
School, university.
Maghrib (مغرب)
The fourth daily salat prayer.
Mahdi (مهدي)
Literally: "a guide". More specifically, al-Mahdi (the guide) is a figure who will appear with Prophet Isa before the end of time, when God allows it, in order to bring world peace, order and justice, after it has been overcome with injustice and aggression.
Mahdūr ad-damm (الدم)
He whose blood must be wasted.
Maḥram (محرم)
A relative of the opposite gender usually described as being "within the forbidden limits" or "within the protected limits". Refers to relatives who one can appear before without observing hijab and who one cannot marry.
Maisir (ميسر)
Gambling, game of chance.
Makrūh (مكروه)
Means "detested", though not haram (forbidden); something that is disliked or offensive. If a person commits the Makruh, he does not accumulate ithim but avoiding the Makhruh is rewarded with thawab.
Malāʾikah (ملائكة)
Angels (Singular: Malak). Belief in angels is one of the Five Pillars of Islam and it is required for Muslims to believe in it.
Mā malakat ʾaymānukum (أيمانكم)
Literally: "what your right hands possess". Refers to one's rightful spouse.
Manāsik (مناسك)
The rules specifying the requirements of a legally valid Hajj.
Mandūb (مندوب)
Commendable or recommended. Failure to do it would not be a sin. (See: halal, mustahabb)
Manhaj (منهج)
The methodology by which truth is reached.
Mansūkh (منسوخ)
That which is abrogated. The doctrine of al-Nasikh wal-Mansukh (abrogation) of certain parts of the Qur'anic revelation by others. The principle is mentioned in the Qur'an (2:106), see naskh.
Manzil (منزل)
One of seven equal parts of the Qur'an.
Maʿrūf (معروف)
Consensus of the community.
Maqāṣid (مقاصد) sing. maqṣid (مقصد)
Goals or purposes; such as the purposes of Islamic law.
Maṣāliḥ (مصالح) sing. maṣlaḥah (مصلحة)
Public interests.
Masbuq (مَسْبُوق)
A person who is late for salat and has not joined the imam in the first rak'at.
Mā shāʾa -llāh (ما شاء الله)
"Allah has willed it", a common phrase expressing joy, praise.
Masīḥ (مسيح)
The (Biblical) Messiah, prophet Isa (Jesus Christ).
Masjid (مسجد) pl. masājid, مساجد
Place of prayer; mosque.
Masjid al-Ḥarām (الحرام)
The mosque surrounding the Kaʿbah in Makkah (Mecca).
Mawālī or mawālā (موالي)
Non-Arab Muslims.
Mawlā [mawlan (مولى)] [pl. mawālin (موالٍ)]
Protector or master.
Mawlānā (مولانا)
An Arabic word meaning: "our master" (not literally). It is used mostly as a title preceding the name of a respected religious leader in particular graduates of religious institutions. The term is sometimes used to refer to Rumi.
Maulvi (مولوی)
An honorific Islamic religious title often, but not exclusively, given to Muslim religious scholars or Ulama preceding their names. Maulvi generally means any religious cleric or teacher.
Mecca (مكّة Makkah)
The holiest city in Islam.
Medina (مدينة Madīnah)
Literally: "city"; Medinat-un-Nabi means "the City of the Prophet." See Hijra (Islam)
Mi'ād (معاد)
The Resurrection; God will resurrect all of humankind to be judged. Shi'as regard this as the fifth Pillar of Islam.
Miḥrāb (محراب)
A niche in the wall of all mosques, indicating the direction of prayer.
Millah (مِلَّة)
In Arabic, millah means "religion," but it has only been used to refer to religions other than Islam, which is din.
Millet
A Turkish word meaning a nation, community, or a people. In an Islamic state, "Ahl al Kitab" may continue to practice their former religion in a semi-autonomous community termed the millet. Also see Millah.
Minaret (منارة)
A tower built onto a masjid (mosque) from where the call to prayer is made.
Minbar (منبر)
A raised pulpit in the mosque where the Imam stands to deliver sermons.
Minhaj (منهج)
Methodology, e.g. methods, rules, system, procedures.
Mīqāt (ميقات)
Intended place.
Miʿrāj (المعراج)
The Ascension to the Seven Heavens during the Night Journey (See also: Al-Isra).
Mohyeddin (محی‌الدین)
A religious title given to people for their efforts to bring new life to the spiritual aspects of Islam.
Mosque (مسجد)
A Muslim place of worship (see: masjid).
Muʾadhdhin (مأذن)
A person who performs the call to prayer.
Muʿāhadāt (معاهدات)
Treaties.
Muʿawwidhatayn (المعوذتين)
Suras Al-Falaq and an-Nas, the "Surahs of refuge", should be said to relieve suffering (also to protect from Black Magic).
Mubāḥ (مباح)
Literally: "permissible"; neither forbidden nor commended, neutral. (See: halal).
Mubaligh (مبلغ)
A person who recites Qur'an.
Mufassir (مُفسّر)
Qualified exegete of the Qur'an.
Muftī (مفتى)
An Islamic scholar who is an interpreter or expounder of Islamic law (Shari'ah), capable of issuing fatawa (plural of fatwa).
Muḥajjabah (محجبة)
A woman who wears a hijab.
Muḥkamāt
Unequivocal verses of the Qur'an. (See: mutashabehat).
Muḥāribah (محاربة)
A person who wages war against God.
Muḥammadun rasūl allāh (محمدٌ رسول الله)
"Muhammad is the messenger of God." This statement is the second part of the first Pillar of Islam, and it is the second most important statement in Islam. It forms the second half of the Shahada.
Mufsid (مفسد)
An evil-doer, a person who spreads corruption not in accordance with Islam. Plural: mufsideen.
Muḥsin (محسن)
A person who performs good deeds. Plural: muhsineen. Opposite of Mufsidun.
Muhājirūn (مهاجرون)
The first Muslims that accompanied Muhammad when he traveled to Medina.
Muharṭiq (مهرطق)
Heretic.
Mujāhid (مجاهد)
A fighter for Islam. Plural: Mujāhidūn (مجاهدون).
Mujtahid (مجتهد)
A scholar who uses reason for the purpose of forming an opinion or making a ruling on a religious issue. Plural: Mujtahidun.
Mullah (ملا)
Refers to Islamic clergy. Ideally, they should have studied the Qur'an, Islamic traditions (hadith), and Islamic law (fiqh).
Muʾmin (مؤمن)
A Muslim who observes the commandments of the Qur'an.
Munāfiq (منافق)
A hypocrite. Plural: Munafiqun.
Muntaiabah (منتقبة) pl. muntaqibāt (منتقبات)
A woman who wears the niqab.
Muqarrabin (مقربين)
"Those who are near", an archangel.
Murābaḥah ( مرابحة)
A type of Shari'ah-compliant mortgage (see Ijara).
Murshid (مرشد)
A Sufi teacher.
Murtadd (مرتد), a female apostate is Murtaddah
Apostate. (See: irtidad, mahdur ad-damm).
Muṣḥaf (مصحف)
A copy, codex or redaction of the Qur'an.
Mushrik (مشرك)(pl. mushrikūn) (مشركون)
One who associates others in worship with God; a polytheist.
Muslim (مسلم)
A follower of the religion of Islam, one who submits their will to God (Allah).
Mustaḥabb (مستحبّ)
Commendable or recommended. (See halal, mandub).
Mutʿah (متعة)
Literally: "enjoyment"; compensation paid to a divorced woman; when used in the phrase nikāḥ al-mutʿah (المتعة) it refers to the temporary marriage that is practiced in Twelver Shi'a Islam.
Mutashābihāt (متشابهات)
Equivocal verses of Qur'an. (See Muhakkamat.)
Mutaʿaṣṣibūn (متعصّبون)
Fanatics.
Muṭawwaʿ (مطوّع) plural muṭawwaʿūn (مطوّعون)
A religious man in certain regions, a volunteer teacher.
Muṭawwaʿūn (مطوّعون) (مطوعين) (singular muṭawwaʿ)
Religious police.
Mutawātir (متواتر)
"Agreed upon", used to describe hadith that were narrated by many witnesses through different narration chains (isnads) leading back to Muhammad.

== N ==
Nabī (نبي)
Literally: "prophets". In the Islamic context, a Nabi is a man sent by God to give guidance to man, but not given scripture. The Prophet Abraham was a Nabi. This is in contrast to a Rasul, or Messenger. Plural: Anbiya. See Rasul.
Nafs (النفس)
Soul, the lower self, the ego/id.
Nāfilah (نافلة)
An optional, supererogatory practice of worship, in contrast to farida.
Najāsah (نجاسة)
Impurity.
Nājis (ناجس)
Impure.
Nakīr and Munkar (منكر)
Two angels who test the faith of the dead in their graves.
Namāz (نماز)
Ritual Prayer in Turkish and Persian language.
Nashīd (نشيد)
A popular type of a cappella in Islamic culture.
Naṣīḥa (نصيحة)
Advice.
Naskh (نسخ)
The doctrine of al-Nasikh wal-Mansukh (abrogation) of certain parts of the Qur'anic revelation by others. The principle is mentioned in the Qur'an (2:106), see mansukh.
Naṣṣ (نصّ)
A known, clear legal injunction.
Nifās (نفاس)
The bleeding after childbirth (see Haid).
Nifāq (نفاق)
Falsehood; dishonesty; hypocrisy.
Nihāļ (نحال)
An Arabic name meaning: "joyful."
Nikāḥ (النكاح)
The matrimonial contract between a bride and bridegroom within an Islamic marriage.
Niqāb (نقاب)
A veil covering the face.
Niyyah (نية)
Intention.
Nubūwwah (نبوّة)
Prophethood. Shi'a regard this as the third Pillar of Islam.
Nukrah
A great munkar, a prohibited, evil, dreadful thing.
Nūr (نور)
Light, more theological connoted than daw', the proper term for light in Arabic. Nur is often associated with benevolence, such as the Light of Muhammad and angels of mercy as created from nur. The term is closely associated with nar, which denotes the burning light of fire, often associated with fierce forces, like the angels of punishment, demons and Hell.

== P ==
P.B.U.H.
An acronym that stands for "peace be upon him", a blessing which is affixed to Muhammad's name whenever it is written. In some circles and English writings, Sufis regard PBUH to signify "Peace and Blessings Upon Him" (the Rasul or Messenger of Allah). These are the primary English explications of the P.B.U.H. acronym. The Arabic version is S.A.W.

== Q ==
Qadhf (قذف)
False imputation of unchastity specifically punished by Shari'ah.
Qadar (قدر)
Predestination.
Qāḍī (قاضي)
A Judge of Islamic Law.
Qalb (قلب)
Heart, considered the center of the self in Islamic anthropology.
Qiblah (قبلة)
The direction Muslims face during prayer, which is towards the Ka'aba in Makkah (Mecca).
Qitāl fī sabīl allāh ( قتال في سبيل الله)
Fight in the cause of Allah.
Qiyāmah (قيامة)
Resurrection; return of the dead for the Day of Judgment.
Qiṣāṣ (قصاص)
Equitable retribution, a fine for murder if the heirs forgive the perpetrator. (See: hudud, tazeer).
Qiyām (قيام)
To stand, a position of salat prayer.
Qiyās (القياس)
Analogy – foundation of legal reasoning and thus fiqh.
Qudsī (قدسي)
Classification of a hadith that is believed to be narrated by Muhammad from God.
Qurbah (قربة)
Closeness to God, associated with Sufism.
Qurʾān (القرآن)
The word Qur'an means recitation. Muslims believe the Qur'an (Koran) to be the literal word of God and the culmination of God's revelation to mankind, revealed to Muhammad in the year AD 610 in the cave Hira by the angel Jibril (Gabriel).

== R ==
Rabb (ربّ)
Lord, Sustainer, Cherisher, Master.
R. A., raḍiya -llāhu ʿanhu (عنه)
"May Allah be pleased with him". Variants are ʿanhā (her) and ʿanhum (them).
Raḥmān (رحمن)
Merciful; Ar-Rahman (الرحمن) means: "The Most Merciful".
Raḥīm (رحيم)
Compassionate; Ar-Rahim (الرحيم) means "The Most Compassionate", as seen in the Basmala ("Bismillāh al-Raḥmān al-Raḥīm").
Raḥimaḥullāh (رحمه الله)
"May Allah have mercy on him". Usually used after mentioning the companions of Muhammad.
Raḥmatullāh (رحمة الله)
Mercy of Allah. Sometimes used as an alternative to Rahimahullah after mentioning a righteous person by saying, "rahmatullahi ʿilayh" (رحمة الله علیه). English: "Mercy of Allah be upon him/her".
Rajm (رجم)
Stoning or banishment, used as an epithet for devils in some Islamic prayers.
Rakʿah (ركعة)
One unit of Islamic prayer, or Salat. Each daily prayer is made up of a different number of raka'ah.
Ramaḍān (رمضان)
The month of fasting when the Qur'an was first revealed. Spelt as Ramzaan, Ramadhan, or Ramathan as well.
Rāshidūn (راشدون)
Sunnis consider the first four caliphs as the "orthodox" or "rightly guided" caliphs. They were Abu Bakr, 'Umar, 'Uthman and 'Ali.
Rasūl (رسول)
Messenger; unlike prophets (Nabi), messengers are given scripture. Musa (Moses), Dawud (David), Isa (Jesus) and Muhammed are considered messengers. All messengers are considered prophets, but not all prophets are given scripture. (See: Nabi).
Riba (ربا)
Interest, the charging and paying of which is forbidden by the Qur'an.
Ribat
Guarding Muslims from infidels.
Riddah (ردة)
Apostasy, in which a person abandons Islam for another faith or no faith at all.
Risālah (رِسَالَة)
Literally: "message" or "letter". Used both in common parlance for mail correspondences, and in a religious context, as a divine message.
Rūḥ (روح)
Spirit; the divine breath which God blew into the clay of Adam. Sometimes used interchangeable with nafs; otherwise distinguished and identified with the sublime parts of human's soul.
Rukn (ركن) plural ʾArkān (أركان)
"What is inevitable", one of the Five pillars of Islam. (See fard, wajib).
Rukūʿ (ركوع)
The bowing performed during salat.

== S ==
Sabb (سَبّ)
Blasphemy: insulting God (sabb Allah) or Muhammad (sabb ar-rasūl or sabb an-nabī).
Ṣabr (صبر)
Patience, endurance, self-restraint.
Ṣadaqah (صدقة)
Charity; voluntary alms above the amount for zakat.
Ṣaḥābah (الصحابة) (sing. Ṣāḥib) (صاحب)
Companions of Muhammad. A list of the best-known Companions can be found at the article: List of companions of Muhammad.
Ṣāḥīḥ (صحيح)
"Sound in isnad." A technical attribute applied to the "isnad" of a hadith.
Sakīnah (سكينة)
Divine "tranquility" or "peace" which descends upon a person when the Qur'an is recited.
Salaf (الصالح)
(Righteous) predecessors/ancestors. In Islam, Salaf is generally used to refer to the first three generations of Muslims. Anyone who died after this is one of the khalaf, or "latter-day Muslims".
Salafism
A reform movement, basing Islamic teachings on Qur'an and Sunnah alone. Contrary to Classical Sunnism, it disregards former established consensus and the opinions of the Sahaba.
Ṣalāt (صلاة) sala(t)
Any one of the daily five obligatory prayers. Sunnis regard this as the second Pillar of Islam.
Salaat al-Istikharah
Prayer for guidance is done in conjunction with two rakaahs of supererogatory prayer.
Salām (سلام)
Peace (see sulh).
Sallallahu alayhi wa sallam (سلم)
"May Allah bless him and grant him peace." The expression is often used after Muhammad's name. See abbreviation: S.A.W. or S.A.W.S. also P.B.U.H.
Ṣamad (صمد)
Eternal, absolute; Muslims believe Allah is "The Eternal."
Salsabīl (سلسبيل)
A river in heaven (al-firdaus).
Sawa
Awakening, revival.
S.A.W. (or S.A.W.S.)
"Sallallahu alayhi wa sallam" (سلم). See P.B.U.H.
Ṣawm (صَوم)
Fasting during the month of Ramadan. The word sawm is derived from the Syriac word sawmo.
Sayyid (سيّد, also spelled Seyed)
In everyday usage, it is equivalent to 'Mr.'. Also refers to a descendant of a relative of Muhammad, usually via Husayn.
Seghatoleslam (ثقة الاسلام),(ثقت الاسلام)
"Trustworthy of Islam", a title given to religious scholars in Shi'a sect.
Sema
Refers to some of the ceremonies used by various Sufi orders.
Shahādah (الشهادة)
The testimony of faith: "La ilaha illa Allah. Muhammadun rasulullah". (English: "There is no god but Allah. Muhammad is the messenger of Allah."). Formal conversion to Islam is done by the recitation of the Shahada. Sunnis regard this as the first Pillar of Islam, while Shi'as also add an optional third statement, "Ali is the wali of God" ("Wa ʿaliyyun waliyyu llāh"). It also may be used as a synonym for the term Istish'hād, meaning martyrdom.
Shahīd (شهيد) pl. shuhadāʾ (شهداء)
Witness, martyr. Usually refers to a person killed whilst fighting in "jihād fī sabīl Allāh" (jihad for the sake of Allah). Often used in modern times for deaths in a political cause (including victims of soldiers, deaths in battle, etc.) which are viewed by some Muslims as a spiritual cause, not just as a political cause. But the real meaning of jihad is to defend Islam in any way; thus, it could be in an economic way or it could refer to fighting for the rights of the oppressed or the believers; most often it refers to mastering one's own inclination for evil and shirk.
Shaykh (شيخ)
A spiritual master, Muslim clergy.
Sharīʿah (الشريعة)
"The path to a watering hole"; Islamic law; the eternal ethical code and moral code based on the Qur'an, Sunnah, Ijma, and Qiyas; basis of Islamic jurisprudence (fiqh).
Sharīf (شريف)
A title bestowed upon the descendants of Muhammad through Hasan, the son of his daughter Fatima Zahra and son-in-law Ali ibn Abi Talib.
Shayṭān (شيطان)
An evil being; a devil. With the article Al- it designates Satan (Iblis) in particular. In plural, it designates an indefined host of evil spirits; devils. Also applied to evil humans and evil jinn.
Shīʿah (الشيعة)
A branch of Islam who believe in Imam Ali and his sons (Hassan and Hussayn) as the custodians of Islam by the will of Muhammed.
Shirk (شرك)
Idolatry; polytheism; the sin of believing in any divinity except God and of associating other gods with God.
Shūrā (شورى)
Consultation.
Majlis ash-shūrā (الشورى)
An advisory council in a Caliphate.
Sidrat al-Muntaha (المنتهى)
A lotus tree that marks the end of the seventh heaven, the boundary where no creation can pass.
Sīrah (السيرة)
Life or biography of Muhammad; his moral example – along with hadith, this comprises the sunnah.
aṣ-Ṣirāṭ al-mustaqīm ( المستقيم)
The Straight Path.
Subah Sadiq
True dawn.
Subḥānahu wa taʿāla (تعالى) (abbreviated as 'Italic text'S.W.T.)
An expression used following the written name or vocalization of Allah in Arabic, meaning "highly praised and glorified is He".
Subḥān allāh (سبحان الله)
"Glory to God" – this phrase is often used when praising God or exclaiming awe at His attributes, bounties, or creation.
Ṣūfī (صوفي)
A Muslim mystic; see: Sufism (tasawwuf).
Suḥūr (سحور)
The meal eaten by fasting Muslims just before dawn.
Sujūd (سجود)
Kneeling down, a position of salat.
Ṣukūk (صكوك)
Bond that generates revenue from sales, profits, or leases rather than interest.
Ṣulḥ (صلح)
A condition of peace, an armistice, or treaty. It is related to the word muṣālaḥah (مصالحة) which means peace, conciliation, or compromise.
Sunnah (السنّة) or sunnat an-Nabī (سنّة النبي)
The "path" or "example" of Muhammad, i.e., what he did or said or agreed to during his life. He is considered by Muslims to be the best human moral example. Also refers to optional good deeds, such as pious deeds and voluntary ritual prayers.
Sunni (سنّي)
The largest denomination of Islam. The word Sunni comes from the word Sunnah (Arabic: سنة), which refers to the words and actions or example of the Islamic Prophet Muhammad.
Sūrah (سورة)
Chapter.

== T ==
Taʿāla (تعالى)
Almighty.
Tābiʿīn (التابعون)
Followers of the Ṣaḥābah.
Tafsīr (تفسير)
Exegesis, particularly such commentary on the Qur'an.
Ṭāghūt (طاغوت) (taghout)
"False god" or idol; also tyranny.
Tahajjud (تهجُّد)
Optional (supererogatory), late-night (pre-dawn) prayer.
Ṭahārah (طهارة)
Purification from ritual impurities by means of wudu or ghusl.
Ṭāhir (طاهر)
Pure, ritually clean.
Tahlīl (تهليل)
Uttering the formula of faith: "Lā ilāha illā -llāh", English: "There is no god but God". Forms the first half of the Shahada.
Tahmid (تحميد)
To praise Allah or to say, "Alhamdillah". It derives from the same root as Muhammad, mahmud and hamid (hmd) which means praise in Arabic.
Taḥnīk (تحنيك)
An Islamic ceremony of touching the lips of a newborn baby with honey, sweet juice or pressed dates.
Taḥrīf (تحريف)
Corruption, forgery. Muslims believe the Bible Scriptures (Injil) were corrupted but the Qur'an is in its original form.
Tajdīd (تجديد)
Literally: "to make new" in the present tense. To purify and reform society in order to move it toward greater equity and justice.
Tajdīf (تجديف)
Blasphemy.
Tajwīd (تجويد)
A special manner of reciting the Qur'an according to prescribed rules of pronunciation and intonation.
Takāful ( التكافل)
Based on Shari'ah (Islamic law), it is a form of mutual insurance. (See: retakaful).
Takbīr (تكبير)
A proclamation of the greatness of Allah; a Muslim invocation.
takhsis (ثخصص, also takhsees)
In fiqh, a qualification of a general ruling ['aam] so that it only applies in certain cases.
Takfīr (تكفير)
Declaration of an individual or group of previously considered Muslim as kaffir.
Takhrīj (الحديث)
The science of hadith extraction and authentication, including validation of chains of transmitters of a hadith by this science's scholars and grading hadith validity.
Takweeni (تکوینیة)
Ontological.
Ṭalāq (الطلاق)
Divorce.
Taqalan
Accountable ones; those who are responsible for their deeds (humans and jinn). They are in opposition to angels and devils, those deeds and destiny are prescribed.
Taqdīr (تقدير)
Fate, predestination.
Taqlīd (تقليد)
To follow the scholarly opinion of one of the four Imams (madhhab) of Islamic Jurisprudence (fiqh).
Taqīyyah (تقيّة)
"Precaution", that one is allowed to hide his true beliefs in certain circumstances or to lie to save himself from being killed or harmed.
Taqwa (تقوى)
Righteousness; goodness; piety. Taqwa is taken from the verbe Ittaqua, which means "avoiding", fearing the punishment from Allah for committing sins. It is piety obtained by fearing the punishment of Allah.
Tarāwīḥ (تراويح)
Extra prayers in Ramadan after the Isha prayer.
Tarkīb (تَرْكِيب)
The study of Arabic grammar issued from the Qur'an.
Ṭarīqah (طريقة)
A Muslim religious order, particularly a Sufi order.
Tartīl (ترتيل)
Slow, meditative recitation of the Qur'an.
Taṣawwuf (التصوّف) or Sufism
Tasbīḥ (تسبيح)
Uttering the phrase: "Subhan Allah", English: "Glory be to Allah".
Taṣdīq (تصديق)
"The evaluation of the degree of iman" (belief), proof of iman; Tasdiq is proved by "acceptance of what the prophets brought down" by Islamic works and deeds, "which in turn are used to evaluate the level of iman".
Tashkīl (تشكيل)
Literally: "to form" or "arrange". Vocalization of Arabic text by means of diacritical marks. Forms an integral part of the Arabic writing system.
Taslīm (تسليم)
Salutation at the end of prayer.
Taṭbīr (تطبير)
Shi'a Ashura ceremony of self-flagellation by hitting the head with a sword.
Tawafuq (توافق)
God-conscious understanding of a phenomenon.
Tawakkul (توکل)
Total reliance on Allah.
Tawassul (توسُّل)
Asking Allah Almighty through the medium and intercession of another person.
Ṭawāf (طواف)
Circumambulating the Ka'bah during Hajj.
Tawfiq (توفیق)
Divine help in getting to the purpose to one who deserves.
Tawbah (توبة)
Repentance.
Tawḥīd (توحيد)
Monotheism; affirmation of the Oneness of Allah. Muslims regard this as the first part of the Pillar of Islam, the second part is accepting Muhammad as rasoul (messenger). The opposite of tawheed is shirk.
Ta'weel (تأويلة)
Explanation and elucidation, how something will occur and its result, or figurative interpretation.
Tawrāh (توراة)
The Torah as revealed to Musa (Moses).
Ṭayyib (طيِّب)
All that is good as regards things, deeds, beliefs, persons, foods, etc. Means "pure." The Shahaddath is tayyib.
Taʿzīr (تعزير)
Discretionary punishment – a sentence or punishment whose measure is not fixed by the Shari'ah. (See: hudud, qisas).
Tazkīyah (تزكية)
Purification of the Soul.
Thawāb (ثواب)
Reward for good deeds that is tallied on qiyamah (Judgment day.) Opposite of ithim.
Tilāwah (تلاوة)
Ritual recitation of passages of the Qur'an.
Ṭumaʾnīnah (طمأنينة)
State of motionlessness, calm.

== U ==
ʿUbūdīyah (عبودية)
Worship.
ʾUḍḥīyah (أضحية)
Sacrifice.
ʿUlamāʾ (علماء) or ulema
The leaders of Islamic society, including teachers, Imamss and judges. Singular: alim.
ʾUmmah (الاُمّة) or umma
Literally: "nation", the global community of all Muslim believers.
ʿUmrah (عمرة)
The lesser pilgrimage performed in Makkah (Mecca). Unlike Hajj, ʿumrah can be performed throughout the year.
ʿUqūbah (عقوبة)
The branch of Shari'ah that deals with punishment. (See: hudud, qisas, tazeer).
ʿUrf (عرف)
Custom of a given society, leading to change in the fiqh.
ʾUṣūl (أُصول) (sing. ʾaṣl)(أصل)
Principles, origins.
ʾUṣūl al-Fiqh (الفقه)
The study of the origins and practice of Islamic jurisprudence (fiqh).

== W ==
Wa ʿalaykum as-salām (وعليكم السلام)
"Wa 'Alaykum as-Salaam!", meaning: "and upon you be peace", which is the answer to the greeting As-Salamu Alaykum.
Wafāt (وفاة)
Death. Barah-wafat: Muhammad was born on the twelfth day of Rabi-ul-Awwal, the third month of the Muslim year. His death anniversary also falls on the same day, the word 'barah' standing for the twelve days of Muhammad's sickness.
Waḥdat al-wujūd (الوجود)
"Unity of being". Philosophical term used by some Sufis. Related to fanaa.
Waḥy (وحی)
Revelation of God to His prophets for all humankind.
Wahn (وهن)
Literally: "weakness" or "feebleness". According to one hadith, Muhammad explained it as the "love of the world and dislike of death".
Wājib (واجب)
Obligatory or mandatory. (See: fard).
Walī (ولي)
Friend, protector, guardian, supporter, helper.
Waqf (وقف)
An endowment of money or property: the return or yield is typically dedicated toward a certain end; for example, to the maintenance of the poor, a family, a village, or a mosque. Plural: awqaf.
Warrāq (ورّاق)
Traditional scribe, publisher, printer, notary and book copier.
Wasaṭ (وسط)
The middle way, justly balanced, avoiding extremes, moderation.
Wasīlah (وسيلة)
The means by which one achieves nearness to Allah (see: tawassul).
Witr (وتر)
A voluntary, optional night prayer of odd numbers rakaats.
Wuḍūʾ (الوضوء)
Ablution for ritual purification from minor impurities before salat (see: ghusl).

== Y ==
Yā Allāh (یا الله)
"O, God!"
Ya Rasūl Allāh (یا رسول الله)
"O, Messenger of God!" Term used by companions when interacting with Muhammad.
Yaʾjūj wa-Maʾjūj (ومأجوج)
Ya'jūj wa-Ma'jūj is the Islamic counterpart of Gog and Magog.
Yaqīn (يقين)
Certainty, that which is certain.
Yarḥamuk-Allāh (يرحمك الله)
"May God have mercy on you", said when someone sneezes; the same as "(God) bless you" in English.
Allāh Yarḥamuhu (يرحمه), fem. yarḥamuhā (يرحمها)
"May God have mercy of his/her soul", said when someone dies.
Yawm ad-Dīn (الدين)
Day of Reckoning, Awe.
Yawm al-Ghaḍab (الغضب)
Day of Rage, Wrath.
Yawm al-Qiyāmah (القيامة)
"Day of the Resurrection"; Day of Judgement.

== Z ==
Zabūr (زبور)
The Psalms revealed to Daoud (King David) السلام.
Zabīḥa (Dhabīḥah) (ذَبِيْحَة) see dhabiha
Islamic method of slaughtering an animal, required for the meat to be halal. Using a sharp knife, the animal's windpipe, throat, and blood vessels of the neck are severed without cutting the spinal cord to ensure that the blood is thoroughly drained before removing the head.
Ẓāhir (ظاهر)
Exterior meaning.
Zaidi (الزيدية)
Islamic sub-sect of Shi'a, popularly found in Yemen, with similarities to Sunni Islam.
Zakāt (زكاة), Al-Māl
Tax, alms, tithe as a Muslim duty; Sunnis regard this as the fourth Pillar of Islam. It is neither charity nor is it derived from Islamic economics, but instead it is a religious duty and social obligation.
Zakāt al-Fiṭr (الفطر)
Charity given at the end of Ramadan.
Ẓālimūn (ظالمون)
Polytheists, wrong-doers, and unjust.
Zandaqa (زندقة)
Heresy.
Zināʾ (زناء, زنى)
Sexual activity outside of marriage (covering the English words adultery and fornication).
Zindīq (زنديق)
Heretic, atheist.
Zulfiqar (Dhu-l-fiqār) (الفقار)
Sword of Ali, presented to him by Muhammad.
Zuhr
Midday Islamic prayer.

== Explanatory notes ==
- Arabic words are created from three-letter "roots" which convey a basic idea. For example, k-t-b conveys the idea of writing. Addition of other letters before, between, or after the root letters produces many associated words: not only "write", but also "book", "office", "library", and "author". The abstract consonantal root for Islam is s-l-m.
- The English word algorithm is derived from the name of the inventor of algebra; similarly Arabic words like alchemy, alcohol, azimuth, nadir, zenith and oasis, which mean the same as in English. Arabic numerals are what we use in English ("0", "1", "2",...)
- Some Islamic concepts are usually referred to in Persian or Turkic. Those are typically of later origin than the concepts listed here; for completeness it may be best to list Persian terms and those unique to Shi'a on their own page, likewise Turkic terms and those unique to the Ottoman period on their own page, as these are culturally very distinct.
- The word "crusade" in English is usually translated in Arabic as "ḥamlah ṣalībīyah" which means literally "campaign of Cross-holders" (or close to that meaning). In Arabic text it is "صليبية" and the second word comes from "ṣalīb" which means "cross."

== See also ==
- 99 Names of God
- Arabic Ontology
- History of Islam
- Islamic eschatology
- List of Christian terms in Arabic
- List of English words of Arabic origin
- Prophets of Islam
