= Wahn =

Wahn may refer to:

- Wahn (beetle), an insect in the tribe Obriini
- Wahn, Cologne, a borough in Porz, Cologne, Germany
- Ian Wahn (1916–1999), Canadian politician
- An Islamic term in Arabic meaning weakness or feebleness
- A track by Tangerine Dream from the 1973 album Atem
- A Kulin name for Crow, a trickster in Australian Aboriginal mythology
