= Obrium cicatricosum =

Scientific classification
- Kingdom: Animalia
- Phylum: Arthropoda
- Clade: Pancrustacea
- Class: Insecta
- Order: Coleoptera
- Suborder: Polyphaga
- Infraorder: Cucujiformia
- Family: Cerambycidae
- Genus: Obrium
- Species: O. cicatricosum

Binomial name
- Obrium cicatricosum Gounelle, 1909

Species of beetle

Obrium cicatricosum is a species of beetle in the family Cerambycidae. It was described by Gounelle in 1909.
