= Obrium californicum =

Scientific classification
- Kingdom: Animalia
- Phylum: Arthropoda
- Clade: Pancrustacea
- Class: Insecta
- Order: Coleoptera
- Suborder: Polyphaga
- Infraorder: Cucujiformia
- Family: Cerambycidae
- Genus: Obrium
- Species: O. californicum

Binomial name
- Obrium californicum Van Dyke, 1920

Species of beetle

Obrium californicum is a species of beetle in the family Cerambycidae. It was described by Van Dyke in 1920.
