= Obrium latecinctum =

Scientific classification
- Kingdom: Animalia
- Phylum: Arthropoda
- Clade: Pancrustacea
- Class: Insecta
- Order: Coleoptera
- Suborder: Polyphaga
- Infraorder: Cucujiformia
- Family: Cerambycidae
- Genus: Obrium
- Species: O. latecinctum

Binomial name
- Obrium latecinctum Joly, 2010

Species of beetle

Obrium latecinctum is a species of beetle in the family Cerambycidae. It was described by Joly in 2010.
