= Obrium peculiare =

Scientific classification
- Kingdom: Animalia
- Phylum: Arthropoda
- Clade: Pancrustacea
- Class: Insecta
- Order: Coleoptera
- Suborder: Polyphaga
- Infraorder: Cucujiformia
- Family: Cerambycidae
- Genus: Obrium
- Species: O. peculiare

Binomial name
- Obrium peculiare Martins & Galileo, 2011

Species of beetle

Obrium peculiare is a species of beetle in the family Cerambycidae. It was described by Martins and Galileo in 2011.
