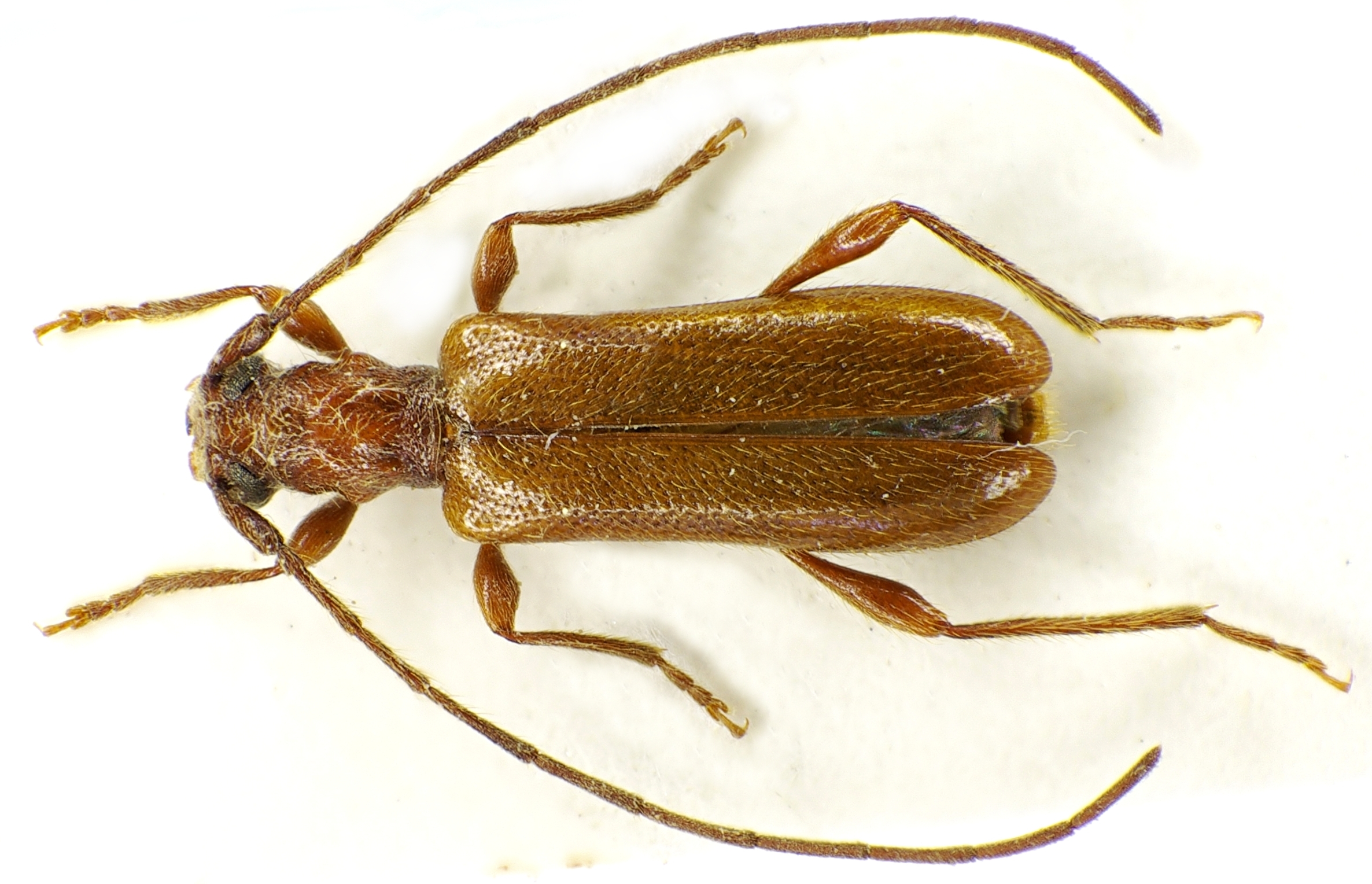
- Obrium brunneum

Scientific classification
- Kingdom: Animalia
- Phylum: Arthropoda
- Class: Insecta
- Order: Coleoptera
- Suborder: Polyphaga
- Infraorder: Cucujiformia
- Family: Cerambycidae
- Subfamily: Cerambycinae
- Tribe: Obriini; Dejean, 1821

= Obriini =

Tribe of beetles

Obriini is a tribe of beetles in the subfamily Cerambycinae

== Genera ==
The following are included in BioLib.cz:

1. Agnitosternum Jordan, 1894
2. Anatolobrium Adlbauer, 2004
3. Anisogaster Deyrolle, 1863
4. Bolivarita Escalera, 1914
5. Calobrium Fairmaire, 1903
6. Capobrium Adlbauer, 2006
7. Chinobrium Gressitt, 1937
8. Clavobrium Adlbauer, 2008
9. Comusia Thomson, 1864
10. Conobrium Aurivillius, 1927
11. Cylindobrium Adlbauer, 2012
12. Duffyoemida Martins, 1977
13. Falsallophyton Lepesme, 1953
14. Hologaster Vinson, 1961
15. Hypomares Thomson, 1864
16. Ibidiomimus Pic, 1922
17. Ibidionidum Gahan, 1894
18. Idobrium Kolbe, 1902
19. Indapiodes Miroshnikov & Tichý, 2018
20. Iphra Pascoe, 1869
21. Iranobrium Villiers, 1967
22. Kuegleria Holzschuh, 2017
23. Laosobrium Holzschuh, 2007
24. Longipalpus Montrouzier, 1861
25. Macrobium Gouverneur, 2021
26. Mythozoum Thomson, 1878
27. Nitidobrium Adlbauer, 2009
28. Obrioclytus Adlbauer, 2000
29. Obrium Dejean, 1821
30. Oculobrium Adlbauer, 2004
31. Oemida Gahan, 1904
32. Ossibia Pascoe, 1867
33. Oxilus Buquet, 1856
34. Pseudiphra Gressitt, 1935
35. Pseudobolivarita Sama & Orbach, 2003
36. Pseudoculobrium Adlbauer, 2010
37. Puchneriana Adlbauer, 2015
38. Spathuliger Vinson, 1961
39. Spiniphra Hayashi, 1961
40. Stenhomalus White, 1855
41. Synobrium Kolbe, 1893
42. Tillomimus Dillon & Dillon, 1952
43. Transvaalobrium Adlbauer, 2001
44. Uenobrium Niisato, 2006
45. Wahn (beetle) McKeown, 1940
46. Weigeliella Holzschuh, 2017
47. Yemenobrium Adlbauer, 2005
48. Zimbabobrium Adlbauer, 2000
