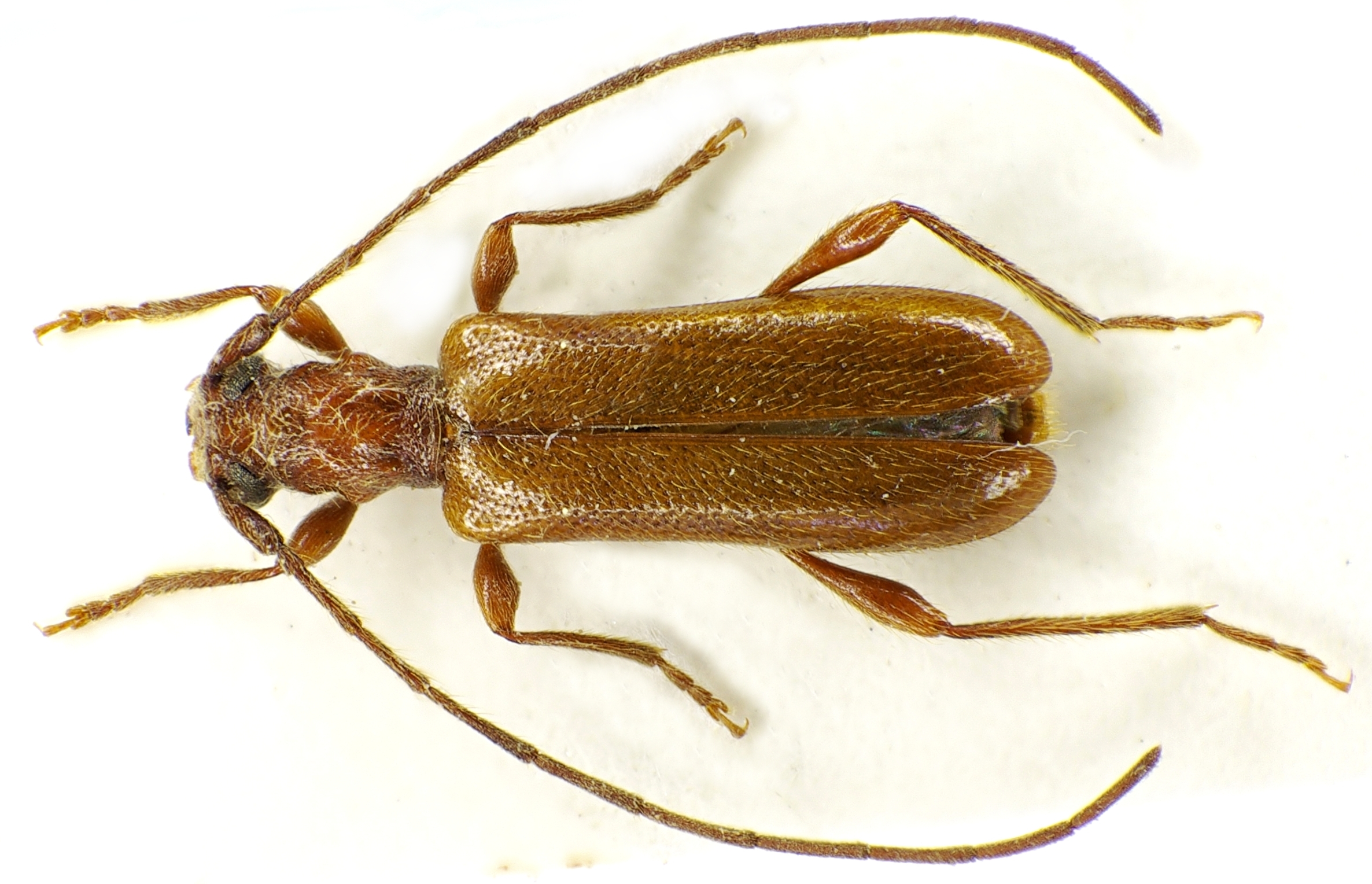
- Obrium brunneum

Scientific classification
- Kingdom: Animalia
- Phylum: Arthropoda
- Class: Insecta
- Order: Coleoptera
- Suborder: Polyphaga
- Infraorder: Cucujiformia
- Family: Cerambycidae
- Tribe: Obriini
- Genus: Obrium; Dejean, 1821

= Obrium =

Genus of beetles

Obrium is a genus of longhorn beetles in the tribe Obriini, erected by Dejean in 1821.

== Species ==
The following are included in BioLib.cz:

1. Obrium aegrotum Holzschuh, 1982
2. Obrium akikoae Niisato, 1998
3. Obrium albifasciatum Bates, 1872
4. Obrium angulosum Bates, 1885
5. Obrium angustum Lazarev, 2020
6. Obrium arciferum Bates, 1885
7. Obrium asperatum Joly, 2010
8. Obrium balteatum Hovore & Chemsak, 1980
9. Obrium bartolozzii Adlbauer, 2002
10. Obrium batesi Hovore & Chemsak, 1980
11. Obrium beckeri Knull, 1962
12. Obrium bifasciatum Martins & Galileo, 2004
13. Obrium brevicorne Plavilstshikov, 1940
14. Obrium brunneum (Fabricius, 1793)
15. Obrium californicum Van Dyke, 1920
16. Obrium cantharinum (Linnaeus, 1767)
17. Obrium castaneomarginatum Hayashi, 1977
18. Obrium cephalotes Pic, 1923
19. Obrium cicatricosum Gounelle, 1909
20. Obrium circumcinctum Aurivillius, 1910
21. Obrium circunflexum Martins & Galileo, 2003
22. Obrium clavijoi Joly, 2010
23. Obrium clerulum Bates, 1885
24. Obrium complanatum Gressitt, 1942
25. Obrium constricticolle Schaeffer, 1908
26. Obrium consulare Holzschuh, 2008
27. Obrium coomani Pic, 1927
28. Obrium cordicolle Bates, 1870
29. Obrium costaricum Hovore & Chemsak, 1980
30. Obrium cribripenne Bates, 1885
31. Obrium cruciferum Bates, 1885
32. †Obrium damgaardi Vitali, 2015
33. Obrium dimidiatum Hovore & Chemsak, 1980
34. Obrium discoideum (LeConte, 1873)
35. Obrium dominicum Linsley, 1957
36. Obrium elongatum Niisato, 1998
37. Obrium facetum Holzschuh, 1989
38. Obrium filicorne Holzschuh, 2008
39. Obrium formosanum Schwarzer, 1925
40. Obrium fractum Holzschuh, 2003
41. Obrium fumigatum Holzschuh, 1995
42. Obrium fuscoapicale Hayashi, 1974
43. Obrium giesberti Hovore & Chemsak, 1980
44. Obrium glabrum Knull, 1937
45. Obrium hainanum Niisato & Hua, 1998
46. Obrium hattai Ohbayashi & Ohbayashi, 1965
47. Obrium helvolum Holzschuh, 2008
48. Obrium huae Niisato, 1998
49. Obrium invenustum Holzschuh, 2008
50. Obrium kusamai Takakuwa, 1984
51. Obrium latecinctum Joly, 2010
52. Obrium longicolle Jordan, 1894
53. Obrium maculatum (Olivier, 1795)
54. Obrium madidum Holzschuh, 2011
55. Obrium mendosum Holzschuh, 2010
56. Obrium miranda Niisato, 2009
57. Obrium mozinnae Linell, 1897
58. Obrium multifarium Berg, 1889
59. Obrium nakanei Ohbayashi, 1959
60. Obrium obliquum Martins & Galileo, 2003
61. Obrium obscuripenne Pic, 1904
62. Obrium oculatum Niisato & Hua, 1998
63. Obrium pallidisignatum Hayashi, 1977
64. Obrium peculiare Martins & Galileo, 2011
65. Obrium peninsulare Schaeffer, 1908
66. Obrium piperitum Bates, 1885
67. Obrium planicolle Hovore & Chemsak, 1980
68. Obrium posticum Gahan, 1894
69. Obrium prosperum Holzschuh, 2008
70. Obrium purcharti Lazarev & Ambrus, 2026
71. Obrium quadrifasciatum Zajciw, 1965
72. Obrium randiae Gardner, 1926
73. Obrium rubidum LeConte, 1850
74. Obrium rudebecki Tippmann, 1959
75. Obrium ruficolle Bates, 1885
76. Obrium rufograndum Gressitt, 1937
77. Obrium rufulum Gahan, 1908
78. Obrium schwarzeri Hayashi, 1974
79. Obrium semidiffusum Joly, 2010
80. Obrium semiformosanum (Hayashi, 1974)
81. Obrium takahashii Kusama & Takakuwa, 1984
82. Obrium tavakiliani Adlbauer, 2003
83. Obrium trifasciatum Bosq, 1951
84. Obrium unicolor Gardner, 1936
85. Obrium vicinum Gounelle, 1909
86. Obrium xanthum Hovore & Chemsak, 1980
