= Obrium dominicum =

Scientific classification
- Kingdom: Animalia
- Phylum: Arthropoda
- Clade: Pancrustacea
- Class: Insecta
- Order: Coleoptera
- Suborder: Polyphaga
- Infraorder: Cucujiformia
- Family: Cerambycidae
- Genus: Obrium
- Species: O. dominicum

Binomial name
- Obrium dominicum Linsley, 1957

Species of beetle

Obrium dominicum is a species of beetle in the family Cerambycidae. It was described by Linsley in 1957.
