= Obrium angustum =

Scientific classification
- Kingdom: Animalia
- Phylum: Arthropoda
- Clade: Pancrustacea
- Class: Insecta
- Order: Coleoptera
- Suborder: Polyphaga
- Infraorder: Cucujiformia
- Family: Cerambycidae
- Genus: Obrium
- Species: O. angustum

Binomial name
- Obrium angustum Lazarev, 2020

Species of beetle

Obrium angustum is a species of beetle in the family Cerambycidae. It was described by Maxim Lazarev in 2020. It is known from China.

== Name ==
Obrium angustum Lazarev, 2020: 138

Type locality: China, Sichuan province, 70 km NW Chengdu, Qingcheng Hou Shan Mountains, 1400 m.

Holotype: Coll. Lazarev. male, China, Sichuan prov., 70 km NW Chengdu, Qingcheng Hou Shan Mts., 1400 m, 2–4.5.2006, S. Murzin & I. Shokhin leg.

== Etymology ==
The species epithet angustum means narrow in Latin.
