= Aslim Taslam =

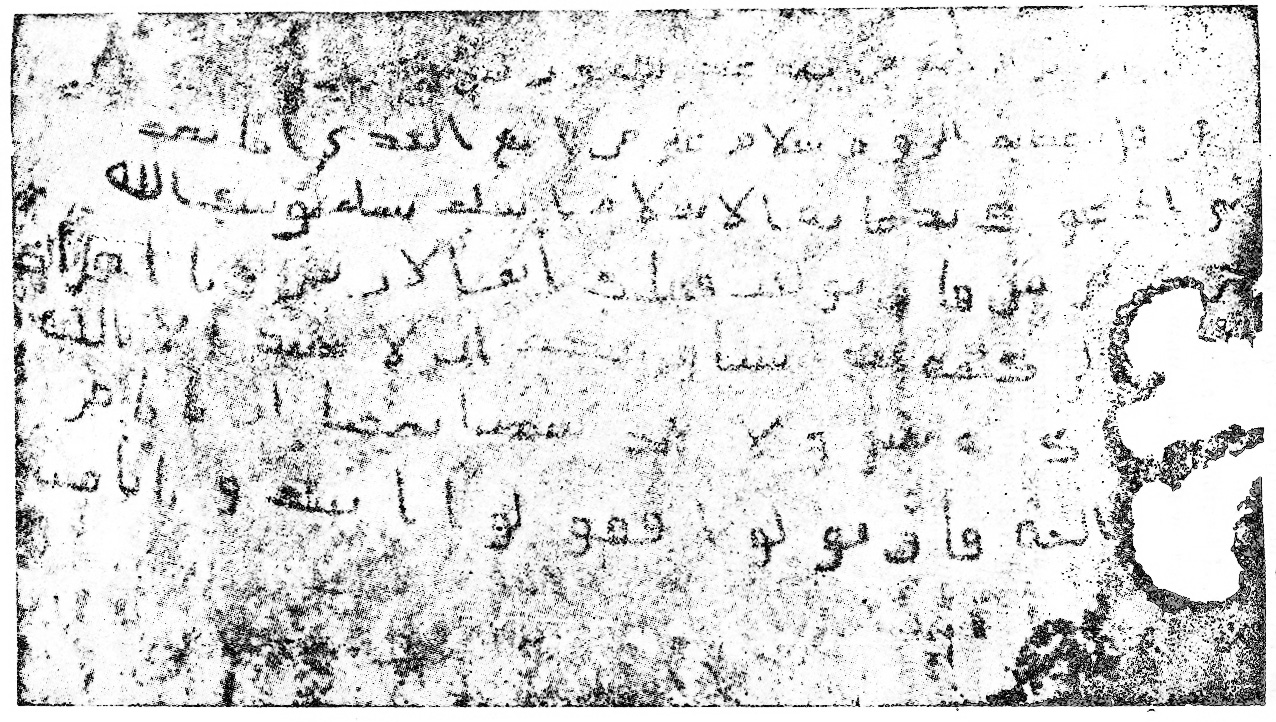
Purported letter sent by Muhammad to the Byzantine emperor Heraclius

Aslim Taslam (Arabic: أسلم تسلم) is a phrase meaning "submit (to God, i.e., by accepting Islam) and you will get salvation", taken from the letters sent by the Islamic prophet Muhammad to various rulers in which he urged them to convert to Islam.

== Letters of Muhammad ==
Muhammad, according to the usually told Islamic historiography, sent ambassadors with such letters to Heraclius the emperor of Eastern Roman Empire, Chosroes II the emperor of Persia, the Negus of Ethiopia, Muqawqis the ruler of Egypt, Harith Gassani the governor of Syria and Munzir ibn Sawa the ruler of Bahrain.

Muhammad's Letter to the King of Oman, Jaifer, and his Brother Abd Al-Jalandi -

In the Name of Allah, the Most Beneficent, the Most Merciful:

From Muhammad bin ‘Abdullah to Jaifer and ‘Abd Al-Jalandi - Peace be upon him who follows true guidance; thereafter I invite both of you to the Call of Islam. Embrace Islam. Allah has sent me as a Prophet to all His creatures in order that I may instill fear of Allah in the hearts of His disobedient creatures so that there may be left no excuse for those who deny Allah. If you two accept Islam, you will remain in command of your country; but if you refuse my Call, then all your possessions are perishable. My horsemen will appropriate your land, and my Prophethood will assume control over your kingship.

The account as transmitted by Muslim historians of the letter to Heraclius reads as follows

=== Western Translation ===
In the name of Allah the Beneficent, the Merciful:

(This letter is) from Muhammad the slave of Allah and His Apostle to Heraclius the ruler of Byzantine. Peace be upon him, who follows the right path. Furthermore I invite you to Islam, and if you become a Muslim you will be safe, and Allah will double your reward, and if you reject this invitation of Islam you will be committing a sin by misguiding your Arisiyin (peasants). (And I recite to you Allah's Statement:)

Say (O Muhammad): 'O people of the scripture! Come to a word common to you and us that we worship none but Allah and that we associate nothing in worship with Him, and that none of us shall take others as Lords beside Allah.' Then, if they turn away, say: 'Bear witness that we are Muslims' (those who have surrendered to Allah)."

—

=== Arabic original ===
بسم الله الرحمن الرحيم من محمد بن عبد الله إلى هرقل عظيم الروم: سلام على من اتبع الهدى، أما بعد فإنى أدعوك بدعوة الإسلام أسلم تسلم يؤتك الله أجرك مرتين، فإن توليت فعليك إثم جميع الأريسيِين قُلْ يَا أَهْلَ الْكِتَابِ تَعَالَوْا إِلَىٰ كَلِمَةٍ سَوَاءٍ بَيْنَنَا وَبَيْنَكُمْ أَلَّا نَعْبُدَ إِلَّا اللَّهَ وَلَا نُشْرِكَ بِهِ شَيْئًا وَلَا يَتَّخِذَ بَعْضُنَا بَعْضًا أَرْبَابًا مِّن دُونِ اللَّهِ ۚ فَإِن تَوَلَّوْا فَقُولُوا اشْهَدُوا بِأَنَّا مُسْلِمُونَ

In the name of God the Beneficent, the Merciful:

(This letter is) from Muhammad son of Abdullah to Heraclius the Great (ruler) of the Romans (Byzantines). Peace be upon him, he who follows the right path. Furthermore I invite thee to Islam; become a Muslim and thou shalt be safe (from Hell or God's punishment), and God will double thy reward (as your people will follow along and be saved because of you), and if thou rejectest, thou shalt bear the sins of the Arisiyins (the peasants, your people).

(And I recite to you God's Statement:) Say (O Muhammad): 'O people of the scripture! Come to a word common to you and us that we worship none but God and that we associate nothing in worship with Him, and that none of us shall take others as Lords beside God. Then, if they turn away, say: 'Bear witness that we are Muslims' (those who have surrendered to God).

— The letter to Chosroes II is similar except that it refers to Magians instead of the Arisiyin.

== Similar Letters of Leaders from Muslim countries ==
On September 17, 2006, in response to the Pope Benedict XVI Islam controversy, characterized by Gazan clerics as "the result of his hatred for Islam and not the result of ignorance." one of them, Sheikh Imad Hamato, called on the pope to "repent and ask for forgiveness" and said: "We want to use the words of the Prophet Muhammad and tell the pope: aslim taslam."

In May 2006, Mahmoud Ahmadinejad, President of the Islamic Republic of Iran, sent a similar letter to former US President George W. Bush saying aslim taslam.

Osama bin Laden sent a handful of such letters both to USA and Europe saying aslim taslam

Adam Gadahn, an American-born Muslim convert from Al Qaeda, sent a video to the American people and said aslim taslam.

Egyptian Cleric Hassan Abu Al-Ashbal issued a similar statement aslim taslam to President Barack Obama.

Hizb ut-Tahrir Indonesia spokesperson, Ismail Yusanto said to Nikolas van Dam, the Dutch ambassador for Indonesia that the Dutch government is responsible for the Fitna (film) of Geert Wilders and said aslim taslam.

== Critical responses ==
In response to the aslim taslam invitation to submit to God by Islam, the Italian author and journalist Oriana Fallaci said "lan astaslem" (Arabic: لن أستسلم) meaning "I will never surrender/I will never submit/I will never be a Muslim". Michelle Malkin has taken up this slogan as a response to the WTC terrorist attacks

== See also ==
- Dawah
- WikiBook: Learn Arabic
- Dictionary of Modern Written Arabic
- Glossary of Islamic terms in Arabic
