= Obrium costaricum =

Scientific classification
- Kingdom: Animalia
- Phylum: Arthropoda
- Clade: Pancrustacea
- Class: Insecta
- Order: Coleoptera
- Suborder: Polyphaga
- Infraorder: Cucujiformia
- Family: Cerambycidae
- Genus: Obrium
- Species: O. costaricum

Binomial name
- Obrium costaricum Hovore & Chemsak, 1980

Species of beetle

Obrium costaricum is a species of beetle in the family Cerambycidae. It was described by Hovore and Chemsak in 1980.
