= Amanah =

Amanah or Al-Amanah may refer to:

== Organizations ==
- Al Amanah College, an Islamic private school in New South Wales, Australia
- Al-Amanah Islamic Bank, a bank in the Philippines
- Amanah Raya Berhad, a Malaysian trustee company wholly owned by the Government of Malaysia
- Amanah Ikhtiar Malaysia, a Malaysian microcredit organisation
- Amanah Saham Bumiputera, a Malaysia unit trust management company
- Angkatan Amanah Merdeka (Amanah), a Malaysian Non-Government Organisation
- National Trust Party (Malaysia) or AMANAH, a political party in Malaysia

== Other uses ==
- Amanah (administrative division), an Arabic term for mayoralty or municipality
