= Masbuq =

Masbuq or Masbuk (Arabic: مَسْبُوق) is derived from the word سبق which means 'came ahead of somebody or something'. In Islamic terminology, a Masbuq is a person in Salah, whose Imam has preceded him a few rakahs or the whole prayer, or he is a person who has joined the Imam after one or more rakahs. mashuq is a person who came late to prayer.

== Rules to Follow ==
Masbuq has to follow the following rules:

1. He should not make Salam with his Imam; rather as soon as Imam completes his first Salam he should stand up to complete his prayer.
2. By completing his own prayer, a "Masbuq" shall perform all the acts of prayers in the same manner, as he has to perform while praying individually.
3. For recitation of surah he shall follow his own rakah count i.e. if he missed two rakah with the Imam and has stood up to complete these remaining rakah, he will have to recite surah in both of them because these rakah will be deemed to be his first and second rakah and his performance with the Imam will be deemed to be third and fourth. Likewise, if he has missed three rakah and performed only one rakah with the Imam, then while performing the remaining three rakah, he will recite a surah in the first two rakah only and will not recite it in the third.
4. However, in the matter of Qa'dah (sitting for Tashahhud), he will follow the total rakah count he has actually performed whether with the Imam or on his own. Therefore, if he has missed three rakah and has performed only one rakah with the Imam, then he will have to sit for Qa'dah right in the first rakah while completing his own prayer, because this is actually his second rakah as combined with the one performed with the Imam, and since Qa'dah is obligatory after every two rakah he has to make Qa'dah right there and he will not sit in the next rakah because it is actually his third rakah.
