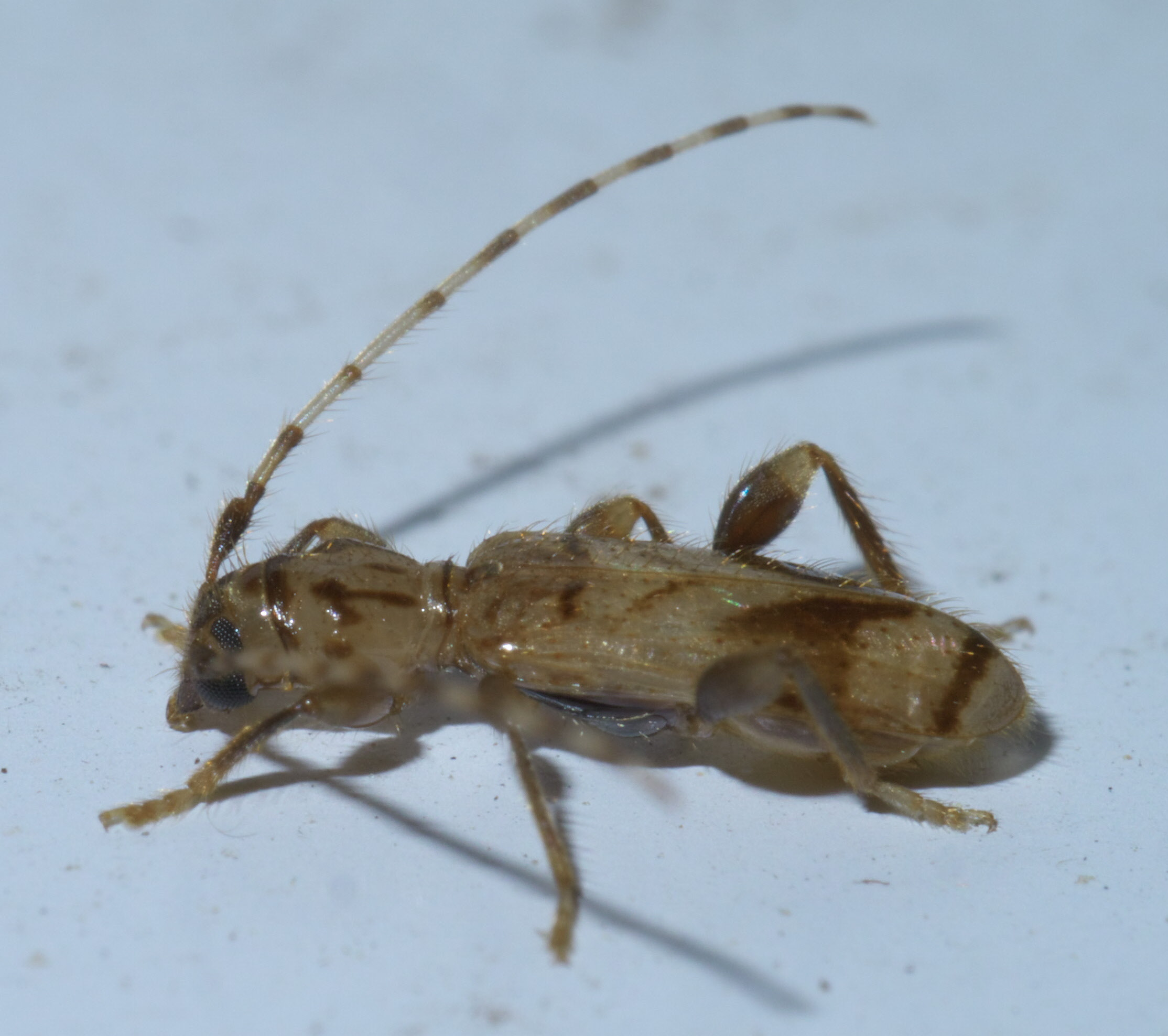

Scientific classification
- Kingdom: Animalia
- Phylum: Arthropoda
- Clade: Pancrustacea
- Class: Insecta
- Order: Coleoptera
- Suborder: Polyphaga
- Infraorder: Cucujiformia
- Family: Cerambycidae
- Genus: Obrium
- Species: O. maculatum

Binomial name
- Obrium maculatum (Olivier, 1795)

= Obrium maculatum =

Species of beetle

Obrium maculatum is a species of beetle in the family Cerambycidae. It was described by Guillaume-Antoine Olivier in 1795.
