= Obrium prosperum =

Scientific classification
- Kingdom: Animalia
- Phylum: Arthropoda
- Clade: Pancrustacea
- Class: Insecta
- Order: Coleoptera
- Suborder: Polyphaga
- Infraorder: Cucujiformia
- Family: Cerambycidae
- Genus: Obrium
- Species: O. prosperum

Binomial name
- Obrium prosperum (Holzschuh, 2008)

Species of beetle

Obrium prosperum is a species of beetle in the Cerambycidae (longhorn beetles) family. The scientific name of this species was first published in 2008 by Holzschuh.
