= Lan astaslem =

Arabic phrase

Lan astaslem (Arabic: لن استسلم ) is an Arabic phrase meaning "I will not surrender". The term is used by Christians in reference to Aslim Taslam (Arabic: أسلم تسلم) ("submit to Islam").

== As resistance statement ==
Oriana Fallaci, the Italian author and outspoken journalist, popularized the rejoinder lan astaslem.

Michelle Malkin has taken up this slogan as a response to the WTC terrorist attacks. T-shirts with lan astaslem have been produced, with all proceeds going to the Families of Freedom Scholarship Fund.

== Submission ==
On September 17, 2006, in response to the Pope Benedict XVI Islam controversy, Imad Hamto, a Palestinian religious leader, said: "We want to use the words of the Prophet Muhammad and tell the pope: ‘Aslim Taslam'. This was interpreted as a threat.
