= Obrium purcharti =

Scientific classification
- Kingdom: Animalia
- Phylum: Arthropoda
- Clade: Pancrustacea
- Class: Insecta
- Order: Coleoptera
- Suborder: Polyphaga
- Infraorder: Cucujiformia
- Family: Cerambycidae
- Genus: Obrium
- Species: O. purcharti

Binomial name
- Obrium purcharti Lazarev & Ambrus, 2026

Species of beetle

Obrium purcharti is a species of beetle in the family Cerambycidae. It was described by Maxim Lazarev and Richard Ambrus in 2026. It is known from Mongolia.

== Name ==
Obrium purcharti Lazarev & Ambrus, 2026: 123

Type locality: Mongolia [M 25], 22 km N of Buglan, 46°17′27.496″N 091°34′39.778″E, 1600 m.

Holotype: Coll. Lazarev. male, Mongolia [M 25], 22 km N of Buglan, 46°17′27.496″N 091°34′39.778″E, 1600 m, 23-25.6.2025, L. Purchart leg.

Etymology: The taxon is named after Luboš Purchart (Department of Forest Ecology, Mendel University in Brno, Czech Republic), a specialist in Tenebrionidae.
