= Obrium multifarium =

Scientific classification
- Kingdom: Animalia
- Phylum: Arthropoda
- Clade: Pancrustacea
- Class: Insecta
- Order: Coleoptera
- Suborder: Polyphaga
- Infraorder: Cucujiformia
- Family: Cerambycidae
- Genus: Obrium
- Species: O. multifarium

Binomial name
- Obrium multifarium Berg, 1889

Species of beetle

Obrium multifarium is a species of beetle in the family Cerambycidae. It was described by Carlos Berg in 1889.
