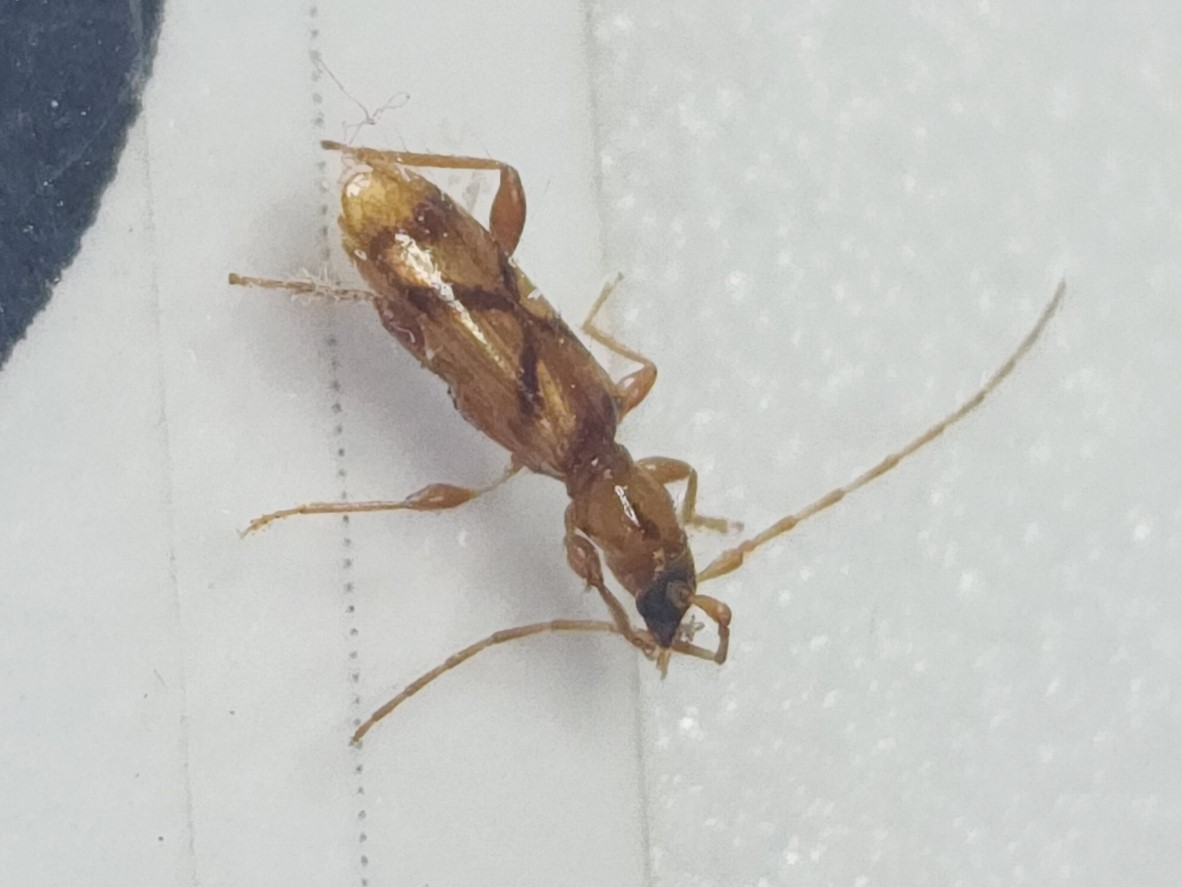

Scientific classification
- Kingdom: Animalia
- Phylum: Arthropoda
- Clade: Pancrustacea
- Class: Insecta
- Order: Coleoptera
- Suborder: Polyphaga
- Infraorder: Cucujiformia
- Family: Cerambycidae
- Genus: Obrium
- Species: O. vicinum

Binomial name
- Obrium vicinum Gounelle, 1909

= Obrium vicinum =

Species of beetle

Obrium vicinum is a species of beetle in the family Cerambycidae. It was described by Gounelle in 1909.
