= Obrium bifasciatum =

Scientific classification
- Kingdom: Animalia
- Phylum: Arthropoda
- Clade: Pancrustacea
- Class: Insecta
- Order: Coleoptera
- Suborder: Polyphaga
- Infraorder: Cucujiformia
- Family: Cerambycidae
- Genus: Obrium
- Species: O. bifasciatum

Binomial name
- Obrium bifasciatum Martins & Galileo, 2004

Species of beetle

Obrium bifasciatum is a species of beetle in the family Cerambycidae. It was described by Martins and Galileo in 2004.
