= Laghw =

In Islam, Laghw (Arabic: لغو) refers to all forbidden forms of speech; it includes nonsense, lies, and talk that is ugly, useless, or indecorous. Laghw is believed to obstruct good and invite evil, and to be excluded from paradise.

According to the Al-Furqan Sura (chapter) of the Qur'an, Muslims are to avoid such things; "... if they pass by some evil play or evil talk, they pass by it with dignity".

Avoiding Laghw is an important attribute for success as a Muslim as described in Sura Mu’minun (The Believers) of the Qur'an 23: 1–9.

Successful indeed are the believers. Who offer Salat with all solemnity and full submissiveness.
Those who turn away from Al-Laghw (dirty, false, evil & forbidden speech).
Those who pay Zakat.
Those who guard their chastity. Except from their wives or that their right hands possess, - for then, they are free from blame. But whosoever seeks beyond
that, then those are the transgressors.
Those who are faithfully true to their amanat (Duties ordered by Allah, honesty, trust) and to their covenants.
And those who strictly guard their prayers (5 prayers at fixed times)

== Qurʾān references ==
Sura 56 - Al-Waqia (MAKKA) : Verse 25 No Laghw (dirty, false, evil vain talk) will they hear therein, nor any sinful speech (like backbiting). Translation : Eng-Dr. Mohsin

Sura 49 - Al-Hujraat (MADINA) : Verse 12 O you who believe! Avoid much suspicion, indeed some suspicions are sins. And spy not, neither backbite one another. Would one of you like to eat the flesh of his dead brother? You would hate it (so hate backbiting)[] . And fear Allâh. Verily, Allâh is the One Who forgives and accepts repentance, Most Merciful. Translation : Eng-Dr. Mohsin

Sura 49 - Al-Hujraat (MADINA) : Verse 12 O ye who believe! Shun much suspicion; for lo! some suspicion is a crime. And spy not, neither backbite one another. Would one of you love to eat the flesh of his dead brother? Ye abhor that (so abhor the other)! And keep your duty (to Allah). Lo! Allah is Relenting, Merciful. Translation : Eng-Pickthal-Audio
