= Tewafuq =

Islamic term

In Islam, the term Tewafuq refers to a God-conscious understanding of a phenomenon fundamental to all events and things. The dictionary definition of the word is "to be correlated to each other in some way" or "to be in a pleasant coherence, correspondence, and conformity with each other". An approximate English translation would be the expression "this was meant to be", referring to events which feel like a conscious hand was at work behind what was happening.

== Meaning ==
Things or events said to be in "tewafuq" demonstrate an intended, planned, and established order by virtue of their being in a state of correspondence and having a well-proportioned, elegant, and subtle correlation designed to fulfil meaningful and wise goals. All things in tewafuq imply that there is no room for any blind chance in the universe, and that the observed existence of things or events cannot be attributed to haphazard, unconscious causes, self-creation or a virtual reign of nature working according to so-called "natural laws". As nothing may remain outside the sphere of the administration of Allah's knowledge and power, so too, nothing may remain outside His will. Amongst all things, be they incremental or a synergistically unified whole, there is always a trace or sign of intention and will. In other words, nothing happens unless Allah wills it to be so. Therefore, there is said to be no chance in the universe.

In fact, all sciences aim to uncover the inherent procedures and laws of the functioning of the universe. All scientific endeavor accepts a priori that the universe and universal laws cannot be the products of random or spontaneous chance, and attempts to verify the accepted principle that, in every aspect of the universe, rules are sought and knowledge can be established. For Muslims, this indicates the existence of tewafuq in the sense that things are in a state of coherence, conformity, and correlation, under the sovereignty of Allah.
