= Hima (environmental protection) =

Traditional Arabian land-stewardship system

A ḥima (Arabic: حمى ḥima), meaning "inviolate zone" or "private pasture", refers to an area set aside for the conservation of natural capital, typically fields, wildlife and forests—contrast ḥaram, which defines an area protected for more immediate human purposes.

== Background ==
According to the Quran, a Muslim has a specific obligation to practice stewardship over nature, and each species of animals is said to be "its own nation". "Human beings are God's representatives on earth. This means that if they are not charged with maintaining the world, or rending to it, they must at least not destroy it".

The selection of ḥimas was thus a religious rather than community obligation, and was often undertaken by the ulema.

There are five types of ḥima:

1. areas where grazing of domestic animals is prohibited
2. areas where grazing is restricted to certain seasons
3. beekeeping reserves where grazing is restricted during flowering
4. forest areas where cutting of trees is forbidden
5. reserves managed for the welfare of a particular village, town or tribe (see also ḥaram, although that term usually refers more to water protection measures)

There are good examples of ḥima in the Middle East, some adopted by the Islamic prophet, Muhammad.

== In The Hadiths ==
Directly referenced is Sahih Al-Bukhari, Vol. 1, Hadith No. 49, stating: Narrated An-Nu'man bin Bashir: I heard Allah's Messenger (pbuh) saying, "Both legal and illegal things are evident but in between them are doubtful (unclear) things, and most of the people have no knowledge about them. So whoever saves himself from these unclear things, he saves his religion and his honor. And whoever indulges in these unclear things is like a shepherd who grazes (his animals) near the Hima (the private pasture) of someone else, and at any moment he is liable to get in it. (O people!) Beware! Every king has a Hima and the Hima of Allah (SwtA) on earth is His illegal things (ie, His forbidden things). Beware! There is a piece of flesh in the body if it becomes good (ie, reformed), the whole body becomes good, but if it gets spoiled, the whole body gets spoiled and that is the heart."
