= Amanah (administrative division) =

Arabic term for Mayor

Amanah (Arabic: أمانة) is an Arabic term used for mayoralty or municipality.

In some Arabic countries, the Amanah is the municipality of the capital.

== Examples ==
- Amanat Baghdad (أمانة بغداد)
- Greater Amman Municipality (أمانة عمان الكبرى)
- Municipality of the Holy City (أمانة العاصمة المقدسة)
- Sana Municipality (أمانة العاصمة)
