= Logos (Islam) =

Concept in Islamic philosophy

The concept of the logos exists in Islam, where it was definitively articulated primarily in the writings of the classical Sunni mystics and Islamic philosophers, as well as by certain Shi'a thinkers, during the Islamic Golden Age. In Sunni Islam, the concept of the logos has been given many different names by the denomination's metaphysicians, mystics, and philosophers, including wasilah, ʿaql ("Intellect"), al-insān al-kāmil ("Universal Man"), kalimat Allāh ("Word of God"), haqīqa muḥammadiyya ("The Muhammadan Reality"), and nūr muḥammadī ("The Muhammadan Light"). Throughout Islamic history, there have existed several different metaphysical concepts that have been understood to correspond "in many respects" to the Logos Christology of Christianity and to the use of the term logos in late ancient Greek philosophy. The concept has been documented as early as the 8th-9th century.

== Muhammad ==
In the writings of many of the most prominent Sunni Islamic metaphysicians, philosophers, and mystics of the Islamic Golden Age, Muhammad, who is given the title of "Seal of the Prophets" in the Quran, was understood to be "both a manifestation of the Logos and the Logos itself, he was also very kind and had prayed for his people every night, and was always very worried about his people. This classical identification of Muhammad with the logos emerged from particular interpretations of specific Quranic verses, hadith, and through the writings of the early mystics of Islam.

== Cosmological concepts ==
At the same time, the logos concept was also intimately tied in the works of the same authors to other important Islamic cosmological concepts, such as ʿaql ("Intellect"), which "resembled the late Greek doctrine of the logos" and represented an Arabic equivalent to the Neoplatonic νοῦς ("Intellect"). Other important Islamic concepts related to the logos include the lawḥ maḥfūẓ (Preserved Tablet, in Quran 85:22), ḳalam ("Divine Pen"), umm al-kitāb ("Mother of the Book," in Quran 3:7, 13:39, 43:4), and the Muhammad-related ideas of al-insān al-kāmil ("Perfect Man" or "Universal Man"), nūr muḥammadī ("Muhammadan Light"), and al-ḥaqīqa al-muḥammadiyya ("Muhammadan Reality"). The logos was often presented as "created" in Islamic doctrine, and thus was more akin to Philo's understanding of the phrase than Nicene Christianity.

=== ʿAql ===
One of the names given to a concept very much like the Christian Logos by the classical Muslim metaphysicians is ʿaql, which is the "Arabic equivalent to the Greek νοῦς (intellect)." In the writings of the Islamic Neoplatonist philosophers, such as al-Farabi (c. 872 – c. 950 AD) and Avicenna (d. 1037), the idea of the ʿaql was presented in a manner that both resembled "the late Greek doctrine" and, likewise, "corresponded in many respects to the Logos Christology."

The concept of logos in Sufism is used to relate the "Uncreated" (God) to the "Created" (humanity). In Sufism, for the Deist, no contact between man and God can be possible without the logos. The logos is everywhere and always the same, but its personification is "unique" within each region. Jesus and Muhammad are seen as the personifications of the logos, and this is what enables them to speak in such absolute terms.

One of the boldest and most radical attempts to reformulate the Neoplatonic concepts into Sufism arose with the philosopher Ibn Arabi, who traveled widely in Spain and North Africa. His concepts were expressed in two major works The Ringstones of Wisdom (Fusus al-Hikam) and The Meccan Illuminations (Al-Futūḥāt al-Makkiyya). To Ibn Arabi, every prophet corresponds to a reality which he called a logos (Kalimah), as an aspect of the unique divine being. In his view the divine being would have for ever remained hidden, had it not been for the prophets, with logos providing the link between man and divinity.

Ibn Arabi seems to have adopted his version of the logos concept from Neoplatonic and Christian sources, although (writing in Arabic rather than Greek) he used more than twenty different terms when discussing it. For Ibn Arabi, the logos or "Universal Man" was a mediating link between individual human beings and the divine essence.

Other Sufi writers also show the influence of the Neoplatonic logos. In the 15th century Abd al-Karīm al-Jīlī introduced the Doctrine of Logos and the Perfect Man. For al-Jīlī, the "perfect man" (associated with the logos or Muhammad himself) has the power to assume different forms at different times and to appear in different guises.

In Ottoman Sufism, Şeyh Gâlib (d. 1799) articulates Sühan (logos-Kalima) in his Hüsn ü Aşk (Beauty and Love) in parallel to Ibn Arabi's Kalima. In the romance, Sühan appears as an embodiment of Kalima as a reference to the Word of God, the Perfect Man, and the Reality of Muhammad.

== See also ==
- Be, and it is
