= Ghafara =

Forgiveness in Islam

In Islamic context, Ghafara (غفر) (v. past tense) or maghfira (forgiveness) is one of three ways of forgiveness, as written in the Qur'an and one of Allah's characteristics. It is to forgive, to cover up (sins) and to remit (absolution).
