= Rahimahullah =

Phrase uttered by Muslims when mentioning respected figures

Rahimahullah (Arabic: رَحِمَهُ ٱللَّٰهُ, romanized: raḥimahu llāh, lit. 'God have mercy on him') is a phrase often used after mentioning the righteous Islamic persons who lived after the companions of Muhammad. The mention of a late male teacher, scholar, leader, or even a relative who was known for his goodness can be followed by the praying of mercy upon him. The equivalent phrase in referring to a woman is rahimahallah (Arabic: رَحِمَهَا ٱللَّٰهُ, romanized: raḥimahā -llāh).
