= Usul =

Usul may refer to:

== Islam ==
From Arabic: أصول (pl. of "root", "principle"):

- Usul al-fiqh, the principles of Islamic jurisprudence
- Usul al-din, the principles of Islamic religion

=== Books ===
- Usul al-Sama, a Sunny treatise
- Usul al-Ifta wa Adabuhu, a Fiqh guide

== Music ==
- Usul (music), a rhythmic pattern used in Ottoman classical music.

== Characters ==
- Usul, the secret tribal name of Paul Atreides in Frank Herbert's Dune novels
- a species in Neopets
