= Bakka'in =

In Islamic history, the Bakka'in were a group of Muslim men who were saddened because they could not afford to travel with the Islamic prophet Muhammad and his army on his campaign to Tabuk. Also known as the Weepers, the Bakka'in were able to join the journey when Abdur-Rahman donated 200 awqiyyah (40 Dirham) of gold to finance the journey.
