= Longipalpus =

Scientific classification
- Kingdom: Animalia
- Phylum: Arthropoda
- Class: Insecta
- Order: Coleoptera
- Suborder: Polyphaga
- Infraorder: Cucujiformia
- Family: Cerambycidae
- Subfamily: Cerambycinae
- Genus: Longipalpus; Montrouzier, 1861

Genus of beetles

Longipalpus is a genus of beetles belonging to the family Cerambycidae.

The species of this genus are found in Southeastern Asia and Australia.

== Species ==
Species:

- Longipalpus bifasciatus (Gressitt, 1959)
- Longipalpus seminiger (Gressitt, 1959)
- Longipalpus carabiformis (McKeown, 1940)
- Longipalpus constricticollis (Gressitt, 1951)
- Longipalpus (Montrouzier, 1861)
- Longipalpus gynandropsidis (Fairmaire, 1850)
- Longipalpus dilaw (Niisato, 1989)
- Longipalpus visayanus (Niisato, 1989)
- Longipalpus shigarorogi (Kano, 1939)
- Longipalpus cylindricollis (Vives & Sudre, 2015)
