= Minhaj =

Minhaj ("way" or "path" in Arabic) may refer to:

== Given name ==
- Minhaj-i-Siraj (1193–??), 13th-century Persian historian of India
- Minhajul Abedin (cricketer, born 1997) (born 1997), Bangladeshi cricketer
- Minhajul Abedin Afridi (born 1999), Bangladeshi cricketer
- Minhajul Abedin (born 1965), former captain of Bangladesh national cricket team
- Minhajul Arfin Azad (born 1971), Indian Bengali politician
- Minhaz Merchant, Indian journalist

== Surname ==
- Hasan Minhaj (born 1985), Indian-American comedian and actor

== Other ==
- Minhaj-ul-Quran, an international non-governmental organization founded by Dr. Muhammad Tahir-ul-Qadri in 1980
- Minhaj University, a degree-awarding institution in Lahore, Pakistan, founded by Dr. Muhammad Tahir-ul-Qadri in 1986

== See also ==
- Manhaj
- Nicki Minaj (born 1982), US-based rapper
- Minhag
- Minhas
