= Be, and it is =

Phrase that occurs eight times in the Quran

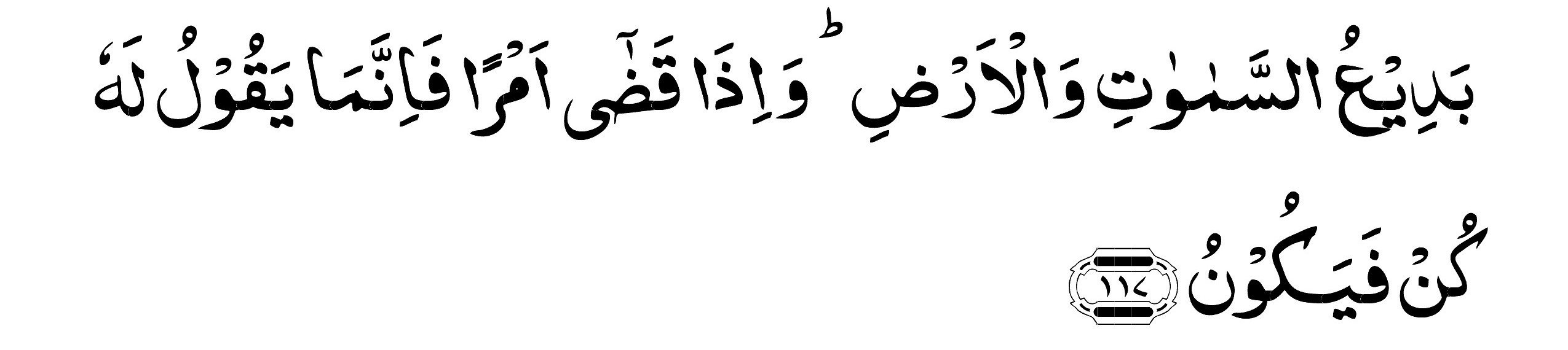
The phrase at the end of the verse 2:117

"Be, and it is" (Arabic: كُن فَيَكُونُ; kun fa-yakūn) is a Quranic phrase referring to the creation by God′s command. In Arabic, the phrase consists of two words; the first word is kun for the imperative verb "be" and is spelled with the letters kāf and nūn. The second word fa-yakun means "it is [done]".

Kun fa-yakūn has its reference in the Quran cited as a symbol or sign of God's supreme creative power. There are eight references to the phrase in the Quran:

== Verse numbers ==
- 2:117 – He is the One Who has originated the heavens and the earth, and when He wills to (originate) a thing, He only says to it: 'Be', and it becomes.
- 3:47 – Mary submitted: 'O my Lord, how shall I have a son when no man has ever touched me?' He said: 'Just as Allah creates what He pleases.' When He decides (to do) some work, He just gives it the command 'Be', and it becomes.
- 3:59 – Surely, the example of ‘Isa (Jesus) in the sight of Allah is the same as that of Adam whom He formed from clay, then said (to him): 'Be'. And he became.
- 6:73 – And He is the One (Allah) Who has created the heavens and the earth (in accordance with His decreed celestial order based) on truth. And the Day when He will say: 'Be', then that (Day of Judgment) will come into being. His Word is the truth. And His will be the sovereignty on the Day when the Trumpet will be blown. He (is the One Who) has the knowledge of the unseen and the seen, and He is All-Wise, All-Aware.
- 16:40 – Our command for a thing is but only this much that when We intend (to bring) it (into existence), We say to it: 'Be', and it becomes.
- 19:35 – It is not Allah's Glory that He should take (to Himself anyone as) a son. Holy and Glorified is He (above this)! When He decrees any matter, He only says to it: 'Be', and it becomes.
- 36:77-83 – Do people not see that We have created them from a sperm-drop, then—behold!—they openly challenge ˹Us˺? And they argue with Us—forgetting they were created—saying, “Who will give life to decayed bones?” Say, ˹O Prophet,˺ “They will be revived by the One Who produced them the first time, for He has ˹perfect˺ knowledge of every created being. ˹He is the One˺ Who gives you fire from green trees, and—behold!—you kindle ˹fire˺ from them. Can the One Who created the heavens and the earth not ˹easily˺ resurrect these ˹deniers˺?” Yes ˹He can˺! For He is the Master Creator, All-Knowing. All it takes, when He wills something ˹to be˺, is simply to say to it: “Be!” And it is! So glory be to the One in Whose Hands is the authority over all things, and to Whom ˹alone˺ you will ˹all˺ be returned.
- 40:68 – He is the One Who gives life and causes death. Then when He decides upon a thing, He says to it only: 'Be', so it becomes.

== In popular culture ==
The phrase Kun fa-yakūn was used in an Urdu poem by the Kashmiri-Punjabi Islamic philosopher-poet Muhammad Iqbal in his book Bal-e-Jibril.

The soundtrack of the Indian Hindi film Rockstar (2011) has a qawwali ghazal by the title "Kun Faya Kun", composed by A. R. Rahman and picturised at the mausoleum of the 13th-century Sufi saint, Nizamuddin Auliya, in Delhi.

== See also ==
- I Am that I Am
- Logos (Islam)
- Soham (Sanskrit)
