= Tarkib =

Arabic grammar

Tarkib (تَرْكِيب) is the Arabic word for construction (primarily syntactic, but also mechanic), assembly. In Islamic context, it refers to the study of Arabic grammar issued from the Qur'an.

The method of Tarkib includes identifying the types of Nouns, Verbs and Haroof
