= Iqama =

Second Islamic call to prayer

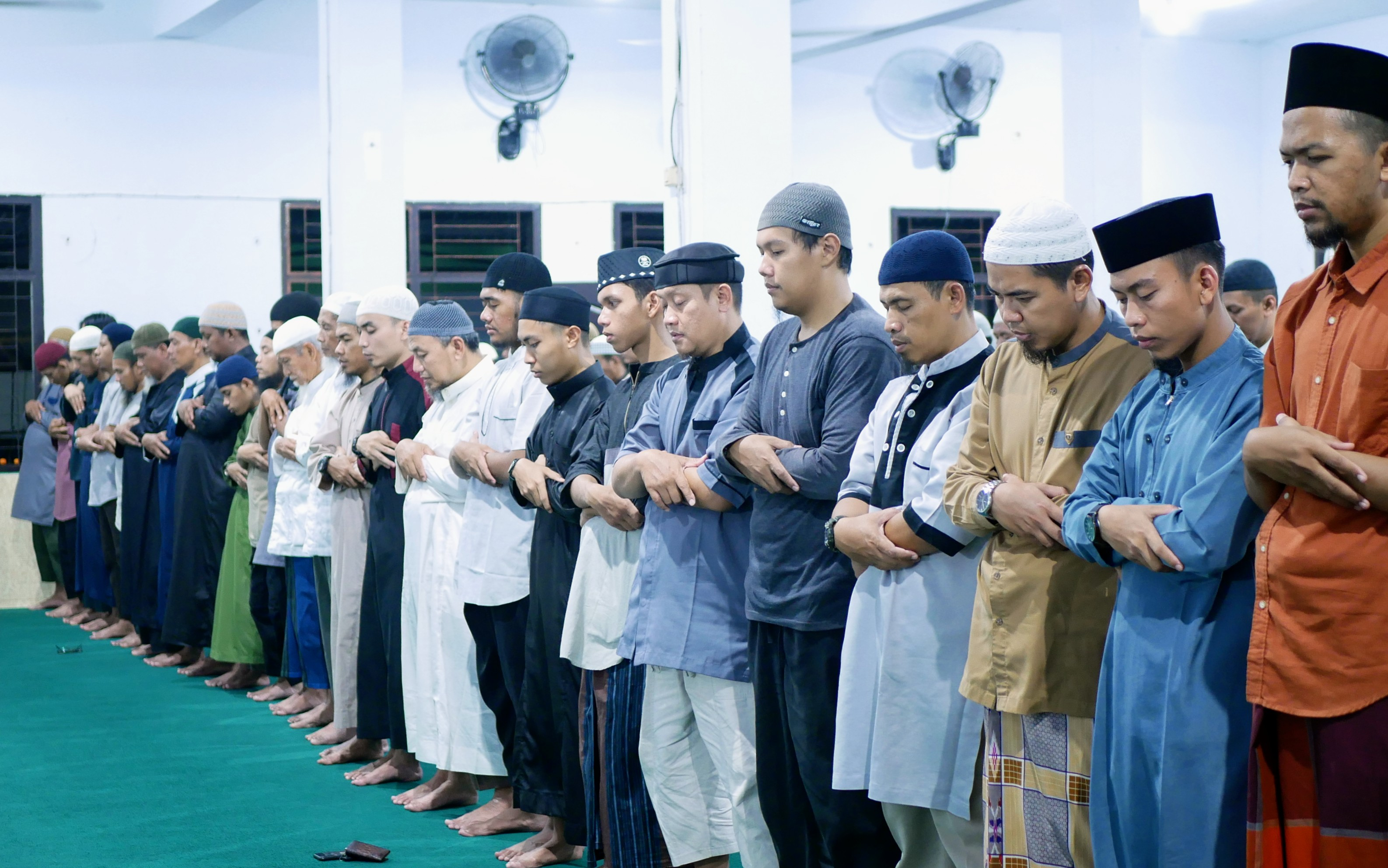
- Muslims preparing for the Taraweeh prayer
- Arabic: إِقَامَة
- Romanization: iqāma
- Literal meaning: "initiation"

The iqama (Arabic: إِقَامَة, romanized: iqāma) is the second Islamic call to prayer, recited after the adhan. It summons those already in the mosque to line up for prayer (salah).

It is traditionally given a more rapid and less sonorous rendering than the adhan, as it is intended merely to draw the attention of those already in the mosque, rather than to remind those outside to come in. Most phrases of the iqama and adhan are the same, though there are variations among the schools (madhahib) of jurisprudence (fiqh) in the preferred number of repetitions of the phrases.

== Text ==
Details of what is recited and how many times
Recital						Arabic Quranic Arabic	Romanization	Translation
Sunni				Ibadi	Shia	Arabic Quranic Arabic	Romanization	Translation
Hanafi	Maliki	Shafi'i	Hanbali	Ibadi	Imami	Arabic Quranic Arabic	Romanization	Translation
4x	2x			4x	2x	ٱللَّٰهُ أَكْبَرُ	allāhu akbar^{u}	God is greatest
2x	1x			2x		أَشْهَدُ أَنْ لَا إِلَٰهَ إِلَّا ٱللَّٰهُ	ashhadu an lā ilāha illa llāh^{u}	I testify there is nothing worthy of worship except God
2x	1x			2x		أَشْهَدُ أَنَّ مُحَمَّدًا رَسُولُ ٱللَّٰهِ	ashhadu anna muḥammadan rasūlu llāh^{i}	I testify Muhammad is the messenger of God
None					2x (recommended) (Note: According to Usuli Twelver Shia scholars, this phrase is not an obligatory part of the adhan nor iqama, but is recommended. Akhbari Twelver Shia scholars, however, consider it an obligatory part of them both. Fatimid, Isma'ili, Alavi Bohras, and Dawoodi Bohra recite this phrase twice at the same place in the adhan, but not iqama. They also recite muḥammadun wa-ʿaliyyun khayru l-basar wa-itaratu huma khayru l-itar (Muhammad and Ali are the best of mankind, and their progeny is the best of progenies) twice after ḥayya ʿalā khayri l-ʿamal. This tradition is continued from their first Da'i al-Mutlaq Zoeb bin Moosa (d. 1132 CE) after their 21st imam al-Tayyib Abi l-Qasim, and they claim this is the true Fatimid tradition.)	أَشْهَدُ أَنَّ عَلِيًّا وَلِيُّ ٱللَّٰهِ	ashhadu anna ʿaliyyan waliyyu llāh^{i}	I testify Ali is the vicegerent of God
2x	1x			2x		حَيَّ عَلَىٰ ٱلصَّلَاةِ حَيَّ عَلَىٰ ٱلصَّلَوٰةِ	ḥayya ʿala ṣ-ṣalāh^{ti}	Come to prayer
2x	1x			2x		حَيَّ عَلَىٰ ٱلْفَلَاحِ حَيَّ عَلَىٰ ٱلْفَلَٰحِ	ḥayya ʿala l-falāḥ^{i}	Come to success
None				2x		حَيَّ عَلَىٰ خَيْرِ ٱلْعَمَلِ	ḥayya ʿalā khayri l-ʿamal^{i}	Come to the best of deeds
2x	1x	2x				قَدْ قَامَتِ ٱلصَّلَاةُ قَدْ قَامَتِ ٱلصَّلَوٰةُ	qad qāmati ṣ-ṣalāh^{tu}	The prayer has been established
2x						ٱللَّٰهُ أَكْبَرُ	allāhu akbar^{u}	God is greater
1x						لَا إِلَٰهَ إِلَّا ٱللَّٰهُ	lā ilāha illa llāh^{u}	There is nothing worthy of worship except God

The one unique line in the iqama, but not adhan, is qad qāmati ṣ-ṣalāh^{tu}, the announcement "the prayer has been established", i.e., is about to commence. It is stated just before the opening allāhu akbar^{u}, the formal start of prayer.

The Hanafi and Shia schools both use the same number of repetitions in both the adhan and iqama, contrary to all the other schools.

Unlike the other schools, the Maliki school recommends qad qāmati ṣ-ṣalāh^{tu} to be said only once. This is based on the practice of the people of Medina during Malik ibn Anas's time.

== Other uses of the term iqama ==
Iqāma is the maṣdar form of the fourth (causative) stem (stem 'af`ala) from the triliteral root Q-W-M, which relates to setting things up, carrying things out, existence, and assorted other meanings. The word iqāma itself is multivalent, but its most common meaning outside the inauguration of prayer is in the context of immigration law, referring to a long-term visa for a foreign national. In some cases, as in Egypt, it is a stamp on the foreigner's passport; in others (as in Morocco and Saudi Arabia) it is a separate identity document in the form of a plastic card.

== See also ==
- Adhan
- Shahada
- Tashahhud
- Salawat
- Islamic honorifics
- Dhikr
- Tawhid
- Barechu - the Jewish call to prayer
- Church bells
