= Shahada =

Islamic statement of faith

The Shahada (Note: Arabic: الشَّهَادَةُ aš-šahādatu; Arabic pronunciation: [aʃ.ʃahaːdatu], 'the testimony'), aš-šahādatāni (الشَّهَادَتَانِ, "the two testimonials"); also kalimatu š-šahādati (كَلِمَةُ ٱلشَّهَادَةِ, "the testimonial word"), also transliterated as Shahadah) is an Islamic oath and creed, and one of the Five Pillars of Islam and part of the adhan. It reads: "I bear witness that there is no god but God, and I bear witness that Muhammad is the Messenger of God." The Shahada declares belief in the oneness (tawhid) of God and the acceptance of Muhammad as God's messenger. Some Shia Muslims also include a statement of belief in the wilayat of Ali, but they do not consider it obligatory for converting to Islam.

A single honest recitation of the Shahada is all that is required for a person to become a Muslim according to most traditional schools.

== Testimonies ==
The declaration reads:

لَا إِلَٰهَ إِلَّا ٱللَّٰهُ
مُحَمَّدٌ رَسُولُ ٱللَّٰهِ

Translation:

There is no god but God
Muhammad is the Messenger of God

The above two statements are commonly prefaced by the phrase ašhadu ʾan (lit. 'I bear witness that'), yielding the full form:

أَشْهَدُ أَلا إِلَه إِلَّا اللَّه، وَأَشْهَدُ أَنْ مُحَمَّدًا رَسُولُ اللَّه

Translation:

I bear witness that there is no god but God, and I bear witness that Muhammad is the Messenger of God

== Translation and significance ==
The Shahada is translated into English as: "There is no god but God. Muhammad is the messenger of God." In English, capitalization of a word's initial letter indicates that it is a proper noun; that is, the name of a unique entity. If it is a noun with a lower case initial letter it is a "common noun"; that is a name which is not unique to an entity, but, instead, could apply to a number of members of a set. The orthography of the translation therefore replicates the original Arabic meaning so that god is a common noun and God is a unique proper name.

The noun shahādah (شَهَادَة), from the verb šahida ([ʃa.hi.da] شَهِدَ), from the root š-h-d (ش-ه-د) meaning "to observe, witness, testify", translates as "testimony" in both the everyday and the legal senses. (Note: The related noun Shahīd ([ʃaˈhiːd] شَهِيد), which is used in the Quran mainly in the sense "witness", has paralleled in its development the Greek martys (μάρτυς) in that it may mean both "witness" and "martyr". Similarly, shahāda may also mean "martyrdom" although in modern Arabic the more commonly used word for "martyrdom" is another derivative of the same root, istišhād (ٱسْتِشْهَاد).) The Islamic creed is also called, in the dual form, shahādatān (شَهَادَتَان, literally "two testimonies"). The expression al-šahīd (ٱلْشَّهِيد, "the Witness") is used in the Quran as one of the "titles of God".

In Sunni Islam, the Shahada has two parts: 'lā ʾilāha ʾillā -llāh' ("There is no deity except God"), and 'muḥammadun rasūlu llāh' ("Muhammad is the Messenger of God"), which are sometimes referred to as the first Shahada and the second Shahada. The first statement of the Shahada is also known as the tahlīl.

In Shia Islam, the Shahada also has an optional third part, a phrase concerning Ali, the first Shia imam and the fourth Rashidun caliph of Sunni Islam: وَعَلِيٌّ وَلِيُّ ٱللَّٰهِ (wa ʿaliyyun waliyyu llāh [wa.ʕa.lijːun wa.lijːu‿ɫ.ɫaː.h]), which translates to "Ali is the wali of God".

In the Quran, the first statement of the Shahada takes the form lā ʾilāha ʾillā llāh twice (37:35, 47:19), and ʾallāhu lā ʾilāha ʾillā huwa (God, there is no deity but Him) much more often. It appears in the shorter form lā ʾilāha ʾillā huwa (There is no deity but Him) in many places. It appears in these forms about 30 times in the Quran. It is never attached with the second part, and any mention of Ali, who is particularly important to Shia Muslims, is absent from the Quran.

Islam's monotheistic nature is reflected in the first sentence of the Shahada, which declares belief in the oneness of God and that he is the only entity truly worthy of worship. The second sentence of the Shahada indicates the means by which God has offered guidance to human beings. The verse reminds Muslims that they accept not only the prophecy of Muhammad but also the long line of prophets who preceded him. While the first part is seen as a cosmic truth, the second is specific to Islam, as it is understood that members of the older Abrahamic religions do not view Muhammad as one of their prophets.

The Shahada is a statement of both ritual and worship. In a well-known hadith, Muhammad defines Islam as witnessing that there is no deity but God and that Muhammad is God's Messenger, giving of alms (zakat), performing the ritual prayer (salah), fasting during the month of Ramadan (sawm), and making a pilgrimage to the Kaaba; the Five Pillars of Islam are inherent in this declaration of faith.

== Recitation ==
Recitation of the Shahada is the most common statement of faith for Muslims. Sunnis, Shia Twelvers, as well as Isma'ilis consider it as one of the Five Pillars of Islam. It is whispered by the father into the ear of a newborn child, and it is whispered into the ear of a dying person. The five canonical daily prayers each include a recitation of the Shahada. Recitation of the Shahada is also the only formal step in conversion to Islam.

This occasion often attracts witnesses and sometimes includes a celebration to welcome the converts into their new faith. In accordance with the central importance played by the notion of intention (Arabic: نِيَّة, niyyah) in Islamic doctrine, the recitation of the Shahada must reflect understanding of its import and heartfelt sincerity. Intention is what differentiates acts of devotion from mundane acts and a simple reading of the Shahada from invoking it as a ritual activity.

== Origin ==
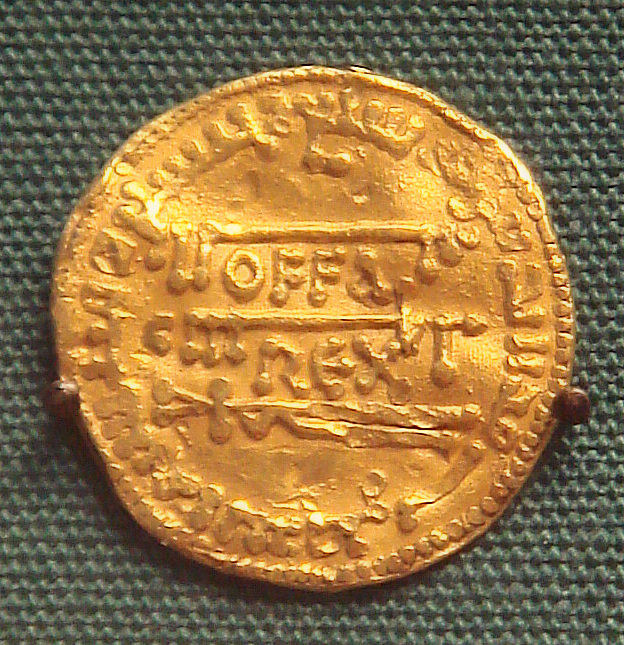
A mancus gold dinar of king Offa of Mercia, copied from the dinars of the Abbasid Caliphate (774); it includes the Arabic text: "Muhammad is the Messenger of God".

Though the two statements of the Shahada are both present in the Quran (for instance, 37:35 and 48:29), they are not found there side by side as in the Shahada formula, but are present in the hadiths. Versions of both phrases began to appear on coins and in monumental architecture in the late seventh century, which suggests that it had not been officially established as a ritual statement of faith until then. An inscription in the Dome of the Rock (est. 692) in Jerusalem reads: "There is no deity but God alone; He has no partner with him; Muhammad is the Messenger of God". Another variant appears on coins minted after the reign of Abd al-Malik ibn Marwan, the fifth Umayyad caliph: "Muhammad is the Servant of God and His messenger".

Material evidence from the 690s documents the existence of differing versions of the Shahada in different regions as opposed to what would standardize into a uniform version in later periods. Although it is not clear when the Shahada first came into common use among Muslims, it is clear that the sentiments it expresses were part of the Quran and Islamic doctrine from the earliest period.

== In sects ==
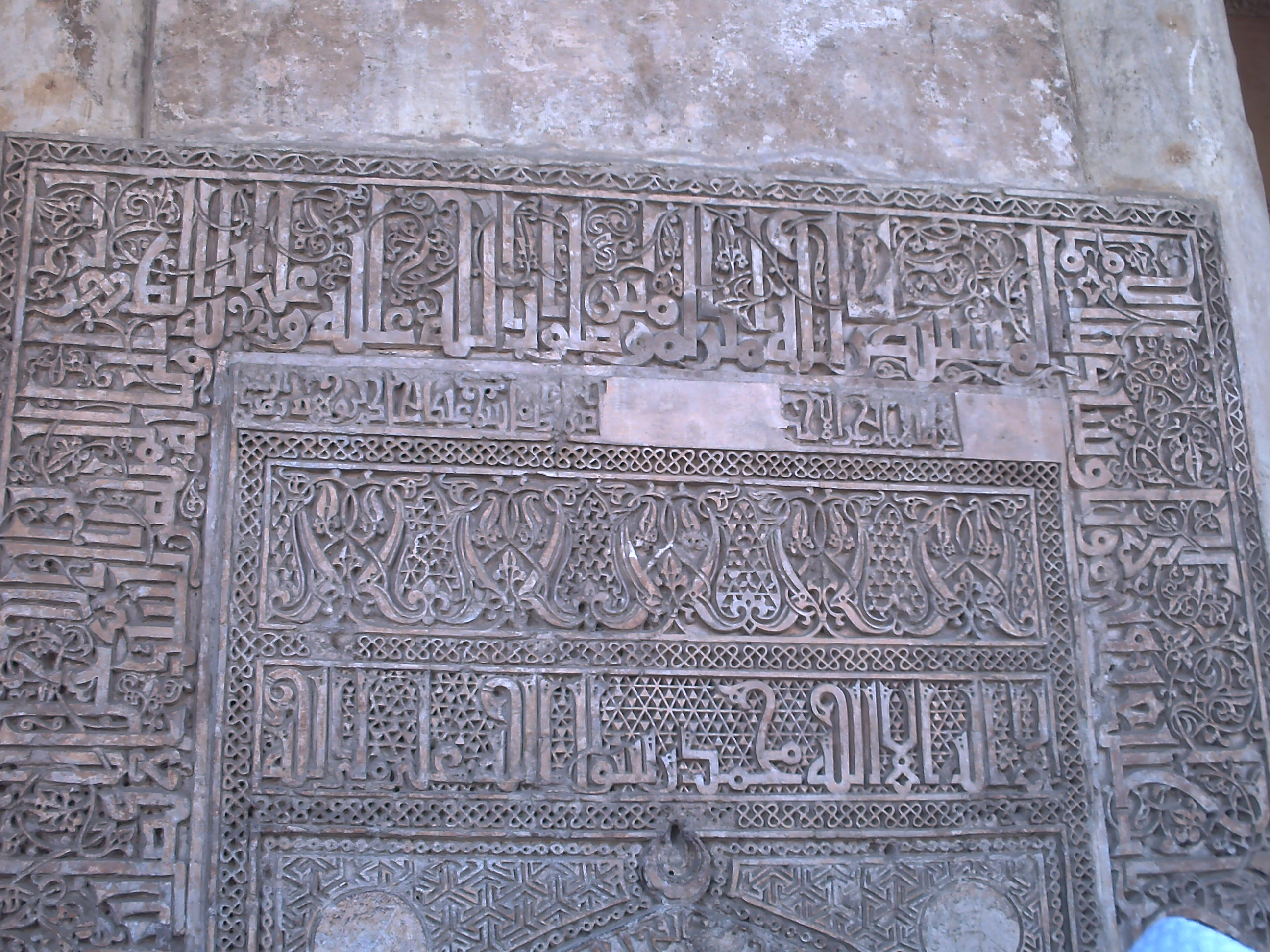
The Qibla of the Fatimid caliph al-Mustansir Billah in the Mosque of Ibn Tulun, Cairo, showing the Shia shahada that ends with the phrase: Aliyyan Waliyyullah ("Ali is the vicegerent of God").

=== Sufism ===
The Shahada has been traditionally recited in the Sufi ceremony of dhikr (Arabic: ذِکْر, "remembrance"), a ritual that resembles mantras found in many other religious traditions. During the ceremony, the Shahada may be repeated thousands of times, sometimes in the shortened form of the first phrase where the word Allah ("God") is replaced by huwa ("Him"). The chanting of the Shahada sometimes provides a rhythmic background for singing.

=== Alawism ===
Due to the fact that the Alawites, an ethnoreligious sect of Islam, believe that Ali ibn Abi Talib, the "first Imam" in the Twelver school, as the physical manifestation of God and due to this, they don't take the shahada as other groups within Islam. Instead, they state the shahada as "there is no God but Ali" in accordance to their belief. Due to this and their belief in Ali as the physical manifestation of God, they weren't thought of as Muslims as it was considered idolatrous, this changed in 1932 when the Grand Mufti of Palestine, Amin al-Husseini: "issued a fatwa seeking to undermine the foundations of French colonialism" in French Syria by offering the Alawites "equal treatment in an independent Syria", according to Fabrice Balanche.

== In architecture and art ==
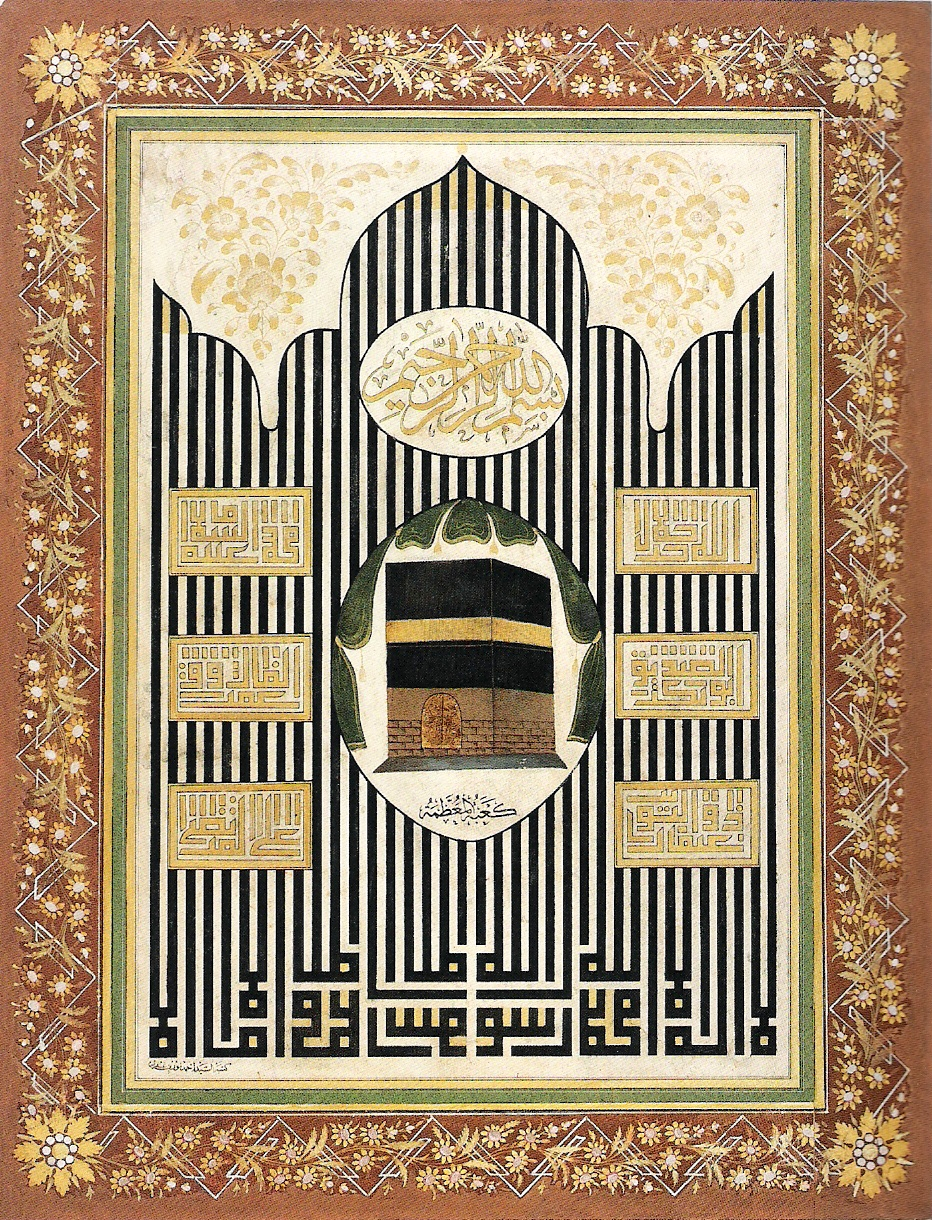
Shahada written in the style of a Mamluk tughra on the bottom right and in mirror image on bottom left.

The Shahada appears as an architectural element in Islamic buildings around the world, such as those in Jerusalem, Cairo, and Istanbul.

Late-medieval and Renaissance European art displays a fascination with Middle Eastern motifs in general and the Arabic script in particular, as indicated by its use, without concern for its content, in painting, architecture and book illustrations.

== Use on flags ==
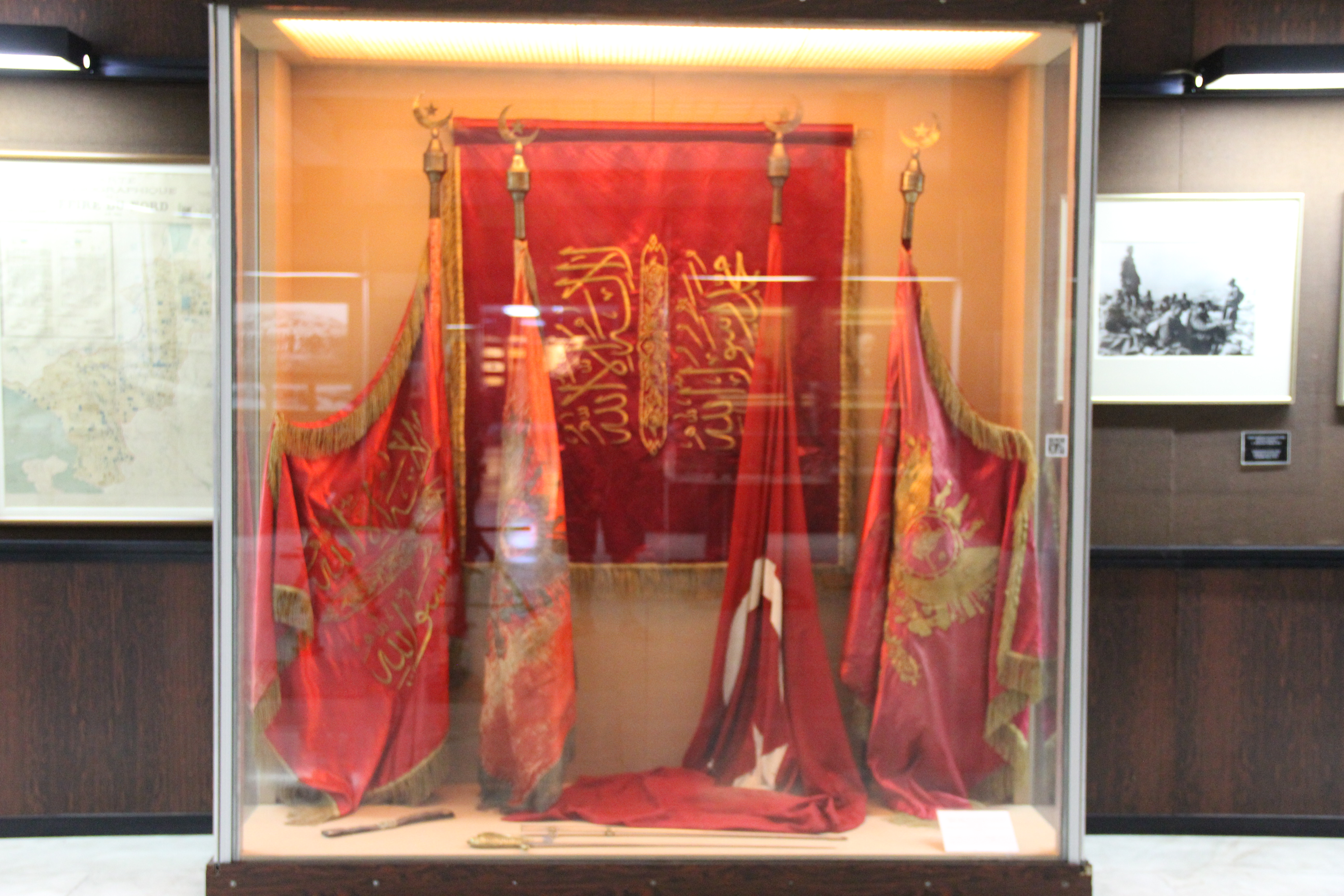
Ottoman Turkish regimental standards with Ottoman Turkish national flag

The Shahada is found on some Islamic flags. For example, Wahhabis have used the Shahada on their flags since the 18th century. The Ottoman army often used verses from the Quran and Shahada on their flags. This tradition continued during the First World War. When Ottoman Turkey joined the war on the side of the Central Powers in 1914, it declared a jihad against the Entente States. The modern Ottoman Turkish army used the Ottoman state coat of arms on one side of their standard regimental flags and Shahada on the other. The Ottoman regimental flags consisted of gold writings and the state emblem on a red background. After the dissolution of the Ottoman Empire in 1922, this practice continued for a while in modern Turkey.

In 1902, Ibn Saud, leader of the House of Saud and the future founder of Saudi Arabia, added a sword to this flag. The modern flag of Saudi Arabia was introduced in 1973. The flag of Somaliland has a horizontal strip of green, white, and red with the Shahada inscribed in white on the green strip.

The flag of Afghanistan under the Taliban is a white flag with the Shahada inscribed in black. The various jihadist black flags used by Islamic insurgents since the 2000s have often followed this example. The Shahada written on a green background has been used by supporters of Hamas since about 2000. The 2004 draft constitution of Afghanistan proposed a flag featuring the Shahada in white script centered on a red background. In 2006, the Islamic State of Iraq designed its flag using the Shahada phrase written in white on black background. The font used is supposedly similar to the font used as seal on the original letters written on Muhammad's behalf.

=== Gallery ===
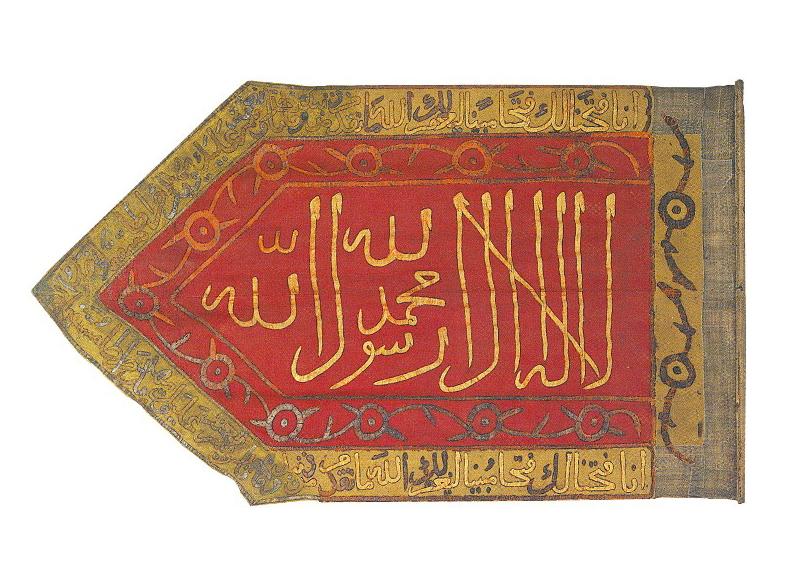
Shahada Flag of Ottoman Army in Battle of Vienna (1683)

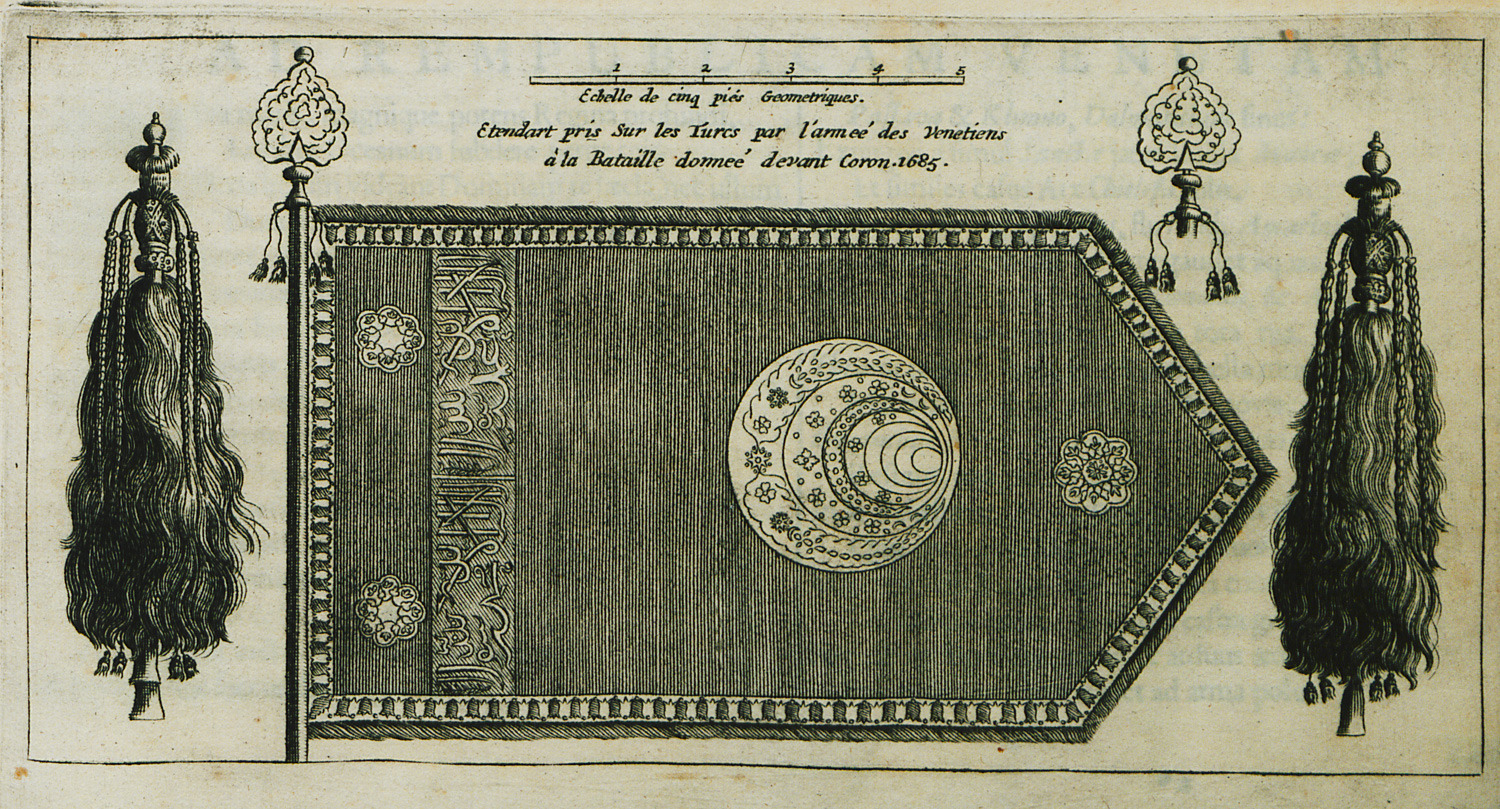
Shahada Flag of Ottoman Army in Morea (1690)

One Side of Ottoman Turkish Regimental Standard with Shahada which used in World War 1 (1914)

Kingdom of Saudi Arabia

Flag of Isaaq Sultanate (1749–1884)

Republic of Somaliland

Kingdom of Yemen (1923–1927)

Islamic State of Afghanistan (1992–2002)

Islamic Republic of Afghanistan (2004–2021)

Islamic Emirate of Afghanistan

== See also ==
- Glossary of Islam
- Outline of Islam
- Index of Islam-related articles
- Flags representing the Shahada
- Islamic honorifics
- Adhan
- Aqidah
- Basmala (Bismillah)
- Dhikr
- Iqama
- Salawat
- Shema Yisrael (Judaism)
- Six Kalmas
- Takbir (Allāhu ʾAkbar)
- Tashahhud
- Wa qul rabbi zidni ilma
