= Sifat Salat al-Nabi =

Sifat Salat al-Nabi min al-Takbir ila al-Taslim ka-Annaka Taraha
- Author: Muhammad Nasir al-Din al-Albani
- Translator: Usama ibn Suhaib Hasan
- Language: Arabic
- Subject: Salah
- Publication date: Mid-Twentieth Century
- English publication date: 1996
- Pages: 192
- ISBN: 9786038028445 2011 Re-publication

Sifat Salat al-Nabi min al-Takbir ila al-Taslim ka-Annaka Taraha (The Prophet's Prayer from the Opening Takbir to the Taslim as Though You Were Watching It; commonly translated as The Prophet's Prayer Described or A Textbook of Description of the Prophet's Prayer) is a book on Islamic ritual prayer (salah) by the Albanian Islamic scholar Al-Albani (1914-1999). First published in the mid-twentieth century, it is among his best-known works. In it, al-Albani examines hadiths concerning the Prophet Muhammad's manner of prayer, arguing that the prescribed form of salah should be derived from the Qur'an and authentic Sunnah rather than adherence to the rulings of any particular Sunni legal school (madhhab).

The book has been republished in numerous Arabic editions and translated into multiple languages. It has been influential within the contemporary Salafi movement and has become one of al-Albani's most widely read works. Its methodology and legal conclusions have also attracted criticism from some scholars of the established Sunni legal schools, who have disputed aspects of al-Albani's hadith criticism and jurisprudential approach.

== Background ==
Al-Albani wrote Sifat Salat al-Nabi as a study of the Prophet Muhammad's manner of performing salah based on hadith literature. In the introduction, he explains that the work was intended to encourage Muslims to emulate the Prophet's prayer by relying on authentic narrations while examining the evidence presented by earlier jurists. He further states that the book was prepared in response to requests from students for a concise guide to the Prophet's prayer supported by hadith evidence.

First published in the mid-twentieth century, the work was revised several times during al-Albani's lifetime. Successive editions incorporated corrections, expanded discussions of hadith authenticity, explanatory notes, and responses to questions and objections raised by readers. The book has since been republished by numerous publishers in the Arab world and elsewhere.

== Contents ==
Sifat Salat al-Nabi describes the Prophet Muhammad's manner of prayer from the opening takbir to the concluding taslim. The book covers the principal components of salah, including the opening supplications, Qur'anic recitation, bowing (ruk'u), prostration (sujud), the tashahhud, and other obligatory, recommended sunnah, and supplementary acts of prayer. It also discusses voluntary prayers and examines practices that al-Albani considered unsupported by authentic hadith.

Throughout the work, al-Albani cites narrations from the major hadith collections, assesses their authenticity, and compares variant reports where they differ. He frequently refers to the opinions of earlier hadith scholars and jurists before explaining the evidentiary basis for his preferred conclusions.

The book reflects al-Albani's broader methodology of deriving legal rulings directly from the Qur'an and authentic Sunnah through hadith criticism. While discussing the views of the classical Sunni legal schools, he argues that legal opinions should be evaluated in light of the strongest available textual evidence.

== Reception ==
Sifat Salat al-Nabi has been widely circulated within the contemporary Salafi movement and is regarded there as one of al-Albani's principal works on ritual prayer. Scholars have identified the book's extensive use of hadith documentation and its attempt to reconstruct the Prophet Muhammad's manner of prayer from narrations considered authentic by al-Albani as characteristic of his broader approach to Islamic jurisprudence.

The work has also been criticised by scholars representing the established Sunni legal schools. Critics have questioned aspects of al-Albani's methodology, including his authentication of narrations and some of his legal conclusions on the manner of prayer. These disagreements reflect broader methodological debates concerning the relationship between hadith criticism and the jurisprudential principles of the classical Sunni legal schools.

== Influence ==
Since its first publication, Sifat Salat al-Nabi has been reprinted by numerous publishers and translated into multiple languages, making it one of al-Albani's most widely circulated works. The book has been widely used within the contemporary Salafi movement as a reference on the Prophet Muhammad's manner of prayer and has been adopted in study circles, educational programs, and religious instruction.

The work has also been cited in discussions of al-Albani's hadith methodology and legal thought, particularly in studies examining the relationship between hadith criticism and Islamic jurisprudence in the modern period.

== Editions and translations ==
Sifat Salat al-Nabi has been published in numerous Arabic editions since its initial release in the mid-twentieth century, with several editions revised by al-Albani during his lifetime. Later printings incorporated corrections, expanded discussions of hadith authenticity, and responses to questions raised by readers and scholars.

The book has been translated into numerous languages, including English, Urdu, Bengali, Turkish, Indonesian, French, and several European and Asian languages. It continues to be reprinted by Islamic publishers worldwide and remains one of al-Albani's most widely distributed works.

=== English translations ===
Year	English title	Translator	Publisher	Notes
1996	The Prophet's Prayer Described: From the Beginning to the End as Though You See It	Usama ibn Suhaib Hasan	Al-Hidaayah Publishing & Distribution (Birmingham, UK)	First complete English translation.
2013	Description of the Prophet's Prayer (Revised edition)	Usama ibn Suhaib Hasan	Al-Hidaayah Publishing & Distribution	Revised and abridged edition by the publisher.
2024	Description of the Prophet's Prayer: A Textbook on the Prayer	-	Dar as-Sunnah Publishers	Abridged English edition based on the original Arabic work.
