= Ziyarat =

Pilgrimage to sites associated with Muhammad and Islam

Ziyarah (Arabic: زِيَارَة ziyārah, "visit"; or ziyarat, Persian: زیارت, ziyārat, "pilgrimage"; Turkish: ziyaret, "visit") is a form of pilgrimage to sites associated with venerated figures in Islam such as the Islamic prophet Muhammad, his family members and descendants (including the Shī'ī Imāms), his companions and other venerated figures such as the prophets, Sufi auliya, and Islamic scholars. Sites of pilgrimage include mosques, maqams, battlefields, mountains, and caves.

Ziyārat can also refer to a form of supplication made by the Shia, in which they send salutations and greetings to Muhammad and his family.

== Terminology ==
Ziyarat comes from Arabic: زَار, romanized: zār "to visit". In Islam it refers to pious visitation, pilgrimage to a holy place, tomb or shrine. Iranian and South Asian Muslims use the word ziyarat for both the Hajj pilgrimage to Mecca as well as for pilgrimages to other sites such as visiting a holy place. In Indonesia the term is ziarah for visiting holy places or graves.

Different Muslim-majority countries, speaking many different languages, use different words for these sites where ziyarat is performed:

- Ziyāratgāh – Persian word meaning, "sites of Ziyarat"
- Imāmzādeh – in Iran, tombs of the descendants of the Twelver Imāms
- Dargah Urdu/Persian: درگاہ; Turkish: Dergâh; Hindi: दरगाह; literally: "threshold, doorstep [of the interred holy person's spiritual sanctum];" the shrine is considered a "doorstep" to a spiritual realm) – in South Asia, Turkey and Central Asia for tombs of Sufi saints
- Ziarat or Jiarat – in Southeast Asia
- Ziyaratkhana – in South Asia (less common)
- Gongbei (Chinese: 拱北) – in China (from Persian gonbad "dome")
- Mazar – a general term meaning a shrine, typically of a Shi'i Saint or noble.
- Maqam – a shrine built on the site associated with a Muslim saint or religious figure.

== Views ==
=== Sunni ===
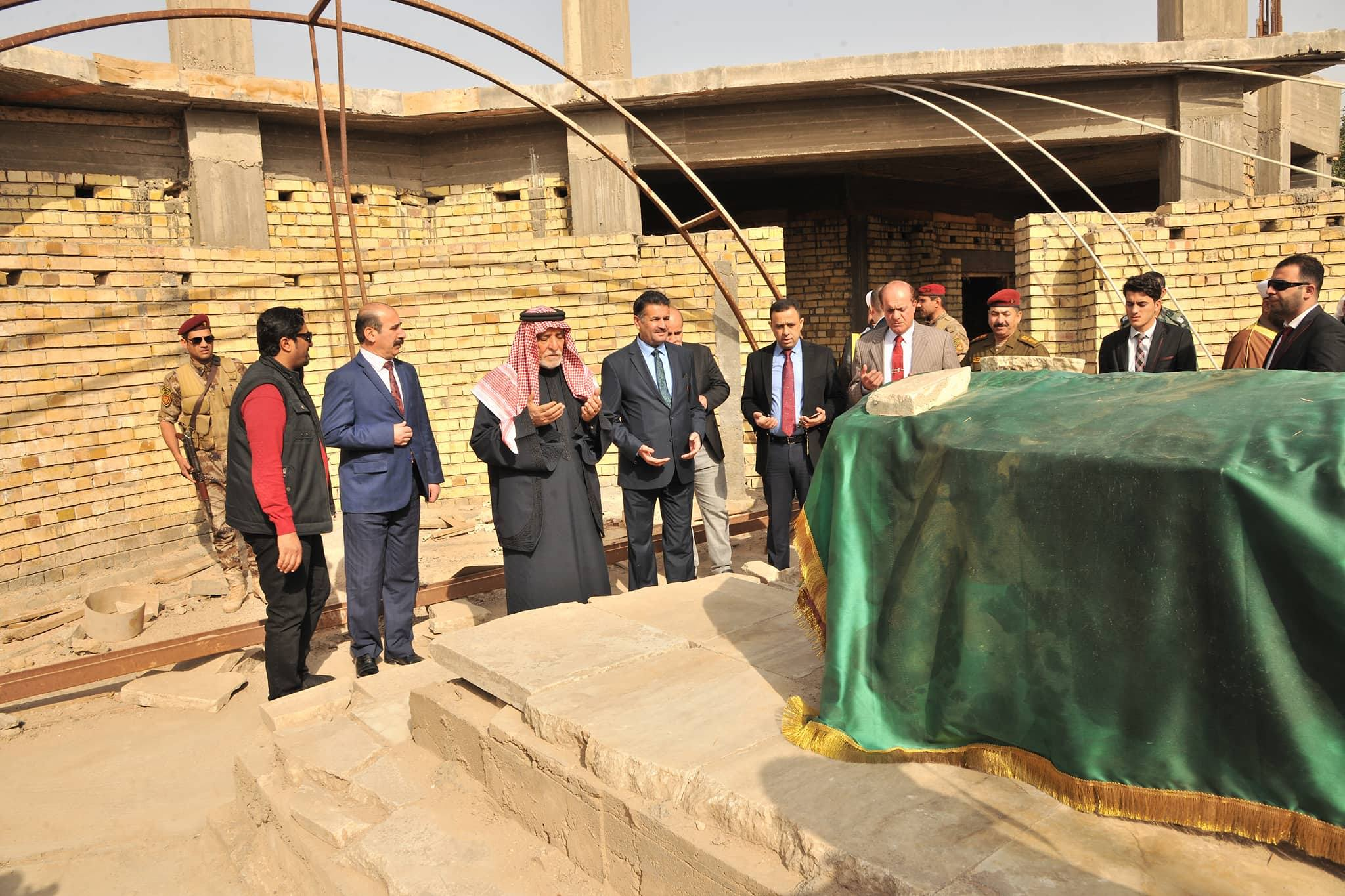
Sunnis praying at the grave of Talhah Bin Ubaydallah in Basra, Iraq.

More than any other tomb in the Islamic world, the shrine of Muhammad is considered a source of blessings for the visitor. A hadith of Muhammad states that, "He who visits my grave will be entitled to my intercession" and in a different version "I will intercede for those who have visited me or my tomb." Visiting Muhammad's tomb after the pilgrimage is recommended according to the majority of Sunni legal scholars.

The early scholars of the Salaf, Ahmad ibn Hanbal (d. 241 AH), Ishaq ibn Rahwayh (d. 238 SH), Abdullah ibn Mubarak (d. 189 AH) and Imam Shafi'i (d. 204 AH) all permitted the practice of Ziyarah to Muhammad's tomb.

According to the Hanbali scholar Al-Hasan ibn 'Ali al-Barbahari (d. 275 AH), it is obligatory to send salutations (salam) upon Abu Bakr al-Siddiq and ‘Umar ibn al-Khattab after sending salutations upon Muhammad when his grave is visited.

The hadith scholar Qadi Ayyad (d. 544 AH) stated that visiting Muhammad was "a sunna of the Muslims on which there was consensus, and a good and desirable deed."

Ibn Hajar al-Asqalani (d. 852 AH) explicitly stated that travelling to visit the tomb of Muhammad was "one of the best of actions and the noblest of pious deeds with which one draws near to God, and its legitimacy is a matter of consensus."

Similarly, Ibn Qudama (d. 620 AH) considered Ziyarat of Muhammad to be recommended and also seeking intercession directly from Muhammad at his grave. Other historic scholars who recommended Ziyarah include Imam al-Ghazali (d. 505 AH), Imam Nawawi (d. 676 AH) and Muhammad al-Munawi (d. 1031 AH). The tombs of other Muslim religious figures are also respected. The son of Ahmad ibn Hanbal named Abdullah, one of the primary jurists of Sunnism, reportedly stated that he would prefer to be buried near the shrine of a saintly person than his own father.

==== Salafi ====
Ibn Taymiyya condemned all forms of seeking intercession from the dead, and said that all the hadiths encouraging visitation to Muhammad's tomb are fabricated (mawdu‘).

This view of Ibn Taymiyya was rejected by many Sunni scholars, both during his life and after his death. The Shafi'i hadith master Ibn Hajar al-Asqalani stated that "This is one of the ugliest positions that has been reported of Ibn Taymiyya". The Hanafi hadith scholar Ali al-Qari stated that, "Amongst the Hanbalis, Ibn Taymiyya has gone to an extreme by prohibiting travelling to visit the Prophet – may God bless him and grant him peace" Qastallani stated that "The Shaykh Taqi al-Din ibn Taymiyya has abominable and odd statements on this issue to the effect that travelling to visit the Prophet is prohibited and is not a pious deed."

=== Shia ===
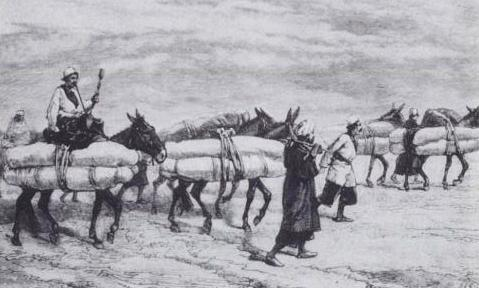
Carrying corpses to the Holy Shrines in Persia, the 19th century.

There are reasons why Shī‘ah partake in Ziyarah which do not involve the worship of the people buried within the tombs. Ayatollah Borujerdi and Ayatollah Khomeini have both said:

It is haram (forbidden) to prostrate to anyone except God. If the act of prostration in front of the shrines of the Infallible Imams ('a.s.) is a form of thanksgiving to God, there is no objection, otherwise, it is haram.

— Ayatollah Borujerdi.

The Shī‘ah do however perform Ziyarah, believing that the entombed figures bear great status in the eyes of God, and seek to have their prayers answered through these people (a form of Tawassul) – Sayyid Muhammad Hasan Musawi writes:

They (the holy figures) are being requested to supplicate to God, to deliver the person in need from his affliction, since the supplication of these saintly figures is accepted by Allah.

— Sayyid Muhammad Hasan Musawi.

In this regard, Ibn Shu’ba al-Harrani also narrates a hadīth from the tenth Imām of the Twelver Shī‘as:

God has some areas in which he likes to be supplicated, and the prayer of the supplicator is accepted (in those areas); the sanctuary of Husayn (a.s.) is one of these.

— Ibn Shu’ba al-Harrani.

The Ziyarah of the Imāms is also done by the Shī‘ah, not only as a means of greeting and saluting their masters who lived long before they were born, but also as a means of seeking nearness to God and more of His blessings (barakah). The Shī‘ah do not consider the hadith collected by al-Bukhari to be authentic, and argue that if things such as Ziyarah and Tawassul were innovations and shirk, Muhammad himself would have prohibited people as a precaution, from visiting graves, or seeking blessings through kissing the sacred Black Stone at the Ka‘bah.

It is a popular Shi'i belief that to be buried near the burial place of the Imams is beneficial. In Shi'i sacred texts it is stated that the time between death and resurrection (barzakh) should be spent near the Imams.[23]

== See also ==
- Hajj and Umrah
- List of ziyarat locations
- Tablet of Visitation
- Ziyarat Jami'ah Kabirah
- List of holiest Shi'ite sites
