= Salawat =

Arabic phrase which contains the salutation upon the Prophet of Islam

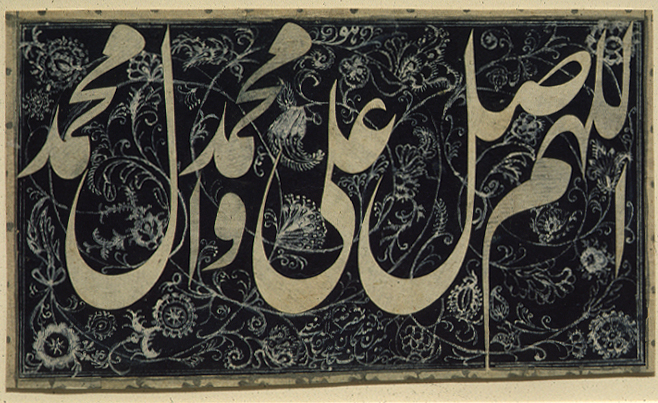
Calligraphic Arabic text of the "Salawat": Arabic: «اللهم صل علی محمد و آل محمد», meaning "Blessings and peace be upon Muhammad and his family", in the handwriting of Shamsuddin Asaf Jahi

Arabic text of another shape of "Salawat": Arabic: «صَلَی اللهُ عَلَیه و سَلَّم», meaning "May God send his mercy and blessings upon him"

Salawat (Arabic: صَلَوَات, romanized: ṣalawāt; sing. صَلَاة, ṣalāh) or durood (Urdu: دُرُوْد, romanized: durōd, darōd, durūd, darūd) is an Islamic complimentary Arabic phrase which contains veneration for Muhammad. This phrase is usually expressed by Muslims as part of their five daily prayers (usually during the tashahhud) and also when Muhammad's name is mentioned. Salawat is a plural form of salat (Arabic: صَلَاة) and from the triliteral root of ṣ-l-w (the letters ṣād-lām-wā, ص ل و) which literally means 'prayer' or 'send blessings upon'. Some Arabic philologists suggest that the meaning of the word "Salawat" varies depending on who uses the word and to whom it is used for.

The suffix «صَلَوَاتُ اَللَّهِ عَلَيْهِ وَ آلِه», meaning "May God's peace be upon him and his household", is a respectful Arabic term used in Islamic texts to respect the prophet of Islam, Muhammad when his name mentioned. In Twelver Shi'ism, this term can be used for the Fourteen Infallibles or any great person. This phrase is most often used after the name Muhammad. This Arabic phrase may also come after the names of special and holy people. All of these phrases mean "asking for divine favor for a special and holy person." On the other hand, in Islamic sources, Salawat may also be seen in other forms, including «صَلَی اللهُ عَلَیه و آلِه و سَلَّم» (translation: May God grant him and his family mercy and peace), «صَلَی اللهُ عَلَیه و سَلَّم» (translation: May God send his mercy and blessings upon him), «صَلَی اللهُ عَلَیه و آلِه» (translation: May God's blessings be upon him and his household), «صَلَی اللهُ عَلَیه» (translation: May God's blessings be upon him), «صَلَوَاتُ اَللَّهِ عَلَيْهِ» (translation: May the peace of Allah be upon him) or «صَلَواتُ ﷲِ وَ سَلامِه عَلَیه» (translation: May the peace and blessings of Allah be upon him). According to some researchers, Salawat is expressed in more than 210 different Arabic phrases in Islamic sources.

Salawat with the text «اللَّهُمَّ صَلِّ عَلَی مُحَمَّدٍ وَ آلِ مُحَمَّد», meaning "O Allah, send blessings upon Muhammad and his family", or with the text «اللَّهُمَّ صَلِّ عَلَی مُحَمَّدٍ وَ آلِ مُحَمَّد و عَجِّل فَرَجَهُم», meaning "O Allah, send blessings upon Muhammad and his family and hasten their attainment", is an Islamic invocation used to honor Muhammad and his family. The most famous form of Salawat throughout history and according to the sources, has been to say it in the form of «اللَّهُمَّ صَلِّ عَلَی مُحَمَّدٍ وَ آلِ مُحَمَّد», meaning "O Allah, send blessings upon Muhammad and his household". In Islamic circles, when the name of Muhammad is mentioned, it is customary to send blessings upon him to respect his high position. Also, the recitation of Salawat is used in worship because of its virtue and reward, and sometimes people even vow to recite a specific number of it (for example, 100, 200, or 1000) in order to have their heartfelt desires (called "Haajat" in Islamic thoughts), so that through this, they may receive God's grace and their problems may be resolved.

== Significance ==
In Islam, when a Muslim or angel (malak) recites salawat, it means they are sending it to Muhammad and are showing God their respect for Muhammad, while when the same is sending upon Muhammad by God himself, it means he is blessed by God (name of God in Islam). "When Muhammad sends Salawat upon the believers, it indicates his prayer for their welfare, blessing and salvation."

Muhammad was also reported to have said: "The meanest person is he who does not invoke Salawat upon me when my name is mentioned in his presence."

Ibn Asakri transmitted from al-Hasan bin Ali that Muhammad said: "Invoke more Salawat upon me, for your invocation is conducive to your sins being forgiven. And pray for me a high status and intercession, for surely my intercession will plead in your favour before Allah."

According to Ja'far al-Sadiq, Muhammad said: "All supplications to Allah will remain in a veil from the sky until a Salawat is sent to Mohammad PBUH and his Household." In another tradition, Ja'far al-Sadiq was quoted that: "Whoever sends Salawat on the Prophet PBH and his Household means 'I am standing on the promise that I gave when Allah asked me, 'Am I not your lord? And I answered yes you are.'"

== The concept of "Aal" in Salawat ==
When the companions and friends of Muhammad asked him: "How should we send blessings, peace, and greetings upon you?" Muhammad included the word «آلِ», "Aal" (meaning family, household or progeny) in his Salawat and asked for all the mercy and blessings that were requested from God for his family too, this meaning, Muhammad wants all the mercy and blessings that were requested from God in Salawat for his "family" or his "household" or his "progeny" (including the Twelve Imams with Muhammad's daughter, Fatima, or the so-called the Fourteen Infallibles in Twelver Shia doctrine).

== How to cite Salawat ==
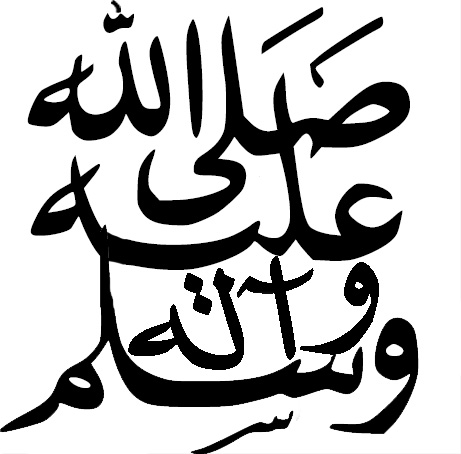
"Blessings of God be upon him and his household and peace" (صَلَّىٰ ﷲ عَلَيْهِ وَآلِهِ وَسَلَّمَ)

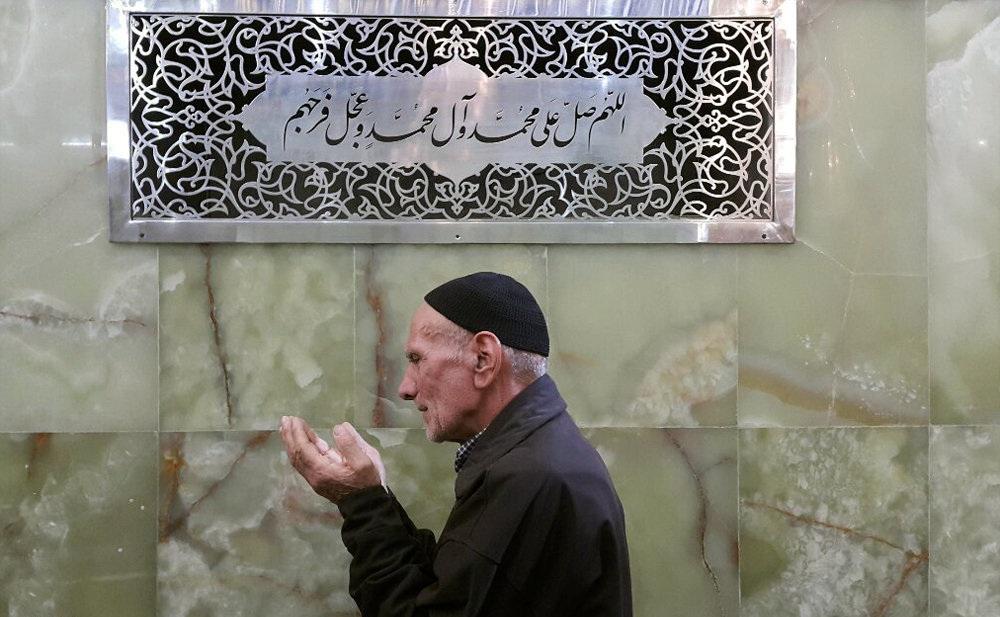
An artistic frame of Salawat with the inscription: Arabic: اللَّهُمَّ صَلِّ عَلَی مُحَمَّدٍ وَ آلِ مُحَمَّد و عَجِّل فَرَجَهُم, meaning "O Allah, send blessings upon Muhammad and the family of Muhammad, and hasten their release", installed in an Islamic religious site (the Al-Askari Shrine in Samarra).

In the many Islamic orison writings, explained how to greet Muhammad according to the traditions. In the book "Sahih al-Bukhari" written by Muhammad al-Bukhari, it is narrated from "Abu Saeed al-Khudri" that: "We said, O Messenger of God! Peace be upon you is known; how should we send blessings upon you?", the Prophet said:

«قُولُوا الّلهُمَّ صَلِّ عَلى مُحَمَّد عَبْدِکَ وَ رَسُولِکَ کَما صَلَّیْتَ على اِبْراهیمَ و آلِ اِبْراهیمَ وَ بارِکْ عَلى مُحَمَّد وَ عَلى آلِ مُحَمَّد کما بارَکْتَ على اِبْراهیمَ»

Meaning:

"Say, O Allah! Send peace upon Muhammad, Your servant and Your Messenger, as You sent peace upon Ibrahim and upon the family of Ibrahim, and send blessings upon Muhammad and upon the family of Muhammad, as You sent blessings upon Ibrahim."

In the same book and on the same page, this Hadith is narrated in more detail from "Ka’b ibn Ujrah" (one of the companions of Muhammad) who said to Muhammad: "We have learned how to greet you, but how should we send blessings upon you?" Muhammad said "you should say":

«اللّهُمَّ صَلِّ عَلى مُحَمَّد وَ عَلى آلِ مُحَمَّد کَما صَلَّیْتَ عَلى آلِ اِبْراهیمَ اِنَّکَ حَمیدٌ مَجیدٌ، اَلّلهُمَّ بارِکْ عَلى مُحَمَّد وَ عَلى آلِ مُحَمَّد کَما بارَکْتَ عَلى آلِ اِبْراهیمَ اِنَّکَ حَمیدٌ مَجیدٌ»

Meaning:

"O Allah, send peace upon Muhammad and the family of Muhammad, as You sent peace upon Ibrahim and the family of Ibrahim, for You are Praiseworthy and Glorious, and bless Muhammad and the family of Muhammad, as You bestowed blessings upon Ibrahim and the family of Ibrahim, for You are Praiseworthy and Glorious."

Note that Al-Bukhari mentions these Hadiths under the verse 56 of Surah Al-Ahzab: «اِنَّ اللهَ وَ مَلائِکَتَهُ یُصَلُّونَ عَلَى النَّبِىِّ یا اَیُّهَا الَّذینَ آمَنُوا صَلُّوا عَلَیْهِ وَ سَلِّمُوا تَسْلیما», meaning, "Indeed, Allah confers blessing upon the Prophet, and His angels [ask Him to do so]. O you who have believed, ask [Allah to confer] blessing upon him and ask [Allah to grant him] peace".

In the book Sahih Muslim written by Muslim ibn al-Hajjaj, which is the second most famous Hadith reference book for Sunni Muslims, it is narrated from “Abi Mas’ud al-Ansari” that: The Prophet came to us while we were in the assembly of "Sa’d ibn Ibadah", then "Bashir", the son of "Sa’d", said: "O Messenger of God! God has commanded us to send blessings upon you, how should we send blessings upon you?". The Prophet was silent at first, then he said "you should say":

«اللّهُمَّ صَلِّ عَلى مُحَمَّد وَ عَلى آلِ مُحَمَّد کَما صَلَّیْتَ عَلى آلِ اِبْراهیمَ، بارِکْ عَلى مُحَمَّد وَ عَلى آلِ مُحَمَّد کما بارَکْتَ عَلى آلِ اِبْراهیمَ فى الْعالَمینَ اِنَّکَ حَمیدٌ مَجیدٌ»

Meaning:

"O Allah, send peace upon Muhammad and the family of Muhammad as You sent peace upon the family of Ibrahim. Send blessings upon Muhammad and the family of Muhammad as You sent blessings upon the family of Ibrahim to the worlds. You are the Praiseworthy and the Glorious."

In one of the Sunni interpretation books called "Al-Dur al-Manthur" by Jalaluddin al-Suyuti, which is the most famous book of narration interpretation among Sunnis, the author cites the same narration of "Abu Saeed al-Khudri" from "Sahih al-Bukhari", "Ahmad ibn Shu'ayb al-Nasa'i", "Ibn Majah", and "Ibn Mardavieh" on behalf of Muhammad. In the same book, the same statement of “Abi Mas’ud al-Ansari” has been narrated by Muhammad al-Tirmidhi, "Ahmad ibn Shu'ayb al-Nasa'i", and "Ibn Mardavieh". Again, in the same book, the same content is narrated, with slight differences, by "Malik ibn Anas", "Sahih al-Bukhari", "Abu Dawud al-Sijistani", "Ahmad ibn Shu'ayb al-Nasa'i", "Ibn Majah", "Ibn Mardavieh", and several others, on behalf of "Abu Ahmad Sa'idi".

"Ahmad ibn Husayn ibn Ali Bayhaqi Neishaburi" known as "al-Bayhaqi" also narrated numerous narrations in this regard in his famous book "Sunan al-Kubra", some of which clarify the duties of Muslims during prayer and during the Tashahhud (one of the parts of prayer). For example, in a hadith narrated by "Uqbah ibn Amr": A man came and sat in the presence of the Prophet, while we were also with the Prophet. He said: "O Messenger of God! We know the quality of greetings upon you, but how should we send blessings upon you when we pray?" The Prophet remained silent [for a while], until we thought, "I wish this man had not asked such a question." Then the Prophet said:

«اِذا اَنْتُمْ صَلَّیْتُمْ عَلَىَّ فَقُولُوا الّلهُمَّ صَلَّ عَلى مُحَمَّد النَّبِىِّ الاٌمِىِّ وَ عَلى آلِ مُحَمَّد، کَما صَلَّیْتَ عَلى اِبْراهیمَ وَ عَلى آلِ اِبْراهیمَ وَ بارِکْ عَلَى مُحَمَّد النَّبىِّ الاٌمِىِّ وَ عَلى آلِ مُحَمَّد کَما بارَکْتَ عَلى اِبْراهیمَ وَ عَلى آلِ اِبْراهیمَ، اِنَّکَ حَمیدٌ مَجیدٌ»

Meaning:

"If you pray for me, say: O Allah, send peace upon Muhammad, the illiterate prophet, and his family, as You sent peace upon Ibrahim and the family of Ibrahim, and bless Muhammad, the illiterate prophet, and his family, as You blessed Ibrahim and the family of Ibrahim. Indeed, You are the Praiseworthy, the Glorious.

Then the author "al-Bayhaqi" quotes Muhammad ibn Idris al-Shafi'i as saying:

"This is an authentic Hadith that talks about reciting Salawat upon the Prophet of Islam during prayers."

"Al-Bayhaqi" has also cited numerous other hadiths regarding how to recite Salawat upon Muhammad, both during the prayer and outside of the prayer; In particular, in a Hadith narrated by "Ka'b ibn Ujrah" on behalf of Muhammad, he states:

اِنَّه کانَ یَقُولُ فى الصَّلوهِ: «الّلهُمَّ صَلِّ عَلى مُحَمَّد وَ آلِ مُحَمَّد کَما صَلَّیْتَ عَلى اِبْراهیمَ و آلِ اِبْراهیمَ وَ بارِکْ عَلى مُحَّمَد وَ آلِ مُحَمَّد کَما بارَکْتَ عَلى اِبْراهیمَ اِنَّکَ حَمیدٌ مَجیدٌ»

Meaning:

The Prophet of Islam used to say in his prayer: "O Allah, send peace upon Muhammad and the family of Muhammad as You sent peace upon Ibrahim and the family of Ibrahim, and send blessings upon Muhammad and the family of Muhammad as You sent blessings upon Ibrahim. Indeed, You are Praiseworthy, Glorious."

"Al-Bayhaqi" says in one of the narrations in which there is no mention of prayer:

"These narrations are also related to reciting Salawat upon the Prophet of Islam during Salah (the prayer in Islam); Because the sentence «قَدْ عَلِمْنا کَیْفَ نُسَلِّمُ», meaning, “We know how to send peace upon you”, refers to the sending peace in the Tashahhud (one of the parts of prayer) and in the "Salaam" (the last part of prayer): «السَّلامُ عَلَیْکَ اَیُّهَا النَّبىُّ وَ رَحْمَهُ اللهِ وَ بَرَکاتُه», meaning, “Peace be unto you O’ prophet and the mercy and all blessings of God”. Therefore, one of the meanings of the "sending blessings to the Prophet", refers to reciting Salawat during the Tashahhud (one of the parts of prayer)."

Therefore, all Muslims, regardless of their sects, are obligated to say the greetings of peace upon Muhammad in the form of «السَّلامَ عَلَیْکَ اَیُّهَا النَّبىُّ وَ رَحْمَهُ الله», meaning, “Peace be unto you O’ prophet and the mercy of God” during the Tashahhud in the prayer, as Muhammad himself used to say.

Although there is a slight difference of opinion among the four major Sunni schools of Islamic jurisprudence within Sunni Islam on this matter; In the Shafi'i school and in the Hanbali school, they said: It is obligatory to reciting Salawat upon the Prophet of Islam during the second Tashahhud in Salah, while in the Maliki school and in the Hanafi school, consider it as an arbitrary tradition or Sunnah.

This is despite the fact that according to most narrations, including the above narrations, the Salawat in the prayer is obligatory upon all Muslims.

== Recommended Salawat ==
One salawat recommended by Muhammad is:

ʾAllāhumma ṣalli ʿalā Muḥammadin wa ʿalā ʾāli Muḥammadin kamā ṣallayta ʿalā ʾIbrāhīma wa ʿalā ʾāli ʾIbrāhīma ʾinnaka Ḥamīdun Majīdun ʾAllāhumma bārik ʿalā Muḥammadin wa ʿalā ʾāli Muḥammadin kamā bārakta ʿalā ʾIbrāhīma wa ʿalā ʾāli ʾIbrāhīma ʾinnaka Ḥamīdun Majīdun

ٱللَّٰهُمَّ صَلِّ عَلَىٰ مُحَمَّدٍ وَعَلَىٰ آلِ مُحَمَّدٍ كَمَا صَلَّيْتَ عَلَىٰ إِبْرَاهِيمَ وَعَلَىٰ آلِ إِبْرَاهِيمَ إِنَّكَ حَمِيدٌ مَجِيدٌ ٱللَّٰهُمَّ بَارِكْ عَلَىٰ مُحَمَّدٍ وَعَلَىٰ آلِ مُحَمَّدٍ كَمَا بَارَكْتَ عَلَىٰ إِبْرَاهِيمَ وَعَلَىٰ آلِ إِبْرَاهِيمَ إِنَّكَ حَمِيدٌ مَجِيدٌ

Translation:

O God, sanctify Muhammad and the family of Muhammad, as you have sanctified Ibrahim and the family of Ibrahim. Truly, You are Praiseworthy and Glorious. O God, bless Muhammad and the family of Muhammad, as you have blessed Ibrahim and the family of Ibrahim. Truly, You are Praiseworthy and Glorious.

Muhammad was also reported to have said: "Do not invoke incomplete salawat upon me". His sahabah asked him: "What is incomplete salawat?" He replied them: "When you say: 'O God, send blessing to Muhammad' and then stop on that. Rather say: ٱللَّٰهُمَّ صَلِّ عَلَىٰ مُحَمَّدٍ وَعَلَىٰ آلِ مُحَمَّدٍ 'Allahumma! send Your blessing to Muhammad and the progeny of Muhammad."

== Variants of Salawat ==
Several variant phrases of salawat may be used. The most common phrases are:

Arabic	Transliteration IPA	Phrase
ٱللَّٰهُمَّ صَلِّ عَلَىٰ مُحَمَّدٍ وَآلِ مُحَمَّدٍ	ʾallāhumma ṣalli ʿalā muḥammadin wa-ʾāli muḥammad^{in} /ʔaɫ.ɫaː.hum.ma sˤal.li ʕa.laː mu.ħam.ma.din wa.ʔaː.li mu.ħam.ma.din/	O God, send blessings upon Muhammad and the Progeny of Muhammad.
ٱللَّٰهُمَّ صَلِّ عَلَىٰ مُحَمَّدٍ وَعَلىٰ آلِ مُحَمَّدٍ	ʾallāhumma ṣalli ʿalā muḥammadin wa-ʾalā ʾāli muḥammad^{in} /ʔaɫ.ɫaː.hum.ma sˤal.li ʕa.laː mu.ħam.ma.din wa.ʕa.laː ʔaː.li mu.ħam.ma.din/	O God, send blessings upon Muhammad and upon the Progeny of Muhammad.
ٱللَّٰهُمَّ صَلِّ وَسَلِّمْ عَلَىٰ مُحَمَّدٍ وَعَلىٰ آلِ مُحَمَّدٍ	ʾallāhumma ṣalli wa-sallim ʿalā muḥammadin wa-ʾalā ʾāli muḥammad^{in} /ʔaɫ.ɫaː.hum.ma sˤal.li wa.sal.lim ʕa.laː mu.ħam.ma.din wa.ʕa.laː ʔaː.li mu.ħam.ma.din/	O God, send blessings and peace upon Muhammad and upon the Progeny of Muhammad.
ٱللَّٰهُمَّ صَلِّ وَسَلِّمْ وَبَارِكْ عَلَىٰ مُحَمَّدٍ وَعَلىٰ آلِ مُحَمَّدٍ	ʾallāhumma ṣalli wa-sallim wa-bārik ʿalā muḥammadin wa-ʾalā ʾāli muḥammad^{in} /ʔaɫ.ɫaː.hum.ma sˤal.li wa.sal.lim wa.baː.rik ʕa.laː mu.ħam.ma.din wa.ʕa.laː ʔaː.li mu.ħam.ma.din/	O God, send blessings and peace and benediction upon Muhammad and upon the Progeny of Muhammad.
ٱللَّٰهُمَّ صَلِّ وَسَلِّمْ وَبَارِكْ عَلَىٰ مُحَمَّدٍ وَعَلىٰ آلِ مُحَمَّدٍ أَجْمَعِينَ وَعَلىٰ جَمِيعِ ٱلْمَلَائِكَةِ وَجَمِيعِ ٱلْأَنْبِيَاءِ وَٱلْمُرْسَلِينَ وَٱلشُّهَدَاءِ وَٱلصِّدِّيقِينَ وَجَمِيعِ عِبَادِ ٱللَّٰهِ ٱلصَّالِحِينَ	ʾallāhumma ṣalli wa-sallim wa-bārik ʿalā muḥammadin wa-ʾalā ʾāli muḥammadin ʾajmaʿīna wa-ʿalā jamīʿi l-malāʾikati wa-jamīʿi l-ʾanbiyāʾi wa-l-mursalīna wa-š-šuhadāʾi wa-ṣ-ṣiddīqīna wa-jamīʿi ʿibādi -llāhi ṣ-ṣāliḥīn^{a} /ʔaɫ.ɫaː.hum.ma sˤal.li wa.sal.lim wa.baː.rik ʕa.laː mu.ħam.ma.din wa.ʕa.laː ʔaː.li mu.ħam.ma.din ʔad͡ʒ.ma.ʕiː.na wa.ʕa.laː d͡ʒa.miː.ʕi‿l.ma.laː.ʔi.ka.ti wa.d͡ʒa.miː.ʕi‿l.ʔan.bi.jaː.ʔi wal.mur.sa.liː.na waʃ.ʃu.ha.daː.ʔi wasˤ.sˤid.diː.qiː.na wa.d͡ʒa.miː.ʕi ʕi.baː.di‿l.laː.hi‿sˤ.sˤaː.li.ħiː.na/	O God, send blessings and peace and benediction upon Muhammad and upon the Progeny of Muhammad all together, and upon all of the Angels, and [upon] all of the Prophets, Messengers, martyrs and truthful ones, and [upon] all of the righteous servants of God.
ٱللَّٰهُمَّ صَلِّ عَلَىٰ مُحَمَّدٍ وَآلِ مُحَمَّدٍ وَعَجِّلْ لِوَلِيِّكَ ٱلْفَرَجَ وَٱلْعَافِيَةَ وَٱلنَّصْرَ	ʾallāhumma ṣalli ʿalā muḥammadin wa-ʾāli muḥammadin wa-ʿajjil li-walīyika l-faraja wa-l-ʿāfiyata wa-n-naṣr^{a} /ʔaɫ.ɫaː.hum.ma sˤal.li ʕa.laː mu.ħam.ma.din wa.ʔaː.li mu.ħam.ma.din wa.ʕad͡ʒ.d͡ʒil li.wa.liː.ji.ka‿l.fa.ra.d͡ʒa wal.ʕaː.fi.ja.ta wan.nasˤ.ra/	O God, bless Muhammad and the Progeny of Muhammad, and hasten the alleviation of your vicegerent (i.e. Imam Mahdi), and grant him vitality and victory. (Usually recited by Shia Muslims)
ٱللَّٰهُمَّ صَلِّ عَلَىٰ مُحَمَّدٍ وَآلِ مُحَمَّدٍ وَعَجِّلْ فَرَجَهُمْ	ʾallāhumma ṣalli ʿalā muḥammadin wa-ʾāli muḥammadin wa-ʿajjil farajahum /ʔaɫ.ɫaː.hum.ma sˤal.li ʕa.laː mu.ħam.ma.din wa.ʔaː.li mu.ħam.ma.din wa.ʕad͡ʒ.d͡ʒil fa.ra.d͡ʒa.hum/	O God, bless Muhammad and the Progeny of Muhammad, and hasten their alleviation. (Usually recited by Shia Muslims)
ٱللَّٰهُمَّ صَلِّ عَلَىٰ مُحَمَّدٍ وَآلِ مُحَمَّدٍ وَعَجِّلْ فَرَجَهُمْ وَٱلْعَنْ أَعْدَاءَهُمْ	ʾallāhumma ṣalli ʿalā muḥammadin wa-ʾāli muḥammadin wa-ʿajjil farajahum wa-lʿan ʾaʿdāʾahum /ʔaɫ.ɫaː.hum.ma sˤal.li ʕa.laː mu.ħam.ma.din wa.ʔaː.li mu.ħam.ma.din wa.ʕad͡ʒ.d͡ʒil fa.ra.d͡ʒa.hum wal.ʕan ʔaʕ.daː.ʔa.hum/	O God, bless Muhammad and the Progeny of Muhammad, and hasten their alleviation and curse their enemies. (Usually recited by Shia Muslims)

According to some researchers, Salawat is expressed in more than 210 different Arabic phrases in Islamic sources. The famous Salawats mentioned in narrations and Hadith are listed below:

Sources	Phrases
[Al-Nasa'i / 1292, Sahih]	ٱللَّٰهُمَّ صَلِّ عَلَىٰ مُحَمَّدٍ وَآلِ مُحَمَّدٍ
[Abbas Qomi / 1344, Safinat al-Bihar]	الّلهُمَّ صَلِّ عَلَی مُحَمَّدٍ وَ آلِ مُحَمَّدٍ و عَجّل فَرَجَهم
[Al-Nasa'i / 1289, Sahih]	ٱللَّٰهُمَّ صَلِّ عَلَىٰ مُحَمَّدٍ وَعَلَىٰ آلِ مُحَمَّدٍ كَمَا صَلَّيْتَ عَلَىٰ إِبْرَاهِيمَ وَعَلَىٰ آلِ إِبْرَاهِيمَ إِنَّكَ حَمِيدٌ مَجِيدٌ ٱللَّٰهُمَّ بَارِكْ عَلَىٰ مُحَمَّدٍ وَعَلَىٰ آلِ مُحَمَّدٍ كَمَا بَارَكْتَ عَلَىٰ إِبْرَاهِيمَ وَعَلَىٰ آلِ إِبْرَاهِيمَ إِنَّكَ حَمِيدٌ مَجِيدٌ
[Al-Muwatta / 459, Sahih], [Ibn Hibban / 1958, Sahih]	ٱللَّٰهُمَّ صَلِّ عَلَىٰ مُحَمَّدٍ وَعَلَىٰ آلِ مُحَمَّدٍ كَمَا صَلَّيْتَ عَلَىٰ إِبْرَاهِيمَ وَ بَارِكْ عَلَىٰ مُحَمَّدٍ وَعَلَىٰ آلِ مُحَمَّدٍ كَمَا بَارَكْتَ عَلَىٰ عَلَىٰ آلِ إِبْرَاهِيمَ فِي ٱلْعَالَمِينَ إِنَّكَ حَمِيدٌ مَجِيدٌ
[Al-Nasa'i / 1291, Sahih]	ٱللَّٰهُمَّ صَلِّ عَلَىٰ مُحَمَّدٍ وَعَلَىٰ آلِ مُحَمَّدٍ كَمَا صَلَّيْتَ عَلَىٰ إِبْرَاهِيمَ إِنَّكَ حَمِيدٌ مَجِيدٌ وَبَارِكْ عَلَىٰ مُحَمَّدٍ وَعَلَىٰ آلِ مُحَمَّدٍ كَمَا بَارَكْتَ عَلَىٰ إِبْرَاهِيمَ إِنَّكَ حَمِيدٌ مَجِيدٌ
[Al-Bukhari / 4519], [Ibn Majah / 904, Sahih]	ٱللَّٰهُمَّ صَلِّ عَلَىٰ مُحَمَّدٍ وَعَلَىٰ آلِ مُحَمَّدٍ كَمَا صَلَّيْتَ عَلَىٰ إِبْرَاهِيمَ إِنَّكَ حَمِيدٌ مَجِيدٌ ٱللَّٰهُمَّ بَارِكْ عَلَىٰ مُحَمَّدٍ وَعَلَىٰ آلِ مُحَمَّدٍ كَمَا بَارَكْتَ عَلَىٰ إِبْرَاهِيمَ إِنَّكَ حَمِيدٌ مَجِيدٌ
[Muslim / 405], [Al-Muwatta / 459, Sahih], [Al-Nasa'i / 1285, Sahih], [Ibn Hibban / 1965, Sahih]	ٱللَّٰهُمَّ صَلِّ عَلَىٰ مُحَمَّدٍ وَعَلَىٰ آلِ مُحَمَّدٍ كَمَا صَلَّيْتَ عَلَىٰ آلِ إِبْرَاهِيمَ وَبَارِكْ عَلَىٰ مُحَمَّدٍ وَعَلَىٰ آلِ مُحَمَّدٍ كَمَا بَارَكْتَ عَلَىٰ آلِ إِبْرَاهِيمَ فِي ٱلْعَالَمِينَ إِنَّكَ حَمِيدٌ مَجِيدٌ
[Muslim / 406]	ٱللَّٰهُمَّ صَلِّ عَلَىٰ مُحَمَّدٍ وَعَلَىٰ آلِ مُحَمَّدٍ كَمَا صَلَّيْتَ عَلَىٰ آلِ إِبْرَاهِيمَ إِنَّك حَمِيدٌ مَجِيدٌ وَبِارِكْ عَلَىٰ مُحَمَّدٍ وَعَلَىٰ آلِ مُحَمَّدٍ كَمَا بَارَكْتَ عَلَىٰ آلِ إِبْرَاهِيمَ إِنَّكَ حَمِيدٌ مَجِيدٌ
[Ibn Hibban / 1964, Sahih], [Al-Bukhari / 5996], [Muslim / 406], [Al-Nasa'i / 1257, Sahih]	ٱللَّٰهُمَّ صَلِّ عَلَىٰ مُحَمَّدٍ وَعَلَىٰ آلِ مُحَمَّدٍ كَمَا صَلَّيْتَ عَلَىٰ آلِ إِبْرَاهِيمَ إِنَّك حَمِيدٌ مَجِيدٌ ٱللَّٰهُمَّ بِارِكْ عَلَىٰ مُحَمَّدٍ وَعَلَىٰ آلِ مُحَمَّدٍ كَمَا بَارَكْتَ عَلَىٰ آلِ إِبْرَاهِيمَ إِنَّكَ حَمِيدٌ مَجِيدٌ
[Al-Nasa'i / 1288, Sahih], [Al-Nasa'i / 1290, Sahih], [Ibn Hibban / 1957, Sahih]	ٱللَّٰهُمَّ صَلِّ عَلَىٰ مُحَمَّدٍ وَعَلَىٰ آلِ مُحَمَّدٍ كَمَا صَلَّيْتَ عَلَىٰ إِبْرَاهِيمَ وَآلِ إِبْرَاهِيمَ إِنَّكَ حَمِيدٌ مَجِيدٌ وَبَارِكْ عَلَىٰ مُحَمَّدٍ وَعَلَىٰ آلِ مُحَمَّدٍ كَمَا بَارَكْتَ عَلَىٰ إِبْرَاهِيمَ وَآلِ إِبْرَاهِيمَ إِنَّكَ حَمِيدٌ مَجِيدٌ
[Al-Bukhari / 3190]	ٱللَّٰهُمَّ صَلِّ عَلَىٰ مُحَمَّدٍ وَعَلَىٰ آلِ مُحَمَّدٍ كَمَا صَلَّيْتَ عَلَىٰ إِبْرَاهِيمَ وَعَلَىٰ آلِ إِبْرَاهِيمَ إِنَّكَ حَمِيدٌ مَجِيدٌ ٱللَّٰهُمَّ بَارِكْ عَلَىٰ مُحَمَّدٍ وَعَلَىٰ آلِ مُحَمَّدٍ كَمَا بَارَكْتَ عَلَىٰ إِبْرَاهِيمَ وَعَلَىٰ آلِ إِبْرَاهِيمَ إِنَّكَ حَمِيدٌ مَجِيدٌ
[Ibn Hibban / 1959, Isnadat Sahih]	ٱللَّٰهُمَّ صَلِّ عَلَىٰ مُحَمَّدٍ ٱلنَّبِيِّ ٱلأُمِّيِّ وَعَلَىٰ آلِ مُحَمَّدٍ كَمَا صَلَّيْتَ عَلَىٰ إِبْرَاهِيمَ وَعَلَىٰ آلِ إِبْرَاهِيمَ وَبَارِكْ عَلَىٰ مُحَمَّدٍ ٱلنَّبِيِّ ٱلأُمِّيِّ وَعَلَىٰ آلِ مُحَمَّدٍ كَمَا بَارَكْتَ عَلَىٰ إِبْرَاهِيمَ وَعَلَىٰ آلِ إِبْرَاهِيمَ إِنَّكَ حَمِيدٌ مَجِيدٌ
[Ibn Majah / 903, Sahih]	ٱللَّٰهُمَّ صَلِّ عَلَىٰ مُحَمَّدٍ عَبْدِكَ وَرَسُولِكَ كَمَا صَلَّيْتَ عَلَىٰ إِبْرَاهِيمَ وَبَارِكْ عَلَىٰ مُحَمَّدٍ وَعَلَىٰ آلِ مُحَمَّدٍ كَمَا بَارَكْتَ عَلَىٰ إِبْرَاهِيمَ
[Al-Bukhari / 5997]	ٱللَّٰهُمَّ صَلِّ عَلَىٰ مُحَمَّدٍ عَبْدِكَ وَرَسُولِكَ كَمَا صَلَّيْتَ عَلَىٰ إِبْرَاهِيمَ وَبَارِكْ عَلَىٰ مُحَمَّدٍ وَعَلَىٰ آلِ مُحَمَّدٍ كَمَا بَارَكْتَ عَلَىٰ إِبْرَاهِيمَ وَآلِ إِبْرَاهِيمَ
[Al-Nasa'i / 1293, Sahih]	ٱللَّٰهُمَّ صَلِّ عَلَىٰ مُحَمَّدٍ عَبْدِكَ وَرَسُولِكَ كَمَا صَلَّيْتَ عَلَىٰ إِبْرَاهِيمَ وَبَارِكْ عَلَىٰ مُحَمَّدٍ وَآلِ مُحَمَّدٍ كَمَا بَارَكْتَ عَلَىٰ إِبْرَاهِيمَ
[Al-Bukhari / 4520]	ٱللَّٰهُمَّ صَلِّ عَلَىٰ مُحَمَّدٍ عَبْدِكَ وَرَسُولِكَ كَمَا صَلَّيْتَ عَلَىٰ إِبْرَاهِيمَ وَبَارِكْ عَلَىٰ مُحَمَّدٍ وَآلِ مُحَمَّدٍ كَمَا بَارَكْتَ عَلَىٰ إِبْرَاهِيمَ وَآلِ إِبْرَاهِيمَ
[Al-Bukhari / 4520]	ٱللَّٰهُمَّ صَلِّ عَلَىٰ مُحَمَّدٍ عَبْدِكَ وَرَسُولِكَ كَمَا صَلَّيْتَ عَلَىٰ آل إِبْرَاهِيمَ وَبَارِكْ عَلَىٰ مُحَمَّدٍ وَعَلَىٰ آلِ مُحَمَّدٍ كَمَا بَارَكْتَ عَلَىٰ إِبْرَاهِيمَ
[Al-Bukhari / 4520]	ٱللَّٰهُمَّ صَلِّ عَلَىٰ مُحَمَّدٍ عَبْدِكَ وَرَسُولِكَ كَمَا صَلَّيْتَ عَلَىٰ آل إِبْرَاهِيمَ وَبَارِكْ عَلَىٰ مُحَمَّدٍ وَعَلَىٰ آلِ مُحَمَّدٍ كَمَا بَارَكْتَ عَلَىٰ آلِ إِبْرَاهِيمَ
[Al-Bukhari / 3189]	ٱللَّٰهُمَّ صَلِّ عَلَىٰ مُحَمَّدٍ وَأَزْوَاجِهِ وَذُرِّيَّتِهِ كَمَا صَلَّيْتَ عَلَىٰ إِبْرَاهِيمَ وَبَارِكْ عَلَىٰ مُحَمَّدٍ وَأَزْوَاجِهِ وَذُرِّيَّتِهِ كَمَا بَارَكْتَ عَلَىٰ آلِ إِبْرَاهِيمَ إِنَّكَ حَمِيدٌ مَجِيدٌ
[Ibn Majah / 905, Sahih]	ٱللَّٰهُمَّ صَلِّ عَلَىٰ مُحَمَّدٍ وَأَزْوَاجِهِ وَذُرِّيَّتِهِ كَمَا صَلَّيْتَ عَلَىٰ إِبْرَاهِيمَ وَبَارِكْ عَلَىٰ مُحَمَّدٍ وَأَزْوَاجِهِ وَذُرِّيَّتِهِ كَمَا بَارَكْتَ عَلَىٰ آلِ إِبْرَاهِيمَ فِي ٱلْعَالَمِينَ إِنَّكَ حَمِيدٌ مَجِيدٌ
[Al-Nasa'i / 1294, Sahih], [Al-Bukhari / 5999], [Al-Muwatta / 458, Sahih]	ٱللَّٰهُمَّ صَلِّ عَلَىٰ مُحَمَّدٍ وَأَزْوَاجِهِ وَذُرِّيَّتِهِ كَمَا صَلَّيْتَ عَلَىٰ آلِ إِبْرَاهِيمَ وَبَارِكْ عَلَىٰ مُحَمَّدٍ وَأَزْوَاجِهِ وَذُرِّيَّتِهِ كَمَا بَارَكْتَ عَلَىٰ آلِ إِبْرَاهِيمَ إِنَّكَ حَمِيدٌ مَجِيدٌ
[Muslim / 407]	ٱللَّٰهُمَّ صَلِّ عَلَىٰ مُحَمَّدٍ وَعَلَىٰ أَزْوَاجِهِ وَذُرِّيَّتِهِ كَمَا صَلَّيْتَ عَلَىٰ آلِ إِبْرَاهِيمَ وَبَارِكْ عَلَىٰ مُحَمَّدٍ وَعَلَىٰ أَزْوَاجِهِ وَذُرِّيَّتِهِ كَمَا بَارَكْتَ عَلَىٰ آلِ إِبْرَاهِيمَ إِنَّكَ حَمِيدٌ مَجِيدٌ
[Al-Nasa'i / 1286, Isnadat Sahih]	ٱللَّٰهُمَّ صَلِّ عَلَىٰ مُحَمَّدٍ كَمَا صَلَّيْتَ عَلَىٰ آلِ إِبْرَاهِيمَ ٱللَّٰهُمَّ بَارِكْ عَلَىٰ مُحَمَّدٍ كَمَا بَارَكْتَ عَلَىٰ آلِ إِبْرَاهِيمَ

== Benefits ==
It is said that whoever sends 10 salawat upon Muhammad and his household will be sent a thousand salawat by God and his angels, and whoever sends 1,000 salawat upon Muhammad and his household will not be affected by the fire of hell.

Sending salawat upon Muhammad and his progeny is said to pave the way for his intercession on the day of judgement, serve as a compensation for sins, and to be the most weighty deed on the scale of deeds. Salawat upon Muhammad and his households is said to lead to the affection of God and his messenger, to purify deeds, and to serve as the light in the grave, As-Sirāt bridge and Paradise.

Salawat is said to be one of the best deeds on Friday, and is said to lighten and open the heart.

Reciting salawat aloud is said to vanish hypocrisy, and continuous recitation of salawat is said to fulfil one's worldly and heavenly wants (supplication).

It is mentioned in verse 56 of Surah Al-Ahzab: «اِنَّ اللهَ وَ مَلائِکَتَهُ یُصَلُّونَ عَلَى النَّبِىِّ یا اَیُّهَا الَّذینَ آمَنُوا صَلُّوا عَلَیْهِ وَ سَلِّمُوا تَسْلیما», meaning “Indeed, Allah confers blessing upon the Prophet, and His angels [ask Him to do so]. O you who have believed, ask [Allah to confer] blessing upon him and ask [Allah to grant him] peace.” There are numerous narrations and discussions in the Islamic world about the reason of sending blessings (Salawat) upon Muhammad. The first reason of sending blessings upon Muhammad is so that he and his status among people should not be forgotten. In this way, sending blessings upon Muhammad helps in some way to preserve Islam and the name of Muhammad. In some books dedicated to Islamic worship instructions, it is mentioned that sending blessings upon Muhammad causes the person sending the blessings to become good-natured and well-minded, and the sins of the person sending the blessings to be forgiven. As it is mentioned in the pilgrimage of Jami'ah Kabirah:

«وَ جَعَلَ صَلاَتَنَا عَلَيْكُمْ وَ مَا خَصَّنَا بِهِ مِنْ وِلاَيَتِكُمْ طِيباً لِخُلْقِنَا وَ طَهَارَةً لاَِنْفُسِنَا وَ تَزْكِيَةً لَنَا وَ كَفَّارَةً لِذُنُوبِنَا»

"God has made our prayers upon you (the Prophet and his family) and your guardianship over us the cause of moral purity, purity of minds, spiritual growth and progress, and atonement for our sins."

In other narrations, reciting Salawat in the form of «اللَّهُمَّ صَلِّ عَلَی مُحَمَّدٍ وَ آلِ مُحَمَّد», meaning "O Allah, send blessings upon Muhammad and his family" is mentioned as a factor in the forgiveness of sins. On the other hand, reciting Salawat and peace upon Muhammad and his family, or reciting Salawat upon other prophets and other great figures, is a form of gratitude and appreciation for the efforts that these individuals have made to guide people. Gratitude and appreciation for a useful thing is a kind and noble behavior.

== Unicode ==
Unicode
encoding utf-8	sign	name unicode	transcription	Arabic	English
&#65018;	ﷺ	Arabic sign SALLALLAHOU ALAYHE WASSALLAM	SallAllahu alayhi was Sallam	صَلَّىٰ ٱللَّٰهُ عَلَيْهِ وَسَلَّمَ	Peace and blessings of Allah be upon him

== See also ==
- Salat al-Fatih
- Ahl al-Bayt
- Ahl al-Kisa
- Twelve Imams
- Fourteen Infallibles
- Ya Muhammad
- Dhikr
- Peace be upon him
- Madih nabawi
- Nasheed
- Dala'il al-Khayrat
- Al-Majdi
