= Ziyarat Jami'ah Kabirah =

Ziyarat Jamiah Kabirah (Arabic: الزيارة الجامعة الكبيرة, Persian: زیارت جامعه کبیره) is a Twelver Shi’i Muslim ziyarat "pilgrimage prayer". This visitation awarded by the tenth Imam, Ali al-Hadi, to Musa ibn Abdullah Nakhi at his request to teach him a comprehensive way of paying homage to any of the Imams during pilgrimage in their shrines or from far away places.

Shi'i pilgrimage prayer works is the kind of work that is at odds with the special visitation as a pious pilgrimage. In this kind of prayer, pilgrimage can be used for each of the Shi'i Imams alone or read all of them.

According to Shi'i sources, whoever recites this ziyarat with love and cognizance of the divinely appointed Imams is purified from diseases of soul and body and all worries if the Imam intercedes for him. A pilgrim, who obeys the Imam, refrains from all sins and all of his good deeds which lack in perfection are accepted by God.

== Definition ==
Jamiah Kabirah is the most famous salutation works for the Twelver Shia. Yet many reasons to call this works as "complete" is mentioned measures are applied comprehensiveness, universality and comprehensiveness theme of time and place. The functional integrity, described the pilgrimage as a completeness because it can be used as a pilgrimage place every imam. The recall time-place, described the pilgrimage as a completeness because it does not have a specific time and place, or imam. Based on the comprehensive content, the prayer includes all the attributes of Imams and detailed descriptions of their virtues. Sayyed Ibn Tawus' criteria to describe this kind of pilgrimage to the word "society", mentioning the name of every inmate knows. The term "so-called shrine of pilgrimage for the first time known as ibn Babawayh used to refer to a pilgrimage to the grave.

== Background ==
Muhammad Baqir Majlisi counts nearly fourteen pilgrimage books. Of course the phrase of Ziyarat Jamiah does not definite more accurately. Meanwhile it is not such a way that whole of the pilgrimage books attributed to Shi'i imams but the most famous of these pilgrimage attributed to them in spite. There are many famous Ziyarat in spite of Jamiah kabirah such as Amin allah, jamiah gheyre Mashhoura and Mosafeghah Ziyarat. also it is evident that there is no direct to the Ziyarat until Ibn Babawayh.

== Content ==
The Jamiah can be divided into four parts. The first part started with Greeting and salutation onto pure Shi'i Imams and concerned with in turn with four subfields such as praising Imams in terms of being relativity to Muhammad, guiding of Islamic nations, being the Shi'i Imams as symbols of God's knowledge and generosity. the theme into five main sections divided:

- Salam (greeting)
- Witness
- Expressed interests
- Because of the width of devotion
- Pray and appeal
- The reason of width of devotion

The first part including five greetings and encompass 20 to 30 features of Imam in relation to his real existence.

== Validity ==
Ibn Babawayh in his book Man lā yahduruhu al-Faqīh asserted the validity of the pilgrimage," and also Shaykh Tusi in his book "refinement Akhbar" have refereed to . Mohsen Fayz Kashani in interpretation "Wafi", Allama Muhammad Baqir Majlisi in his book "Bihar al-Anwar "And Ayatollah Boroujerdi in" comprehensive Alahadys "have acknowledged the validity of the pilgrimage. Javadi Amoli valid document the pilgrimage is a pilgrimage because it believes that the issue of non-innocent is impossible.

Many Muslim scholars referred to the text and document as a pilgrimage work to an Imam's grave just as the narrator of "Musa Ibn Omran Nakhaee" known as a trusted and reliable figures and anecdotal. [13] Allama Majlisi, Mohammad Taghi, Seyed Abdullah Shebra are among them. Muhammad Baqir Majlisi points to the pilgrimage as the best and most eloquent known pilgrimages among the Shia.

== Interpretation ==
There are many references to the Pilgrimages since the 18th century in theology, jurisprudence and hermeneutics. Some of the interpretations are as follow:

- A short interpretation by Allame Majlesi in Bihar
- The book of Al Aalam Al lamiah by Moḥammad Mahdī Baḥr al-ʿUlūm
- A treatise by Ahmad Ahsaei.
- A collection of commentaries by Abdollah Javadi-Amoli by the name of" politeness of annihilation of those who are approximate to God.
- One of the most prominent and in depth interpretation of this Holy Ziyarah is the interpretation of Sheikh Abdul Haleem Al-Ghezzi. He expounded a 30 episode program explaining this noble Ziyarah on Al-Mawaddah TV Channel in 2010. This interpretation can also be found on the English YouTube Channel named "Fatima's Path" which is ascribed to the Sheikh.
