= Tashahhud =

Portion of the Muslim prayer

The Tashahhud (Arabic: تَشَهُّد, meaning "testimony [of faith]"), also known as at-Tahiyyat (Arabic: ٱلتَّحِيَّات), is the portion of the Muslim prayer where the person kneels or sits on the ground facing the qibla (direction of Mecca), glorifies God, and greets Muhammad and the "righteous servants of God" followed by the two testimonials. The recitation is usually followed by an invocation of the blessings and peace upon Muhammad known as Salawat.

== Origins ==
There is a hadith that states:

Ibn Mas'ud is reported to have said that the Messenger of God (peace be upon him) taught me tashahhud taking my hand within his palms, in the same way as he taught me the chapter of the Quran, and we also read it after his passing away.

== Sunni tradition ==
=== Hanafi and Hanbali ===
A version attributed to Abdullah ibn Masud in Sahih al-Bukhari is used by Sunni Muslims from both the Hanafi and the Hanbali schools, as well as the non-Sunni Ibadi Muslims:

ٱلتَّحِيَّاتُ لِلَّٰهِ وَٱلصَّلَوَاتُ وَٱلطَّيِّبَاتُ، ٱلسَّلَامُ عَلَيْكَ أَيُّهَا ٱلنَّبِيُّ وَرَحْمَةُ ٱللَّٰهِ وَبَرَكَاتُهُ، ٱلسَّلَامُ عَلَيْنَا وَعَلَىٰ عِبَادِ ٱللَّٰهِ ٱلصَّالِحِينَ، أَشْهَدُ أَنْ لَا إِلَٰهَ إِلَّا ٱللَّٰهُ، وَأَشْهَدُ أَنَّ مُحَمَّدًا عَبْدُهُ وَرَسُولُهُ.

at-taḥiyyātu li-llāhi, wa-ṣ-ṣalawātu wa-ṭ-ṭayyibāt^{u}. as-salāmu ʿalayka ʾayyuhā n-nabiyyu wa raḥmatu -llāhi wa barakātuh^{u}. as-salāmu ʿalaynā wa ʿalā ʿibādi -llāhi ṣ-ṣāliḥīn^{a}. ʾashhadu ʾan lā ʾilāha ʾillā -llāhu wa ʾashhadu ʾanna muḥammadan ʿabduhu wa rasūluh^{ū}.

"Salutations to God and prayers and good deeds. Peace be upon you, O Prophet, as well as God's mercy and His blessings. Peace be upon us and upon the righteous servants of God. I bear witness that there is no deity but God, and I bear witness that Muhammad is His servant and His messenger."

=== Maliki ===
A version attributed to Umar is used by the Maliki school, as found in Malik's Al-Muwatta:

ٱلتَّحِيَّاتُ لِلَّٰهِ ٱلزَّاكِيَاتُ لِلَّٰهِ ٱلطَّيِّبَاتُ وَٱلصَّلَوَاتُ لِلَّٰهِ ٱلسَّلَامُ عَلَيْكَ أَيُّهَا ٱلنَّبِيُّ وَرَحْمَةُ ٱللَّٰهِ وَبَرَكَاتُهُ، ٱلسَّلَامُ عَلَيْنَا وَعَلَىٰ عِبَادِ ٱللَّٰهُ ٱلصَّالِحِينَ، أَشْهَدُ أَنْ لَا إِلَٰهَ إِلَّا ٱللَّٰهُ، وَأَشْهَدُ أَنَّ مُحَمَّدًا عَبْدُهُ وَرَسُولُهُ.

at-taḥīyātu li-llāhi, az-zākiyātu li-llāhi aṭ-ṭayyibātu wa-ṣ-ṣalawātu li-llāh^{i}. as-salāmu ʿalayka ayyuhā n-nabīyu wa-raḥmatu -llāhi wa-barakātuh^{u}. as-salāmu ʿalaynā wa-ʿalā ʿibādi -llāhi ṣ-ṣāliḥīn^{a}. ʾashhadu an lā ʾilāha ʾillā -llāhu wa-ʾashhadu ʾanna muḥammadan ʿabduhū wa-rasūluh^{ū}.

"Salutations to God. Pureness to God. Good deeds and prayers to God. Peace be upon you, O Prophet, as well as God's mercy and His blessings. Peace be upon us and upon the righteous servants of God. I bear witness that there is no deity but God, and I bear witness that Muhammad is His servant and His messenger."

=== Shafi'i ===
A version attributed to Ibn Abbas is used by the Shafi'i school, as found in Sahih Muslim:

ٱلتَّحِيَّاتُ ٱلْمُبَارَكَاتُ ٱلصَّلَوَاتُ ٱلطَّيِّبَاتُ لِلَّٰهِ، ٱلسَّلَامُ عَلَيْكَ أَيُّهَا ٱلنَّبِيُّ وَرَحْمَةُ ٱللَّٰهِ وَبَرَكَاتُهُ، ٱلسَّلَامُ عَلَيْنَا وَعَلَىٰ عِبَادِ ٱللَّٰهُ ٱلصَّالِحِينَ، أَشْهَدُ أَنْ لَا إِلَٰهَ إِلَّا ٱللَّٰهُ، وَأَشْهَدُ أَنَّ مُحَمَّدًا رَسُولُ ٱللَّٰهِ.

at-taḥīyātu l-mubārakātu ṣ-ṣalawātu ṭ-ṭayyibātu li-llāh^{i}. as-salāmu ʿalayka ʾayyuhā n-nabīyu wa-raḥmatu -llāhi wa-barakātuhu. as-salāmu ʿalaynā wa-ʿala ʿibādi llāhi ṣ-ṣāliḥīn^{a}. ʾashhadu ʾan lā ʾilāha ʾillā -llāhu wa-ʾashhadu ʾanna muḥammadan rasūlu -llāh^{i}.

"Blessed salutations, prayers, good deeds to God. Peace be upon you, O Prophet, as well as God's mercy and His blessings. Peace be upon us and upon the righteous servants of God. I bear witness that there is no deity but God, and I bear witness that Muhammad is His servant and His messenger."

== Shia tradition ==
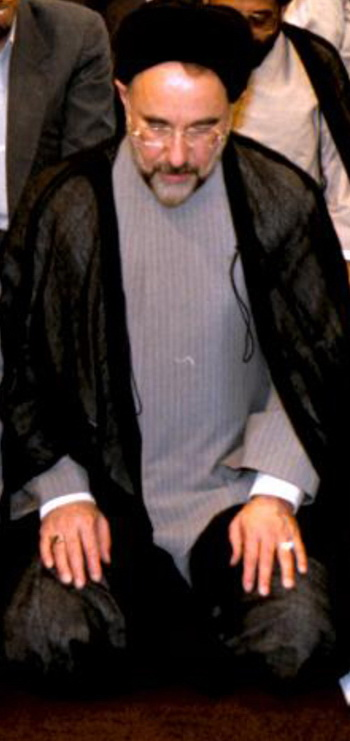
Former Iranian President Mohammad Khatami, who is a Shia cleric, in Tashahhud during a Salat.

=== Jafari ===
The Twelver Shias of the Ja'fari school recite the Tashahhud as:

أَشْهَدُ أَنْ لَا إِلَٰهَ إِلَّا ٱللَّٰهُ وَحْدَهُ لَا شَرِيكَ لَهُ، وأَشْهَدُ أَنَّ مُحَمَّدًا عَبْدُهُ وَرَسُولُهُ.‌ ٱللَّٰهُمَّ صَلِّ عَلَىٰ مُحَمَّدٍ وَآلِ مُحَمَّدٍ.

ʾashhadu ʾan lā ilāha ʾillā -llāhu waḥdahū lā sharīka lahū wa-ʾashhadu ʾanna muḥhammadan ʿabduhū wa-rasūluh^{ū}. ʾallāhumma ṣalli ʿalā muḥammadin wa-ʾāli muḥammad^{in}.

"I bear witness that there is no deity but God, the One, there is no partner to Him, and I bear witness that Muhammad is His servant and His messenger. O God, send blessings upon Muhammad and the family of Muhammad."

The Tashahhud is followed by the Salam. The bare minimum is to say "as-salamu ʿalaykum" (Arabic: ٱلسَّلَامُ عَلَيْكُمْ, lit. 'peace be upon you'). It is highly recommended, though, to add "wa-raḥmatu -llāhi wa-barakātuh" (Arabic: وَرَحْمَةُ ٱللَّٰهِ وَبَرَكَاتُهُ, lit. 'and God's mercy and blessings') .

It is highly recommended, though, to recite in the Salam of the prayer:

ٱلسَّلَامُ عَلَيْكَ أَيُّهَا ٱلنَّبِيُّ وَرَحْمَةُ ٱللَّٰهِ وَبَرَكَاتُهُ، ٱلسَّلَامُ عَلَيْنَا وَعَلَىٰ عِبَادِ ٱللَّٰهِ ٱلصَّالِحِينَ، ٱلسَّلَامُ عَلَيْكُمْ وَرَحْمَةُ ٱللَّٰهِ وَبَرَكَاتُهُ

as-salāmu ʿalayka ʿayyuhā n-nabīyu wa-raḥmatu -llāhi wa-barakātuh^{u}, as-salāmu ʿalaynā wa-ʿalā ʿibādi -llāhi ṣ-ṣaliḥīn^{a}, as-salāmu ʿalaykum wa-raḥmatu -llāhi wa-barakātuh^{ū}.

"Peace be upon you, O Prophet, as well as God's mercy and His blessings. Peace be upon us and upon the righteous servants of God. Peace be upon you all, as well as God's mercy and His blessings."

It is also recommended to say "Bismillahi wa billahi wa al-hamdulillahi wa khairil asma'ilillah"before tashahud. After the tashahud, it can also be said,"wa taqabbal shafa'atahu warfa' darajatahu". Additionally, recitation of dua and dhikr during tashahud is a prophetic sunnah, according to the Jafari Madhhab.

=== Zaidi ===
For the Zaidi, the middle Tashahhud after the second rakʿah is recited as:

Bismillahi wa Billahi wa alhamdulillahi wal-asmā`ul-husna kulluhā lillahi. Ashhadu an lā ilāha ila Allāhu wahdahu lā sharīka lahu wa ashhadu anna Muhammadan abduhu wa rasūluhu "In the name of God, and upon God [is reliance]. Praise be to God, and the Beautiful names are all for the Lord. I bear witness that there is no god, but God alone, and without partners. And I bear witness that Muḥammad is His servant and Messenger."

After the last rakʿah, the Zaidi recite the Tashahhud in its full formula:

Bismillahi wa Billahi wa alhamdulillahi wal-asmā`ul-husna kulluhā lillahi.(Or alternatively: At-tahiyyātu lillāhi was-šalawāt waŧ-ŧayyibātu.) Ashhadu an lā ilāha ila Allāhu wahdahu lā sharīka lahu wa ashhadu anna Muhammadan abduhu wa rasūluhu. Allāhumma salli ‘ala Muhammad wa āli Muhammad. Wa bārik ‘ala Muhammad wa āli Muhammad. Ka mā salayta wa bārakta ‘ala Ibrāhīm wa ‘ala āli Ibrāhīm. Innaka Hamīdun Majīd "In the name of God, and upon God [is reliance]. Praise be to God, and the Beautiful names are all for the Lord. I bear witness that there is no god, but God alone, and without partners. And I bear witness that Muḥammad is His servant and Messenger. O God send Your blessings upon Muḥammad, and the family of Muḥammad. And bless Muḥammad and the family of Muḥammad as You have blessed and sanctified Abraham, and the family of Abraham. You are truly worthy of praise, Full of glory."

== See also ==
- Shahadah
- Adhan
- Iqamah
- Salawat
- Dhikr
- Peace be upon him
