= Islamic honorifics =

Laudatory religious phrases in Islam

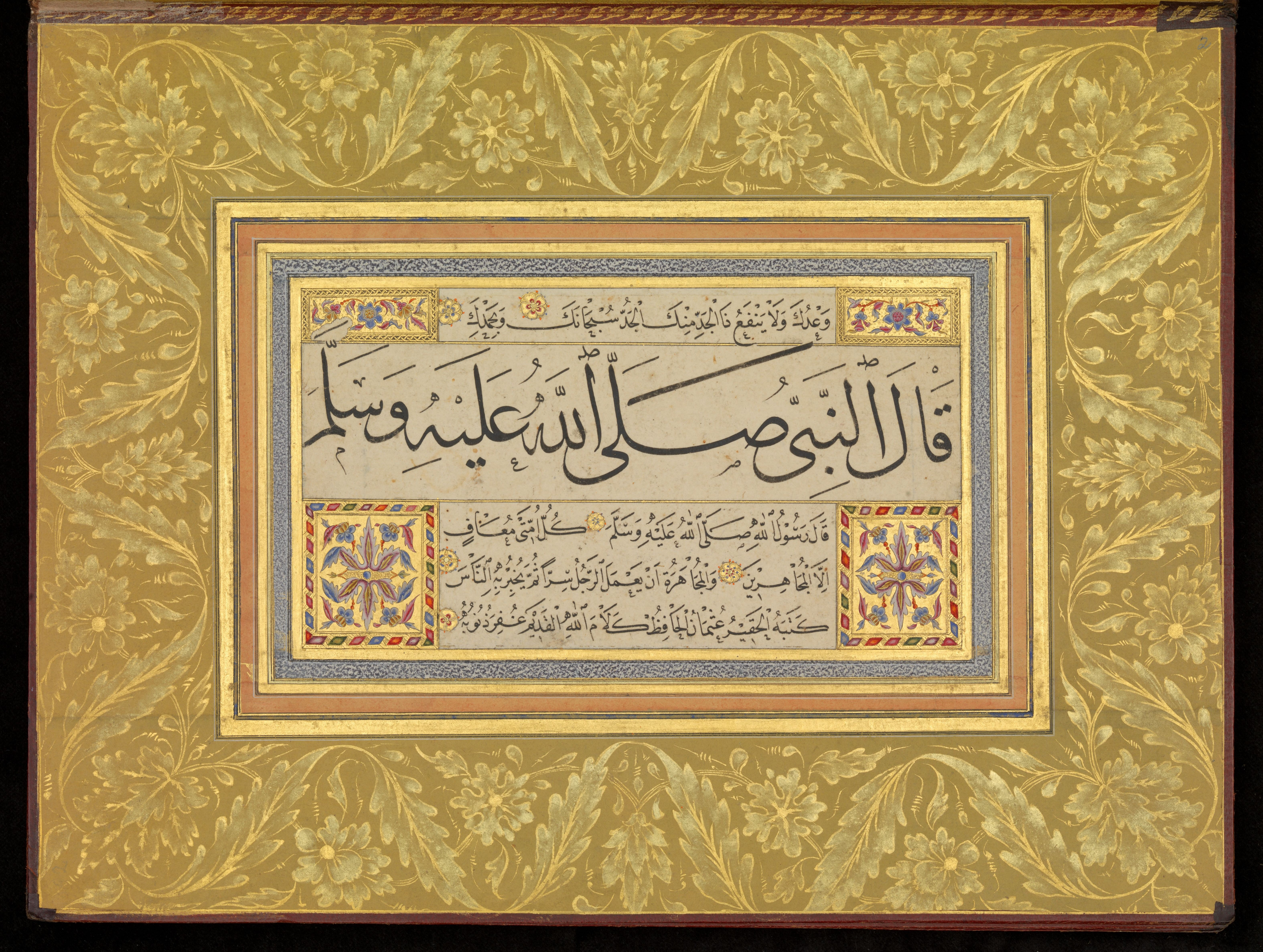
A calligraphic composition by Hâfiz Osman which used the honorific Islamic suffix phrase صَلَّى ٱللَّٰهُ عَلَيْهِ وَ سَلَّم, meaning 'May God send His mercy and blessings upon him', after referring to the Islamic prophet Muhammad.

Islamic honorifics are Arabic phrases, abbreviations, and titles that mostly appear as prefixes before or suffixes after the names of people who have had a special mission from Allah in the Islamic world or have done important work towards these missions. In Islamic writings, these honorific prefixes and suffixes come before and after the names of all the prophets and messengers (the last of whom is Muhammad), the Imams (the Twelve Imams in Shia Islam), the infallibles in Shia Islam, and the prominent individuals (tabi'un) who followed them. In the Islamic world, giving these respectful prefixes and suffixes is a tradition.

Among the most important honorific prefixes used are Hadhrat (حَضرَت, lit. 'a special person in the sight of God, a person who has a special mission from God, holiness, sainthood, excellency, majesty'). and Imam (اِمام, lit. 'a person who has a special position with God, a person who receives religious guidance from God to convey to people, an Islamic leadership position, leader, fugleman, headman, pontiff, primate'). Among the most important honorific suffixes used are صَلَّى ٱللَّٰهُ عَلَيْه (lit. 'May God's blessings and peace be upon him') and صَلَّى ٱللَّٰهُ عَلَيْهِ وَ آلِه (lit. 'May God's blessings and peace be upon him and his household'), which these two suffix phrases used specifically for the Islamic prophet Muhammad in Islamic world, its abbreviation is also given in parentheses as ص in Arabic and "PBUH" in English after the name of Muhammad. And the two suffix phrases عَلَيْهِ ٱلسَّلَام (lit. 'Peace be upon him') and عَلَيْهَا ٱلسَّلَام (lit. 'Peace be upon her') are used when the name of each of the fourteen infallibles saints is mentioned or written in Islamic world and the most especially in the Shia Islam world, its abbreviation is also given in parentheses as ع in Arabic and "AS" in English after the name of the fourteen infallibles. And also the two suffix phrases رَضِيَ ٱللَّٰهُ عَنْهُ (lit. 'God be pleased with him') and رَضِيَ ٱللَّٰهُ عَنْهَا (lit. 'God be pleased with her') are used when the name of each of the companions of Muhammad is mentioned or written in Islamic world and the most especially in the Sunni Islam world, its abbreviation is also given in parentheses as ر in Arabic and "RA" in English after the name of the companions of Muhammad.

These glorifying expressions are also used for God Himself and His angels. Generally, for His angels, the phrase عَلَيْهِ ٱلسَّلَام (lit. 'Peace be upon him') is commonly used, and for God, usually His perfection attributes are used, such as the suffix جَلَّ جَلَالُهُ (lit. 'The most exalted').

Islam uses a number of conventionally complimentary phrases wishing-well or praising religiously-esteemed figures including Allah, Muhammad (Messenger of God), Muhammad's companions (the sahaba), family (Ahl al-Bayt), other Islamic prophets and messengers, angels, and revered persons. In Twelver Shi'ism, honorifics are used with the Twelve Imams.

Also, Islamic honorifics are referred to as Salawāt (صَلَوات, lit. 'Blessings of God') in the shape of اللَّهُمَّ صَلِّ عَلَی مُحَمَّدٍ وَ آلِ مُحَمَّد (lit. 'O Allah, bless Muhammed and the family of Muhammed.') and also in Shia Islam in the shape of اللَّهُمَّ صَلِّ عَلَی مُحَمَّدٍ وَ آلِ مُحَمَّد و عَجِّل فَرَجَهُم (lit. 'O Allah, bless Muhammad and the family of Muhammad and hasten their relief'), in Arabic too, which their meaning is equal to the phrase خداوندا بر محمد و خاندانش رحمت فرست و فرجشان را نزدیک بفرما (lit. 'O God, bless Muhammad and the Progeny of Muhammad, and hasten their alleviation') in Persian language which meaning requesting درود (lit. 'Peace') from God for Muhammad and his household in Urdu language too.

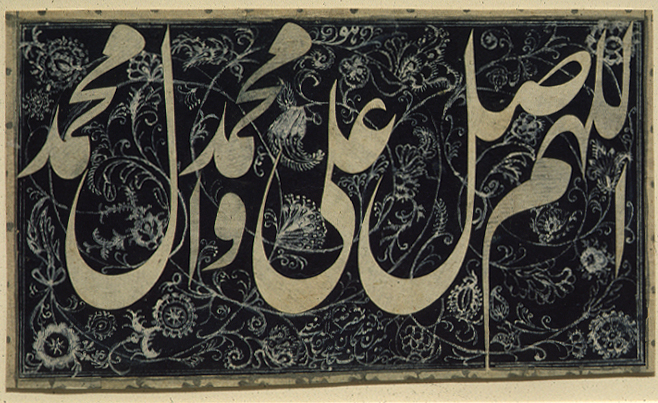
Calligraphic Arabic text of the common kind of "Salawat": Arabic: اللهم صل علی محمد و آل محمد, meaning "Blessings and peace be upon Muhammad and his family", in the handwriting of Shamsuddin Asaf Jahi

== Formatting ==
Islamic honorifics are not abbreviated in Arabic-script languages (e.g., Arabic, Persian, Urdu) given the rarity of acronyms and abbreviations in those languages, however, these honorifics are often abbreviated in other languages such as English, Spanish, and French. Common examples of these abbreviations include PBUH ('Peace be Upon Him') and SWT (subhanahu wa-ta'ala, 'Glorified and Exalted'). Though these honorifics may be abbreviated in writing, they are never abbreviated in speech. Abbreviations often vary in letter case and use of periods.

Arabic text of another shape of "Salawat": Arabic: «صَلَی اللهُ عَلَیه و سَلَّم», meaning "May God send His mercy and blessings upon him".

Honorifics, in Arabic or non-Arabic languages, can be written in multiple formats:

1. Arabic text with Islamic honorifics
  - Example: "لقد شارك رسول الله صلى الله عليه وسلم كلام الله سبحانه وتعالى كما أنزله عليه الملك جبريل عليه السلام مع صاحبه الوفي أبو بكر الصديق رَضِيَ اللَّهُ عَنْهُ"
2. English text with Islamic honorifics in romanized Arabic
  - Example: "The Messenger of God (ṣallā -llāhu ʿalayhi wa-sallam) shared the word of Allah (subḥānahu wa-taʿālā) as revealed to him by the angel Jibril (ʿalayhi as-salām) with his loyal companion, Abu Bakr as-Siddiq (raḍiya 'llāhu 'anhu)."
3. English text with unabbreviated Islamic honorifics
  - Example: "The Messenger of God (peace be upon him) shared the word of Allah (glorified and exalted) as revealed to him by the angel Jibril (peace be upon him) with his loyal companion, Abu Bakr as-Siddiq (Allah be pleased with him)."
4. English text with abbreviated Islamic honorifics
  - Example: "The Messenger of God (PBUH) shared the word of Allah (SWT) as revealed to him by the angel Jibril (AS) with his loyal companion, Abu Bakr as-Siddiq (RA)."

== List of honorifics ==
=== God (Allah) ===
Following the mention of God (Allah), including by pronoun (e.g., 'him' or 'his'), or by one of the names bestowed upon him, one of the below honorifics are said or written:

Suffixal Honorifics for Allah
Arabic	Single character in Unicode	Romanization	Abbreviation	Translation
سُبْحَانَهُۥ وَتَعَالَىٰ	﷾	subḥānahū wa-taʿālā	(SWT)	Glorified and exalted
تَبَارَكَ وَتَعَالَىٰ	﵎	tabāraka wa-taʿālā	(TWT)	Blessed and exalted
عَزَّ وَجَلَّ	﷿	ʿazza wa-jall	(AZWJ)	Prestigious and majestic / Mighty and sublime
جَلَّ جَلَالُهُ	ﷻ	jalla jalāluh^{ū}	(JJ)	Most exalted

=== Muhammad ===
Muhammad's name, reference to him through a pronoun (e.g., 'his' or 'him'), or the use of one of his titles (e.g., 'the messenger of Allah') is followed by one of the below honorifics. The honorific "Blessings of Allah be upon him as well as peace" is the most widely used. The use of the word "blessings" (ṣallā, صَلَّى) can be used for all Islamic prophets (and Shia Imams) equally, however it is almost exclusively used with Muhammad.

Sallā -llāhu ʿalayhi wa-sallam ('blessings of God and peace be upon him') written in Arabic

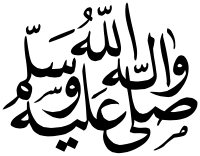
'Blessings of God be upon him and his progeny' in Arabic

Suffixal Honorifics for Muhammad
Arabic	Single character in Unicode	Romanization	Abbreviation	Translation
صَلَّى ٱللَّٰهُ عَلَيْهِۦ وَسَلَّمَ	ﷺ U+FDFA	ṣallā -llāhu ʿalayhī wa-sallam^{a}	(SAW), (SA), (PBUH)	May blessings of Allah be upon him as well as peace. English short: Peace be upon him
صَلَّى ٱللَّٰهُ عَلَيْهِۦ وَآلِهِۦ وَسَلَّمَ	Default universal character ﵌ U+FD4C	ṣallā -llāhu ʿalayhī wa-ʾālihī wa-sallam^{a}	(SAWW), (SAWS), (SA), (PBUHP)	May blessings of Allah be upon him and his progeny and grant him peace. English short: Peace be upon him and his progeny
صَلَّى ٱللَّٰهُ عَلَيْهِۦ وَآلِهِ	﵆ U+FD46	ṣallā -llāhu ʿalayhī wa-ʾālih^{ī}	(SAWA), (SA), (SAWW)	May blessings of Allah be upon him and his progeny (Note: Used more commonly by Shia Muslims)

=== Muhammad's companions ===
"May Allāh be pleased with him" in Arabic

Honorifics used for Muhammad's companions (aṣ-Ṣaẖābah) ask for Allah's pleasure with them. Muhammad's companions include men (Abu Bakr, Umar, Uthman, Ali, etc.) and women (e.g., Fatima bint Muhammad, Aisha bint Abu Bakr, Asma bint Abu Bakr, etc.), and are accorded the properly gendered honorifics.

Suffixal honorifics for the Sahaba
Arabic	Single character in Unicode	Romanization	Abbreviation	Translation
رَضِيَ ٱللَّٰهُ عَنْهُ	﵁ؓ U+0613 (accent used prefix or suffix to name)	raḍiya -llāhu ʿanh^{ū}	(RA)	May Allah be pleased with him
رَضِيَ ٱللَّٰهُ عَنْهَا	﵁ؓ U+0613 (accent used prefix or suffix to name)	raḍiya -llāhu ʿanhā	(RA)	May Allah be pleased with her
رَضِيَ ٱللَّٰهُ عَنْهُمَا	﵁ؓ U+0613 (accent used prefix or suffix to name)	raḍiya -llāhu ʿanhumā	(RA)	May Allah be pleased with them (dual)
رَضِيَ اللَّهُ عَنْهُمْ	﵁ؓ U+0613 (accent used prefix or suffix to name)	raḍiya -llāhu ʿanhum	(RA)	May Allah be pleased with them
رَضِيَ اللَّهُ عَنْهُنَّ	﵁ؓ U+0613 (accent used prefix or suffix to name)	raḍiya -llāhu ʿanhunn	(RA)	May Allah be pleased with them (Feminine plural)

=== Prophets, messengers, and Ahl al-Bayt ===
'Alay-hi 's-salām in Arabic script

Some honorifics apply to the archangels (Jibril, Mikhail, etc.) as well as any other Islamic prophets preceding Muhammad (e.g., Isa, Musa, Ibrahim etc.). A group of modern scholars from Imam Mohammad Ibn Saud Islamic University, Yemen, and Mauritania has issued fatwa that the angels should be invoked with blessing of alayhi al-salām, which also applied to human prophets and messengers. This fatwa was based on the ruling from Ibn Qayyim al-Jawziyya.

Some major hadith collections such as Sahih al-Bukhari, Sunan Abi Dawud, and Sunan al-Tirmidhi include narrations where members of the Ahl al-Bayt (the family of Muhammad), including Ali, Fatima, Hasan, and Husayn, are mentioned with ʿalayhi/ʿalayhā/ʿalayhim al-salām. In Shia Islam, Muhammad's progeny, referred to as Ahl al-Bayt (Arabic: أَهْل ٱلْبَيْت, lit. 'people of the house'), are addressed with the same honorifics as messengers.

Suffixal Honorifics for Prophets, Messengers, Angels and Ahl al-bayt
Arabic	Single character in Unicode	Romanization	Abbreviation	Translation
عَلَيْهِ ٱلسَّلَامُ	﵇	ʿalayhi -s-salām^{u}	(AS)	Peace be upon him
عَلَيْهَا ٱلسَّلَامُ	﵍	ʿalayhā -s-salām^{u}	(AS)	Peace be upon her
عَلَيْهِمَا ٱلسَّلَامُ	﵉	ʿalayhimā -s-salām^{u}	(AS)	Peace be upon them (dual)
عَلَيْهِمُ ٱلسَّلَامُ	﵈	ʿalayhimu -s-salām^{u}	(AS)	Peace be upon them (plural)
عَلَيْهِنَّ ٱلسَّلَامُ		ʿalayhinna -s-salām^{u}	(AS)	Peace be upon them (feminine plural)
عَلَيْهِ ٱلصَّلَاةُ وَٱلسَّلَامُ	﵊	ʿalayhi -ṣ-ṣalātu wa-s-salām^{u}	(ASWS)	Blessings and peace be upon him
عَلَيْهَا ٱلصَّلَاةُ وَٱلسَّلَامُ		ʿalayhā -ṣ-ṣalātu -s-salām^{u}	(ASWS)	Blessings and peace be upon her
عَلَيْهِمَا ٱلصَّلَاةُ وَٱلسَّلَامُ		ʿalayhimā -ṣ-ṣalātu -s-salām^{u}	(ASWS)	Blessings and peace be upon them (dual)
عَلَيْهِمُ ٱلصَّلَاةُ وَٱلسَّلَامُ		ʿalayhimu -ṣ-ṣalātu -s-salām^{u}	(ASWS)	Blessings and peace be upon them (plural)
عَلَيْهِنَّ ٱلسَّلَامُ		ʿalayhinna -ṣ-ṣalātu -s-salām^{u}	(ASWS)	Blessings and peace be upon them (feminine plural)
سَلَامُ ٱللَّٰهِ عَلَيْهِ		salāmu -llāhi ʿalayh^{ī}	(SA)	Allah's peace upon him
سَلَامُ ٱللَّٰهِ عَلَيْهَا		salāmu -llāhi ʿalayhā	(SA)	Allah's peace upon her
سَلَامُ ٱللَّٰهِ عَلَيْهِمَا		salāmu -llāhi ʿalayhimā	(SA)	Allah's peace upon them (dual)
سَلَامُ ٱللَّٰهِ عَلَيْهِمُ		salāmu -llāhi ʿalayhim	(SA)	Allah's peace upon them (plural)
سَلَامُ ٱللَّٰهِ عَلَيْهِنَّ		salāmu -llāhi ʿalayhinn^{a}	(SA)	Allah's peace upon them (feminine plural)

=== Revered men and women ===
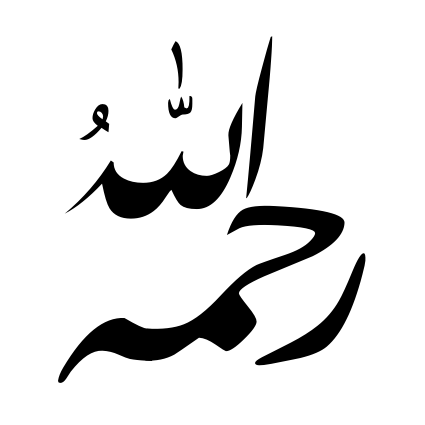
"May Allah's mercy be upon him" in Arabic

Some honorifics apply to highly-revered Islamic scholars and people thought to be of high spiritual rank. When that person has died, honorifics ask for Allah's mercy upon or pleasure with him or her. When that person is still living, honorifics customarily ask for Allah's preservation or relief.

Suffixal Honorifics for revered men and women
Arabic	Single character in Unicode	Romanization	Abbreviation	Translation
رَحْمَةُ ٱللَّٰهِ عَلَيْهِ		raḥmatu -llāhi ʿalayh^{ū}	(RH)	Allah's mercy upon him
رَحِمَهُ ٱللَّٰهُ	﵀	raḥimahu -llāh^{ū}	(RH)	Mercy upon him
رَحْمَةُ ٱللَّٰهِ عَلَيْهَا		raḥmatu -llāhi ʿalayhā	(RH)	Allah's mercy upon her
رَحِمَهَا ٱللَّٰهُ		raḥimahā -llāh^{ū}	(RH)	Mercy upon her
رَحْمَةُ ٱللَّٰهِ عَلَيْهِم		raḥmatu -llāhi ʿalayhim	(RH)	Allah's mercy upon them
رَحِمَهُمُ ٱللَّٰهُ	﵏	raḥimahumu -llāh^{ū}	(RH)	Mercy upon them
رِضْوَانُ ٱللَّٰهِ تَعَالَىٰ عَلَيْهِ		riḍwānu -llāhi ta'ālā ʿalayh^{ī}	(RA)	Allah be pleased with him
رِضْوَانُ ٱللَّٰهِ تَعَالَىٰ عَلَيْهَا		riḍwānu -llāhi ta'ālā ʿalayhā	(RA)	Allah be pleased with her
حَفِظَهُ ٱللَّٰهُ		hafiḏahu -llāh^{ū}	(HA)	Allah preserve him
حَفِظَهَا ٱللَّٰهُ		hafiḏahā 'llāh^{ū}	(HA)	Allah preserve her
فَرَّجَ ٱللَّٰهُ عَنْهُ		farraja -llāhu ʿanh^{ū}	(FA)	Allah grant him relief
فَرَّجَ ٱللَّٰهُ عَنْهَا		farraja -llāhu ʿanhā	(FA)	Allah grant her relief
رَضِيَ ٱللَّٰهُ عَنْهُ	﵁	raḍiya -llāhu ʿanh^{ū}	(RA)	May Allah be pleased with him
رَضِيَ ٱللَّٰهُ عَنْهَا	﵂	raḍiya -llāhu ʿanhā	(RA)	May Allah be pleased with her
رَضِيَ ٱللَّٰهُ عَنْهُمَا	﵄	raḍiya -llāhu ʿanhumā	(RA)	May Allah be pleased with them (dual)
رَضِيَ اللَّهُ عَنْهُمْ	﵃	raḍiya -llāhu ʿanhum	(RA)	May Allah be pleased with them
رَضِيَ اللَّهُ عَنْهُنَّ	﵅	raḍiya -llāhu ʿanhunn	(RA)	May Allah be pleased with them (Feminine plural)

== Scriptural and hadith basis ==
=== Qur'ān ===
Verse 33:56 in Arabic

The honorifics for Muhammad are enjoined by Surat al-Ahzab:

إِنَّ ٱللّٰهَ وَمَلَـٰٓىِٕكَتَهُۥ يُصَلُّونَ عَلَى ٱلنَّبِىِّ ۚ يَـٰٓأَيُّهَا ٱلَّذِينَ ءَامَنُوا۟ صَلُّوا۟ عَلَيْهِ وَسَلِّمُوا۟ تَسْلِيمًا
'Surely Allah (God) and His angels bless the Prophet; O you who believe! Send blessings on him and salute him with a (becoming) salutation.'
^{[Quran 33:56 (Translated by Shakir)]}

=== Hadiths from Sunni Islam ===
Al-Tirmidhi recorded that Abu Hurairah said, "The Messenger of Allah said, 'May he be humiliated, the man in whose presence I am mentioned and he does not send Salaam upon me; may he be humiliated, the man who sees the month of Ramadan come and go, and he is not forgiven; may he be humiliated, the man whose parents live to old age and they do not cause him to be granted admittance to Paradise.'" Al-Tirmidhi said that this hadith was ḥasan gharib, "good but only reported once".

In Sahih Muslim, Sunan Abu Dawood, Jami' at-Tirmidhi and al-Sunan al-Sughra, four of the six major hadith collections recorded that Abu Hurairah said, "The Messenger of Allah said: 'Whoever sends one Salaam upon me, Allah will send ten upon him.'"

Ahmad ibn Hanbal reported in his Musnad Ahmad ibn Hanbal that the Companion of Muhammad, Abu Talha ibn Thabit, said:

One morning the Messenger of Allah was in a cheerful mood and looked happy. They said, "O Messenger of Allah, this morning you are in a cheerful mood and look happy." He said, "Of course, just now someone [an angel] came to me from my Lord [Allah] and said, 'Whoever among your Ummah sends Salaam upon you, Allah will record for him ten good deeds and will erase for him ten evil deeds, and will raise his status by ten degrees, and will return his greeting with something similar to it.'"

Al-Bayhaqi reports that Abu Hurairah said that Muhammad said, "Send the Salaam on Allah's messengers and prophets for Allah sent them as He sent me."

This point is further founded in the saying by Muhammad, "The miser is the one in whose presence I am mentioned, then he does not send the Salam upon me." This was recorded in Musnad Ahmad ibn Hanbal.

Anas bin Malik said, "The Messenger of Allah (PBUH) said: 'Whoever sends salah upon me once, Allah (SWT) will send salah upon him tenfold, and will erase ten sins from him, and will raise him ten degrees in status.'"

— Collected by Al-Nasa'i, Al-Sunan al-Sughra, Book 13, Hadith 119

=== Criticism of abbreviations ===
Scholars of the Salafi branch of Islam practiced in Saudi Arabia have instructed their followers not to abbreviate the salawat upon Muhammad, but to instead write the full form. For example, Abd al-Aziz ibn Baz, the Grand Mufti of Saudi Arabia, said:

As it is prescribed to send prayers upon the Prophet (peace and prayers of Allah be upon him) in prayer when saying the tashahhud, and it is prescribed when giving khutbahs, saying Du'a and praying for forgiveness, and after the Adhan, and when entering and exiting the mosque, and when mentioning him in other circumstances, so it is more important to do so when writing his name in a book, letter, article and so on. So it is prescribed to write the prayers in full so as to fulfil the command that Allah has given to Muslims, and so that the reader will remember to say the prayers when he reads it. So one should not write the prayers on the Prophet (peace and prayers of Allah be upon him) in short form such as writing (S) or (SAWS) etc, or other forms that some writers use, because that is going against the command of Allah in His Book, where He says (interpretation of the meaning):

صَلُّوا۟ عَلَيْهِ وَسَلِّمُوا۟ تَسْلِيمًا

Send blessings on him and salute him with a (becoming) salutation."^{[Quran 33:56 (Translated by Shakir)]}

And that (writing it in abbreviated form) does not serve that purpose and is devoid of the virtue of writing "salla Allaahu 'alayhi wa sallam (May Allah send prayers and peace upon him)" in full. Moreover the reader may not take notice of it and may not understand what is meant by it. It should also be noted that the symbol used for it is regarded as disapproved by the scholars, who warned against it.

Official religious bodies such as Egypt’s Dar al-Iftaa and Jordan’s General Iftaa’ Department have also discouraged the use of abbreviations. Egypt’s Dar al-Iftaa classifies the use of abbreviations as a 'prohibited matter' according to scholars, viewing it as a sign of laziness to obtain rewards and rudeness toward Muhammad. Similarly, Jordan’s Iftaa’ Department states that while abbreviations should be avoided in writing, if they are used in a case of necessity, the practitioner must still pronounce the full blessing verbally.

== Unicode ==
Unicode
UTF-8 Encoding	Symbol	Unicode Name	Transcription	Arabic	English
&#1553;	ؑ	Arabic sign ALAYHE ASSALLAM	ʿalayhi s-salām	عليه السلام	Peace be upon him
&#1554;	ؒ	Arabic sign RAHMATULLAH ALAYHE	raḥmatu Llāhi ʿalayh	رحمة الله عليه	God have mercy upon him
&#1555;	ؓ	Arabic sign RADI ALLAHOU ANHU	raḍī Llāhu ʿanh	رضي الله عنه	God be pleased with him

== See also ==
- Honorifics in Judaism
- Honorifics in Sikhism
