= Inna lillahi wa inna ilayhi raji'un =

Islamic phrase on receiving bad news

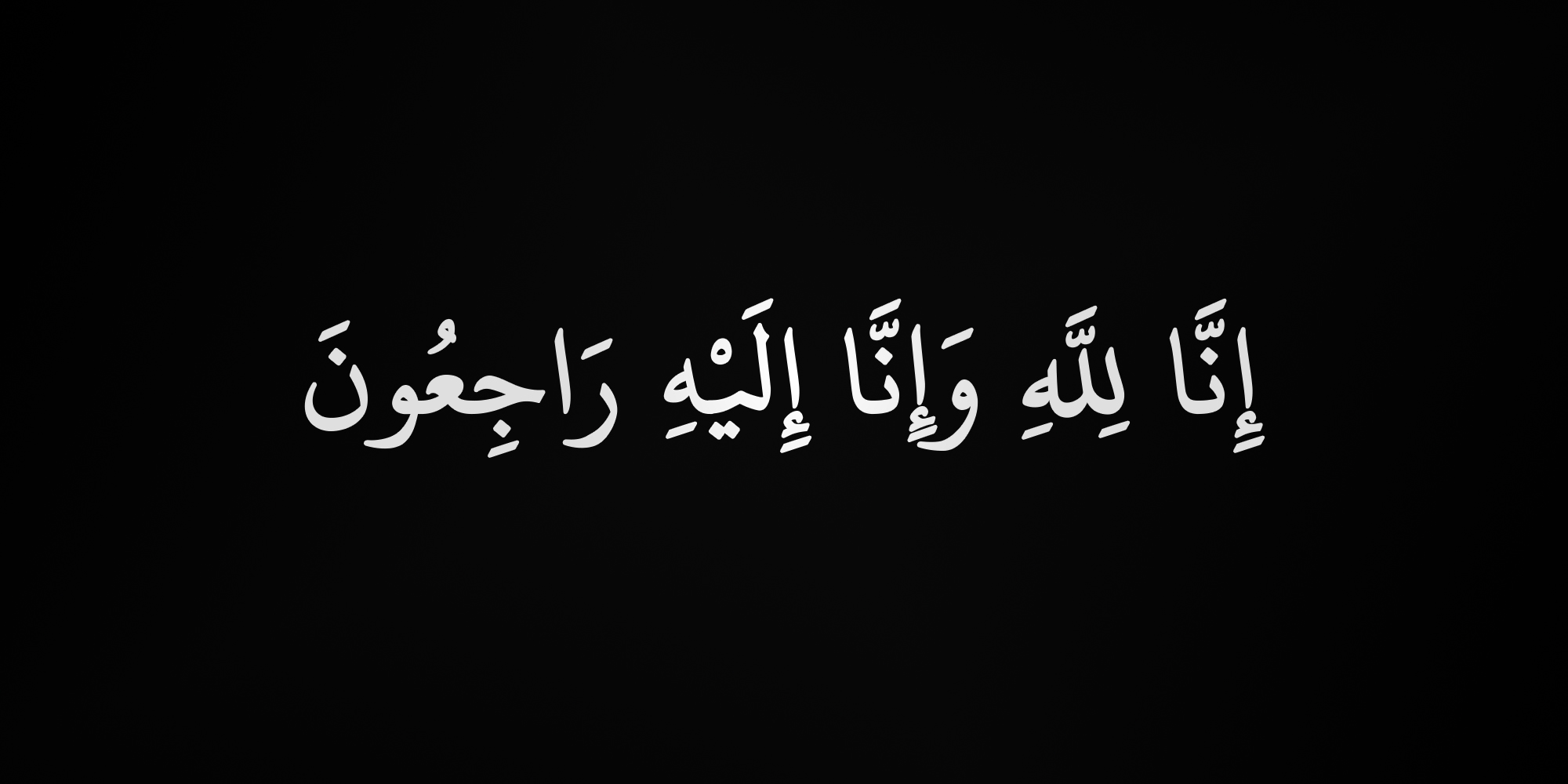
The phrase written in Arabic

Recitation of the Istirjāʿ in Quran 2:156, taken from a full recitation of Surah Al-Baqarah.

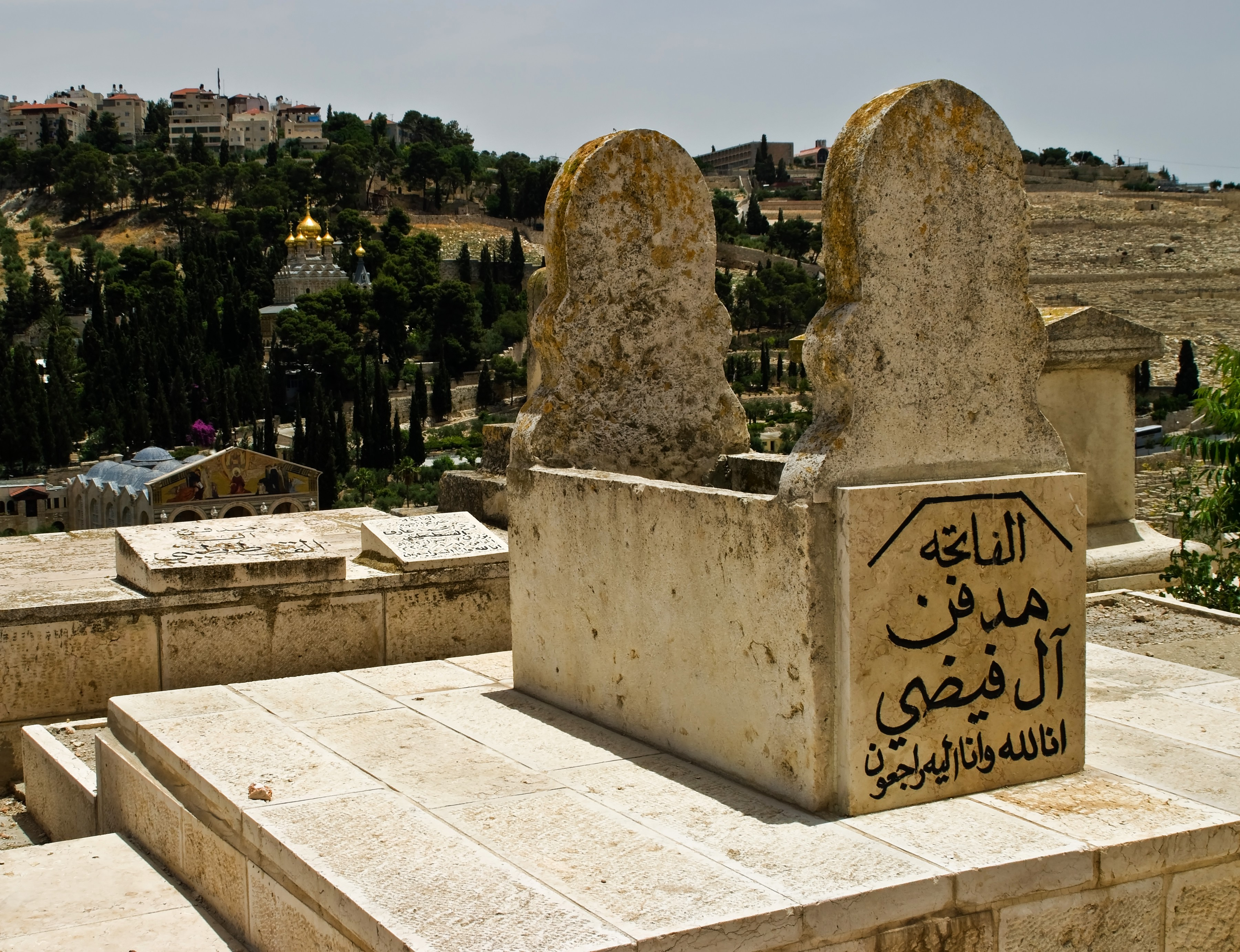
Muslim Cemetery along the Eastern Wall of the Old City of Jerusalem with the phrase written on the tombstone

The Istirjā (Note: Arabic: إِسْتِرْجَاع, pronounced [is.tir.dʒaːʕ], lit. 'recovery') is the name for the Arabic phrase ʾinnā li-llāhi wa-ʾinnā ʾilayhi rājiʿūn (Note: Arabic: إِنَّا لِلَّٰهِ وَإِنَّا إِلَيْهِ رَاجِعُونَ, pronounced [ʔin.naː lil.laː.hi wa.ʔin.naː ʔil.aj.hi raː.dʒi.ʕuːn], lit. 'Indeed, we belong to Allah, and indeed, to Him we will return'), found in the 156th verse of the second chapter of the Quran.. Translating to "To God we belong and to Him we shall return", it reflects the Islamic belief that life and all that exists belong to God, and that every being will ultimately return to Him and serves as a reminder for Muslims to stay patient and seek solace in their faith during the trials as mentioned in the previous verse. (Note: "God tests the people’s belief by giving them either welfare or adversity because he wants to know how they behave in prosperity and in adversity... He imposes hunger, poverty, and the loss of property, lives and crops upon them to test them (q 2:155). Being tried by these afflictions, people should show their belief in God by patient endurance.") It is often recited upon hearing news of death (Note: "To express sadness upon hearing bad news about someone known to the person; reacting to news of somebody’s death, when it is always followed by the qur ānic expression innā li-llāhi wa-innā ilayhi rāji ūn... It also conveys a sense of anger or displeasure in certain contexts.") but also used in response to any form of calamity as a sign of acceptance of divine will and trust in God's wisdom.

It is reported that the Islamic Prophet Muhammad said when a disaster befalls a believer and they recite this phrase, God would grant them something better in return.

The phrase conveys the broader theological principle of human existence being temporary and the afterlife being the ultimate destination.

== See also ==
- Shahada
- Basmala
- Ta'awwudh
- Hawqala
- Be, and it is
- Wa-an laysa lil-insani illa ma sa'a
