= Hadha min fadli Rabbi =

Arabic phrase

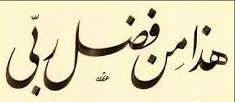
"This is by the Grace of my Lord."

Hadha min fadli Rabbi (Arabic: هَٰذَا مِن فَضْلِ رَبِّي, romanized: hāḏā min faḍli rabbī) is an Arabic phrase whose translation in English nears "This, by the Grace of my Lord," or "This is by the Grace of my Lord." Generally speaking, the phrase is most often used to convey a sense of humility and most importantly, gratitude to God for having something, be it material or spiritual, or otherwise, such as a talent one may possess, or good health, good income, a good spouse, children, etc.

When uttered by someone, it serves as a reminder that all things are from God alone, and thus, this phrase serves as a way to convey that all credit is due unto to him alone. Additionally, it also serves as a way to express gratitude and appreciation of God for the thing possessed, given, or owned by the person. In this sense, the phrase is closely related to another Arabic term, namely, Alhamdulillah, which conveys the idea of "All praise be to God," or even, "Thank God," as it is most often understood by Muslims and non-Muslim Arabs.

Although this phrase is generally observed to be used by Arabs (both Muslim and non-Muslim), non-Arab Muslim operators of the phrase also display its usage, especially those closely familiar with the Qur'an and those that possess a relatively simple and basic understanding of the Arabic language, given that the phrase is extracted from the Qur'an.

== History of the phrase ==
This phrase comes from a verse of the Holy Qur'an in which it forms only a small part of the entire verse. In verse 40 of the 27th chapter (sura) of the Qur'an, An-Naml, or The Ant, a story is related of the Prophet Solomon's interactions with Bilqis, also known as The Queen of Sheba. (See related article Islamic view of Solomon for the background of this story.)

Below is the translation by Abdullah Yusuf Ali of verses 38–42 of the above-mentioned chapter.

[Yusufali 27:38] He said (to his own men): "Ye chiefs! which of you can bring me her throne before they come to me in submission?"

[Yusufali 27:39] Said an 'Ifrit, of the Jinns: "I will bring it to thee before thou rise from thy council: indeed I have full strength for the purpose, and may be trusted."

[Yusufali 27:40] Said one who had knowledge of the Book: "I will bring it to thee within the twinkling of an eye!" Then when (Solomon) saw it placed firmly before him, he said: "This is by the Grace of my Lord! – to test me whether I am grateful or ungrateful! and if any is grateful, truly his gratitude is (a gain) for his own soul; but if any is ungrateful, truly my Lord is Free of all Needs, Supreme in Honour!"

== Use of the phrase in graphics, calligraphy, and products ==
The phrase, hādhā min faḍli Rabbī, has been featured in Islamic art and calligraphy as a phrase of importance and significance to Muslims. It is also featured on small gifts, such as greetings cards and rectangular magnets.

== See also ==
- Alhamdulillah
- Arabic alphabet
- Arabic literature
- List of Arabic phrases
- Islamic view of Solomon
- Islamic art
- The Queen of Sheba
- Islamic calligraphy
- Qur'an
- Wa qul rabbi zidni ilma
- Wa-an laysa lil-insani illa ma sa'a

== Sources ==
- https://web.archive.org/web/20081225002128/http://www.al-islam.org/Quran/
