= Wa-an laysa lil-insani illa ma sa'a =

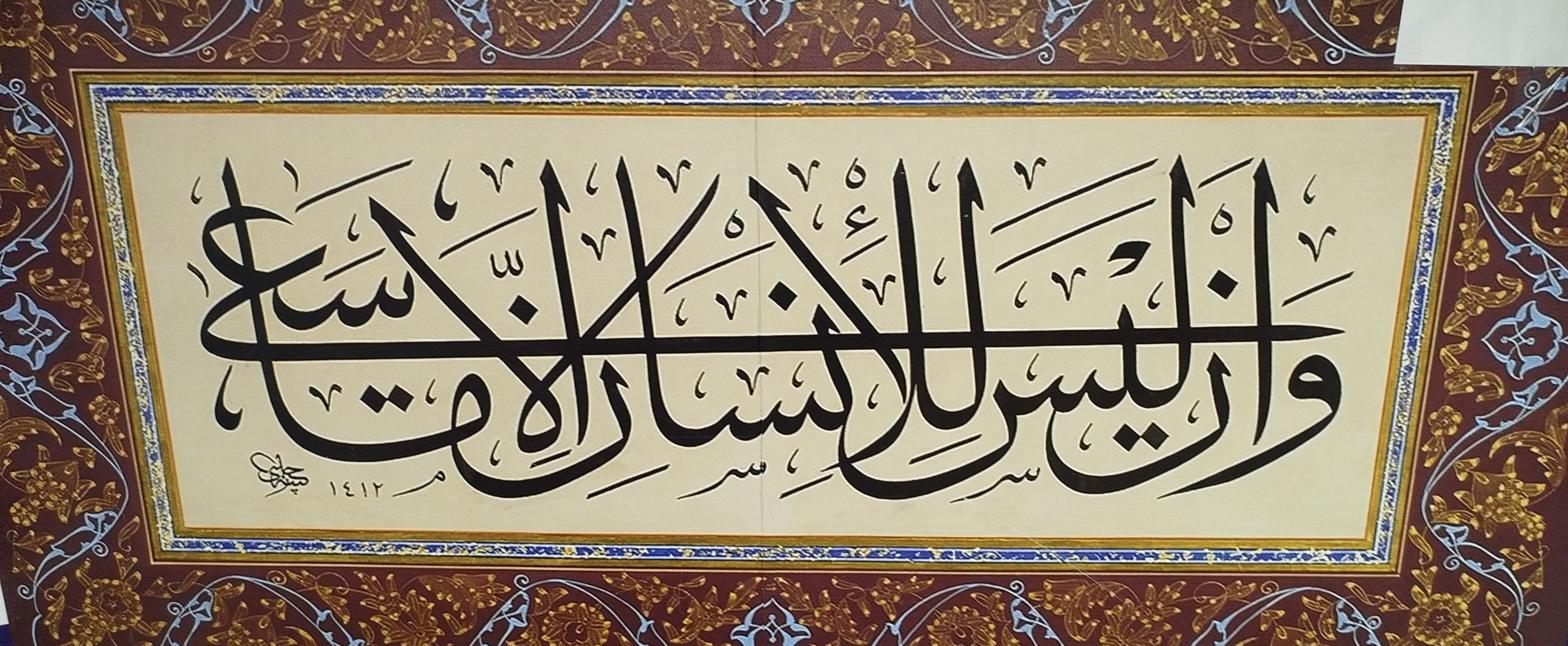
Wa-an laysa lil-insani illa ma sa'a in Arabic calligraphy

Wa-an laysa lil-insani illa ma sa'a (Arabic: وَأَنْ لَيْسَ لِلْإِنْسَانِ إِلَّا مَا سَعَى) is a Quranic verse from Surah An-Najm (53:39). The verse concerns individual responsibility, human effort, and recompense for one's deeds. It occurs within a passage that emphasizes that a person is not held accountable for the deeds of another, and that one's own striving will be seen and recompensed.

== In the Quran ==
The verse occurs in Surah An-Najm in the following passage: The passage begins with the statement that no bearer of burdens bears the burden of another (53:38). This is followed by the statement that a person has only what they strive for (53:39), and then by the verses stating that their striving will be seen and that they will be recompensed for it with the fullest recompense (53:40–41). The verses are therefore presented in the context of individual responsibility for one's actions and the consequences of those actions.

== In Quranic exegesis ==
In Quranic commentary, the term saʿy (سَعْي), meaning striving, endeavor, or effort, has generally been interpreted in relation to a person's deeds and actions. Quranic commentators have also discussed the verse in connection with the question of whether a person may benefit from the deeds of another, particularly in discussions concerning the reward of certain acts performed for or on behalf of the deceased.

== Meaning and interpretation ==
In its immediate context, the verse connects a person with their own striving and deeds. The following verses state that this striving will be seen and that the person will be recompensed for it: The verse does not necessarily imply that every result a person seeks will be attained in worldly life. In its Quranic context, it concerns human effort, individual responsibility, and recompense for one's deeds.

== In Arabic culture ==
This Quranic verse is used in contemporary Arabic discourse as an expression associated with work, effort, perseverance, and personal responsibility. It has also appeared in Arabic calligraphy and in other artistic and cultural contexts.

== See also ==
- Surah An-Najm
- Dhikr
- Islamic ethics
- Basmala
- Hawqala
- Wa qul rabbi zidni ilma
- Hadha min fadli Rabbi
- Inna lillahi wa inna ilayhi raji'un
