= Sahduta =

Creed of Mandaeism

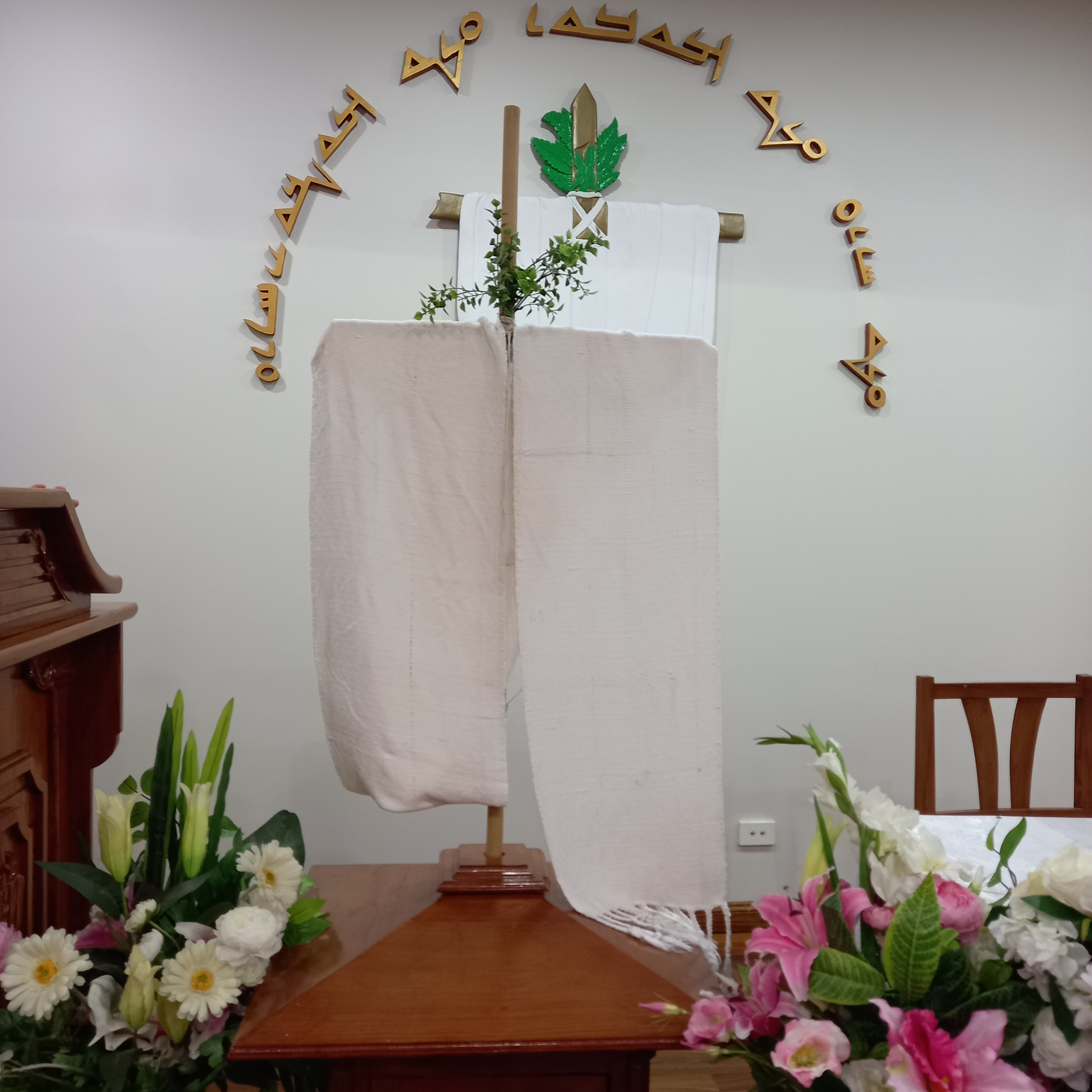
The sahduta (upper center, in golden letters) at Ganzibra Dakhil Mandi in Liverpool, New South Wales, Australia

The sahduta (Classical Mandaic: ࡎࡀࡄࡃࡅࡕࡀ, Modern Mandaic pronunciation: [sahˈduta]) is the creed of Mandaeism. Sahduta (pronunciation: sahdutha) means 'testimony' or 'evidence' in Mandaic (cognate with Hebrew שָׂהֲדוּתָא (sāhdutā) 'testimony') is the fundamental declaration of faith in Mandaeism. It is a testimony affirming the existence of God (Hiia, 'Life'), their lord (Mara(i)), and the knowledge of life (Manda ḏ-Hiia). All three of these titles refer exclusively to Hayyi Rabbi (not to be confused with Manda ḏ-Hayyi, an uthra in Mandaeism, as his name also translates to "knowledge of life").

This statement is used in the preludes of many Mandaean manuscripts. The first part of the daily morning brakha also contains the sahduta.

== Etymology ==
The abstract noun "sahduta" comes from the Semitic triconsonantal root "S-H-D", which means 'to testify', 'bear witness' and 'attest to' according to E. S. Drower and Rudolf Macúch.

The usage of the word sahduta can be found in the Right Ginza, book 1:

"Do not learn the witchcraft (haršia) of Satan and do not bear false witness (u-sahduta ḏ-kadba la-tisahdun). If you are (summoned) to administer justice, keep your judgment straight and do not pervert it. If they call for witnesses, be honest people in giving evidence. Whoever perverts justice will be consumed by the blazing fire (kulman ḏ-apik dina aklalḥ nura ḏ-iaqda)."

== The sahduta ==
The text of the sahduta is as follows.

ࡀࡊࡀ ࡄࡉࡉࡀ ࡀࡊࡀ ࡌࡀࡓࡀࡉ ࡀࡊࡀ ࡌࡀࡍࡃࡀ ࡖࡄࡉࡉࡀ

aka hiia, aka marai, aka manda ḏ-hiia

There is Life, there is my Lord, there is Knowledge of Life.

Mandaic text

ࡀࡊࡀ ࡄࡉࡉࡀ
ࡀࡊࡀ ࡌࡀࡓࡀࡉ
ࡀࡊࡀ ࡌࡀࡍࡃࡀ ࡖࡄࡉࡉࡀ

Mandaic transliteration

aka hiia
aka marai
aka manda ḏ-hiia

English translation

There is Life,
there is my Lord,
there is Knowledge of Life.

Pronunciation (IPA)

ˈæka ˈhejji
ˈæka ˈmɑrej
ˈæka ˈmendɑtˁ ˈhejji

=== Analysis ===
Below are the meanings of each word in the sahduta.

- ࡀࡊࡀ (aka) – there is, there exists
- ࡄࡉࡉࡀ (hiia) – Life, Living One, Hayyi Rabbi
- ࡀࡊࡀ (aka) – there is, there exists
- ࡌࡀࡓࡀࡉ (marai) – the first-person possessive form of mara 'Lord'; marai means 'my Lord'
- ࡀࡊࡀ (aka) – there is, there exists
- ࡌࡀࡍࡃࡀ (manda) – Knowledge, Gnosis
- ࡖࡄࡉࡉࡀ (ḏ-hiia) – The word "Life" with the addition of adu (ࡖ), which is a particle meaning 'of' (or 'the', 'that')

== Comparisons with other religions ==
=== In Judaism ===
The opening lines of the Jewish prayer Shema Yisrael can be read as a creedal statement of strict monotheism: "Hear O Israel, the Lord is our God, the Lord is One" (Hebrew: שמע ישראל אדני אלהינו אדני אחד; transliterated Shema Yisrael Adonai Eloheinu Adonai Echad).

This can be seen as close to the Sahduta, since the Mandaean creed is also in the opening of a longer daily prayer.

=== In Islam ===
The Shahada (Arabic: الشَّهَادَةُ aš-šahādatu; Arabic pronunciation: [aʃʃahaːdatʊ], 'the testimony'), also transliterated as Shahadah, is an Islamic oath and creed, and one of the Five Pillars of Islam and part of the Adhan. It reads: "I bear witness that there is no god but God, and I bear witness that Muhammad is the Messenger of God."

Among Abrahamic religions, the Shahada by its structure and use resembles the Sahduta most closely, as both are brief testimonies of faith affirming divine existence and knowledge.

== See also ==
- Bshuma
