= Bshuma =

Mandaean religious formula

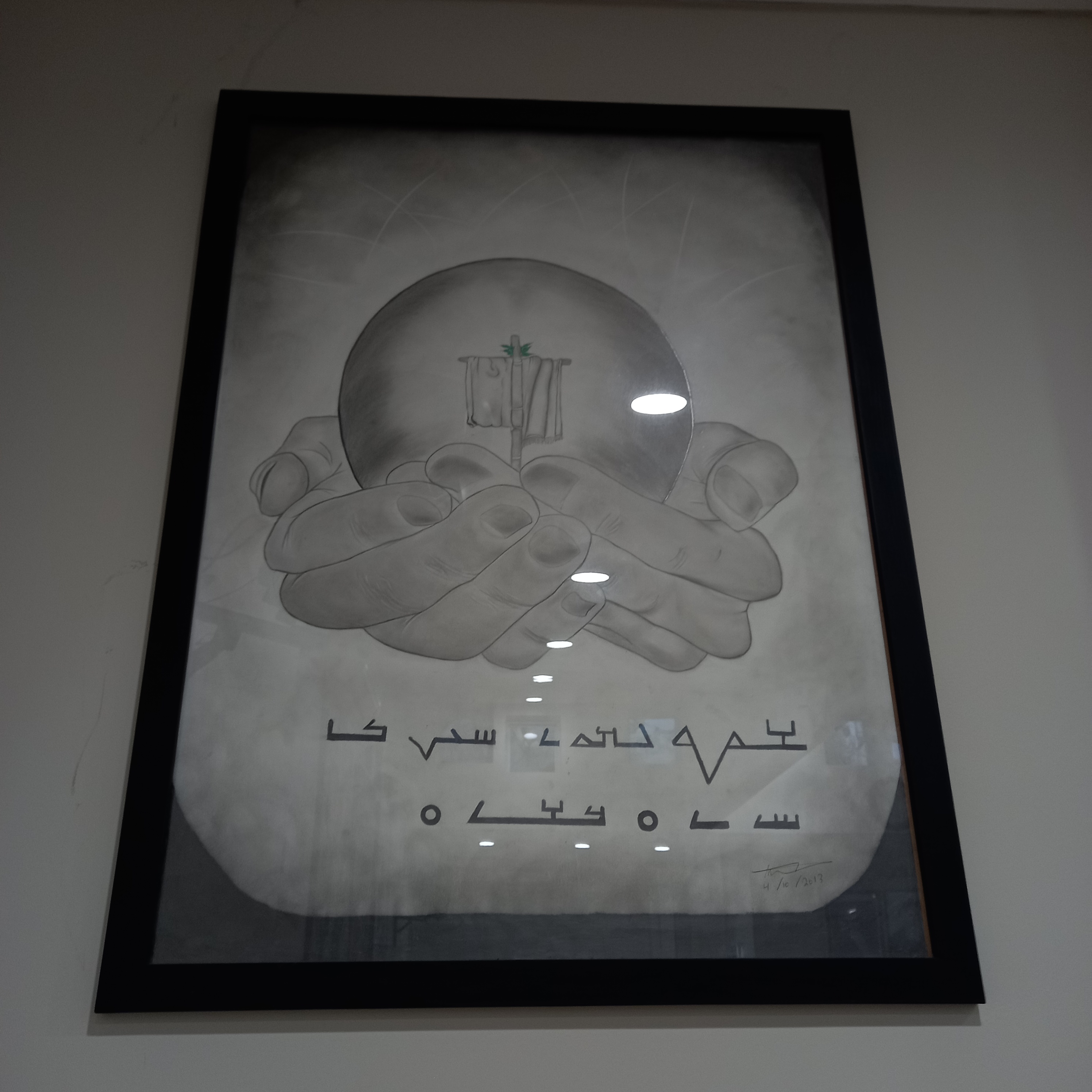
Text of the bshuma

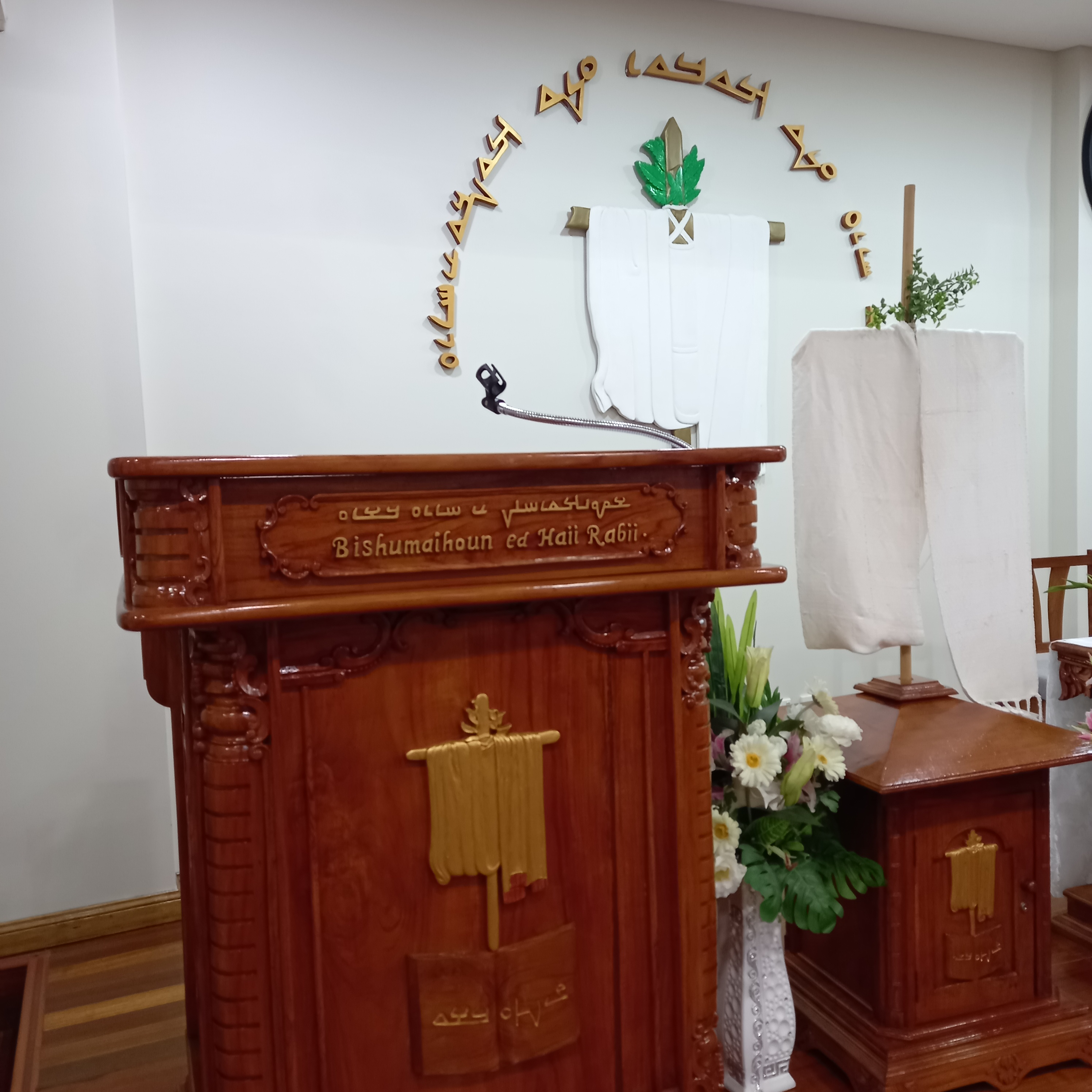
The bshuma as seen on a pulpit at Ganzibra Dakhil Mandi in Liverpool, New South Wales, Australia

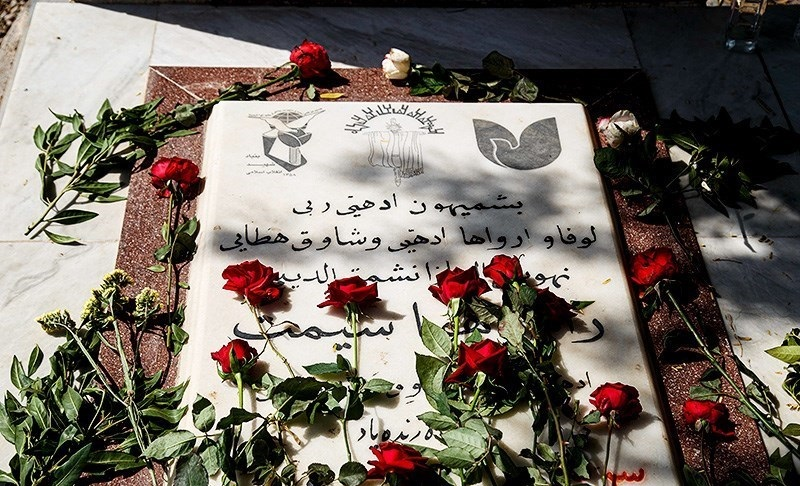
The bshuma written in the Persian alphabet on a Mandaean gravestone in Ahvaz, Iran. On top, the inscription reads بشمیهون اد هیی ربی (b-šumaihun ḏ-hiia rbia). The second line reads: لوفا و ارواها اد هیی (laufa u-ruaha ḏ-hiia; "May laufa (communion) and a renewal of Life") و شاوق هطایی (u-šabiq haṭaiia; "and forgiveness of sins")

In Mandaeism, the bshuma (Classical Mandaic: ࡁࡔࡅࡌࡀ, romanized: b-šuma, lit. 'in the name [of]') is a religious formula that is often written at the beginnings of chapters in Mandaean texts and prayers. The Islamic equivalent is the basmala.

The full form of the bshuma is "In the name of Hayyi Rabbi" (Classical Mandaic: ࡁࡔࡅࡌࡀࡉࡄࡅࡍ ࡖࡄࡉࡉࡀ ࡓࡁࡉࡀ, romanized: b-šumaihun ḏ-hiia rbia, lit. 'In the names of the Great Life'; Modern Mandaic pronunciation: [bɪʃˈmeihon əd ˈhejji ˈrɑbbi]; Arabic: باسم الحي العظيم, bism al-Ḥayy al-ʿAẓīm).

A simpler version is ࡁࡔࡅࡌࡀ ࡖࡄࡉࡉࡀ (b-šuma ḏ-hiia; Modern Mandaic pronunciation: [ˈbɪʃmɑtˁ hejji], or bišmi-ṭ-heyyī), which literally translates to "In the name of Life."

== Related formulas ==
At the ends of Mandaean prayers and texts, the following formulas are often recited to conclude the prayer or text.

- "And Hayyi is victorious" (Classical Mandaic: ࡅࡄࡉࡉࡀ ࡆࡀࡊࡉࡍ, romanized: u-hiia zakin)
- "And praise be to Hayyi" (Classical Mandaic: ࡅࡌࡔࡀࡁࡉࡍ ࡄࡉࡉࡀ, romanized: u-mšabin hiia)

== See also ==
- Basmala
- Berakhah
- Brakha
- Sahduta
