= Wa qul rabbi zidni ilma =

Wa qul rabbi zidni ilma (Arabic: وَقُلْ رَبِّ زِدْنِي عِلْمًا, "And say, 'My Lord, increase me in knowledge'") is a Quranic phrase from Ta-Ha, verse 114. It occurs at the end of the verse, in which Muhammad is instructed not to hasten in reciting the Qur'an before its revelation is completed and to ask God for an increase in knowledge.

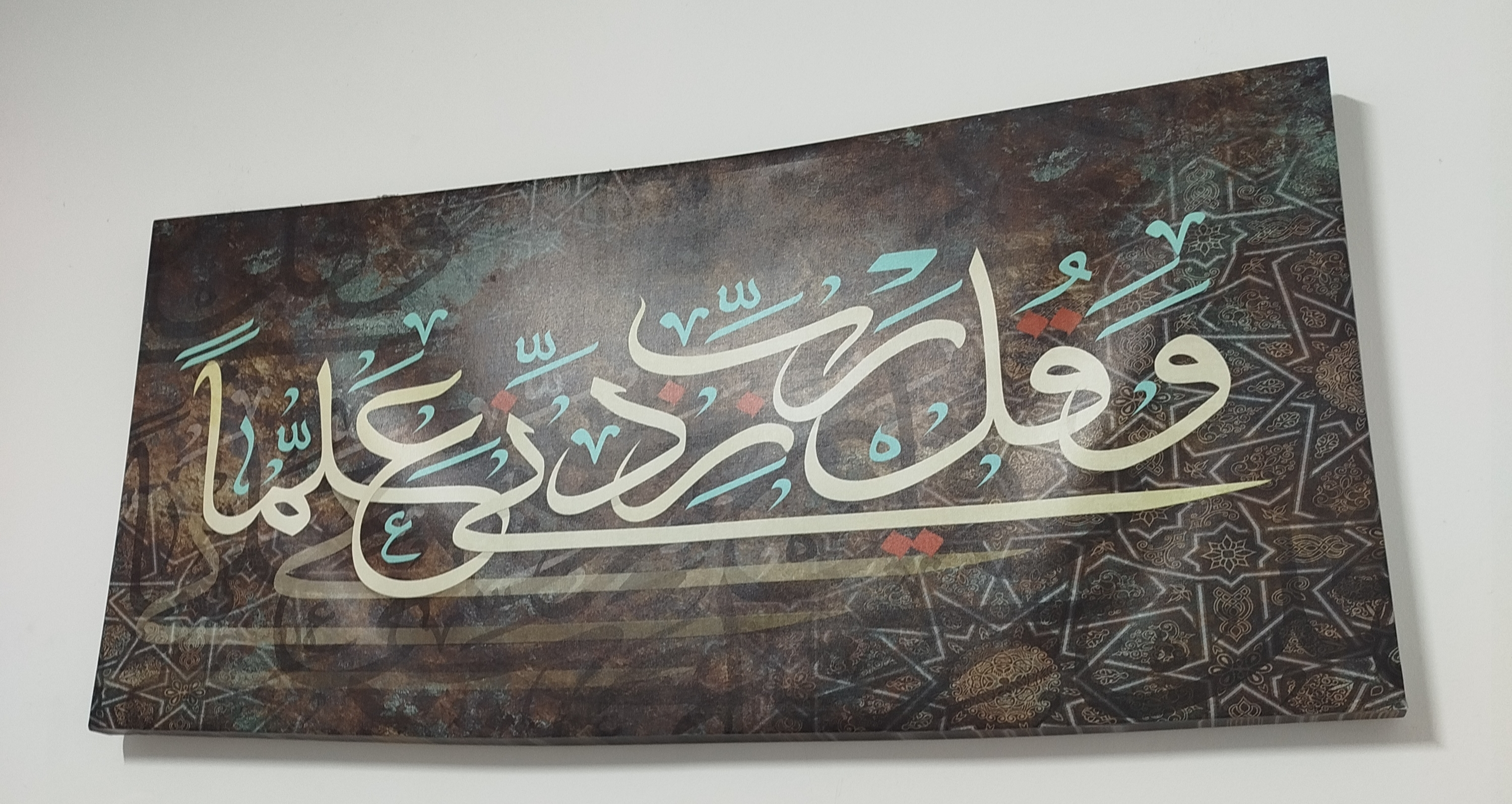
Wa qul rabbi zidni ilma

== In the Quran ==
The phrase appears in Ta-Ha 20:114:

...and say, "My Lord, increase me in knowledge."

— Qur'an 20:114

In its Quranic context, the phrase is a prayer for an increase in knowledge and follows the instruction concerning the reception and recitation of revelation. The phrase has subsequently been cited independently as an expression associated with the pursuit of knowledge and learning.

== Interpretation and cultural use ==
Quranic commentators have discussed the phrase in connection with revelation, knowledge, and learning. In Islamic cultural and educational contexts, it is commonly used as a concise expression of the pursuit of knowledge and continued learning. The phrase also appears in Arabic calligraphy, educational materials, and institutional contexts. It has been incorporated into the emblems or visual identities of some educational institutions, including University of Baghdad in Iraq and University of Damascus in Syria.

== See also ==
- Shahada
- Basmala
- Hawqala
- Quran
- Ta-Ha
- Ilm (Arabic)
- Dua
- Wa-an laysa lil-insani illa ma sa'a
