= Hawqala =

Religious statement in the Arabic language

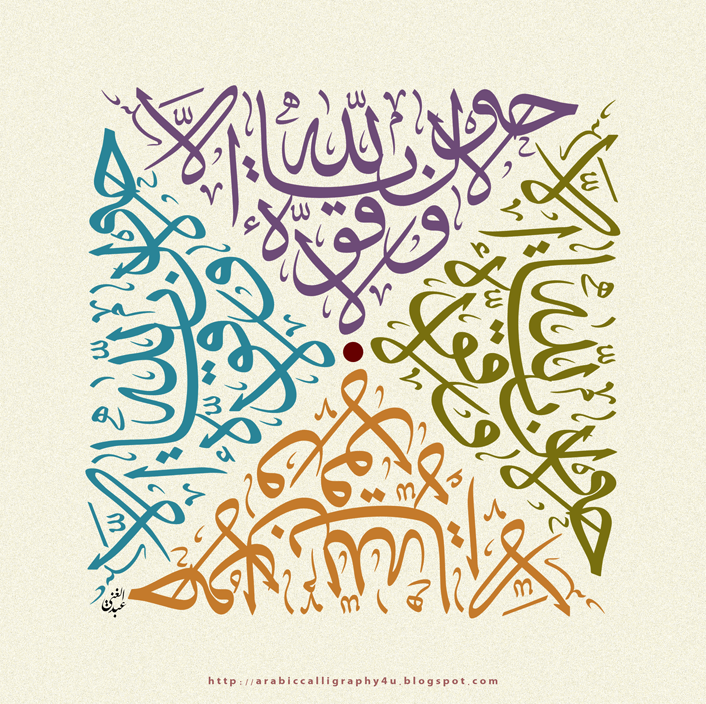
Arabic calligraphy of the Hawqala

The Ḥawla (Arabic: حَوْلَة) or the La Hawla (Arabic: لَا حَوْلَ) is an Arabic term referring to the Arabic statement لَا حَوْلَ وَلَا قُوَّةَ إِلَّا بِٱللَّٰهِ (lā ḥawla wa lā quwwata illā billāh^{i}), which is usually translated as "There is no power nor strength except by God."

The expression Ḥawqala is used by Muslims during times of calamity, oppression, or situations beyond their control, invoking complete reliance on God’s power and strength. It is a form of dhikr (remembrance of God), often recited to seek divine help and affirm that no power or strength exists except through Allah. The word Ḥawqala is a portmanteau (or naḥt) of ḥawl (power) and quwwa (strength).

== See also ==
- Basmala
- Tasbih
- Dhikr
- Wa qul rabbi zidni ilma
- Wa-an laysa lil-insani illa ma sa'a
