= Basmala =

Islamic phrase meaning "In the name of Allah"

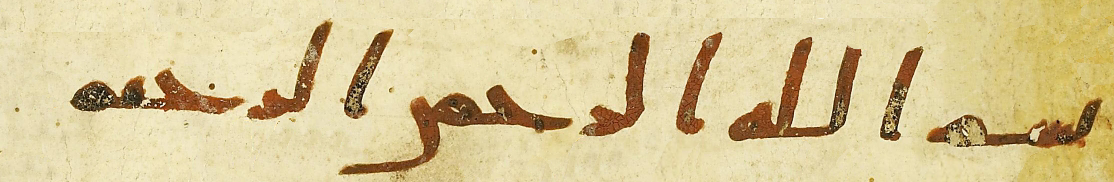
The basmala on the oldest surviving Quran. Rasm: "ٮسم الـله الرحمں الرحىم"

Basmala calligraphy.

A calligraphic rendition of the Basmala.

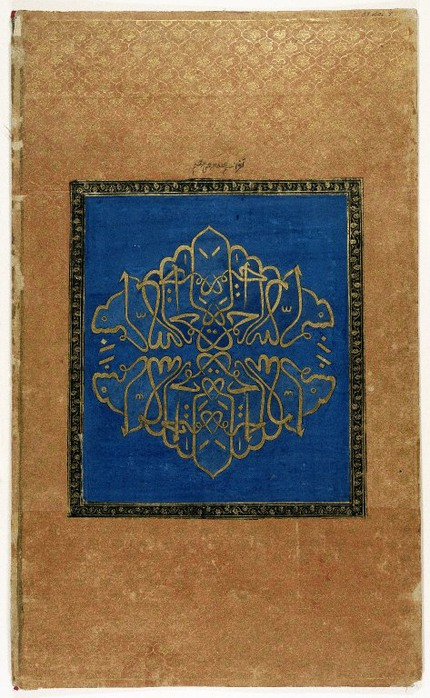
Mughal-era calligraphy.

Common Arabic pronunciation of the Basmala.

The Basmala or Basmalah (Arabic: بَسْمَلَة, romanized: basmalah; also known as Tasmiya by its opening words Bism-illāh; بِسْمِ ٱللهِ, "In the name of God") is an Islamic phrase meaning "In the name of God, the Most Gracious, the Most Merciful" (Arabic: بِسْمِ ٱللهِ ٱلرَّحْمَٰنِ ٱلرَّحِيْمِ, romanized: bi-smi llāhi r-raḥmāni r-raḥīm^{i}). It is one of the most important phrases in Islam and is frequently recited by Muslims before performing daily activities and religious practices, including prayer, and at the start of verses (āyah) or chapters (surahs) of the Qur'an.

In the Quran, it is recited before each chapter (surah), except for the ninth chapter At-Tawbah. (Note: See, however, the discussion of the eighth and ninth surahs at Al-Anfal (the eighth surah).) Scholarly debates regarding its inclusion in the Qur'anic text reached consensus with the 1924 Cairo Edition, where it was included as the first verse (āyah) of Al-Fatiha and remained an unnumbered line preceding each of the 112 other chapters.

Historically, the Islamic Basmala appears to be related to earlier variants of the phrase appearing in Arabian inscriptions dating back to the 5th and 6th centuries.

The Basmala is used in constitutions of over half of the countries where Islam is the state religion or more than half of the population follows Islam, usually the first phrase in the preamble, including those of Afghanistan, Bahrain, Bangladesh, Brunei, Egypt, Iran, Iraq, Kuwait, Libya, Maldives, Pakistan, Saudi Arabia, Tunisia, and the United Arab Emirates.

== Etymology ==
Evolution of writing the basmala (9th - 11th century)

The traditional name for the phrase in Classical Arabic was tasmiyah. Other common phrases in Islam were also given their own names based on form 2 verbal nouns, including the tasbih ("Subhān Allāh").

The word basmala was derived from a slightly unusual procedure, portmanteau: the first four pronounced consonants of the phrase beginning bismi llāhi... were used to create a new quadriliteral root: b-s-m-l (ب-س-م-ل). This quadriliteral root was used to derive the noun basmala and its related verb forms, meaning "to recite the basmala". The method of coining a quadriliteral name from the consonants of multiple words in a phrase is also used to create hamdala for Alhamdulillah, instead of the formal form tahmid. A similar portmanteau is the source of the term for the hawqala. According to French historian Philippe Gignoux, this 'Bismillāh al-Raḥmān al-Raḥīm' actually entered the Quran from the Middle Persian phrase 'pad nām ī yazdān' (Modern Persian: 'به نام یزدان'), meaning 'in the name of God,' and was transformed.

== Use and significance ==
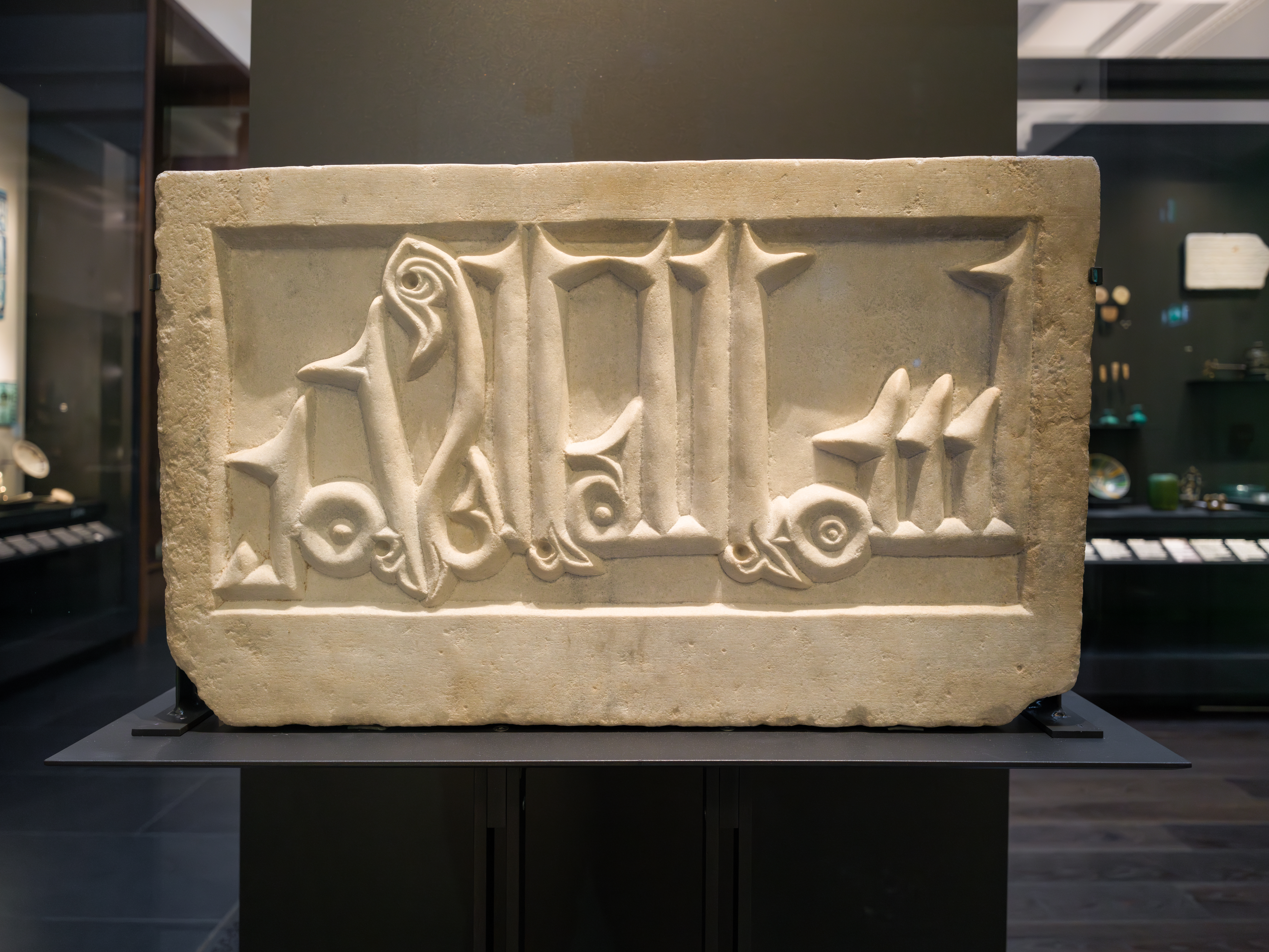
Marble tombstone with carved basmala, Ashmunein, May 967

According to Lane, ar-raḥmān has the more intensive meaning, taken to include as objects of "sympathy" both the believer and the unbeliever, and may therefore be rendered as "the Compassionate"; ar-raḥīm, on the other hand, is taken to include as objects the believer in particular, may be rendered as "the Merciful" (considered as expressive of a constant attribute).

In the Qur'an, the Basmala, is usually numbered as the first verse of the first sura, but, according to the view adopted by Al-Tabari, it precedes the first verse. Apart from the ninth sura ("At-Tawba"), Al-Qurtubi reported that the correct view is that the Basmala ignored at the beginning of At-Tawba because Gabriel did not refer to the Basmala in this surah. Another view says that the Islamic prophet Muhammad died before giving a clarification if At-Tawba is part of Quran 8 (al-ʾanfāl) or not. It occurs at the beginning of each subsequent sura of the Qur'an and is usually not numbered as a verse except at its first appearance at the start of the first sura. The Basmala occurs as part of a sura's text in verse 30 of the 27th sura ("An-Naml"), where it prefaces a letter from Sulayman to Bilqis, the Queen of Sheba.

The Basmala is used extensively in everyday Muslim life, said as the opening of each action in order to receive blessing from God. Reciting the Basmala is a necessary requirement in the preparation of halal food.

In the Indian subcontinent, a Bismillah ceremony is held for a child's initiation into Islam.

The three definite nouns of the Basmala—Allah, ar-Rahman and ar-Rahim—correspond to the first three of the traditional 99 names of God in Islam. Both ar-Rahman and ar-Rahim are from the same triliteral root R-Ḥ-M, "to feel sympathy, or pity".

Around 1980, IRIB used it before starting their newscasts.

=== Hadith ===
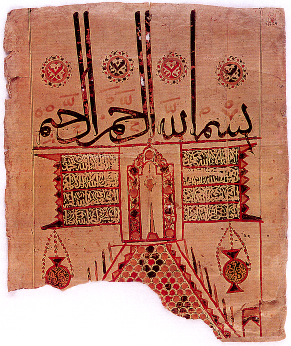
Block printed basmala 1242-1258

Thuluth script

There are several hadiths encouraging Muslims to recite it before eating and drinking. For example:

Jabir reported: I heard Messenger of Allah (saw) saying, "If a person mentions the Name of Allah upon entering his house or eating, Satan says, addressing his followers: 'You will find nowhere to spend the night and no dinner.' But if he enters without mentioning the Name of Allah, Satan says (to his followers); 'You have found (a place) to spend the night in,' and if he does not mention the Name of Allah at the time of eating, Satan says: 'You have found (a place) to spend the night in as well as food.'"

— From Al Bukhari and Muslim

Aisha reported: "The Prophet said, "When any of you wants to eat, he should mention the Name of God in the beginning (Bismillah). If he forgets to do it in the beginning, he should say Bismillah awwalahu wa akhirahu (I begin with the Name of God at the beginning and at the end)".

— From At-Tirmidhi and Abu Dawud

Umaiyyah bin Makshi reported: "The Prophet was sitting while a man was eating food. That man did not mention the Name of God till only a morsel of food was left. When he raised it to his mouth, he said, Bismillah awwalahu wa akhirahu. The Prophet smiled at this and said, "Satan had been eating with him but when he mentioned the Name of God, Satan vomited all that was in his stomach".

— From Abu Dawud and Al-Nasa'i

Wahshi bin Harb reported: "Some of the Sahaba of the Prophet said, 'We eat but are not satisfied.' He said, 'Perhaps you eat separately.' The Sahaba replied in the affirmative. He then said, 'Eat together and mention the Name of God over your food. It will be blessed for you.'

— From Abu Dawood

A tradition ascribed to Muhammad states:

All that is contained in the revealed books is to be found in the Qur’an and all that is contained in the Qur’an is summed up in the surat al-fatihah ("The opening one") while this is in its turn contained in the formula Bismillahi-r-Rahmani-r-Rahim ("In the name of God, the Compassionate, the Merciful").

A tradition ascribed to Imam Ali states:

The basmalah is in essence contained in the first letter, Ba, and this again in its diacritical point, which thus symbolizes principal Unity.

=== Tafsir ===
Basmala calligraphy

In a commentary on the Basmala in his Tafsir al-Tabari, al-Tabari writes:

"The Messenger of Allah (the peace and blessings of Allah be upon him) said that Jesus was handed by his mother Mary over to a school in order that he might be taught. [The teacher] said to him: 'Write "Bism (In the name of)".' And Jesus said to him: 'What is "Bism"?' The teacher said: 'I do not know.' Jesus said: 'The "Ba" is Baha’u'llah (the glory of Allah), the "Sin" is His Sana’ (radiance), and the "Mim" is His Mamlakah (sovereignty)."

== Numerology ==
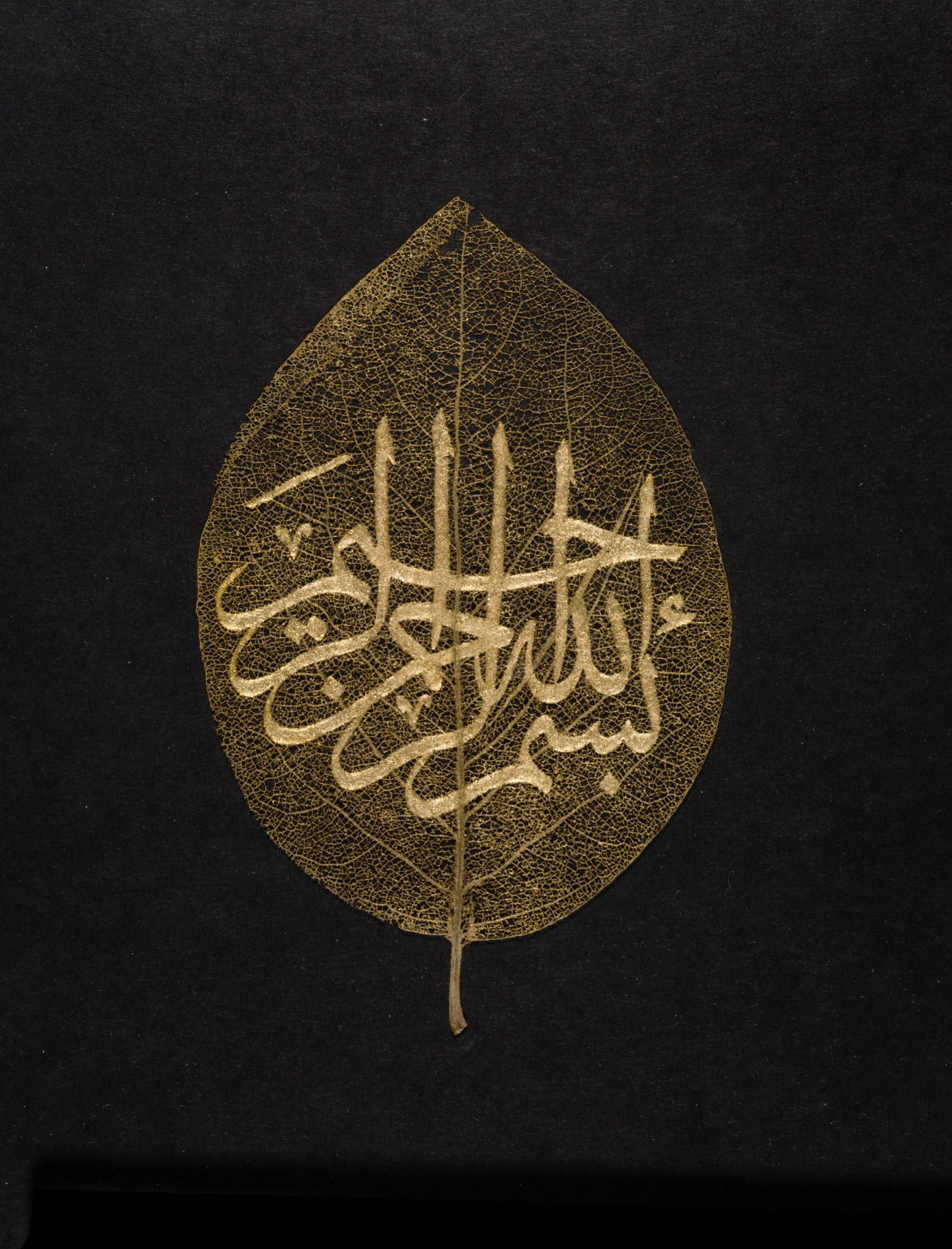
19th century basmala on a leaf

=== Gematria ===
According to the standard Abjadi system of numerology, the total value of the letters of the Islamic Basmala, i.e. the phrase — is 786. This number has therefore acquired a significance in folk Islam and Near Eastern folk magic and also appears in many instances of pop-culture, such as its appearance in the 2006 song '786 All is War' by the band Fun-Da-Mental. A recommendation of reciting the basmala 786 times in sequence is recorded in Al-Buni. Sündermann (2006) reports that a contemporary "spiritual healer" from Syria recommends the recitation of the basmala 786 times over a cup of water, which is then to be ingested as medicine. 786 as a number, however, does not appear in Quran or Hadith.

It has also become common to abbreviate the phrase by typing "786", especially in online communication, and especially among South Asian Muslims. License plates, phone numbers, and serial numbers on currency containing 786 have garnered a particularly high price in South Asia and Dubai. Businesses in Myanmar have displayed 786 to indicate that they are owned by Muslims.

The 19 Arabic letters of the Basmala's tetrad of words (Bism has 3, Allah has 4, al-Rahman has 6, al-Rahim has 6) also align with the numerical culture of the Báb's revelation, whose Badíʿ calendar outlined in the Kitábu'l-Asmáʼ serves as the numerical basis of the Baháʼí calendar consisting of 19 divisions of 19 days each, which can be thematically grouped in alignment with the 3:4:6:6 tetrad pattern.

== Unicode ==
In Unicode, the Basmala is encoded as one ligature at code point U+FDFD ﷽ in the Arabic Presentation Forms-A block.

Unicode
| HTML entity references | Character | Name | Transcription | Arabic | English |
|---|---|---|---|---|---|
| &#65021;&#xFDFD; | ﷽ | Arabic ligature BISMILLAH AR-RAHMAN AR-RAHEEM | Bi-smi llāhi r-raḥmāni r-raḥīm | بسم اللّٰه الرحمن الرحيم | In the name of Allah, the Most Gracious, the Most Merciful |

== Gallery ==
Mirrored basmala calligraphy

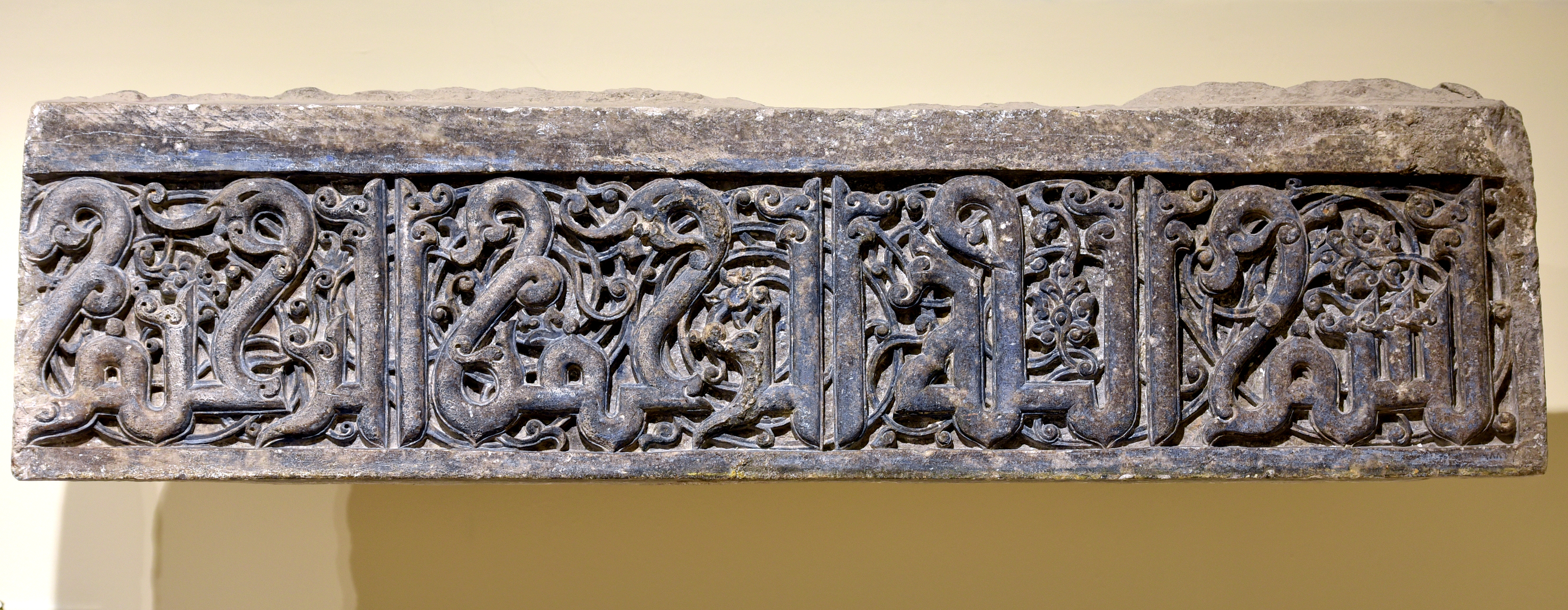
Marble carved Basmala, Great Mosque of al-Nuri, Mosul, 12th century

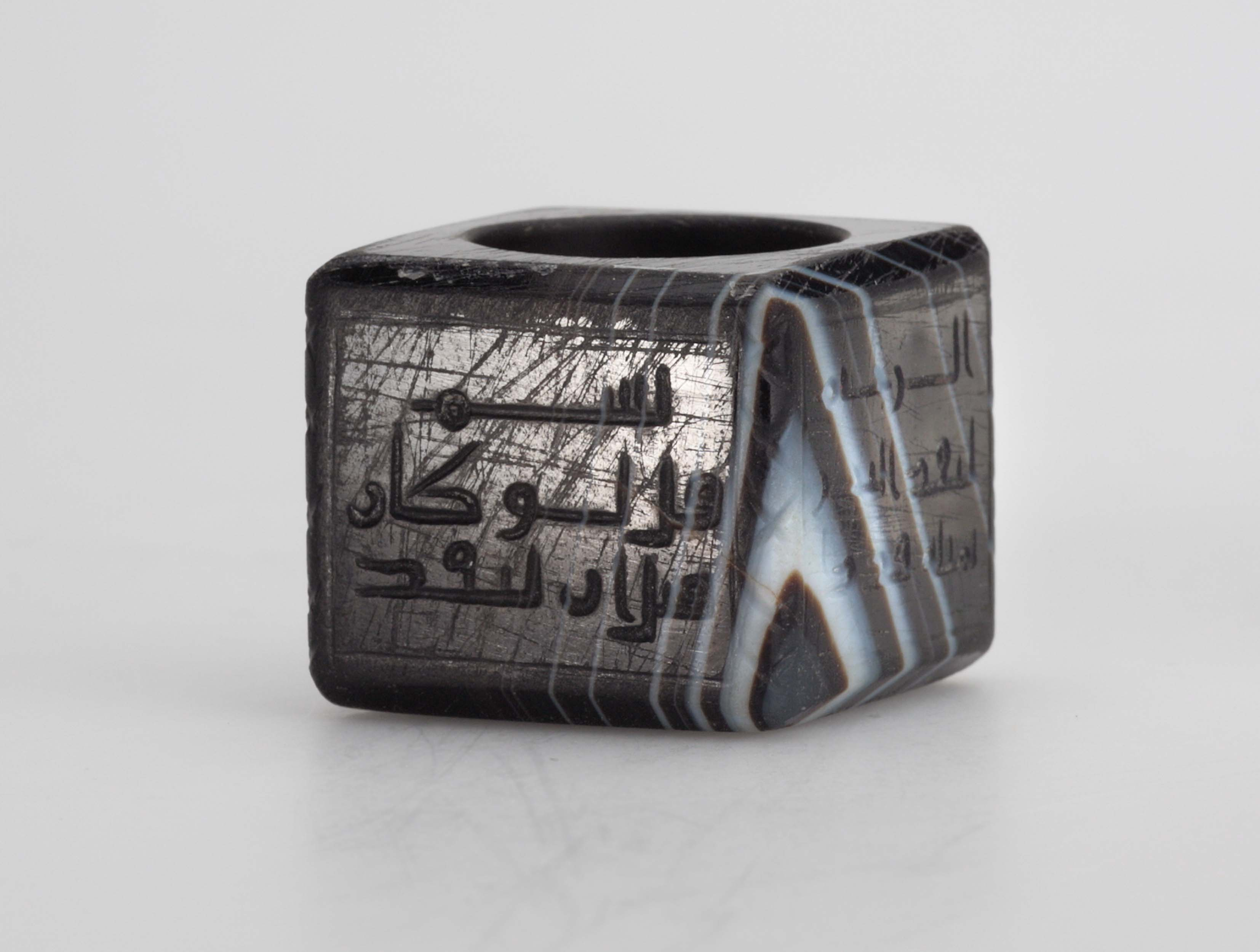
Agate inkpot with basmala, 10th century

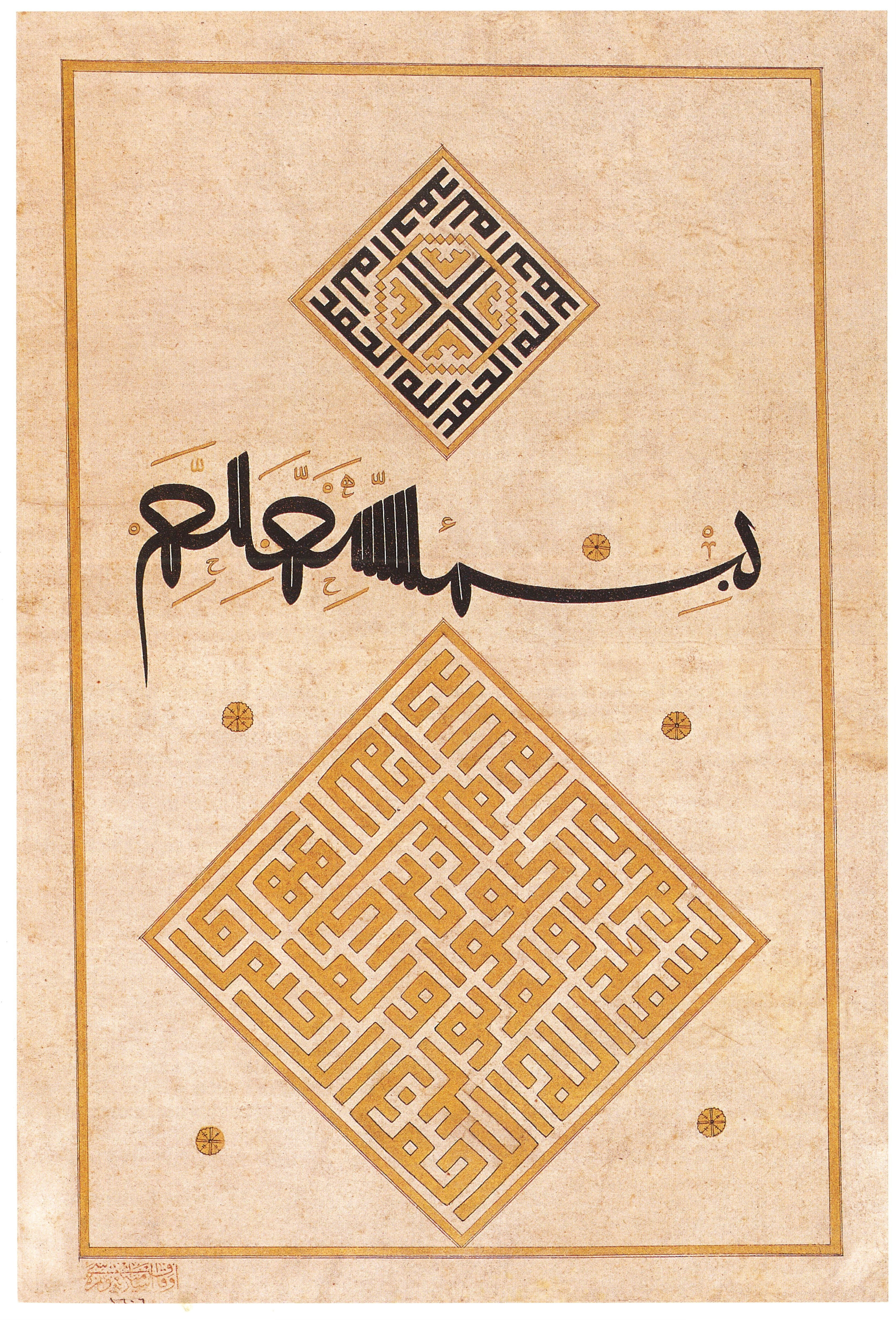
Ahmed Karahisari calligraphy, 1550

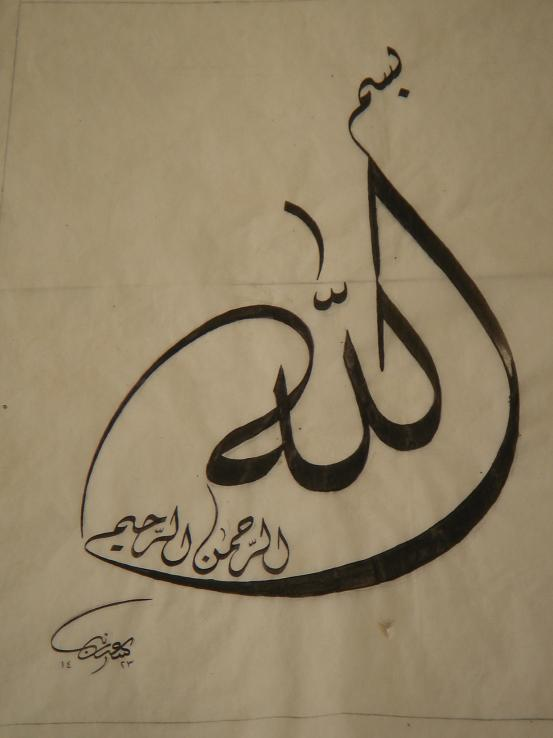
Basmala calligraphy, 2002

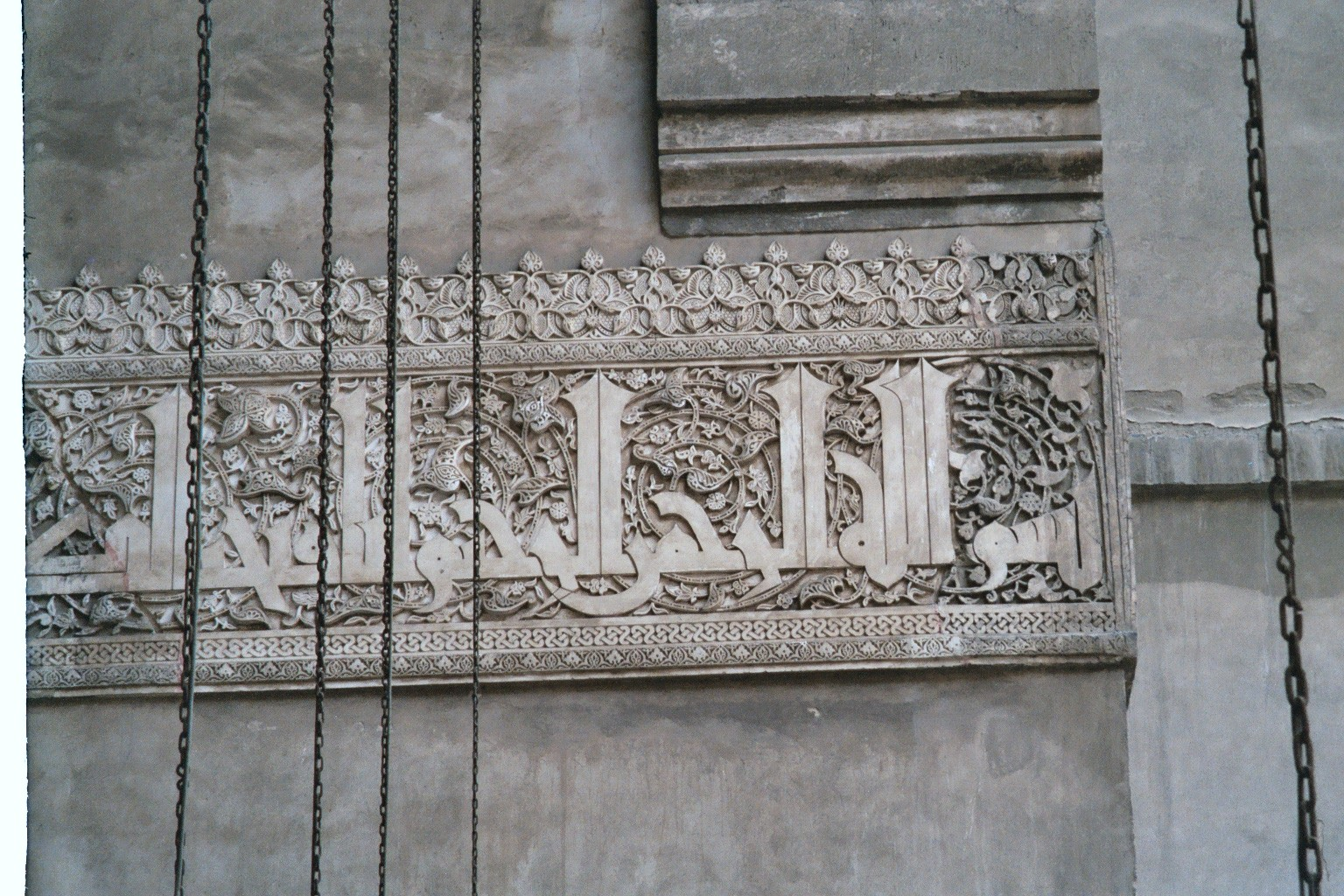
Basmala calligraphy of Mosque-Madrasa of Sultan Hasan's iwan, 1356-1363

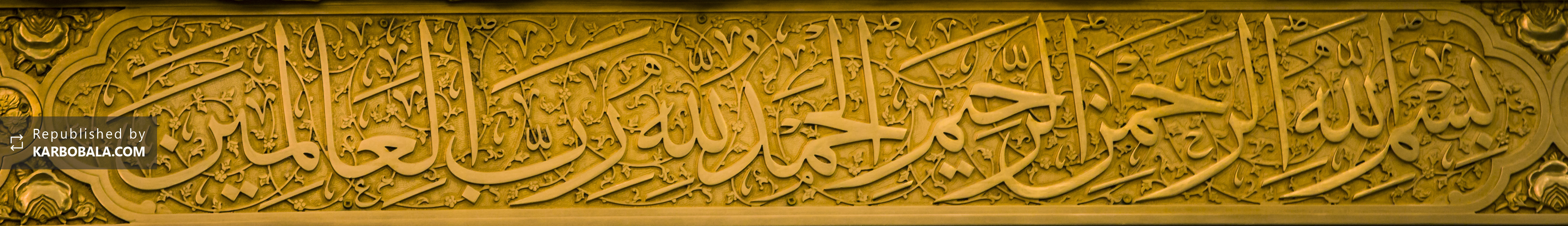
Carved Basmala Calligraphy from Al-Abbas Shrine

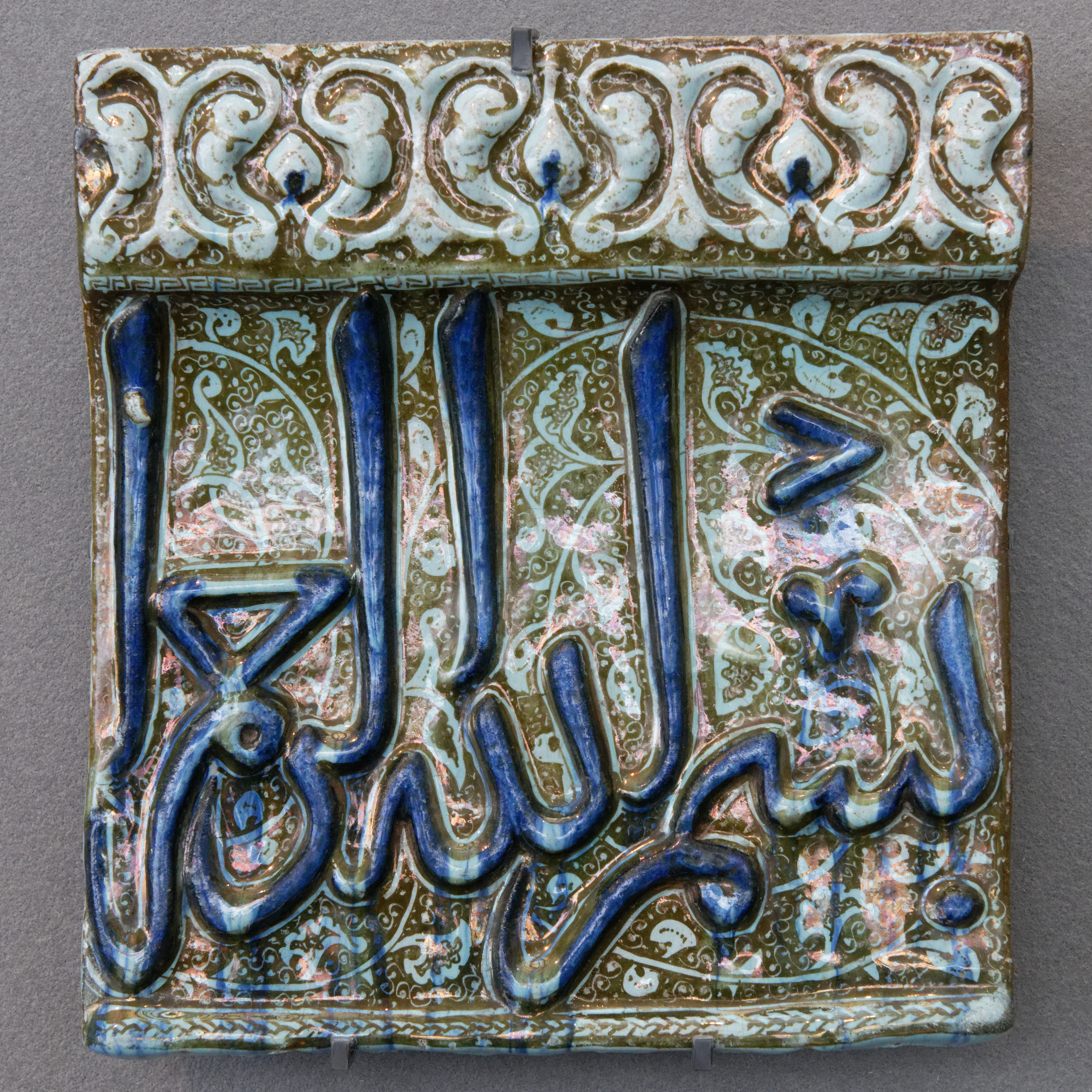
Ilkhanid lustreware tile, 13th century

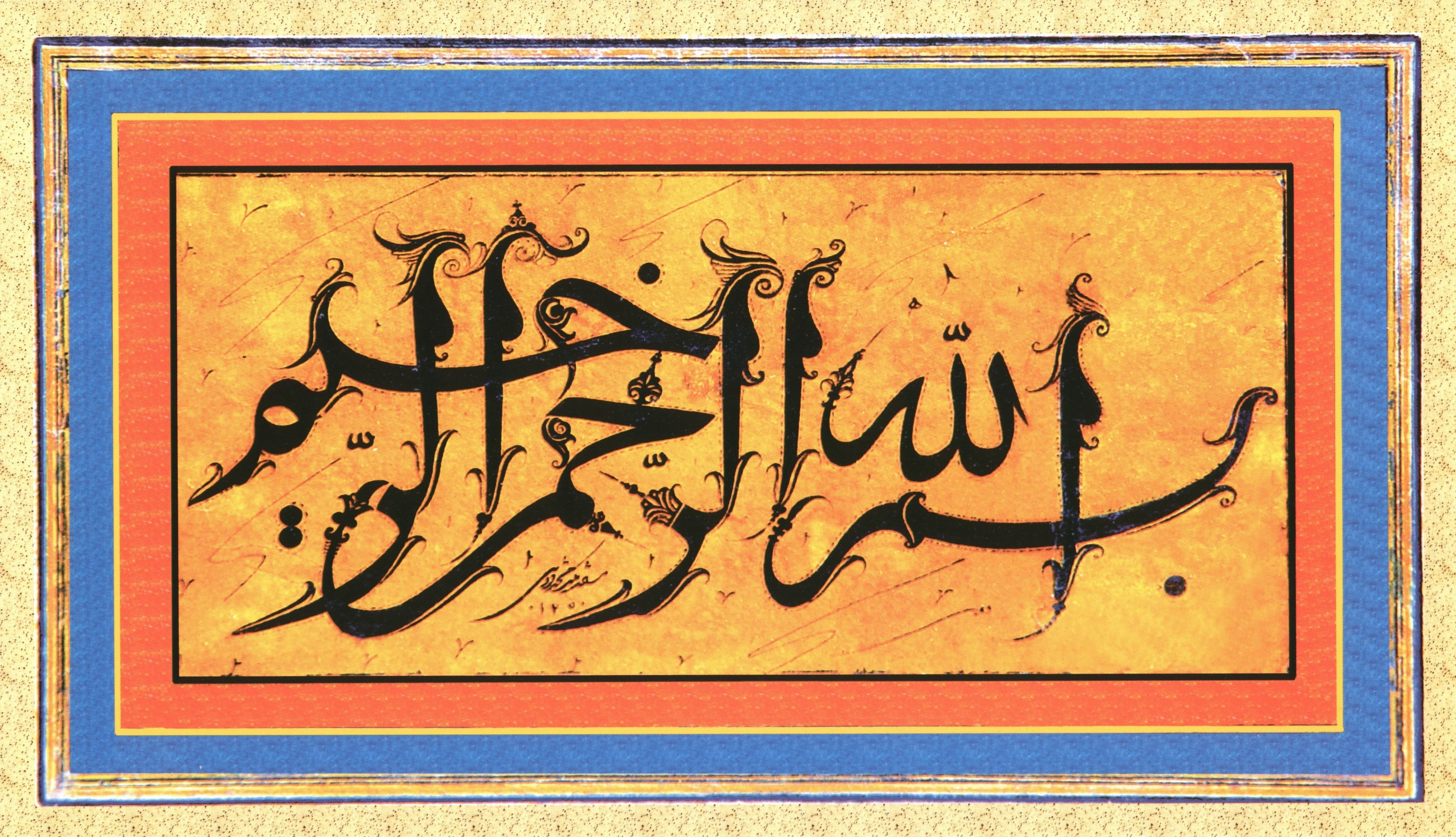
Calligraphy of Malik Muhammad Qazvini, Qajar Iran, 1835

Looping Basmala calligraphy

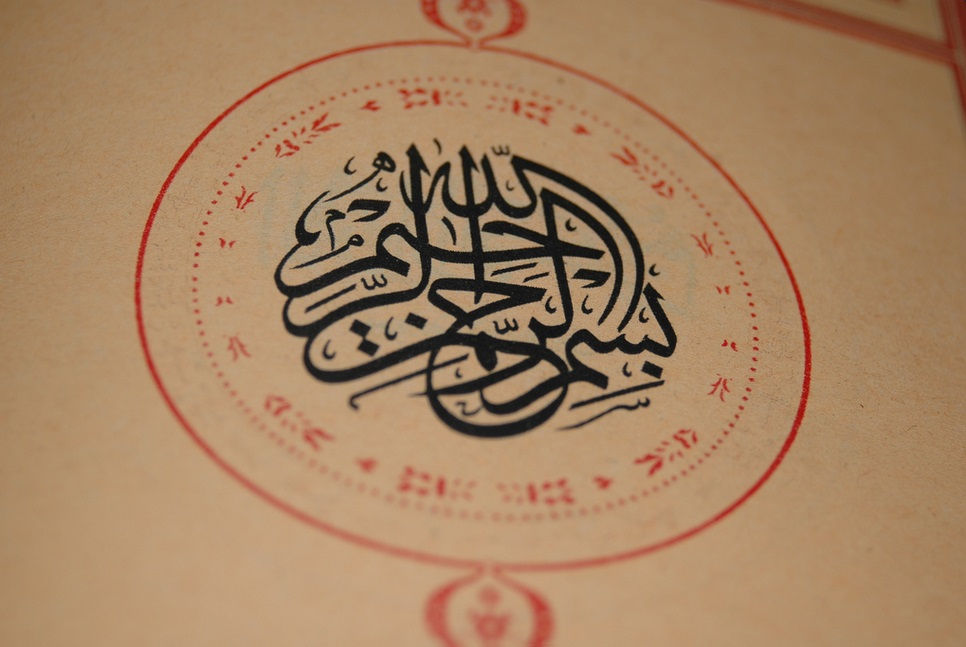
Basmala calligraphy stamp

Basmala calligraphy flanked by al-Rahman and a mirrored al-Raheem.

Knotted Kufic Basmala calligraphy

Triangular Basmala calligraphy

Basmala calligraphy

== See also ==
- Besiyata Dishmaya
- Bshuma in Mandaeism
- Glossary of Islam
- Inshallah
- Shahada
- List of Christian terms in Arabic
- Wa qul rabbi zidni ilma

== Sources ==
- Carra de Vaux, Bernard; Gardet, Louis (1960–2007). "Basmala". In Bearman, P.; Bianquis, Th.; Bosworth, C.E.; van Donzel, E.; Heinrichs, W.P. (eds.). Encyclopaedia of Islam, Second Edition. doi:10.1163/1573-3912_islam_COM_0102.
- Graham, William A. (2010). "Basmala". In Fleet, Kate; Krämer, Gudrun; Matringe, Denis; Nawas, John; Rowson, Everett (eds.). Encyclopaedia of Islam, Three. doi:10.1163/1573-3912_ei3_COM_23497.
