= Muhammed al-Ahari =

American essayist, historian, and writer on Islam in America

Muhammed Abdullah al-Ahari
- Born: Ray Allen Rudder; January 6, 1965 (age 61)
- Occupations: Historian, teacher, essayist

Muhammed Abdullah al-Ahari (born January 6, 1965, as Ray Allen Rudder) is an American essayist, historian, teacher, and writer on the topics of American Islam, Black Nationalist groups, heterodox Islamic groups, Bosniaks, and modern occultism. He has also taught at the Islamic Foundation School in Villa Park, Illinois.

== Education ==
Al-Ahari attended both Charleston Southern University and Northeastern Illinois University. He then studied at the American Islamic College for three years. He observed the Sufi Orders of Bektashi, Naqshbandi, Mouride, Tijaniyyah, the Chishti, and Ni'matullāhī. These studies and his travels to mosques and Islamic schools around the country led al-Ahari to focus on the preservation of rare pieces of American Islamic literature and the documentation of the presence of Muslims in the United States and Canada. He briefly moved back to his home state of South Carolina before returning to Chicago in 1990. He attended the American Islamic College for an additional two years.

== Writing career ==
Al-Ahari began writing about the history of Islam in the United States in the 1980s and published several articles with the journals Minaret and Meditations. With Magribine Press, he then published a catalogue of Arabic Slave Narratives written in the United States. Upon his move to Chicago in 1990, he published edited editions of Muhammed Alexander Rusell Webb's Islam in America (1993) and Shaykh Daoud's al-Islam, the True Faith of Humanity (2003). He attended the first Alevi-Bektashi Conference in Isparta, Turkey in 2005, where he presented a paper on the links between the Freemasons and the Bektashi community. He has reprinted over 20 texts of early American Muslim works with his own edits and annotations. He also sometimes translates.

Al-Ahari's writing has been included in anthologies such as Islam Outside the Arab World (1999). His works have also been quoted in (Dis)forming the American Canon: African-Arabic slave narratives (1993) and African Muslims in Antebellum America: Transatlantic Stories and Spiritual Struggles (1997). His work has also appeared in magazines and journals such as Message, Islamsko Misao, Islamic Horizons, Indian Times, Fountain, al-Basheer, New Era, Muslim Journal, Amexem Times and Seasons, and Svijest, among others. He has been an editor for Moorish Science Monitor, The Islamic Cultural Center-Greater Chicago Newsletter, and Meditations. His original writings have been translated into Arabic, Bosnian, Albanian, and Turkish.

Within the Bosnian community, al-Ahari has worked as the principal of an Islamic weekend school, a librarian, a museum director, and an editor of the community newsletter, and has contributed to an edited volume of articles on the history of Bosnians in Canada and the United States. Ten of his articles appear in A Hundred Years of Bosnians in America (2006).

== Personal life ==
One issue of Svijest has a two-page interview with al-Ahari and documents his conversion to Islam and his work on the history of Islam in America.

== Selected works ==
Al-Ahari's annotated and edited reprints of early American Muslim texts have been used in Muslim book clubs and as supplementary texts and textbooks in several university-level classes on Islam in America. Al-Ahari's archives are housed at DePaul University.

- Anthologies and Collections
  - 2006: Five Classic Muslim Slave Narratives, Magribine Press. This is a collection of five out-of-print or rare slave narratives.
  - 2006: A Heritage of East and West: the writings of Shaykh Kamil Yusuf Avdich, Magribine Press. Foreword by al-Ahari. This is a collection of 37 of Imam Kamil Avdić's English-language articles.
  - 2006: The Islam Papers: The 1893 World Parliament of Religion, Magribine Press. This is a collection of ten speeches on Islam given at this event.
  - 2006: Taking Islam to the Street: The Da'wah of the Islamic Party of North America, Magribine Press. This is an annotated edition of five pamphlets published by the Islam Party of North America.
  - 2006: Islam in America and Other Writings of Muhammed Alexander Rusell Webb, Magribine Press. Foreword by al-Ahari. This is a collection of three pamphlets and two speeches from Webb.
  - 2011: Islam, the True Faith, the Religion of Humanity, Magribine Press. A collection of Shaykh Daoud's writing.
- Articles
  - 1992: "Muhammad Alexander Rusell Webb." The Minaret, 51–2.
  - 2006: "A Hundred Years of Bosnians in America" with Senad Agic. Bosnian American Cultural Association.
- Books
  - 1992: African Muslim in Antebellum America and Their Education Theories, Magribine Press
  - 2006: Painting Coal Gold, Magribine Press.
  - 2011: The Osmanli Diaspora & the Development of an Ethnic Press, Magribine Press.
  - 2012: The Outline of Islam with Imam Adnan Balihodzic and Shaykh Kamil Avdich, Islamic Cultural Center of Greater Chicago.
- Edited and annotated works
  - 2005: 100 Seeds of Beirut — The Neglected Poetic Utterances of Warren Tartaglia (Walid al-Taha)
  - 2010: The Black Man, the Father of the Civilization: and other Biblical Commentary by Rev. James Morris Web, Magribine Press.
  - 2011: The Voice of Islam and the Moslem World, Magribine Press. This was an annotated edition of Muhammed Alexander Rusell Webb's newspaper from 1894 to 1895.
- Translations
  - 1993: Bilali Muhammad: Muslim Juriprudist in Antebellum Georgia, Magribine Press. ISBN 0-415-91270-9
  - 2006: The Bektashi Pages, trans. with Naim Frasheri and Huseyin Abiva. Babagan Press. The foreword in the translation from the Albanian-language original was written by al-Ahari.
  - 2012: Bilali Muhammad: Muslim Juriprudist in Antebellum Georgia expanded and illustrated edition with Arabic text, Magribine Press.
