= Sufi studies =

Branch of Islamic comparative studies

Sufi studies is a particular branch of comparative studies that uses the technical lexicon of the Islamic mystics, the Sufis, to exemplify the nature of its ideas; hence the frequent reference to Sufi Orders. It may be divided into two main branches, the orientalist/academic and the spiritual.

== Early Sufi studies in France ==
The earliest Europeans to study Sufism were French, associated (rightly or wrongly) with the Quietist movement. They were Barthélemy d'Herbelot de Molainville (1625–1695), a professor at the Collège de France who worked from texts available in Europe, François Bernier (1625–1688), the physician of the Mughal emperor Aurangzeb who spent 1655–69 in the Islamic world (mostly with Aurangzeb), and François Pétis de la Croix (1653–1713), a diplomat who spent 1674–1676 in Isfahan, where he studied Rumi's Masnavi-ye Manavi and visited the Bektashi order.

D'Herbelot's great work, the Bibliothèque orientale (published posthumously in 1697), included an entry on Sufism (as tasawwuf) and detailed entries on Al-Hallaj, Najmeddin Kubra, and Abd-al-karim Jili. There were a number of references to the Masnavi and to Rumi (as Gellaledin Mohammed al Balkhi), and there may also have been entries on them.

Bernier published an article on Sufism entitled "Mémoire sur le quïetisme des Indes" in the periodical Histoire des Ouvrages des Savans in September 1688. Following this article, there is said to have developed in France a view that the French expression of the creed of Pure Love (Pur Amour/Quietism) was in fact a disguised form of Islam. The debate over Quietism between the bishops Fénelon and Bossuet was remembered as the "Querelle du Pur Amour". Many Quietists (including Jeanne Marie Bouvier de la Motte Guyon) were imprisoned. Others exercised caution and self-censorship.

Pétis de la Croix did not publish himself, but his son (writing later under a pseudonym) gave reasons why he thought "the Mevlevi are perfect Quïetists" (Ahmed Frangui, Lettres critiques de Hadgi Effendi à la Marquise de G... au sujet des mémoires de M. le Chevalier d'Arvieux, Paris, 1735).

D'Herbelot de Molainville's Bibliothèque orientale went through several editions, one of the last of which was the 1777 edition printed in the Hague. It has been suggested that some entries on Sufi topics that were present in the 1697 edition were absent from the 1777 edition. The word "Sufi" appears (vol 3, p. 329).

== Early translations ==
In 1671, Edward Pococke (1648–1727), the son of Oxford professor Edward Pococke (1604–1691), published a Latin translation of the Hayy Ibn Yakhthan of Ibn Tufayl. This led to a number of other translations, including the English translations of 1674 (by George Keith) and 1686 (by George Ashwell), and a Dutch translation of 1701. The anonymous Dutch translator, "S.D.B.", gave a concise biographical review of the philosophers related to the text: Al Farabi, Avicenna, Al Ghazali, Ibn Bajjah, Ibn Rushd, Junayd, and Mansur Al-Hallaj (with a description of his death and a reference to his famous "Ana al-Haqq"). Hayy Ibn Yakhthan may have partly inspired Robinson Crusoe.

In 1812, Joseph von Hammer-Purgstall published a translation of the divan of Hafiz, which was received with delight by Goethe, who was inspired by it to publish in 1819 his Westöstlicher Diwan. A Sufi appears in Gotthold Ephraim Lessing’s play Nathan der Weise, first produced in 1779, though it is not clear from where Lessing learned of Sufism, perhaps through his association with Johann Jakob Reiske.

In 1821, F.A.G. Thölluck published Ssufismus sive Theosophia persarum pantheistica in Berlin (in Latin).

== Early sociological studies ==
One of the earliest sociological treatments of Sufism is to be found in Sir John Malcolm's 1825 work, The History of Persia, From the Most Early Period to the Present Time, Containing an Account of the Religion, Government, Usages and Character of the Inhabitants of that Kingdom. Malcolm's treatment, though interesting, is not well informed.

In An Account of the Manners and Customs of the Modern Egyptians written in Egypt during the years 1833-1835 (1836) Edward William Lane noted, and illustrated with his own woodcuts, his close observations of the Rifa'i derwishes while living in Cairo "in disguise". The success of his work also introduced the success of the "disguise". Sir Richard Burton's Personal Narrative of a Pilgrimage to El-Medinah and Meccah (3 vol.1855-1856) was undertaken while travelling as a Qadiri, and Armin Vambéry reached Baveddin near Bokhara to visit the shrine of Baha-ud-Din Naqshband Bukhari in 1863 in the guise of a murid. Voyage dans l'Asie Centrale, de Téhéran a Khiva, Bokhara et Samarkand, par Arminius Vambéry, savant Hongrois déguisé en derviche was the subject of four instalments of the popular and copiously illustrated "Le Tour Du Monde, Nouveau Journal Des Voyages (Édouard Charton)" Paris, Londres, Leipzig 1865, deuxième semestre -Hachette et Cie ed.

The "disguise" was by no means superficial and necessitated a variety of resources in linguistics and social integration that left marks far beyond the mere popular success of travelogues.

Towards the end of the 19th century, the resistance to the European conquest of North Africa was often led by Sufis, notably Abd al-Qadir and later the Sanusi order. This drew further attention to Sufis and Sufism, and a number of studies were performed and published. These generally suffered from their authors' preoccupations with security.

== Aguéli to Guénon ==
One line of 20th century Sufi studies that came to fruition in the West appears to have been born from many colors in a painters workshop. It was the Swedish painter Ivan Aguéli who – inspired by the quasi occult tradition (Symbolist painters, Les Nabis) developing en marge of the great workshops of Paul Gauguin and Émile Bernard – took his intellectual search into the realm of Sufism proper. This culminated into his initiation, in Egypt, by Sheikh Rahman Elish Kabir into the Shadhili tariqa.

When he returned to Paris from his travels in the East in 1909, he found a mind receptive to his own spiritual affiliation in the person of René Guénon whom in turn he initiated into the Shadhili Order (1912).René Guénon – who finally settled in Cairo where he died (1951) a convert to Islam under his adopted name of Abdel Wahid Yahia – had an enormous influence on a circle of friends centered around the periodical "La Gnose", that he had started in 1909. This circle pooled the resources of a.o. Frithjof Schuon, Titus Burckhardt, Marco Pallis, Ananda Coomaraswamy, Martin Lings e.a., each with his own focus on Islam, Buddhism, Hinduism ... (see also: Gershom Scholem on Judaism, Kabbalah)

René Guénon focused on a measure of criticism towards what he called "solidified" (petrified) forms of initiation in the West; Freemasonry in particular which he sought to revive in reference to Emir Abd Al-Qadir whose name was widely respected among Masons.

If one looks at the aspect of Sufi initiation proper the following background to René Guénon's brand of "Perennial Tradition" emerges. Through his affiliation with the Shadhili Order he was branched to the Akbari chain, going back to the "Greatest Sheikh" – Shaykh Al-Akbar – Ibn Arabi.

Seminal research on the inspiration of Ibn Arabi and the Shadili and its projection in the works of Dante and St John of the Cross came from the great Christian scholar Miguel Asín Palacios

== Abd Al-Qadir and al-Tijani ==
The Akbari already had a history of initiation in Western Europe in the person of Emir Abd Al-Qadir, the noble opponent of the French in their colonial struggle over Algeria, who they had held sequestered at the Château d'Amboise (1848–1853). In 1858 the Imprimerie Nationale (Paris) had printed his "Rappel à l'Intelligent; avis à l'Ignorant", an essay he had sent to the Société Asiatique in 1855.

The Emir Abd Al-Qadir had been initiated into the Naqshbandi by Sheikh Diya al-Din Khalid Al-Sharazuri and into the Qadiri by his own father Sidi Muhiuddin who led a North African branch of the Qadiri Order. In 1863, during his Hajj, he met with Muhammed al-Fasi al-Shadili, who became his last living teacher, in Mekka. Muhammad al-Fasi al-Shadili's proper teacher had been initiated into the Shadhili by al-Arabi ad-Darqawi, some of whose letters were translated by Martin Lings (1961); they form the background to Martin Lings' outline of the autobiographical writings of Ahmad al-Alawi, who was linked to the Shadhili through ad-Darqawi. Sheikh Ahmad al-Alawi died in 1932.

An approach from a different angle may be traced to Sheikh Ahmad al-Tijani who died in Fez in 1815 and was said to be the inheritor of the "paths" of his time, a.o. Qadiri and Shadili.

Sheikh Hammalah ben Mohammed ben Sidna Omar, who died in forced exile to France, lies buried in Montluçon, France. He was the former Qutub al Zaman of the Tijaniyyah. A moving account of the circumstances of his death is given by the great African traditionalist and cultural ambassador Amadou Hampâté Bâ, himself a Tijani, in the biography of his own sheikh, Tierno Bokar.

== Massignon to Nasr ==
Thus the current into which the friends of the Traditionalist School had tapped proved to be a lively one. René Guénon's wish to edit a series of Sufi translations was frustrated, but in the meantime Louis Massignon had prepared himself for the task. By 1922, his introduction to the technical lexicon of Sufism and the Passion of Al-Hallaj initiated the first line of textual study, translation and publication of sources that developed into the watershed of which the chief engineers were Henry Corbin and Seyyed Hossein Nasr.

Since the observation is pertinent that thus far the watershed is fed from a distinct French sphere of influence, a mental exercise is needed to broaden the view. It is clear that Seyyed Hossein Nasr's participation in the collaboration with Henry Corbin infused this field with a genuine consideration for some of the finer aspects (Irfan) of Islamic culture as seen from a proper native source – Iran – and adding a distinct contemporary sting to ecology.

It may be interesting to compare two contributions to Sufi studies from this same angle – (1) Seyyed Hossein Nasr "Revelation, Intellect and Reason in the Qu'ran" in "Sufi Essays" – London and Albany, New York 1972. – (2) Reza Arasteh: "Psychology of the Sufi Way to Individuation" in "Sufi Studies East and West" Rushbrook Williams ed. New York 1973. Both describe the control over the "nafs", the spiritual "breaths" that color man's essential character; a study comparing intelligence in its western and eastern traditional form. Pr. Arasteh had already introduced this "Sufi Way" in his academical work on psychiatric theory ("Final Integration in Adult Personality" Brill Leiden 1965).

== Idries Shah ==
Professor Reza Arasteh M. D. (who correspondenced with Thomas Merton) wrote in honour of Sayyid Idries Shah, whose standing as a scholar was as disputed as his communication to a general public was successful. Sayyid Idries Shah contributred to the wider dissemination of Sufi teachings in English through accessible writing and affordable editions of classical texts. His work also differed from the approaches of scolars such as Pr. Nicholson and Pr. Arberry. A comparison can be made between the eleven Naqshbandi rules or exercise-aims listed by Sayyid Idries Shah in chapter VII of Oriental Magic in 1957 with those published through the cited source .

"Oriental Magic" was read as a comparative study at the London Ethnological Institute. Sufi studies in general are directed as comparative studies of human understanding, and can be read as essays in psychosociology (see: Albert Hourani on "Marshall Hodgson and the Venture of Islam" in Islam in European Thought – Cambridge University Press 1991).

== Margaret Smith ==
Special note could be taken of the little cited but brilliant academic Margaret Smith who wrote (1925–1935) on the history of mysticism in the Near and Middle East from a woman's perspective leading to classic pages on early Christian mysticism, women in the early Christian Church, Christianity and Islam at the beginning of the Islamic era (see:Hanif), the rise of Sufism and the early ascetic ideal. Two exemplaries of her subject matter she studied in closer detail: Rabi'a al-'Adawiyya and Harith al-Muhasibi.

The summary of her work reposes in her:

Studies in Early Mysticism in the Near and Middle East. Being an account of the rise and development of Christian mysticism up to the seventh century, of the subsequent development of mysticism in Islam, known as Sufism, and of the relationship between Christian and Islamic Mysticism with references, a bibliography and two indexes

Dedicated to the memory of Thomas Walker Arnold
London, 1931 – The Sheldon Press; reprinted 1973 by Philo Press cv, Amsterdam

== Later academics ==
By the end of the 20th century, the academic study of Sufism was well established in university departments of religious studies.

The perspectives of these later scholars varied. Some were purely scientific, while some followed in the line of Massignon, or (sometimes privately) in the line of Guénon and the Traditionalists, modified somewhat for an academic environment.

One of the major trends within this later scholarship is comparative studies between specific Sufis and their counterparts in other religious traditions. Examples are Toshihiko Izutsu's Sufism and Taoism (1984), Michael Sells’ Mystical Languages of Unsaying (1994), Reza Shah-Kazemi's Paths to Transcendence (2006), and Saeed Zarrabi-Zadeh's Practical Mysticism in Islam and Christianity (2016).

For a contemporary academical "state of the art" see: "Sufism in the West", bibliography pp. 190–202 (Jamal Malik and John Hinnells ed. Routledge: London and New York, 2006).

== See also ==
- Institute of Sufi Studies
