= Hamallayya =

Hamallayya or Hamallism is a Sufi ṭarīqah (order, path) originating in West Africa as an outgrowth from and reaction against the Tijaniyyah brotherhood. It was founded at the beginning of the 20th century by a mystic Muhammad ben Amadu (d. 1909) of Maure and Fulani background, as reform movement of Tijaniyyah practice. Stressing opposition to hierarchy and downplaying the importance of education, the movement spread in the 1920s by Amadu's disciple Shaykh Hamahullah bin Muhammad bin Umar (1886–1943) in what was then French Soudan, modern Mali. It first took root amongst Wolof traders living in Nioro, but soon spread to servile caste Muslims in Mauretania and Mali.

== Doctrine ==
Hammallist doctrinal changes from Tijaniyyah ritual included the removal of some recited references to the Prophet, rejecting Qur'anic study, and the shouting of prayers in group worship. Hammallists tended to stress traditional West African ritual and the rejection of traditional hierarchies, including gender, age, and caste distinctions.

== Opposition and growth ==
Opposed to what it saw as the hierarchy of the then dominant Tijaniyyah order, Hamallism grew into a social protest movement, especially from poor or slave communities and opposed both the wealthy among African and the colonial government of French West Africa. From the 1920s to the 1940s, periodic flareups of Hamallist attributed protest and violence occurred in what is today Mali, Mauritania, Burkina Faso, Côte d'Ivoire, and Niger, and were suppressed by both the French authorities, and local Tijaniyyah leaders. Among the prominent converts to Hamallism were Tierno Bokar Salif Tall, grand nephew of the precolonial military and political leader of the Tijaniyya Jihad state El-Hadj Umar Tall, in Mali; and Yacouba Sylla in Mauretania. Other notable adherents included Tierno Bokar, the teacher and spiritual leader of Amadou Hampate Ba.

In Burkina Faso, Hamallism was especially present in the Fulbe Rimaibe (servile caste) communities into the 1950s.

== Suppression and survival ==
Hamahullah bin Muhammad bin Umar was exiled by French authorities from Nioro to Mauretania in 1933 following clashes between his followers and local leaders, then to Côte d'Ivoire and finally France, but the movement survived his death in exile. The movement was eventually made illegal in French West Africa, but continued, especially among the rural poor. It remains a political and religious force in parts of eastern Mali and western Niger, where it took root in traditional Tuareg servile cast communities, called Bellah. Followers still numbered 50,000 in Mali by the 1970s.
