= Jeff Wittman =

American football player (born 1971)

Profile
- Position: Fullback

Personal information
- Born: March 4, 1971 (age 55); Rochester, New York, U.S.
- Listed height: 6 ft 0 in (1.83 m)
- Listed weight: 210 lb (95 kg)

Career information
- High school: Gates Chili (NY)
- College: Ithaca (1989–1992)

Awards and highlights
- 3 × All-America first-team section (DIII); 1991 National champion (DIII)
- College Football Hall of Fame (Class of 2013)

Jeffrey M. Wittman (born March 4, 1971) is an American high school teacher and former gridiron football fullback.

== Biography ==
Wittman attended Gates Chili High School in Gates, New York, where he competed in football and wrestling. In football, he was a two-way player as a tailback and linebacker. While he expressed a desire to play in NCAA Division I, he went on to play college football at the NCAA Division III level. As a fullback for Ithaca College during the 1989–1992 seasons, Wittman was named a first-team All-American for Division III three times: 1990, 1991, and 1992. He was a member of the 1991 Ithaca Bombers football team that won the Division III championship, rushing for 159 yards and three touchdowns in the title game.

At the completion of his college career, Wittman held Ithaca records for touchdowns in a single season (19 in 1992), total points scored in a single season (114 in 1992), career rushing touchdowns (44), career touchdowns (45), career total points scored (270), and career rushing yards (3410); through the 2022 season, he continues to hold Ithaca records for most rushing yards in a single game (272 yards on November 14, 1992), average rushing yards-per-game for a season (134.3 in 1990), and career playoff points scored (68).

Following his collegiate career, Wittman became a teacher and coach within the Gates Chili Central School District in his hometown.

In 2001, Wittman was inducted to the athletic hall of fame at Ithaca College. In 2013, he was inducted into the College Football Hall of Fame. In 2014, he was inducted the athletic hall of fame at Gates Chili High School, and the walk of fame at Frontier Field in Rochester, New York. Wittman's college head coach was Jim Butterfield, also an inductee of the College Football Hall of Fame.
