= Gates Chili High School =

Location
- 3 Spartan Way; Rochester, New York 14624; United States; 43.1545°N 77.7060°W

Information
- Type: Public
- Established: 1958
- School district: Gates Chili Central School District
- NCES School ID: 361188000950
- Principal: Thomas Hammel (interim)
- Teaching staff: 102.33 (on an FTE basis)
- Grades: 9–12
- Enrollment: 1,127 (2023–2024)
- Student to teacher ratio: 11.01
- Campus: Suburban
- Colors: Blue and White
- Mascot: Spartans
- Yearbook: Gateways
- Website: hs.gateschili.org

Gates Chili High School is a secondary school in the Gates Chili Central School District in Gates, New York. It opened in September 1958. As of October 2023, the current principal is Thomas Hammel (interim).

Gates Chili High School has a science wing, with an aquatics laboratory and botany study areas, an art and graphic arts wing for the study of classic art as well as technology applications for print and video, a 9,000-square-foot (840 m^{2}) library, a career and counseling center and a field house with a 22,000-square-foot (2,000 m^{2}) gymnasium, fitness center, swimming pool and an indoor track.

== Enrollment ==
As of the 2022–23 school year: 546 male, 584 female

== Notable alumni ==
- Lou Gramm (1968), Lead Singer for Foreigner
- Kenneth Bianchi (1970), serial killer
- Thom Metzger (1974), writer
- Jeff Wittman (1989), former college football player and College Football Hall of Famer
- Clint Hurtt (1996), coach for the Philadelphia Eagles
- Yuri Lavrynenko (1996), MLS player
- Agathi Georgiou Graham (2003), owner of Arbor Venues, Agathi & Company, and Bruno's Blessings https://arborvenues.com/
- Ernest Jackson (2005), former CFL wide receiver
- Gerald Beverly (2011), basketball player who played overseas
- Cierra Dillard (2014), basketball player who plays overseas
