= Gates Chili Central School District =

School district in New York, United States

Location
- 3 Spartan Way; Rochester, New York 14624 Gates, New York and Chili, New York United States
- Coordinates: 43.153415°N 77.709906°W

District information
- Type: Public
- Motto: Together we teach and inspire excellence for all learners
- Grades: Pre-K–12 and adult education
- Established: September 1956
- Superintendent: Christopher J. Dailey
- Asst. superintendent(s): Carol Stehm
- Accreditation: New York State Education Department
- Schools: Four elementary schools (UPK–5); One middle school (6–8); One senior high school (9–12)
- Budget: ▲US $99.7 million (2015–2016)
- NCES District ID: 3611880

Students and staff
- Students: ▲4,069 (2015–2016)
- Teachers: ▲451 (2015–2016)
- Staff: ▲402 (2015–2016)
- District mascot: Spartan (Spartacus)
- Colors: Blue/White

Other information
- Unions: NYSUT, Gates Chili Teachers' Association
- Website: www.gateschili.org

The Gates Chili Central School District is a public school district in Rochester, New York that serves approximately 4,000 students in most of the town of Gates and a large portion of the town of Chili in Monroe County, with over 850 employees and an operating budget of $100 million (approx. $25,628 per student).

The Gates Chili school district opened in September 1956 as a consolidation of four Union free School districts (Thomas Edison, Warren Harding, Washington Irving and Florence Brasser), approved by voters of the four districts on December 8, 1955. The District celebrated its 50th anniversary in 2006.

The average class size is 22 students (elementary), and 21 students (middle-high school). The student–teacher ratio is 13:1 (elementary), 13:1 (middle-high school).

Christopher Dailey was selected by the Board of Education to serve as Superintendent of Schools beginning in July 2019. The former superintendent, Kimberle Ward, left the position in December 2018, with Carol Stehm serving as Interim Superintendent.

== Organization ==
The Board of Education (BOE) consists of nine members who serve rotating three-year terms. Elections are held each May for board members and to vote on the school district's budget.

Current board members are:

- Catherine (Katie) Coffee, President
- Dr. Christine Brown Richards, Vice-president
- Andrea Minchella
- Adam Reinhardt
- Kathryn Davis
- Michelle Jennings
- Robert Long
- Nicole Littlewood
- Tanya Srbinovski
- Condenessa Brown, District Clerk
- Key'Andre Joseph, Student Ex-Officio

Superintendents
Name	Tenure
Cecil W. Luffman	September 1956 – June 1962
William J. Kirkmire	July 1962 – October 1965
William G. Hagenlocher	October 1965 – January 1967 (acting); January 1967 – 1977
William J. Dadey	1977 – February 2003
Richard A. Stein	February 2003 – December 2008
Richard E. Mace	January 2009 – July 2009
Mark C. Davey	July 2009 – July 2013
Carol B. Stehm	July 2013 – February 2014 (interim)
Kimberle A. Ward	February 2014 – December 2018
Carol B. Stehm	December 2018 – June 2019 (interim)
Christopher Dailey	July 2019 –

== Schools ==
=== Elementary schools ===
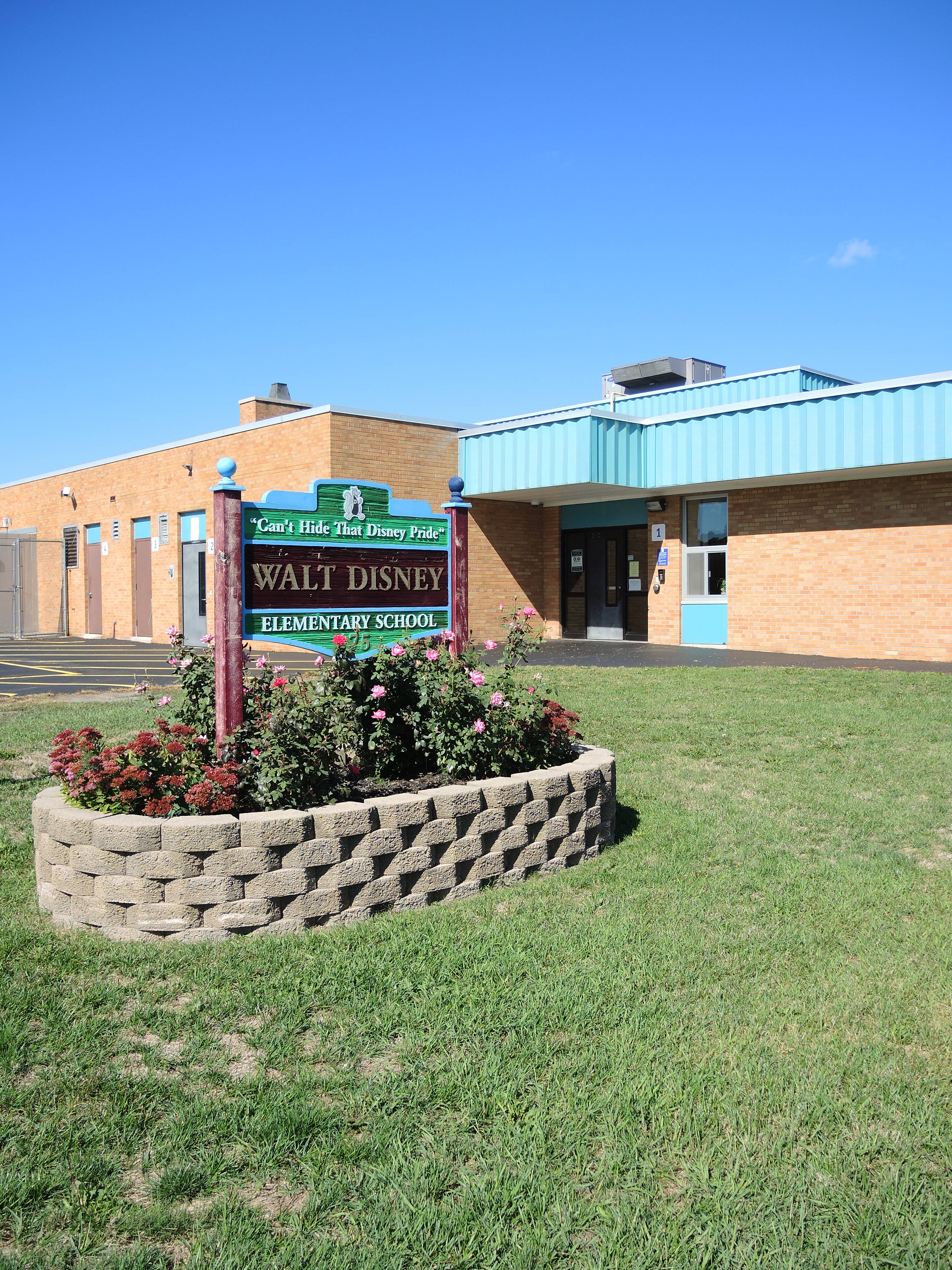
Front entrance to the Walt Disney Elementary School

- Neil Armstrong Elementary School (UPK-5) (opened 1968), Principal – Rebecca Scott, Assistant Principal - Lindsey Georger
- Florence Brasser Elementary School (UPK-5), Principal – Lora Bower, Assistant Principal - Kylie Smith
- Walt Disney Elementary School (UPK-5) (opened 1967), Principal – Erin Ugine, Assistant Principal - Costadinos Tavelaris
- Paul Road Elementary School (UPK-5) (opened 1967), Principal – Andraya Cutaia, Assistant Principal - Kimberly Doty

Former

- Washington Irving Elementary School (K–5) (closed 1986 due to declining enrollment. Re-opened in 1992 and closed again in 2008)
- Warren Harding Elementary School (closed 1982, now Northstar Christian Academy)
- Thomas Edison Elementary School (closed 1980 due to declining enrollment, now Hope Hall)

=== Middle school ===
- Gates Chili Middle School (6–8) (opened 1963), Principal – Dr. Daniel Zdanowski
- 6th grade Asst. Principal - Michelle Dossier
- 7th grade Asst. Principal - Andrew Episcopo
- 8th grade Asst. Principal - Kenyala Rollins

=== High school ===
- Gates Chili High School (9–12) (opened September 1958), Principal – Thomas Hammel

Beginning in 2005, the Gates Chili High School began extensive renovations, partnering with AScribe. The renovations, which concluded on September 11, 2008 at a cost of approximately $48,000,000 USD, created a larger library and guidance counseling wing, added a new Science Atrium, added a new front entrance, created more parking spaces for students and faculty, and built a new field house, housing an indoor track, fitness center, and pool. Residents of both Gates and Chili are eligible to sign up to use the new athletic facilities.

=== Phase X Capital Project and Redistricting ===
In October 2012, Gates Chili voters approved a measure to begin repairing infrastructure in all six of the schools. The estimated cost, $10.8 million, would be covered by state grants and reserve funds. Scheduled fixes include complete roof replacements at several of the schools, upgrading windows to provide energy conservation, and structural repairs to nearly every school. Repairs to the outdoor football and track stadium lighting is also budgeted into this project. The project began its work this past summer, and was scheduled to be completed by the end of Summer 2014.

In 2013, the Gates Chili School District proposed a redistricting for the remaining four elementary schools – Paul Road, Florence Brasser, Neil Armstrong, and Walt Disney – beginning in September 2014. The current plans would remove 75 ESOL students from Florence Brasser and split them into two sub groups at Paul Road and Walt Disney. Redistricting would also even out enrollment levels at all four schools – Paul Road and Neil Armstrong would see their enrollment cut by roughly 75 students, leaving them with 475 kids. Walt Disney would get about 61 students to put them at 475 as well, and Florence Brasser would get 67 students to put them at 350 students. The plan is still being worked out, with a deadline of Spring 2014 for a final decision.

== Noted alumni ==
Name	Class	Noted For
Lou Gramm (real name Louis Grammatico)	1968	Lead singer of the 1980s rock band "Foreigner"
Kenneth Bianchi	1970	Hillside Strangler
Th. Metzger	1974	writer, aka Leander Watts
John Fossitt	2001	Keyboardist for Bruno Mars
Ernest Jackson	2005	Wide receiver for the Ottawa Redblacks
Brittanee Drexel	2010	Went missing during a spring break trip to Myrtle Beach, South Carolina in 2009.pc
Cierra Dillard	2014	Player for the Minnesota Lynx of the WNBA
Clint Hurtt	1995	Assistant coach for Seattle Seahawks of the NFL
