= Peter Lamborn Wilson =

American political writer, poet, and essayist (1945–2022)

- Wilson, circa 1970s
- Born: October 20, 1945; Baltimore, Maryland, U.S.
- Died: May 22, 2022 (aged 76); Saugerties, New York, U.S.
- Resting place: Woodstock Artists Cemetery in Woodstock, New York
- Other name: Hakim Bey (pen name)
- Awards: Firecracker Alternative Book Award, 1996 (for Pirate Utopias)

Philosophical work
- Era: Contemporary philosophy; 20th-century philosophy; 21st-century philosophy
- Region: Western philosophy; American philosophy
- School: Post-anarchism; Individualist anarchism
- Main interests: Refusal of work; Post-industrial society; Mysticism; Utopianism
- Notable ideas: Temporary autonomous zones; Pirate utopia; Ontological anarchy

Peter Lamborn Wilson (October 20, 1945 – May 22, 2022) was an American anarchist author, philosopher, poet, translator, and essayist. He is primarily known for his concept of Temporary Autonomous Zones, short-lived spaces that elude formal structures of control. During the 1970s, Wilson lived in the Middle East and worked at the Imperial Iranian Academy of Philosophy under the guidance of Iranian philosopher Seyyed Hossein Nasr, where he explored Sufism, mysticism, and Persian literature. Starting in the 1980s, he wrote numerous political and countercultural texts under the pen name Hakim Bey, developing ideas such as "ontological anarchy", "poetic terrorism", and "immediatism". His work circulated through small presses, zine networks, anarchist milieus, radio, rave culture, and later academic discussions of post-anarchism, cyberculture, and radical protest. His style of anarchism has drawn criticism for its emphasis on individualism and mysticism, as did some of his writings about pederasty, which he later regretted.

== Life ==
Wilson was born in Baltimore on October 20, 1945. While undertaking a classics major at Columbia University, Wilson met Warren Tartaglia, then introducing Islam to students as the leader of a group called the Noble Moors. Attracted by the philosophy, Wilson was initiated into the group, but later joined a group of breakaway members who founded the Moorish Orthodox Church. The Church maintained a presence at the League for Spiritual Discovery, the group established by Timothy Leary.

Appalled by the social and political climate, Wilson decided to leave the United States, and shortly after the assassination of Martin Luther King Jr., in 1968 he flew to Lebanon, later reaching India with the intention of studying Sufism, but became fascinated by Tantra, tracking down Ganesh Baba. He spent a month in a Kathmandu missionary hospital being treated for hepatitis, and practised meditation techniques in a cave above the east bank of the Ganges. He also allegedly ingested significant quantities of cannabis.

Wilson travelled on to Pakistan. There he lived in several places, mixing with princes, Sufis, and gutter dwellers, and moving from teahouses to opium dens. In Quetta he found "a total disregard of all government", with people reliant on family, clans or tribes, which appealed to him.

Wilson then moved to Iran, where he developed his scholarship. He translated classical Persian texts with French scholar Henry Corbin, and also worked as a journalist at the Tehran Journal. During his years in Iran, Wilson was also connected to the Shiraz Arts Festival, visiting the festival and writing on some of its projects. In 1974, Farah Pahlavi, Empress of Iran, commissioned her personal secretary, scholar Seyyed Hossein Nasr, to establish the Imperial Iranian Academy of Philosophy. Nasr offered Wilson the position of director of its English-language publications, and editorship of its journal Sophia Perennis, which Wilson edited from 1975 until 1978. He would go on to also publish on the Ni'matullāhī Sufi Order and Isma'ilism with Nasrollah Pourjavady.

Following the Iranian Revolution in 1979, Wilson lived in New York City, sharing a brownstone townhouse with William Burroughs, with whom he bonded over their shared interests. Burroughs acknowledged Wilson for providing material on Hassan-i Sabbah which he used for his novel The Western Lands.

In the 1980s, Wilson became associated with New York's underground publishing and radio scenes. He hosted the late-night WBAI program Moorish Orthodox Radio Crusade, a freeform radio show connected to the Moorish Orthodox milieu, on which he read from zines, took calls, and played music gathered during his travels.

In later life, Wilson lived in upstate New York in conditions he termed "independently poor". He has been described as "a subcultural monument".

Towards the end of his life, he showed an interest in the Bābī religion, especially in its Azali form. This was mentioned in his two final books published in early 2022.

Wilson died of heart failure on May 22, 2022, in Saugerties, New York.

== Pen name ==
Wilson's occasional pen name of Hakim Bey was derived from il-Hakim, the alchemist-king, with "Bey" a further nod to Moorish Science. Wilson's two personas, as himself and Bey, were facilitated by his publishers, who provided separate author biographies even when both appeared in the same publication.

== Ideas and writings ==
=== Ontological anarchy ===
In Immediatism (1994), a compilation of essays, Wilson explained his particular conception of anarchism and anarchy, which he called ontological anarchy. He posits that since absolute certainty about the "true nature of things" is impossible, all human endeavors are fundamentally "founded on nothing". This perspective embraces chaos not as an absence, but as the essence of life and becoming, contrasting it with order, which is seen as death or cessation.

Unlike traditional anarchism, which might seek a new form of order, ontological anarchy asserts that no "state" can truly exist within chaos, rendering all governance impossible. The goal is not a "Revolutionary" institution, but a continuous evasion of power and a pursuit of the excessive and strange. In the same compilation, Wilson discussed his view of individuals' relations to the outside world as perceived by the senses, and a theory of liberation that he called "immediatism."

=== Temporary Autonomous Zones ===
Wilson wrote articles on types of what he called temporary autonomous zones (TAZ), of which he said in an interview:

... "the real genesis was my connection to the communal movement in America, my experiences in the 1960s in places like Timothy Leary's commune in Millbrook ... Usually only the religious ones last longer than a generation—and usually at the expense of becoming quite authoritarian, and probably dismal and boring as well. I've noticed that the exciting ones tend to disappear, and as I began to further study this phenomenon, I found that they tend to disappear in a year or a year and a half.

He wrote about TAZs at length in the book TAZ: The Temporary Autonomous Zone, Ontological Anarchy, Poetic Terrorism, published by Autonomedia in 1991. The book incorporated and reworked material from earlier small-press and performance contexts. Its publication note states that CHAOS: The Broadsheets of Ontological Anarchism was first published in 1985 by Grim Reaper Press, while "The Temporary Autonomous Zone" was performed at the Jack Kerouac School of Disembodied Poetics in Boulder and on WBAI-FM in New York City in 1990. At the time of his death the book had sold over 100,000 copies and was the publisher's perennial bestseller.

=== Poetic terrorism and immediatism ===
Wilson's writings as Hakim Bey also developed the ideas of "poetic terrorism" and "immediatism". In these texts he proposed symbolic, ludic, and often ephemeral acts of disruption that would interrupt ordinary social life without necessarily taking the form of conventional political organization. These ideas were closely related to his theory of the temporary autonomous zone, but placed greater emphasis on aesthetic intervention, direct experience, and the creation of temporary moments of intensity.

=== Sufism and esotericism ===
Alongside his anarchist and countercultural writings, Wilson produced translations, essays, and edited volumes on Sufism, Persian poetry, Islamic heterodoxy, and Western esotericism. His works in this area include Kings of Love, The Drunken Universe, Sacred Drift, Scandal: Essays in Islamic Heresy, and later studies of Yezidi and Bābī traditions. His writing frequently connected religious antinomianism, mystical experience, heresy, and libertarian politics.

== Reception and influence ==
Wilson took an interest in the subculture of zines flourishing in Manhattan in the early 1980s, zines being tiny hand-made photocopied magazines published in small quantities concerning whatever the publishers found compelling. "He began writing essays, communiqués as he liked to call them, under the pen name Hakim Bey, which he mailed to friends and publishers of the 'zines' he liked. ... His mailouts were immediately popular, and regarded as copyright-free syndicated columns ready for anyone to paste into their photocopied 'zines'..."

His Temporary Autonomous Zones work has been referenced in comparison to the "free party" or teknival scene of the rave subculture. Wilson was supportive of the rave connection, while remarking in an interview, "The ravers were among my biggest readers ... I wish they would rethink all this techno stuff — they didn't get that part of my writing."

According to Gavin Grindon, in the 1990s, the British group Reclaim the Streets was heavily influenced by the ideas put forward in Hakim Bey's The Temporary Autonomous Zone. Their adoption of the carnivalesque into their form of protest evolved eventually into the first "global street party" held in cities across the world on May 16, 1998, the day of a G8 summit meeting in Birmingham. These "parties", explained Grindon, in turn developed into the Carnivals Against Capitalism, in London on June 18, 1999, organized by Reclaim the Streets in coordination with worldwide antiglobalization protests called by the international network Peoples' Global Action during the 25th G8 summit meeting in Cologne, Germany.

Wilson's work has also been discussed in academic studies of post-anarchism, cyberculture, and radical cultural politics. Simon Sellars examined Bey's influence and the later afterlives of the TAZ concept in the Journal for the Study of Radicalism. Leonard Williams described Wilson's ontological anarchism as a significant strand of post-anarchist thought. John Armitage, by contrast, criticized Bey's politics of cyberculture in Angelaki, arguing that his celebration of temporary autonomy remained politically limited.

=== Controversy over writings on sexuality ===
Some writers have been troubled by what they took to be Bey's endorsement of adults having sex with children, which included writing for NAMBLA's newsletter. Michael Muhammad Knight, a novelist and former friend of Wilson, stated that "writing for NAMBLA amounts to activism in real life. As Hakim Bey, Peter creates a child molester's liberation theology and then publishes it for an audience of potential offenders." In a compilation of memorial tributes in The Brooklyn Rail published a few months after Wilson's death, many writers defended Wilson and rejected the accusation of pedophilia. Kalan Sherrard wrote that after "meeting tons of young people who grew up with him it became totally evident he had never hurt anyone / and people were just freaked out by his writing".

=== Criticism by anarchist writers ===
Murray Bookchin included Wilson's work as Bey in what he called "lifestyle anarchism", where he criticized Wilson's writing for tendencies towards mysticism, occultism, and irrationalism. Bob Black wrote a rejoinder to Bookchin in Anarchy after Leftism.

John Zerzan described Bey as a "postmodern liberal", possessing a "method" that was "as appalling as his claims to truthfulness, and essentially conforms to textbook postmodernism. Aestheticism plus knownothingism is the [...] formula; cynical as to the possibility of meaning, allergic to analysis, hooked on trendy word-play", and "basically reformist".

== Works ==
- The Winter Calligraphy of Ustad Selim, & Other Poems (1975) (Ipswich, England), ISBN 0-903880-05-9
- Science and Technology in Islam (1976) (with Leonard Harrow)
- Traditional Modes of Contemplation & Action (1977) (editor, with Yusuf Ibish)
- Nasir-I Khusraw: 40 Poems from the Divan (1977) (translator and editor, with Gholamreza Aavani), ISBN 0-87773-730-4
- DIVAN (Crescent Moon Press, 300 signed and numbered copies, 1978) (poems, London/Tehran)
- Kings of Love: The Poetry and History of the Nimatullahi Sufi Order of Iran (1978) (translator and editor, with Nasrollah Pourjavady; Tehran)
- Angels (1980, 1994), ISBN 0-500-11017-4 (abridged edition: ISBN 0-500-81044-3)
- Weaver of Tales: Persian Picture Rugs (1980) (with Karl Schlamminger)
- Divine Flashes (1982) (by Fakhruddin 'Iraqi, translated and introduced with William C. Chittick; Paulist Press (Mahwah, New Jersey)), ISBN 0-8091-2372-X
- Crowstone: The Chronicles of Qamar (1983) (as Hakim)
- CHAOS: The Broadsheets of Ontological Anarchism (1985) (as Hakim Bey; Grim Reaper Press (Weehawken, New Jersey))
- Semiotext(e) USA (1987) (co-editor, with Jim Fleming)
- Scandal: Essays in Islamic Heresy (1988) (Autonomedia (Brooklyn, New York)), ISBN 0-936756-15-2
- The Drunken Universe: An Anthology of Persian Sufi Poetry (1988) (translator and editor, with Nasrollah Pourjavady), ISBN 0-933999-65-8
- Semiotext(e) SF (1989) (co-editor, with Rudy Rucker and Robert Anton Wilson)
- Rants and Incendiary Tracts (1989) (his writing is featured in the final chapter)
- The Universe: A Mirror of Itself (1992?) (Xexoxial Editions (La Farge, Wisconsin))
- Aimless Wanderings: Chuang Tzu's Chaos Linguistics (1993) (as Hakim Bey; Xexoxial Editions (La Farge, Wisconsin))
- Sacred Drift: Essays on the Margins of Islam (1993) (City Lights Books (San Francisco)) ISBN 0-87286-275-5
- The Little Book of Angel Wisdom (1993, 1997), ISBN 1-85230-436-7, ISBN 1-86204-048-6
- O Tribe That Loves Boys: The Poetry of Abu Nuwas (1993) (translator and editor, as Hakim Bey), ISBN 90-800857-3-1
- Immediatism: Essays by Hakim Bey (AK Press 1994; cover by Freddie Baer)
- Pirate Utopias: Moorish Corsairs and European Renegadoes (1995, 2003) (Autonomedia (Brooklyn, New York)), ISBN 1-57027-158-5
- Millennium (1996) (as Hakim Bey; Autonomedia (Brooklyn, New York) and Garden of Delight (Dublin, Ireland)), ISBN 1-57027-045-7
- "Shower of Stars" Dream & Book: The Initiatic Dream in Sufism and Taoism (1996) (Autonomedia (Brooklyn, New York)), ISBN 1-57027-036-8
- Escape from the Nineteenth Century and Other Essays (1998) (Autonomedia (Brooklyn, New York)), ISBN 1-57027-073-2
- Wild Children (1998) (co-editor, with Dave Mandl)
- Avant Gardening: Ecological Struggle in the City & the World (1999) (co-editor, with Bill Weinberg), ISBN 1-57027-092-9
- Ploughing the Clouds: The Search for Irish Soma (1999), ISBN 0-87286-326-3
- TAZ: The Temporary Autonomous Zone, Ontological Anarchy, Poetic Terrorism, Second Edition (2003) (as Hakim Bey; incorporates full text of CHAOS and Aimless Wanderings; Autonomedia (Brooklyn, New York)), ISBN 1-57027-151-8 (cover by Freddie Baer)
- Orgies of the Hemp Eaters (2004) (co-editor as Hakim Bey with Abel Zug), ISBN 1-57027-143-7
- rain queer (2005) (Farfalla Press (Brooklyn, New York)) ISBN 0-9766341-1-2
- Cross-Dressing in the Anti-Rent War (Portable Press at Yo-Yo Labs chapbook, 2005)
- Gothick Institutions (2005), ISBN 0-9770049-0-2
- Green Hermeticism: Alchemy and Ecology (with Christopher Bamford and Kevin Townley, Lindisfarne Press (2007)), ISBN 1-58420-049-9
- Black Fez Manifesto as Hakim Bey (2008), ISBN 978-1-57027-187-8
- Atlantis Manifesto (2nd edition, 2009), Shivastan Publishing limited edition
- Abecedarium (2010), ISBN 978-0977004980
- Ec(o)logues (Station Hill of Barrytown, 2011), ISBN 978-1-58177-115-2
- Nostalgia/Utopia with Francesco Clemente (Hirmer Publishers, Mary Boone Gallery, 2012), ISBN 978-3-7774-5321-7
- Spiritual Destinations of an Anarchist (2014), ISBN 978-1620490563
- Spiritual Journeys of an Anarchist (2014), ISBN 978-1620490549
- Riverpeople (2014), ISBN 978-1570272608
- Opium Dens I Have Known with Chris Martin (2014), Shivastan Publishing limited edition
- Eclogues (Pilot Editions, Publication Studio Hudson, 2014), ISBN 978-1624620829
- Anarchist Ephemera (2016), ISBN 978-1620490709
- False Documents (Barrytown/Station Hill Press, Inc., 2016), ISBN 978-1581771404
- Heresies: Anarchist Memoirs, Anarchist Art (2016), ISBN 978-1570273001
- School of Nite with Nancy Goldring (2016), ISBN 978-1941550823
- Night Market Noodles and Other Tales (2017), ISBN 978-1570273162
- The Temple of Perseus at Panopolis (2017), ISBN 978-1570272875
- Vanished Signs (2018), ISBN 978-0999783115
- Lucky Shadows (2018), ISBN 978-1936687435
- The New Nihilism (Bottle of Smoke Press, 2018), ISBN 978-1937073725
- Utopian Trace: An Oral Presentation (2019), ISBN 978-0578491103
- The American Revolution as a Gigantic Real Estate Scam: And Other Essays in Lost/Found History (2019), ISBN 978-1570273575
- Cauda Pavonis: Esoteric Antinomianism in the Yezidi Tradition (2019), ISBN 978-1945147401
- Hoodoo Metaphysics with Tamara Gonzales (Bearpuff Press, 2019), ISBN 978-0-9829039-5-7
- Polyphony (60 copies printed on Risograph at Publication Studio Hudson, September 2019, 2nd Edition)
- Mohawk Anglican Freemasons (Publication Studio Hudson, 2020)
- False Messiah: Crypto-Xtian Tracts and Fragments (2022), ISBN 978-1735043210
- Peacock Angel: The Esoteric Tradition of the Yezidis (2022), ISBN 978-1644114124
