= Moorish Orthodox Church of America =

Religious movement in the United States

- Formation: 1962 (per article body; intro states 1965)
- Founder: Warren Tartaglia
- Type: Syncretic, non-exclusive, religious anarchist movement
- Headquarters: New York City
- Location: United States
- Publication: Moorish Science Monitor (1965–1967, revived periodically)
- Affiliations: Noble Order of Moorish Sufis

The Moorish Orthodox Church of America is a syncretic, non-exclusive, and religious anarchist movement originally founded in New York City in 1965 and part of the burgeoning psychedelic church movement of the mid to late 1960s in the United States.

== Influences ==
The Moorish Orthodox Church of America incorporates a vast array of liturgical and devotional traditions ranging from Moorish Science, the Five Percenters, the Episcopi vagantes movement, Nizari Islam, Sufism (particularly from the Sufi Order Ināyati, Shadhili, Alevi-Bektashi and Uwaisi traditions), varying degrees of Theosophical mysticism, Hermeticism, Oriental Orthodoxy, the League for Spiritual Discovery, Western esotericism, Neoplatonism, Tantra, Zoroastrianism, Taoism, and Vedanta. These influences were brought into the Church by early founding members, and have been added to over the last 40 years. Thus the list of spiritual influences grows as the Church has aged.

The Church has historically exhibited strong anarchist, socialist, and utopian political orientations. These include the works of Charles Fourier, Abdullah Öcalan, Noel Ignatiev, Hakim Bey, Friedrich Nietzsche, Murray Bookchin, Mikhail Bakhtin, Karl Marx, Pierre-Joseph Proudhon, Max Stirner, Marcus Garvey, Malcolm X, the Industrial Workers of the World, and John Henry Mackay. Combined influences also include Brethren of the Free Spirit, English Dissenters, William Blake, and Ivan Illich.

== History ==
A lineage group of the Moorish Science Temple of America, the Moorish Orthodox Church was founded in New York City in 1962 primarily by Warren Tartaglia, beatniks, spiritual seekers, anarchists and members of the Noble Order of Moorish Sufis (a group that grew out of the Moorish Science Temple #13 in Baltimore on July 7, 1957). The Moorish Orthodox Church of America published a journal entitled the Moorish Science Monitor from 1965–1967, which has been revived at times over the next few decades. Moorish Orthodoxy was founded to explore the more esoteric dimensions of Noble Drew Ali's Moorish Science teachings, but quickly developed into a movement of spiritual exploration beyond its intended purpose, though it maintains Moorish Science as its core. After a long period of quiescence, the Moorish Orthodox Church of America experienced a small renaissance in the mid-1980s owing to the involvement of former members of the Beat/beatnik movement, the counter-cultural hippie community, and the gay liberation movement, along with the continued involvement of Sultan Rafi Sharif Bey (who founded the Moorish League) and the prolific writings of Hakim Bey.

== Notable members ==
- Muhammed al-Ahari
- Hakim Bey
- Sultan Rafi Sharif Bey
- Carey Harrison
- Warren Tartaglia
- Bill Weinberg
- David Hanson (robotics designer)
- Nick Herbert (physicist)
- Michael Muhammad Knight
- Thom Metzger
