= Ernest Jackson (gridiron football) =

American gridiron football player (born 1986)

No. 82, 9
- Position: Wide receiver

Personal information
- Born: October 9, 1986 (age 40); Rochester, New York, U.S.
- Listed height: 6 ft 2 in (1.88 m)
- Listed weight: 220 lb (100 kg)

Career information
- High school: Gates Chili
- College: Buffalo (2005–2008)
- NFL draft: 2009: undrafted

Career history
- 2011: Erie Explosion
- 2012: Chicago Slaughter
- 2012–2014: BC Lions
- 2015–2016: Ottawa Redblacks
- 2017–2018: Montreal Alouettes

Awards and highlights
- Grey Cup champion (2016); Terry Evanshen Trophy (2016); CFL All-Star (2016)

Career CFL statistics
- Receptions: 364
- Receiving yards: 4,852
- Receiving touchdowns: 26
- Rushing yards: 147
- Rushing touchdowns: 1
- Stats at CFL.ca

Ernest Jackson (born October 9, 1986) is an American former professional football player who was a wide receiver in the Canadian Football League (CFL). He played college football at the University at Buffalo. He played professionally for the Erie Explosion of the Ultimate Indoor Football League (UIFL), the Chicago Slaughter of the Indoor Football League (IFL), and the BC Lions, Ottawa Redblacks, and Montreal Alouettes of the CFL.

== Early life and college ==
Ernest Jackson was born on October 9, 1986, in Rochester, New York. He attended Gates Chili High School in Rochester.

He was a four-year letterman for the Buffalo Bulls of the University at Buffalo from 2005 to 2008.

== Professional career ==
Jackson had a breakout season with the BC Lions in 2014 and was named CFL Offensive Player of the Month for October of the 2014 season.

On February 10, 2015, Jackson signed with the Ottawa Redblacks. the Redblacks were coming off their inaugural season in which their receiving corps struggled mightily. In his first two seasons in Ottawa, Jackson played a major role in the offense; he was named the East Division finalist for Most Outstanding Player of the year award following the 2016 regular season. Jackson finished the season with ten receiving touchdowns, tied for the second-most in the league. In the 2016 Grey Cup, Jackson scored the game-winning touchdown in overtime against the Calgary Stampeders. Following the 2016 season he was not re-signed by the Redblacks and became a free-agent.

Jackson was considered one of the best free agent wide receivers and signed a two-year contract with the Montreal Alouettes (CFL) on February 16, 2017. In two seasons, Jackson never missed a game, and put up 112 catches for 1,409 yards and 7 majors, while the Alouettes struggled with records of 3–15 in 2017 and 5–13 in 2018. In January 2019, he signed a contract extension with Montreal. He was released just prior to training camp for the 2019 season on May 19, 2019.

=== CFL statistics ===
Year	Team	G	Rec	Yards	Avg	TD	Long
2012	BC	10	27	347	12.9	1	50
2013	BC	2	4	32	8	0	18
2014	BC	14	49	813	16.6	3	65
2015	OTT	18	84	1,026	12.2	5	55
2016	OTT	17	88	1,225	13.9	10	62
2017	MTL	18	60	757	12.8	6	80
2018	MTL	18	52	642	12.3	1	52
Totals		97	364	4,852	13.3	26	80
