= Pirate utopia =

Form of autonomous proto-anarchist society

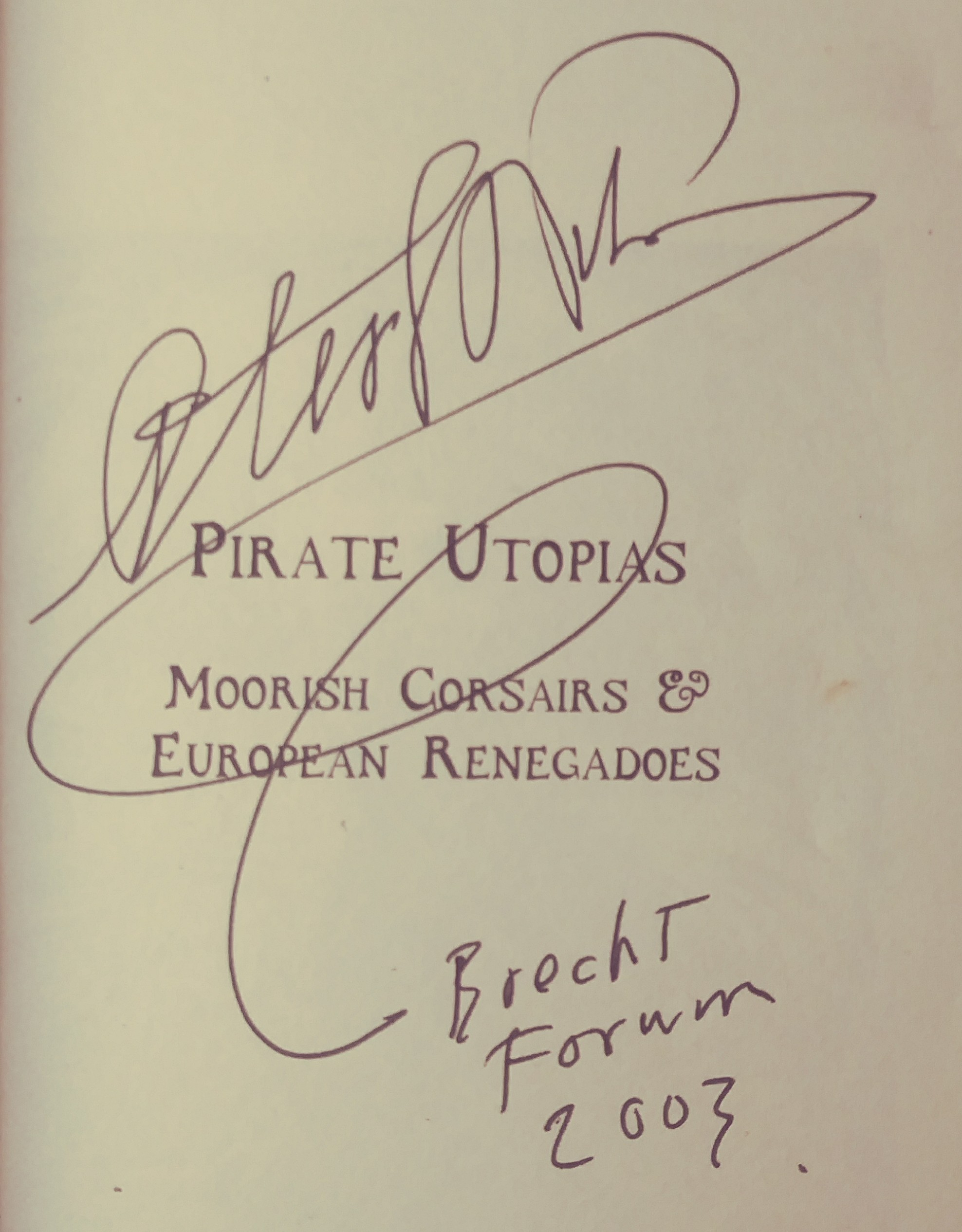
Autographed title page of Wilson's Pirate Utopias

Pirate utopias were defined by anarchist writer Peter Lamborn Wilson, who coined the term in his 1995 book Pirate Utopias: Moorish Corsairs & European Renegadoes, as secret islands once used for supply purposes by pirates. Wilson's concept is largely based on speculation, although he admits to adding a bit of fantasy to the idea. In Wilson's view, these pirate enclaves were early forms of autonomous proto-anarchist societies in that they operated beyond the reach of governments and embraced unrestricted freedom.

== On the Barbary Coast ==
Located on the Barbary Coast (Salé, Algiers, and Tunis), these bases were havens for renegade Muslim pirates from the 16th to the 18th century. The pirates, dubbed "Barbary Corsairs", ravaged European shipping operations and enslaved many thousands of captives. Wilson focuses on the Pirate Republic of Salé, in 17th-century Morocco, which may have had its own lingua franca. Like some other pirate states, it even used to pass treaties from time to time with some European countries, agreeing not to attack their fleets. Wilson/Bey's idea of Temporary Autonomous Zones developed from his historical review of pirate utopias. In describing them, Wilson has said:

We've certainly had to use our imagination more than a "real" historian would allow, erecting a lot of suppositions on a shaky framework of generalizations, and adding a touch of fantasy (and what piratologist has ever been able to resist fantasy?). I can only say that I've satisfied my own curiosity at least to this extent: That something like a Renegado culture could have existed; that all the ingredients for it were present, and contiguous, and synchronic.

== Connection to Islam ==
Wilson writes about the large influx of Europeans converting to Islam, forming the "Renegados" and joining the pirate holy war. He then takes an interesting approach regarding 17th century Europeans and their opposition to Islam. He asks if Europeans were opposed to Islam or if Islam had a "positive shadow" that made it so attractive for pirates? Was there something that was intriguing to a pirate about Islam, or was there a change in belief that many Europeans experienced? Wilson goes on to write that these men and women were not only apostates and traitors, as they were considered in their homelands, but their voluntary betrayal of Christendom can also be thought of as a praxis of social resistance.

== Libertatia ==
Libertatia, also known as Libertalia, was a possibly fictional anarchist colony founded in the late 17th century in Madagascar by pirates under the leadership of Captain James Misson. Whether or not Libertatia actually existed is disputed. Captain Charles Johnson describes Libertatia in his book A General History of the Pyrates. Much of the book is a mixture of fact and fiction, and it is possible the account of Libertatia is entirely fabricated. According to Johnson's description, Libertatia lasted for about 25 years. The precise location is not known; however, most sources say it stretched from the Bay of Antongil to Mananjary, including Île Sainte Marie and Foulpointe. Thomas Tew, Misson, and an Italian Dominican priest named Caraccioli were involved in founding it.

== In literature and popular culture ==
Cities of the Red Night, a novel by American author William S. Burroughs, revolves around a group of radical pirates who seek the freedom to live under the articles set out by Captain James Misson. The attempted establishment of a Republic of Pirates is a significant plot element in the Ubisoft video game Assassin's Creed IV: Black Flag. In the movie Pirates of the Caribbean 3: At World's End the main characters gather at "Shipwreck Cove", a city built out of wrecked ships and constructed platforms.

The TV series Black Sails is largely based on the historical pirate inhabitants of Nassau, as well as characters based on Robert Louis Stevenson's novel Treasure Island. Libertalia is also a central plot element and setting in the video game Uncharted 4: A Thief's End; however, in this interpretation, Libertalia was founded by the pirate Henry Avery and others including Tew, Anne Bonny, and Edward England.

The 2015 video game Fallout 4 features an area in the game called "Libertalia". The area is a series of off-shore platforms (made of various debris) that has become home to a large gang of raiders. British author Warren Ellis writes in Bruce Sterling's book Pirate Utopia about Libertalia and negatively appraising its existence.

== See also ==
- Porto Farina
- Republic of Pirates
- Pirate Enlightenment
