= Temporary Autonomous Zone =

1991 book by Hakim Bey (Peter Lamborn Wilson)

- Author: Hakim Bey
- Publisher: Autonomedia
- Publication date: 1991
- ISBN: 978-0936756769

T.A.Z.: The Temporary Autonomous Zone is a book by the anarchist writer and poet Hakim Bey (Peter Lamborn Wilson). It was published in 1991 by Autonomedia and in 2011 by Pacific Publishing Studio. It is composed of three sections, "Chaos: The Broadsheets of Ontological Anarchism", "Communiques of the Association for Ontological Anarchy" and "The Temporary Autonomous Zone".

== Themes ==
The book describes the socio-political tactic of creating temporary spaces that elude formal structures of control.

Bey later expanded the concept beyond the "temporary", saying, "We've had to consider the fact that not all existing autonomous zones are 'temporary.' Some are ... more-or-less 'permanent.'" Hence, the concept of the permanent autonomous zone.

The titular section is divided up into the following subsections:

1. Pirate Utopias
2. Waiting for the Revolution
3. The Psychotopology of Everyday Life
4. The Net and the Web
5. "Gone to Croatan"
6. Music as an Organizational Principle
7. The Will To Power as Disappearance
8. Ratholes in the Babylon of Information

The models of the Temporary Autonomous Zone (TAZ) were seen in insurrections worldwide, including Exarcheia, the Zapatista territories, Rojava, and the Capitol Hill Occupied Protest.

== See also ==
- List of books about anarchism
