= Hamahullah bin Muhammad bin Umar =

Shaykh Shekna Ahmeda Hamahullah ben Muhammad ben Seydina Umar (born 1882) was a Sufi Muslim religious leader, born in French Soudan (modern Mali) and died in France after being arrested and sent into exile in 1933 by the colonial government of French West Africa. While not the founder, he was the spiritual leader of a militant reform movement of the powerful Tijaniyyah sufi ṭarīqah (order, path, brotherhood), which has popularly taken his name, as Hamallayya or Hamallism.

== Disciple ==
Hamahullah was the first disciple of a Tijaniyyah reformer and mystic Shaykh Sidi Mohamed Lakhdar Al Tounsi (d. 1909 in Nioro), who along with doctrinal and ritual changes, stressed opposition to hierarchy and downplayed the importance of formal education. Led by Hamahullah, the movement spread in the 1920s in what was then French Soudan, modern Mali. It first took root amongst Wolof traders living in Nioro, but soon spread to servile caste Muslims in Mauretania and Mali.

== Exile ==
Hamahullah bin Muhammad bin Umar was exiled by French authorities from his home in Nioro du Sahel (Mali) to Mauretania in 1933 following clashes between his followers and local leaders, then to Côte d'Ivoire and finally France, but the movement survived his death in exile. The movement was eventually made illegal in French West Africa, but has continued, especially among the rural poor. Hamahullah's most prominent disciples included Tierno Bokar Salif Tall in Mali and Yacouba Sylla in Mauretania, with the movement continuing as a small but prosperous religious faction across contemporary West Africa.
