= A Spirit of Tolerance =

Book by Amadou Hampâté Bâ

A Spirit of Tolerance: The Inspiring Life of Tierno Bokar
- Author: Amadou Hampate Ba
- Original title: 'Vie en enseignement de Tierno Bokar, le sage de Bandiagara'
- Translator: Jane Casewit
- Language: English
- Genre: Biography
- Publisher: World Wisdom
- Publication date: 2008
- Publication place: United States
- Media type: Print (Hardback and Paperback)
- Pages: 260 pages
- ISBN: 978-1-933316-47-5
- OCLC: 172569380
- Dewey Decimal: 297.4092 B 22
- LC Class: BP80.T54 .B313 2008

A Spirit of Tolerance: The Inspiring Life of Tierno Bokar is the English translation of Amadou Hampate Ba's book Vie en enseignement de Tierno Bokar, le sage de Bandiagara (The Life and Education of Tierno Bokar, the Sage of Bandiagara), originally written in French. This book describes the life of Tierno Bokar, a Malian Sufi who preached a message of religious tolerance. It was adapted into a play directed by Peter Brook titled Tierno Bokar.
