= The Strange Destiny of Wangrin =

1973 non-fiction novel by Amadou Hampâté Bâ

- Author: Amadou Hampâté Bâ
- Original title: L'Étrange Destin de Wangrin
- Language: French
- Genre: Novel
- Published: 1978; 1992
- Publication place: Mali
- Pages: 384
- ISBN: 978-2264017581

The Strange Destiny of Wangrin, or The Fortunes of Wangrin, originally published as L'Étrange Destin de Wangrin, is a non-fiction novel written by Malian novelist and scholar Amadou Hampâté Bâ published in 1973.

It narrates the story of Wangari, a friend of Bâ and his experience in colonial Mali.

== Analysis ==
The book has been referred to a historical novel that criticises the bastardisation of African traditions by the West. It won the Grand prix littéraire d'Afrique noire in 1974.
