= Salat al-Fatih =

Regular litany and prayer for Muhammad

Salat al-Fatih, Durood Fatih or Sholawat Fatih
- Author: Muhammad ibn Abi al-Hasan al-Bakri
- Working title: صَلَاةُ الْفَاتِحِ
- Language: Arabic
- Subject: Dhikr, Dua, Wird
- Genre: Wazifa
- Publication place: Morocco

In Sufism, the Salat al-Fatih (Arabic: صَلَاةُ الْفَاتِحِ, "opener's prayer") was transmitted to the Muslims by Sheikh Muhammad ibn Abi al-Hasan al-Bakri, a successor of Abu Bakr al-Siddiq later this is accepted and litany (wird) prayer for Muhammad practiced individually or in congregation by followers (murids) in the Tijaniyya order.

== Presentation ==
Salat al-Fatih is commonly known as Durood Fatih in the Indian subcontinent and Sholawat Fatih in Far East Asia.

This litany was transmitted to Muslims by the Sheikh Muhammad ibn Abi al-Hasan al-Bakri, a descendant of Abu Bakr al-Siddiq.

It is also attributed to Sheikh Ahmad al-Tijani, the founder of the Tijaniyya Sufi order, and this prayer is actually recited by millions of Tijaniyya adherents (murids) across the world as part of their daily wird.

The full text and authentic formula of this litany and prayer for Muhammad is as follows:

Arabic: اللَّهُمَّ صَلِّ عَلَى سَيِّدِنَا مُحَمَّدِ الْفَاتِحِ لِمَا أُغْلِقَ، وَالْخَاتِمِ لِمَا سَبَقَ، نَاصِرِ الْحَقِّ بِالْحَقِّ، الْهَادِي إِلَى صِرَاطِكَ الْمُسْتَقِيمِ، وَعَلَى آلِهِ حَقَّ قَدْرِهِ وَمِقْدَارِهِ الْعَظِيمِ.

English: O Allah, send prayers upon our master Muhammad, the opener of what was closed, and the seal of what had preceded, the helper of the truth by the Truth, and the guide to Your straight path. May Allah send prayers upon his Family according to his greatness and magnificent rank.

— Tariqa Tijaniyya

== See also ==
- Salawat
- Wazifa
- Lazimi
- Dua
- Dhikr
- Wird
- Tijaniyya
