= Wazifa =

Recitation of Quran and Dhikr in Islam

In Sufism, the wazifa (Arabic: وَظِيفَة ; plural: wazaïf) is a regular litany practiced by followers and comprising Quranic verses, hadiths of supplication and various Duas.

== Presentation ==
It is recorded in the various rituals of the Sufis that one of their main invocations takes place with an individual or collective daily and weekly dhikr and wird known as wazifa. This wazifa thus refers only to the part of this ritual devoted to the invocation of the supreme qualities of Allah Almighty.

As an example, song and rhyme also play a key role in this wazifa and provide a bridge and connection to the Sufi practice of reciting the ninety-nine names of God while meditating on their meaning.

For each tariqa in Sufism, there are specific collective litany rules comprising a minimum number of people required to create a group which is generally four murids.

In these reciting congregations, the disciples meet daily or weekly to perform collective dhikr, which is a type of meeting thus known as wazifa circle (halqa).

== Conditions ==
There are several conditions for the collective recitation of the wazifa to bring its mystical fruits:

- The attendance and presence of all the murids accustomed to the ritual;
- The grouping of reciters by forming a circle (halqa);
- Prayer aloud from the oral recitation of all parts of the wazifa;
- Literal and melodic erudition and perfection of reciting dhikr.

In the Tijaniyya order, if the reciters are men and there is no confirmed muqaddam among them, these murids can elect from among themselves a man who can initiate the wazifa for them.

== Time ==
The best time to practice morning wazifa ranges from fajr prayer to duha prayer and can go beyond until noon.

For the evening wazifa, the preferable time is from the asr prayer in the afternoon until the isha prayer at night.

Particularly in the summer when the nights are short, the possible schedule of the nocturnal wazifa can extend from sunset until dawn the next day.

== Practice ==
The practice and performance of wazifa is very developed and rigorous among the faithful and murids in the tariqas of Sufism.

This litany is assigned as a daily or weekly duty to the disciple by his Sheikh and designed for him according to his predispositions and capacities for spiritual transcendence.

This duty of recitation generally includes the Shahada and the supreme name Allah or its substitute which is the pronoun Huwa (Arabic: هُوَ).

== See also ==
- Wazifa Zarruqiyya
- Dua
- Dhikr
- Wird
- Lazimi
- Salat al-Fatih
