= Nasrollah Pourjavady =

Iranian philosopher

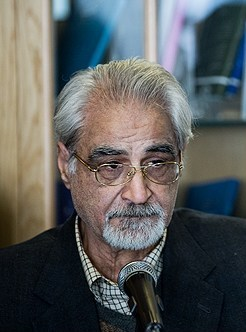
- Born: July 19, 1943 (age 83); Tehran, Iran

Education
- Education: University of California, San Francisco, University of Tehran

Philosophical work
- Era: Contemporary philosophy
- Region: Islamic philosophy
- Main interests: Sufism, Islamic philosophy

Nasrollah Pourjavady (Persian: نصرالله پورجوادی; born 1943) is an Iranian philosopher, Sufi scholar, and a professor of philosophy at the University of Tehran in Tehran, Iran. He is the founder and former head of the Iran University Press and a permanent member of the Academy of Persian Language and Literature.

== Biography ==
Pourjavady was born in Tehran, Iran. He received his master's degree and doctorate in philosophy from the University of Tehran. Pourjavady held academic positions at various institutions including the University of North Carolina at Chapel Hill, Colgate University, and the Gregorian University in Rome. He was awarded the Alexander von Humboldt Prize for Research Excellence in 2005.

== Awards and honors ==
- Persian Literature Award (2004)
- Alexander von Humboldt Award (2005)
- Sai'di Sirjani Book Award (2008)

== Works ==
In English

- Kings of Love: The Poetry and History of the Ni'matullahi Sufi Order (1978)
- Sawānih: Inspirations from the World of Pure Spirits (1986)
- The Drunken Universe: An Anthology of Persian Sufi Poetry with Peter Lamborn Wilson (1999)
- The Light of Sakina in Suhrawardi's Philosophy of Illumination (1999)
- Splendour of Iran (3 Volumes, 2001)
- Abu Abd ar-Rahman as-Sulami Collected Works on Early Sufism. 3-Volumes Set. "Majmo'eh Asare Abu Abdurahman Solmi. Set of 3-vols." (ed) (2010)

In Persian

- Eshrāq va ‛erfān (2001)
- Zaban-e hal: dar erfan adabiyat-e parsi (Tehran, 1385sh/2006)
- Do mojadded (2002)

In French

- La vision de Dieu en theologie et mystique musulmane (1996)
