= Ahmad At Tijânî Ibn Bâba Al 'Alawî =

Mauritanian poet

Personal life
- Born: Ahmad At Tijânî Ibn Bâba Al 'Alawî Chinguit, Mauritania
- Died: 1888 Medina, Saudi Arabia
- Notable works: Munyat Ul Murid; Poems about the wives of Muhammad
- Known for: His work on the Tariqah Tijaniyyah and his poetry
- Occupation: Maliki jurist, theologian, Tijani imam

Religious life
- Religion: Islam

Shaykh Ahmad At Tijânî Ibn Bâba Al 'Alawî (date of birth unknown - 1888) was a Maliki jurist of the city of Chinguit in Mauritania, an Ash'ari theologian and Tijani imam. He is frequently called Ibn Ahmad Baba.

He was the author of many poems including his famous book on the Tariqah Tijaniyyah entitled Munyat Ul Murid, which was later commented on by Shaykh Mohammed Larbi Sayeh, and a beautiful poem about the wives of Muhammad.

He died in Medina in 1888 and is buried in Al Baqi cemetery located next to the Al-Masjid an-Nabawi.
