= Lazimi =

Litany in Islamic Sufism

In Sufism, the lazimi or wird lazim (Arabic: الْوِرْدُ اللَّازِمُ ; obligatory litany) is a regular litany (wird) practiced individually by followers (murids) in the Tijaniyya order.

== Presentation ==
The Sufi members of the Tijaniyyah order distinguish themselves by a number of practices relating to their spiritual life and their mystical process and itinerary.

During the initiation rite to the tariqa order, one murid receives the Tijānī wird, also called lazimi, from a muqaddam or a sheikh representative of the Sunni order.

The muqaddam introduces the initiate (murid) to the obligations of order, which include the duty to pronounce and recite the wird lazimi which is a process that generally takes ten to fifteen minutes each morning after Fajr prayer and afternoon after Asr prayer.

This ritual is due to the fact that the brotherhood of the Tijaniyya sees in the Ibadates as a prerequisite for zuhd (asceticism) which then leads to true and correct faith (Iman).

It is thus that the lazimi fits into this perception of the Tijaniyya on the faith (Iman), and that the faithful members of this Sufi order must agree to recite three obligations of worship: the Lazimi, the Wazifa and the Dhikr Jumu'a (Arabic: ذِكْرُ الْجُمُعَةِ).

Therefore, rigorous attendance at lazimi is the sign of the righteousness (Istiqama) of the murid through which he tries to copy and imitate the mystical ways of Muhammad and his Sahaba companions.

== Practice ==
The daily practice of reciting lazimi, which has a mandatory ritual aspect, involves the repetition of specific liturgies having mystical fruits on the qalb of the murid.

The lazimi is an individual formula of supplication which includes repetitions of:

- Istighfar: "'Astaghfiru Llāh' '" ("I ask God for forgiveness"), 100 times.
- Prayer for Muhammad called the “Salat al-Fatih” (opener's prayer), 100 times.
- Shahada: “ Lā 'ilāha' illa Llāh ” (“There is no God but Allah”), 100 times.

Murids are also to participate collectively in wazifa, which is a litany formula similar to lazimi which is recited and sung in groups, often in a mosque, or zawiya on a daily or weekly basis.

== See also ==
- Salat al-Fatih
- Dua
- Dhikr
- Iman in Islam
- Istiqama
