= Kiota =

Village in Niger

Coordinates: 13°16′N 2°57′E

- Commune and village
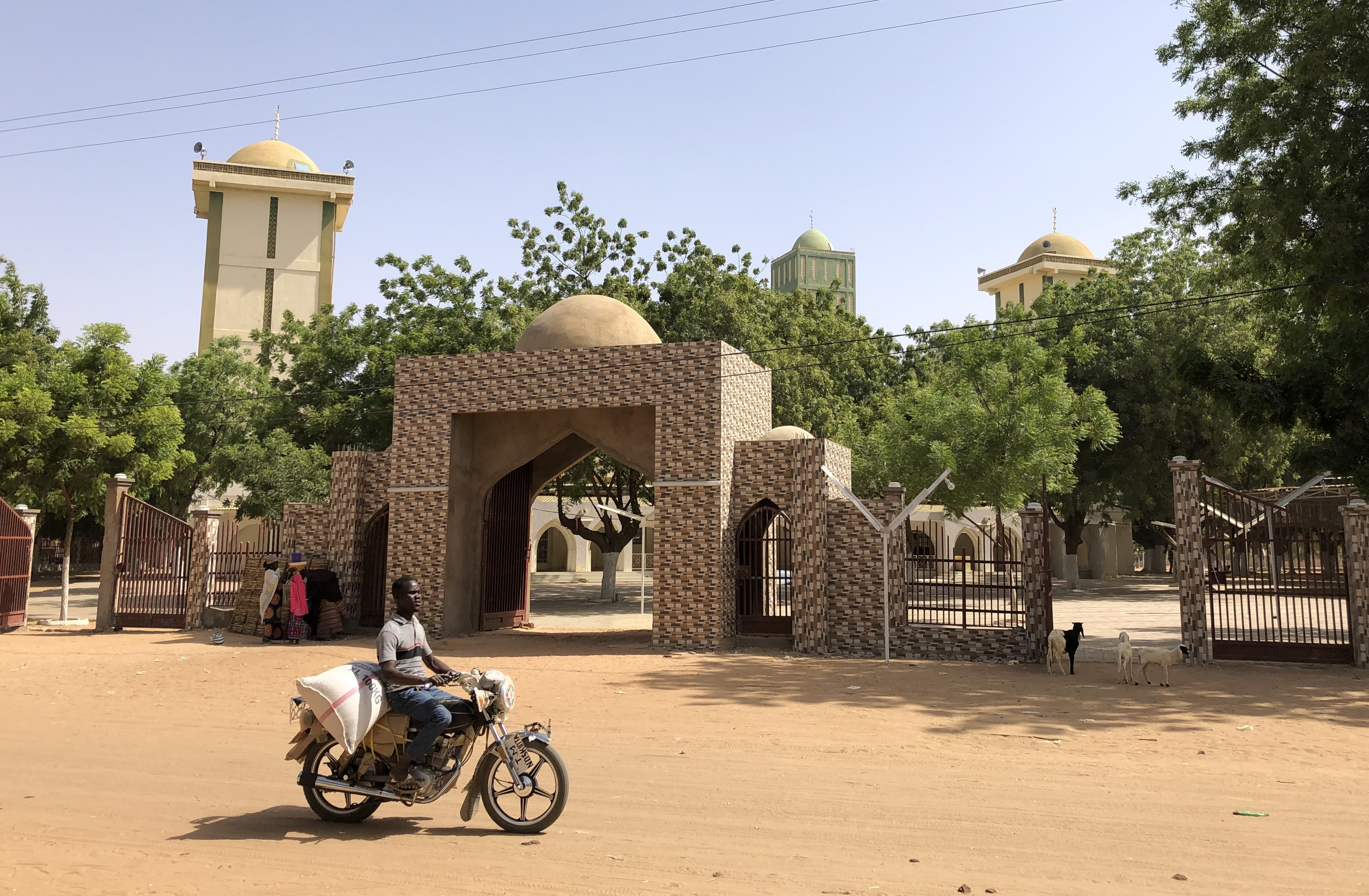
- Main street in front of the Grand mosque
- Interactive map of Kiota
- Country: Niger

Area
  - Total: 68.6 sq mi (177.7 km^{2})

Population (2012 census)
  - Total: 25,282
  - Density: 368.5/sq mi (142.3/km^{2})
- Time zone: UTC+1 (WAT)

Kiota is a small town and rural commune in Niger in the Boboye Department, Dosso Region. As of 2012, it had a population of 25,282.
It is the seat of the most important Tijaniyyah community (a Sufi order) in Niger.
The weekly market is on Fridays.

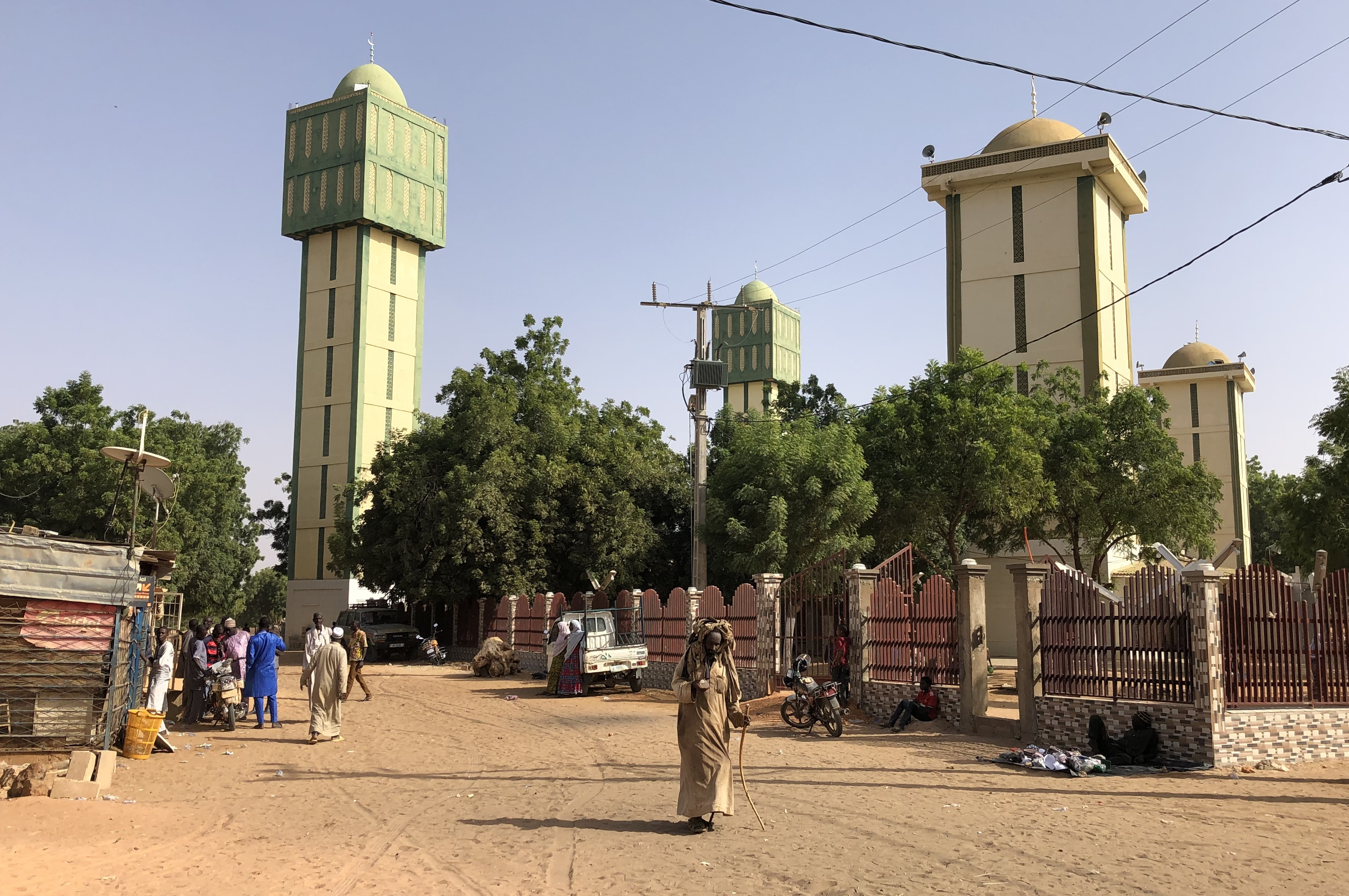
The grand mosque of Kiota

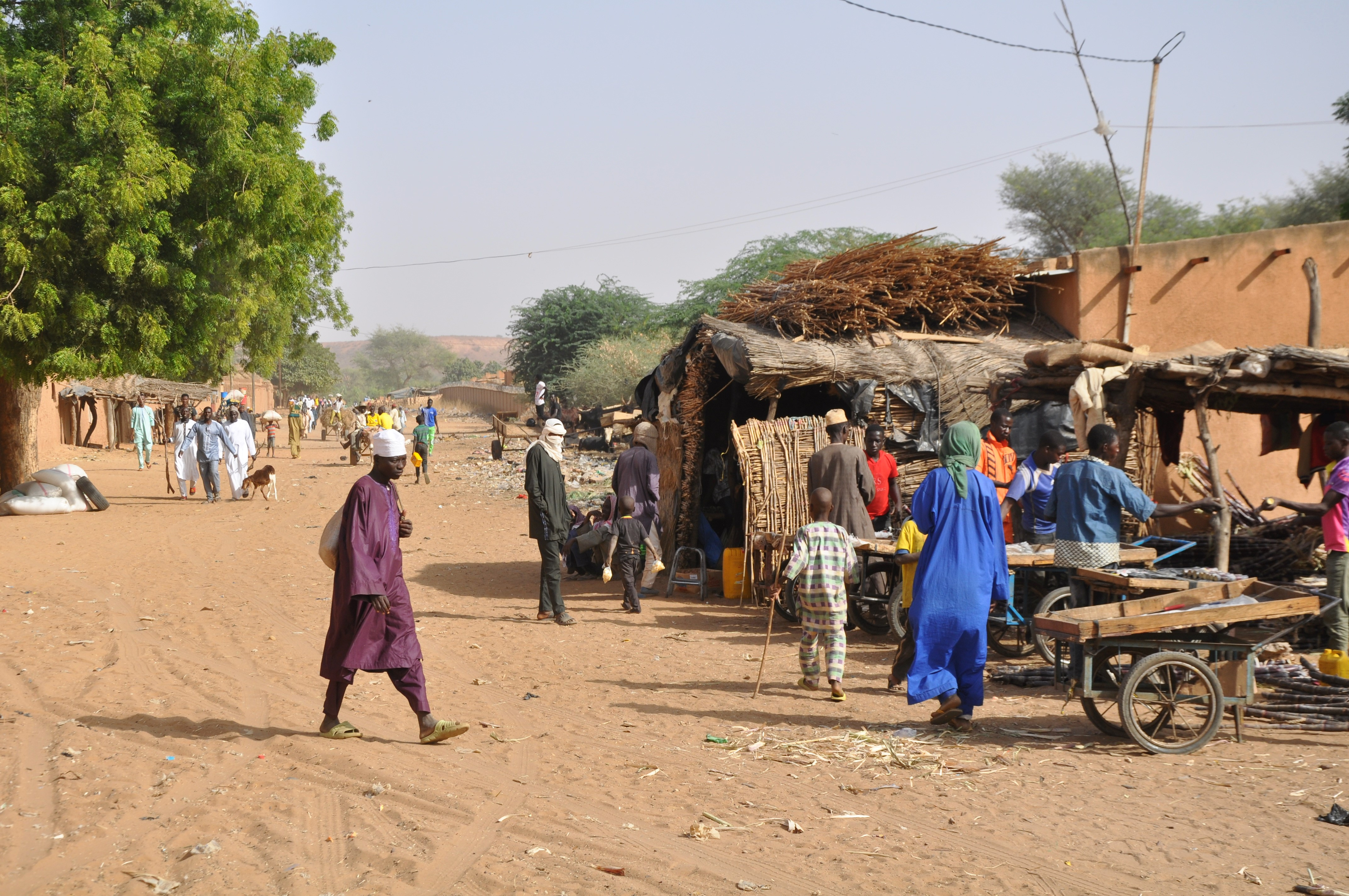
Street scene in Kiota
