= Bill Weinberg =

American writer (born 1962)

William J. Weinberg (born March 19, 1962) is an American political writer and radio personality based in New York City. He writes journalism focusing on the struggles of indigenous peoples, largely in Latin America, but he has also written on the Middle East and local New York issues. He is the co-editor of the on-line journal CounterVortex. The CounterVortex Family of Websites also includes Global Ganja Report. For twenty years he was the primary producer of a weekly late-night radio show on WBAI in New York called The Moorish Orthodox Radio Crusade (founded in 1988 by Peter Lamborn Wilson, who is also known as Hakim Bey). A number of recordings of episodes airing between 1992 and 2011 have been archived at the Oral History Archives at Columbia University. He has won three awards from the Native American Journalists Association. His basic political orientation is left-anarchist.

His work has appeared in publications such as The Nation, Al Jazeera, New America Media, Newsday, The Village Voice, Middle East Policy, In These Times, The Ecologist, Earth Island Journal, NACLA Report on the Americas and his own CounterVortex.

Bill Weinberg is a co-founder of National Organization for the Iraqi Freedom Struggles.

== Publications ==
=== Books ===
==== Authored ====
- Homage to Chiapas: The New Indigenous Struggles in Mexico. Verso. 2002. ISBN 1-85984-372-7. "…a comprehensive account of the Zapatista rebellion from the uprising of January 1, 1994"
- War on the Land: Ecology and Politics in Central America. Zed Books. 1991. ISBN 0-86232-947-7.

==== Edited ====
- Avant Gardening: Ecological Struggle in the City and the World. Autonomedia. 1999. (co-edited with Peter Lamborn Wilson).

=== Articles ===
- Weinberg, Bill (November 2, 2009). "Peru: Hunt Oil Contract to Reignite Amazon Uprising?". North American Congress on Latin America.
- Weinberg, Bill (September 7, 2009). "Peru: veteran guerilla fighter Hugo Blanco speaks on Amazon struggle". CounterVortex.
- Weinberg, Bill (July 29, 2008). "Colombia's Heart of Darkness in NYC—and DC". The Nation. "Colombian paramilitary commander Diego "Don Berna" Fernando Murillo—ex-boss of Medellín's feared Cacique Nutibara Bloc—was arraigned in federal court in Manhattan last month on cocaine charges that could land him in prison for thirty years."
- Weinberg, Bill (December 24, 2007). "Iraq's Civil Resistance". The Nation.
- Weinberg, Bill (November 7, 2006). "Crisis in Oaxaca: What You Need to Know". The Village Voice. Archived from the original on July 24, 2009.
- Weinberg, Bill (September 1, 2006). "9–11 and the New Pearl Harbor". CounterVortex.

=== Radio shows ===
- The Struggle in Peru II 29 September 2009, Bill Weinberg with a travelogue and update on the indigenous struggle in Peru.
- Critical Mass Under Attack V July 29, 2008, Bill Times Up on the latest escalation against Critical Mass.
- The Tompkins Square Riot: 20 Years Later 22 July 2008, Chris Flash, editor of the Lower East Side underground paper The Shadow, and Frank Morales, co-editor of the anthology Police State America.
- From Darfur to Mauritania 19 September 2006, Mamadou Barry and Abdarahmane Wone of the African Liberation Forces of Mauritania (FLAM)
- Anti-Zionism & Jewish Liberation Ella Goldman, Guy Izhak Austrian, Ora Wise and Nirit Ben-Ali of Jews Against the Occupation (JATO) February 4,11 2003
