= Sultan Rafi Sharif Bey =

American religious leader

Rafi Sharif
- Born: February 28, 1940
- Died: March 2, 2006 (aged 66); Baltimore, Maryland
- Spouse(s): Aisha (-2004); Marian (1991–2005)

Rafi Yahya Abdullah Sharif-Bey (February 28, 1940 – March 2, 2006) was a pioneer in the development of Islamic culture in the United States. He was a co-founder of the Sufi group The Noble Order of Moorish Sufis, the head Mufti of Moorish Science Temple #13 in Baltimore, and involved in the Ahmadiyyah movement.

== Biography ==
Born Yale Jean Singer to an Orthodox Jewish family, Sharif attended the military prep school Staunton Military Academy, where he was a drummer in the Regimental Band and graduated in 1958. He converted to Islam and took on the name Rafi Sharif in the late 1950s.

Sharif married his first wife, Aisha (née Barbara Volk) Sharif, then the National Secretary of The Noble Order of Moorish Sufis (which would later grow into the Moorish Orthodox Church of America), at a mosque in Sacramento, California. They lived in California for some time to spread awareness of the Moorish Science Temple of America. By 1966, the couple and their sons Tariq (b. 1966) and Yasin (b. 1962) were living in the Williamsburg neighborhood of Brooklyn. They subsequently had two daughters. Aisha Sharif passed on in 2004.

Sharif served in the US Marine Corps during the Vietnam War and was later a recruiter for the Army National Guard, holding the rank of Sergeant first class. He served as a Scouting executive and as a senior officer in the Sea Scouts, where he was known as the most prolific producer of private issue square knots.

He wed the former Marian Yasenchak Bey, on July 15, 1991 in Baltimore's Leakin Park and the family settled in the Baltimore neighborhood of Windsor Hills. Their daughter Anya was born in 1993.

A Star Trek fan, he began a local chapter of the Starfleet Marines (SMI), the MSB Tawara, in the mid-1990s and was the SMI Quartermaster at the time of his death.

=== Liver and kidney transplants ===
Sharif had hepatitis C and received two liver transplants by 2005, when he learned that his kidneys were also failing him. The University of Maryland Medical Center found a matching kidney for him on June 30, 2005 and he and his wife were waiting at the hospital when Marian Sharif suffered a stroke and died. Her kidney was a better match than the one Rafi Sharif had been waiting to receive and he received one of his late wife's kidneys within 26 hours of her death.

=== Death and afterward ===
A week before his death, his liver began to fail and he was rushed to the hospital. Doctors quickly determined that there was nothing else to be done and that his death was imminent. He slipped into a coma and died the morning of March 2, 2006.

The janazah (Islamic funeral) was held March 5, 2006 in Sykesville, MD, followed by an open memorial service. The American Legion held a moving memorial ceremony, as did the local Masonic lodge (Rafi was a 32nd degree). A representative of the Boy Scouts of America also paid tribute to Rafi, who was a major volunteer and senior executive for the Scouts, a senior officer in the Sea Explorers, B.S.A., and was awarded a 50-year pin from the Boy Scouts.

Sharif is buried in Garrison Forest Veterans Cemetery in Owings Mills, Maryland.

== Philosophical and/or political views ==
Sharif converted to Islam in the late 1950s. After his conversion, he became actively involved in the Moorish Science Temple of America – the forerunner to the Nation of Islam – and then the Ahmadiyya Muslim Community. He co-founded The Noble Order of Moorish Sufis in July 1957. In the late 1980s, he renounced the teachings of the Ahmadiyya Muslim Community and joined the Lahore Ahmadiyya Movement.

He worked with mainstream Sunni Muslims—members of his local Naqshbandi tariqah attended his janazah – and was a lifelong student of Sufism, spending time as a member of the Chisti and Nimatullahi Sufi orders as well. In the last few years before his death, he was investigating the historical links that he believed to exist between the Lithuanian Karaite Jews from which he was descended and Islamic culture.

Sharif political views were Anarcho-Syndicalist, and he held long time membership with the Industrial Workers of the World and the Workers Solidarity Alliance.
