= Warren Tartaglia =

American musician, poet, and cofounder of Moorish Orthodox Church of America

- Born: March 13, 1944; Mt. Vernon, New York, United States
- Died: November 1965
- Genres: Jazz
- Occupations: Musician; poet
- Instrument: Alto saxophone

Warren Tartaglia (also known as Walid al-Taha) (March 13, 1944 – November 1965) was an American jazz musician, poet and one of the six founders of the Moorish Orthodox Church of America. He died at age 21 of a heroin overdose.

== Biography ==
He was born March 13, 1944, as Warren Tartaglia in Mt. Vernon, New York. His maternal grandfather, Harry Frank, was the first son of a rabbi and his maternal grandmother was Ida Frank. Ida and Harry Frank were the parents of Ruth. Ruth married Warren's father Vincent Tartaglia, and became Ruth Frank Tartaglia. She almost died from post-partum bleeding at his birth and was in the hospital for a month, too sick to care for him, while Warren was in an incubator, for almost a month.

Tartaglia graduated from Mt. Vernon's A.B. Davis High School where he was friends with Mike Maggid Bey and other future MOC founders. His friend Mike Maggid was the official photographer for the Noble Order of Moorish Sufis.

When he enrolled at N.Y.U. (Washington Square), Tartaglia ran a temple there and became the head of Orissa Province (New York State). His friend Ghulam El Fatah, a.k.a. Gregory M. Foster, would head Temple #14 in Newark, N.J., and be Governor of Behar Province (New Jersey). Tartaglia was also responsible for the chartering of Noble Order Temples 7, 22, and 23. Later, in 1965, some initiates of those temples would start the Moorish Orthodox Church at Columbia University.

The Sultan Rafi Sharif Bey, brought him into the Noble Order of Moorish Sufis in Baltimore in 1959 after being introduced by a mutual friend and Noble Order member — his cousin's friend Jane Raquel Jacobs (Yacoubi El). Tartaglia was 15 or 16 at this point and learned about Hassan Sabah and the Hashshasheen Ismaili Dervish Order. Like the Bey and Bey's father, Tartaglia was a jazz musician and shared interests in worker rights.

Tartaglia was an alto saxophone player, a poet, and an artist. He played with musicians such as Yusuf Lateef, Art Blakey, Jim Green, Freddie Mitchell, and Pony Poindexter. Art Blakey's son and his daughter-in-law would join the Noble Order Moors.

Tartaglia would often travel from Mt. Vernon, New York, to Baltimore to visit his mother's relatives (his aunt Ralene Frank Wasserman and her daughter, his cousin Randi) and Bey. Tartaglia became a Noble Order Moor and rose quickly in the ranks of the Noble Order of Moorish Sufis, was given a Moorish name (Walid al-Taha) and title, and the honor of heading the second Noble Order Temple.

al-Taha brought the NOMS and the MOC to the larger world as a preacher and a radio talk-show host on WBAI. During his time there in 1965 he also read some of his poems on air and five were published posthumously in the collection Destruction of Baltimore. Al Fowler, Ed Sanders, Ghulam El Fattah (Gregory M. Foster), Barbara Holland, and Harry Fainlight read their works over the airwaves on his show.

His The Hundred Seeds of Beirut was republished by the Chicago-based Magribine Press in 2006 with additional previously unpublished works (poetry and letters) written by Warren. Most of his published poems can be found in the single-issue journal Destruction of Philadelphia.

In November 1965, he collapsed into a coma in a NYC city park, was handcuffed, and was taken to a hospital where he died ten days later. Today he is memorialized by having NOTMS Temple #2 named Walid al-Taha Memorial Temple. An obituary was published in the New York Times on November 18, 1965.
