= Thom Metzger =

American writer

Thom Metzger (born September 2, 1956) is an American writer, musician, and historian. The author of both fiction and non-fiction, he is best known for his exploration of the esoteric and little known history of the Burned Over District of western New York State. As Leander Watts, he has published five YA novels.

Metzger was born and raised in Rochester, New York, son of Robert G. and Lois M. (née Mercel) Metzger.

He attended Gates-Chili High School before earning a BA (1978) and MLS (1979) at the State University of New York at Geneseo, where he studied four-dimensional geometry and quantum physics with Rudy Rucker.

== Career ==
Metzger's writing career began with the publication of the avant-shock novel Big Gurl in 1989. His association with Autonomedia commenced with inclusion of his work in the Semiotext(e) U.S.A. issue, at the invitation of Peter Lamborn Wilson. His work appeared in Anarchy: A Journal of Desire Armed and other journals. Blood and Volts: Edison, Tesla, and the Electric Chair, and This is Your Final Warning were also published by Autonomedia.

By direct transmission from Hakim Bey, Metzger was authorized to found the Ziggurat Lodge of the Moorish Orthodox Church in 1993. During the 1990s, when the subculture of zines flourished, he edited nine issues of The Moorish Science Monitor.

From 1999 until 2005, Metzger published over a hundred feature articles in Rochester’s City Newspaper as well as 55 installments of his Way Below Radar column. He has been called “The Poet Laureate of the Burned Over District,” by The Poet’s Press. As such, he was a featured speaker in the BBC-4 documentary “Secret History: the Chair” and will be featured in the forthcoming documentary Burned Over, produced by East Bend Films.

== Performance ==
Metzger has been a founding member of various avant garde musical groups, among them: Health and Beauty, the Fabulous Rectotem, Ziggurat Prison Ministries, and the Badenovs. Since 1999, he has been an active participant in the subculture of Sacred Harp singing.

== Bibliography ==
=== Novels ===
- Big Gurl (Penguin 1989)
- Shock Totem (Penguin 1990)
- Drowning in Fire (Penguin 1992)
- Stonecutter (Houghton Mifflin Harcourt 2002)
- Wild Ride to Heaven (Houghton Mifflin Harcourt 2003)
- Ten Thousand Charms (Houghton Mifflin Harcourt 2005)
- Beautiful City of the Dead (Houghton Mifflin Harcourt 2006)
- Hydrogen, Sleep and Speed (The Poet's Press 2011)
- Meet Me in the Strange (Meerkat Press 2018)
- Flaherty’s Wake: Abortionist, Boxer, Lawyer, and Priest (Ziggurat 2023)

=== Short Fiction Collection ===
- This is Your Final Warning (Autonomedia 1992)

=== Non-Fiction ===
- Blood and Volts: Edison, Tesla and the Electric Chair (Autonomedia 1996, Underworld Amusements 2024)
- The Birth of Heroin and the Demonization of the Dope Fiend (Loompanics Unlimited 1998)
- Select Strange and Sacred Sites (Exit 18 Books 2002)
- Undercover Mormon: a Spy in the House of the Gods (Roadswell Editions 2012)
- Big Noise on the Astral Plane (Ziggurat 2021)
- Hakim Bey: Real and Unreal (mogtus-sanlux 2023)
- Strong Songs of the Dead: The Pagan Rites of Sacred Harp (Underworld Amusements 2024)
