= Tierno Bokar =

Malian mystic (1875–1940)

Tierno Bokar (Fula: Cerno Bokar, lit. 'Master Bokar' (Note: An honorific title meaning "master" (Fula: cerno).)), full name Tierno Bokar Saalif Tall (1875 – 1940), was a Malian Sufi mystic and a Muslim spiritual teacher of the early twentieth century famous for his message of religious tolerance and universal love.

== Life ==
Tierno Bokar was born in Ségou, Mali, in 1875. Bokar was the son of Salif, a Tukolor prince, and Aissata. His grandfather, Seydou Hann, was respected as a great Sufi mystic. As a child, Bokar was educated in the Tijani order. By the age of 15, Tierno had memorized most of the Quran, Islamic rituals and laws, and the lives of many saints. In 1890, Bokar's father left his family in Ségou to continue to fight against the French as Ségou fell into French hands without resistance. Bokar moved with his mother to the village of Bandiagara in 1893. At the age of 18, he studied under Amadou Tafsir Ba, who introduced him to the secrets of the thought of the Tijani founder, Shaykh Ahmad al-Tijani. After completing his education, Ba requested that Bokar take over his school, but Bokar refused to be anything more than Ba's assistant until Ba died. At the age of 26, he married Nene Amadou Thiam. When he was 33, his teacher passed, and he became the leader of his school.

== Daily Schedule ==
Tierno Bokar led his school for 29 years and, during its heyday, taught almost 200 students. He kept a simple schedule so repetitive that it could be known where he was at any time of the day. He woke up every morning at 3 am and prayed until dawn. At dawn, he would go from hut to hut, calling the people to Fajr prayer. Tierno Bokar did not lead the prayer but would mingle afterwards with those who had attended. After the prayer, he meditated and headed home to eat breakfast with his students. The students would then be separated by their levels of learning in the courtyard, and the lessons would begin. The morning would be dedicated to the Koran first, after which the law and commentaries would be studied until the second meal and Zuhr prayer of the day. After the second prayer, teaching would continue until the mid-afternoon prayer (Asr prayer), after which the students were dismissed to handle their own business. Tierno recited his rosary until the Maghrib prayer at the mosque, where he would remain until the Isha prayer. After that, he would visit his friends and family for enjoyment and social interaction until it was time for sleep.

== Persecution and Death ==
In 1937, Tierno Bokar visited and became a follower of Hamahullah bin Muhammad bin Umar in Nioro du Sahel.

A disagreement over the proper number of repetitions for a Hamallayya Sufi prayer rose dramatically in scale. The difference in repetitions held little to no religious significance but, due to historical factors, was associated with rival clans. Intense infighting among rival clans and religious factions in French Sudan, as well as the involvement of the French colonial authority, eventually led to massacres and the exile of Hammallah. Tierno Bokar followed 11 repetitions in his prayer for religious reasons. Many members of his clan viewed it as a profound betrayal due to the prayer associated with a rival clan. In Bandiagara, Bokar was ostracized by his clan and family and forbidden to teach or pray publicly. Bokar's school was destroyed, and he and his two wives and children were placed under house arrest.

Bokar died in Bandiagara on 19 February 1940, where he is buried in the cemetery "at his mother's feet, under a small tree".

== Religious Teaching ==
=== The Soul ===
Tierno Bokar describes the Primordial Pact between the soul and God. Bokar taught that each person was created in the image of Adam and was given a soul. The soul is the most precious gift that God bestows. It is the soul that separates humans from animals. It is the soul that allows us to make connections and understand religion and the world mentally. It is also the soul that will enable us to understand the Quran, the Sunnah and ijma. Those who dedicated their soul to the religion are promised an increase and a reward in Jannah. Those who dedicate their soul to the material world will bring great harm to themselves in the Hereafter (Jahannam).

Bokar taught that no matter how rigorous the trials around Paradise are, the torments of hell are worse. No matter how pleasurable things around Hell are, paradise is better. Therefore, undergoing a momentary trial for eternal bliss is better than enjoying momentary bliss and suffering perpetual torment.

=== Religious tolerance ===
Bokar believed there was only one true religion with unchangeable principles but varying expressions corresponding to the time and place in which the religion was revealed. Bokar stated that the great prophets teach this Religion, but most people only understand the outward forms of the religion, thus leading separate "religions" to conflict with each other. To explain this concept, Bokar cited several Quranic verses (al-Baqara 2:136, 2:62 and al-Rum 30:30).

Tierno Bokar advocated for civil inter-religious dialogue (al-Nahl 16:125, al-Ankabut 29:46) and admonished religious bigotry or chauvinism. He stated, "Certain truths only seem to be beyond our acceptance because, quite simply, our knowledge has not had access to them." He also advised his students to "Avoid confrontations. When something in some religion or belief shocks you, instead seek to understand it. Perhaps God will come to your aid and will enlighten you about what seems strange to you."

Throughout the increasingly violent fighting, Bokar preached a message of religious tolerance and universal love.

I pray God that at the moment I die, I have more enemies to whom I've done nothing than friends."

— Tierno Bokar

The only struggle that really concerns me is the one that is aimed at our weaknesses. This struggle, alas, has nothing to do with the war that so many of Adam's sons wage in the name of a God they claim to love deeply…

— Tierno Bokar

== Fame ==
- A book written by a pupil of his, Amadou Hampâté Bâ, entitled Vie et enseignement de Tierno Bokar: Le sage de Bandiagara, translated into English as A Spirit of Tolerance, introduced Bokar to the non-African world. The book was originally published in 1957 as Tierno Bokar: Le Sage de Bandiagara with co-author Marcel Cardaire.
- Bokar's life story was later made into a play directed by Peter Brook entitled Tierno Bokar.
- Brook made the story of prayer repetitions into another play, entitled 11 & 12, which ran at the Barbican Centre (London) in early 2010.
- The poet Maabal described Bokar with the following poem:

A constant smile which calls you

A forehead shining like a mirror
A mirror stamped

With the dark point of prostration.

- Composer Wadada Leo Smith titled the first movement of his String Quartet No. 11 (1975-2019) after Bokar.

== See also ==
- Amadou Hampâté Bâ
- List of Sufis
