= Nancy Goldring =

American artist

- Born: Nancy Deborah Goldring; January 25, 1945 (age 81); Oak Ridge, Tennessee
- Known for: Drawing, Photography, Projection

Nancy Goldring (born 1945) is an American artist. Her art practice combines graphic, photographic, and projected material, presented as a non-narrative series of images that she calls "foto-projections." Goldring currently lives and works in New York City, and is a professor emerita, Montclair State University.

== Early life and education ==
Goldring grew up in University City, Missouri. She was educated at University City High School, received a BA in Art History at Smith College, and an MA in Fine Art at NYU. She received her first Fulbright Grant to Italy immediately following Smith College.

== Work ==
While a graduate student, she was a co-founder of Sculpture in the Environment (SITE), an organization of artists dedicated to developing public art projects. After leaving SITE she began developing her own work, and continued to write about public sculpture. Together with architects Michael Webb of Archigram and Giuliano Fiorenzoli she collaborated on an exhibition, Image of the Home at the Institute for Architecture and Urban Studies in New York City.

Goldring's work incorporates drawing, paper models, photography, and slide projection. Photos are layered like collages and eventually flattened into a final image, evocative of layers of archeological excavation. There is a focus on travel and memory and the final pieces are sometimes shown as large slide projection installations.

Her archive is held by the Smithsonian Institution.

In 2020, she produced an exhibition, “Reflessi di Storia,” as a corporate commission for CFT International Headquarters in Parma, Italy. It remains on permanent view.

== Collaborations ==
Nancy Goldring has worked on numerous collaborations including:

- SITE
- Image of the Home with Giuliano Fiorenzoli, and Michael Webb
- Aureola with Juan Downey, Giuliano Fiorenzoli, and Michael Webb
- Stage set design with Ze'Eva Cohen, "Ode"

== Exhibitions ==
Nancy Goldring's work has been shown primarily in the USA, but she has also exhibited in countries such as Italy, India, Japan, Sweden and Czech Republic. A selection of notable individual exhibitions includes:

- Reflessi di Storia CFT Collection, Permanent exhibition, Parma, Italy from Dec. 2019
- Photographic work by Nancy Goldring, Carrie Haddad Gallery, Hudson, New York, Sept-Nov. 2018
- Projections: Place without Description, Devi Art Foundation, Sarai Center for Developing Studies, Delhi, 2012-2013
- Vanishing Points (Punti di Fuga), The Monitor Space, Casa di Architettura, Rome, Apr. 2012; Galleria Martini & Ronchetti, Genoa, Italy, Sept. - Oct. 2013
- Palimpsest, Gallery 138, New York City, Mar. 2006
- Palinsesto, Palazzo Pigorini, Parma, Italy, 2005, catalog with essays by David Levi Strauss
- Legend, Lyman Allen Museum, New London, CT, 2002
- Sites and Sets, Baruch College, New York, 2001
- Distillations, Southeast Museum of Photography, Daytona Beach, FL, 2000
- Foto-Projections, Hampshire College, Amherst, MA, 1993
- Images of Myanmar: Inle Lake and Pagan, Arts for Transit, sponsored by MTA, Grand Central Station, New York, 1992
- Studio on Stromboli, Mississippi Museum of Art, The Open Gallery, Jackson, MS, 1983
- Drawings with Foto-Projections, The Herzliya Museum, The American Cultural Center of Tel Aviv, 1981-1983
- Trepidation of the Spheres: Drawings with Foto-Projections, Camera Club, New York, 1981
- Drawings with Foto-Projections, SOHO 20, New York, 1980
- Nancy Goldring: Drawings, Comfort Gallery, Haverford College, Haverford, PA, 1976

Goldring has also participated in a large number of group exhibitions, including:

- Classical Mythology in Modern and Contemporary Art, William Benton Museum of Art, CT, 2012
- Everywhere/Nowhere, The Spiritual Temperament in Current American Art, Siri Fort Auditorium, New Delhi, India, 2009
- New York New York, Smith College Museum of Art, 2005
- Waking Dreams, University of Virginia Art Museum, Charlottesville, VA, 2004
- Fresh Work 2, Southeast Museum of Photography, Daytona Beach, FL, 1998
- New in the Nineties, Katonah Museum, Katonah, NY, 1996
- Ellis Island: Echoes From a Nation's Past, Aperture Foundation, New York, 1989; Palazzo Cini, Ferrara, Italy, 1993
- Sequence (Con) Sequence, Bard College, Annandale on Hudson, New York, 1989.
- Photography of Invention: Pictures of the Eighties, National Museum of American Art, Washington D.C., 1989
- Photography on the Edge, Haggarty Museum of Art, Milwaukee, WI, 1988

== Collections ==
Goldring's work can be found in more than 30 public collections around the world, including:

- Allen Memorial Museum, Oberlin, Ohio
- Archivio del Comune di Parma, Italy
- Baruch College, New York
- Bibliothèque nationale de France, Paris, France
- Bayley Museum, University of Virginia, Charlottesville, VA
- George Eastman House, Rochester, NY
- Harry Ransom Center for the Humanities, Austin, TX
- Houston Museum of Fine Arts
- International Center of Photography, New York
- International Centre for Photography, Bombay, India
- Padiglione d'Arte Contemporanea, Milan, Italy
- Polaroid Corporation, Westlicht Museum, Vienna, Austria
- Smith College Art Museum, Northampton, Massachusetts
- Southeast Museum of Photography, Daytona Beach FL
- St. Louis Art Museum
- William Benton Museum of Art, Storrs, CT

== Publications ==
- Distillations: Nancy Goldring Drawings and Foto-Projections 1971-2021 (Goff ORO Editions, 2022)
- Shadow’s Shadow: Shadow of a Doubt, Precog Magazine, Volume 6, 2022
- Michael Taussig interview with Nancy Goldring, November Magazine, Volume 1, August 2021
- The Clumsy Ark, (Sprachlichter: 2020)
- Shadows’ Shadows, (Metambesen: 2020)
- School of Nite, Peter Lamborn Wilson and Nancy Goldring (Spuyten Duyvil Press: Jan 2016)
- Putting Yourself in a Place Where Grace can Flow to You, The Brooklyn Rail, Feb 5, 2015
- Occupy: 3 Inquiries into Disobedience, Michael Taussig, Photographs by Nancy Goldring, (Chicago University Press, April 2013)
- Reviews, The Architects Newspaper, 2009-2018
- Nancy Goldring on Walls: Enrichment and Ornamentation Reanimation Library Sep, 2012
- Nancy Goldring: Punti di fuga, altri paesaggi, Nancy Goldring, Paolo Barbaro, Michael Taussig, and Carlo Vannicola (Il Geko Edizioni, 2012)
- On Why Artists Loved Leo Steinberg, The Brooklyn Rail, April 2011
- Palimpsest: fotografie di Nancy Goldring, Nancy Goldring, David Levi Strauss, Paolo Barbaro (Gabriele Mazzotta, 2005)
- Distillations, Nancy Goldring, Alison Divine Nordstrom, and Ellen Handy, (Southeast Museum of Photography, Daytona Beach Community College, 2000)
- Dream Stills, Avant Garde: Journal of Architecture and Aesthetics, University of CO, September 1993
- Imagining Egypt, Avant Garde: Journal of Architecture and Aesthetics, University of CO, July 1991

== Recognition ==
Goldring has been the recipient of awards and grants from such institutions as the Joan Mitchell Foundation, the American Institute of Architecture, New York Foundation for the Arts, New York State Council on the Arts, and the Santa Fe Art Institute. She has received multiple Fulbright Awards to Italy, Sri Lanka, and India, as well as awards from Montclair State University.
