= American Islamic College =

Islamic higher education in Illinois, Chicago, United States

Coordinates: 41.955°N 87.646°W

- Type: Private university
- Established: 1983 (incorporated in 1981; closed, 2004; reopened, 2011)
- President: Timothy J. Gianotti
- Location: Chicago, Illinois, United States
- Campus: 3.3 acres (1.3 ha)
- Website: aicusa.edu

American Islamic College (AIC) is a private Islamic university in Chicago, Illinois. It accepts students from all backgrounds and prepares students for leadership and policy making roles in American society; and for management and staff of American Muslim institutions, and; serving as a resource to American institutions and individuals for learning about Islam. In 2017, it enrolled fewer than 50 students and offered bachelor's and master's degrees in Islamic Studies and master's of Islamic Jurisprudence.

== History ==
AIC was founded in the early 1980s by a coalition of American Muslim leaders in cooperation with colleagues in the Middle East, of which its first president was the Palestinian-American scholar Ismail al-Faruqi. It received support from the Organization of Islamic Cooperation and the Islamic Development Bank.

The current Interim President is Dr. James E. Jones, DMin.
