= Clint Hurtt =

American football coach (born 1978)

Philadelphia Eagles
- Title: Associate head coach, defensive line coach & senior defensive assistant

Personal information
- Born: November 7, 1978 (age 47); The Bronx, New York, U.S.

Career information
- Position: Defensive tackle
- High school: Gates-Chili (Gates, New York)
- College: Miami (FL) (1997-2000)

Career history
- Miami (FL) (2001-2004); (2001-2002) Volunteer strength and conditioning coach; (2003–2004) Graduate assistant; FIU (2005) Defensive line coach; Miami (FL) (2006–2009) Defensive line coach; Louisville (2010–2013) Defensive line coach; Chicago Bears (2014) Assistant defensive line coach; Chicago Bears (2015–2016) Outside linebackers coach; Seattle Seahawks (2017–2021) Assistant head coach & defensive line coach; Seattle Seahawks (2022–2023) Defensive coordinator; Philadelphia Eagles (2024–present); (2024–present) Defensive line coach & senior defensive assistant; (2026–present) Associate head coach, defensive line coach & senior defensive assistant

Awards and highlights
- As an assistant coach: Super Bowl champion (LIX)
- Coaching profile at Pro Football Reference

Clint Hurtt (born November 7, 1978) is an American football coach who is the associate head coach, defensive line coach and senior defensive assistant for the Philadelphia Eagles of the National Football League (NFL). He had previously worked as part of the Chicago Bears coaching staff and served as the defensive coordinator for the Seattle Seahawks.

== Career ==
Hurtt played college football at Miami (FL) and was a three-year letterman (1997,'99-00) before his career ended prior to the 2001 season due to injury. Following his playing career, Hurtt spent thirteen years coaching in college from 2001-2013 serving as a defensive line coach in college at his alma mater Miami (FL), for FIU and Louisville. In 2014, Hurtt was hired by the Chicago Bears as their assistant defensive line coach and a year later as their outside linebacker coach. He was then hired by the Seattle Seahawks where he spent seven seasons with the team first as their assistant head coach and defensive line coach and then from 2022-2023 was promoted to defensive coordinator.Following the 2023 season, Hurtt was not retained by the Seahawks and joined the Philadelphia Eagles coaching staff in 2024 as their the defensive line coach and as senior defensive assistant. The team went on to win Super Bowl LIX over the Kansas City Chiefs that season. In March 2026, Hurtt was promoted to the role of associate head coach for the Eagles, making him second in command under head coach Nick Sirianni, while also still holding his other coaching positions.
