= Tijaniyyah =

Sufi mystic order in Sunni Islam

The Tijjani order (Arabic: الطريقة التجانية, romanized: al-Ṭarīqa al-Tijāniyya) is a Sufi order of Sunni Islam named after Ahmad al-Tijani. It originated in Algeria but is now more widespread in the Maghreb and West Africa, particularly in Senegal, Gambia, Mauritania, Mali, Guinea, Niger, Chad, Ghana, Northern and Southwestern Nigeria and some parts of Sudan. The Tijāniyyah order is also present in the states of Kerala, Tamil Nadu and Karnataka in India. Its adherents are called Tijānī (spelled Tijaan or Tiijaan in Wolof, Tidiane or Tidjane in French). Tijānīs place great importance on culture and education and emphasize the individual adhesion of the disciple (murid). To become a member of the order, one must receive the Tijānī wird, or a sequence of holy phrases to be repeated twice daily, from a muqaddam, or representative of the order.

== History and spread of the order ==
=== Foundation of the order ===
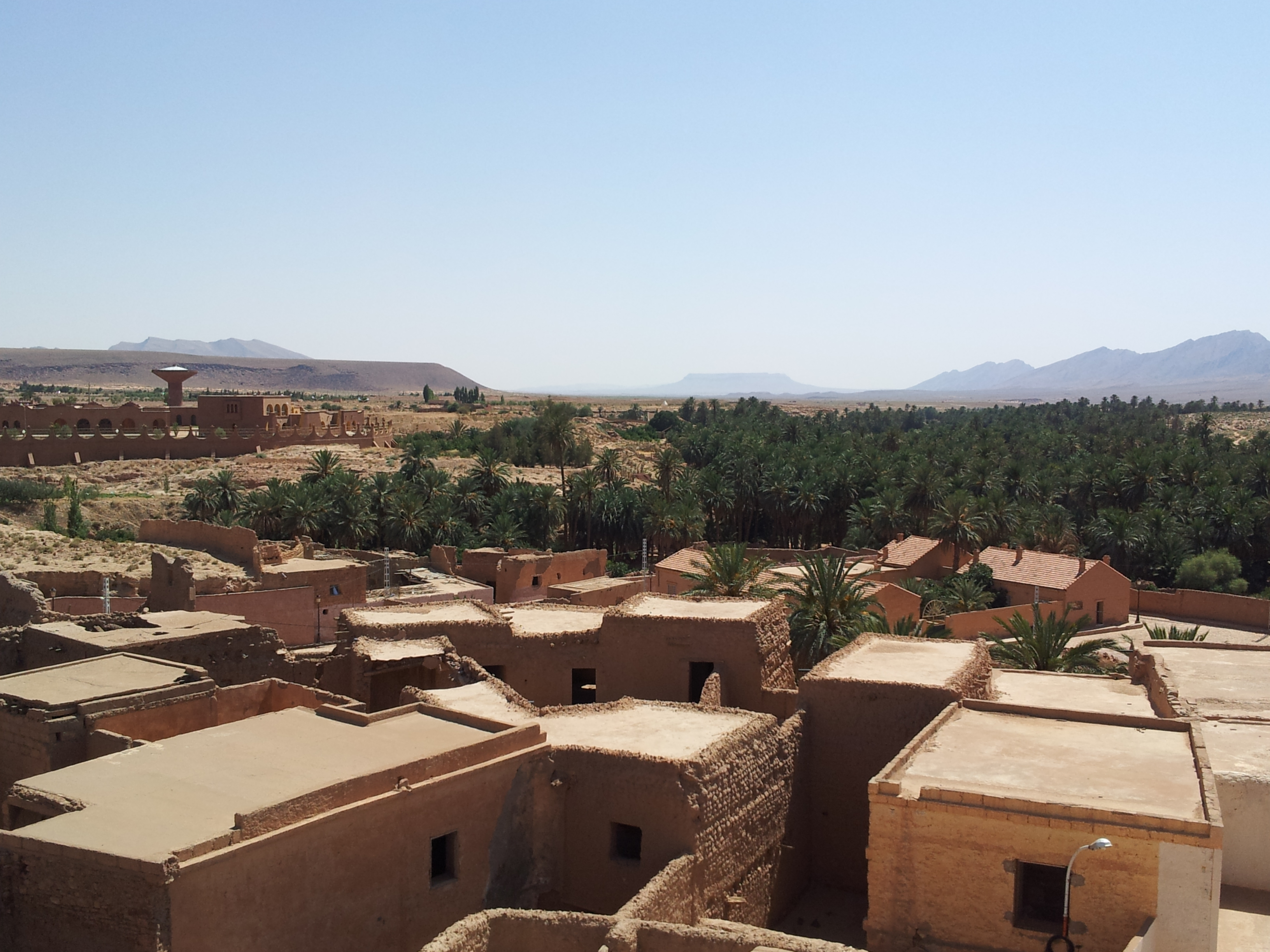
The oasis of Boussemghoun in Algeria, where al-Tijani established his tariqa in 1781

Ahmad al-Tijani (1737–1815) was born in Aïn Madhi in Algeria and died in Fes, Morocco. He received his religious education in Mostaganem, Algeria. Inspired by other saints he founded the Tijānī in order in Boussemghoun in the 1780s; sources vary as to the exact date between 1781 and 1784.

=== Expansion in West Africa ===
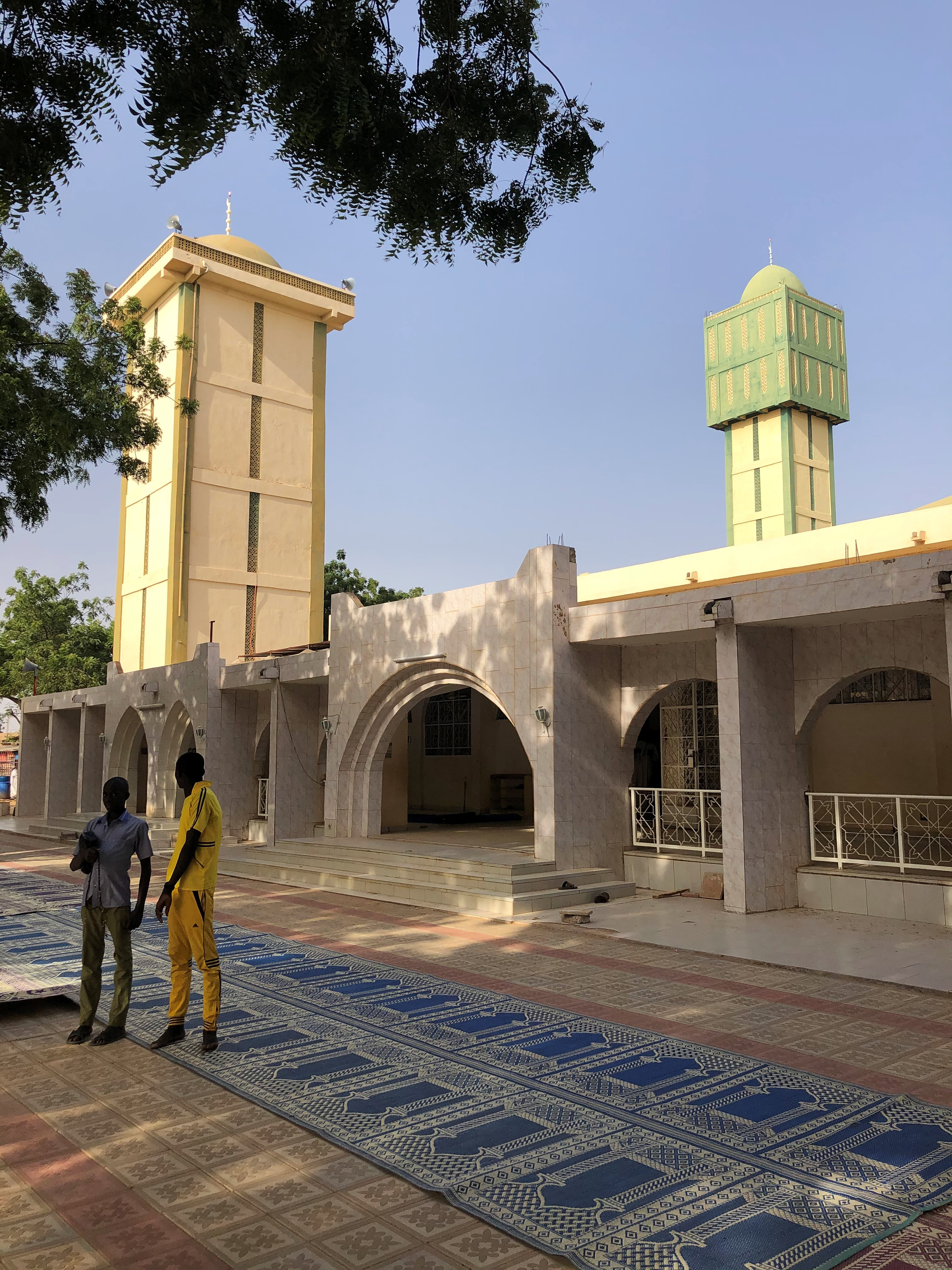
The grand mosque in Kiota is the centre of the Tijaniyyah order in Niger.

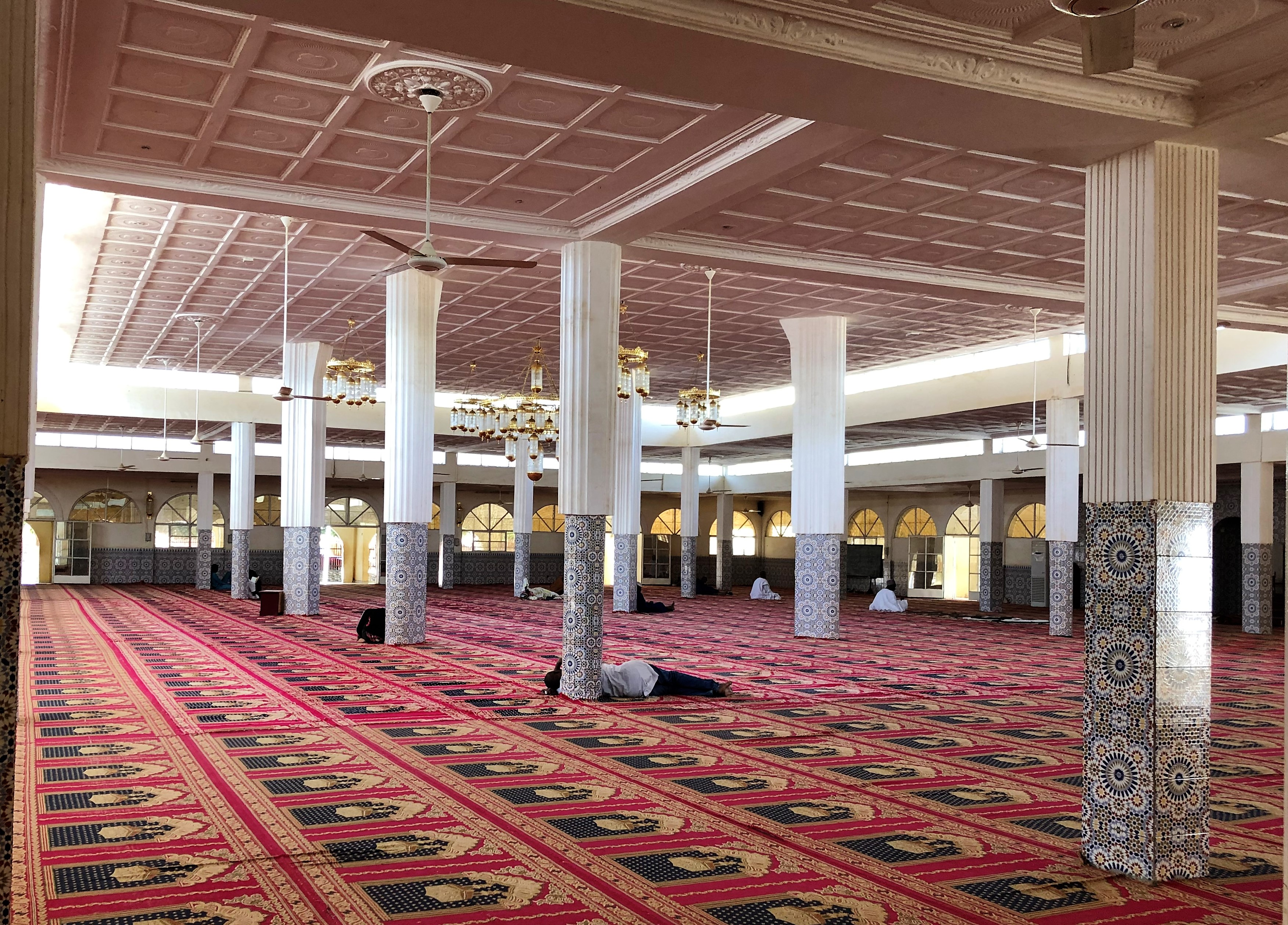
Interior of the grand mosque in Kiota

The order has become the largest Sufi order in West Africa and continues to expand rapidly. It was brought to southern Mauritania around 1789 by Muḥammad al-Ḥāfiẓ of the 'Idaw `Ali tribe, which was known for its many Islamic scholars and leaders and was predominantly Qādirī at the time. Nearly the entire tribe became Tijānī during Muḥammad al-Ḥāfiẓ's lifetime, and the tribe's influence would facilitate the Tijāniyya's rapid expansion to sub-Saharan Africa.

Muḥammad al-Ḥāfiẓ's disciple Sidi Mawlūd Vāl initiated the 19th-century Fulɓe leader Omar Saidou Tall and the Fulɓe cleric ʿAbd al-Karīm al-Nāqil from Futa Jalon (now Guinea) into the order. After receiving instruction from Muḥammad al-Ghālī from 1828 to 1830 in Mecca, Umar Tall was appointed Caliph (successor or head representative) of Aḥmed al-Tijānī for all of the Western Sudan (Western sub-Saharan Africa). Umar Tall then led a holy war against what he saw as corrupt regimes in the area, resulting in the large but fleeting Toucouleur Empire in Eastern Senegal and Mali. While Omar Saidou Tall's political empire soon gave way to French colonialism, the more long-standing result was to spread Islam and the Tijānī Order through much of what is now Senegal, Guinea, and Mali (see Robinson, 1985).

In Senegal's Wolof country, especially the northern regions of Kajoor and the Kingdom of Jolof, the Tijānī Order was spread primarily by Malick Sy, born in 1855 near Dagana. In 1902, he founded a zāwiya or religious center in Tivaouane, which became a center for Islamic education and culture under his leadership. Upon Malick Sy's death in 1922, his son Ababacar Sy became the first Caliph. Serigne Mansour Sy became the present Caliph in 1997, upon the death of Abdoul Aziz Sy. The Mawlid or Gàmmu, the celebration of the birth of Muhammad, of Tivaouane gathers many followers each year. The Order's 2026 Mawlid will be centred around Tawhid (oneness).

The "house" or branch of Tivaouane is not the only branch of the Tijānī order in Senegal. The Tijānī order was spread to the south by another jihadist, Màbba Jaxu Ba, a contemporary of Umar Tall who founded a similar Islamic statelet in Senegal's Saalum area, declaring himself Almamy of Rip and building a series of fortified villages in the 1860s.. After Màbba was defeated and killed in 1867 at The Battle of Fandane-Thiouthioune fighting against the animist state of Maad a Sinig Kumba Ndoffene Famak Joof, his state crumbled but the Tijāniyya remained the predominant Sufi order in the region, and Abdoulaye ā (1840–1922) became the most important representative of the order in the Saalum, having immigrated southward from the Jolof and, after exile in The Gambia due to tensions with the French, returned to establish a zāwiya in the city of Kaolack.

The branch founded by Abdoulaye Niass's son, Ibrahim Niass, in the Kaolack suburb of Medina Baye in 1930, has become by far the largest and most visible Tijānī branch around the world today. Ibrahima Niass's teaching that all disciples, and not only specialists, can attain a direct mystical knowledge of God through tarbiyyah rūhiyyah (mystical education) has struck a chord with millions worldwide. This branch, known as the Tijāniyyah Ibrāhīmiyyah or the Faydah ("Flood"), is most concentrated in Senegal, Nigeria, Ghana, Niger, and Mauritania, and has a growing presence in the United States and Europe. Most Tijānī web sites and international organizations are part of this movement. Ibrahim Niass' late grandson and former imam of Medina Baye, Hassan Cissé, has thousands of American disciples and in 1983 founded a educational and developmental organization, the African American Islamic Institute, in Medina Baye with branches in other parts of the world.

Another Senegalese "house," in Medina-Gounass, Senegal (to the west of the Niokolo Koba park) was created by Mamadou Saidou Ba in 1935. The community maintained limited contact with French colonial authorities and the successor Senegalese state, seeking isolation in attempt to limit cultural intrusion and heretical doctrinal innovation (bid'ah). The Medina-Gounass community leadership moved to Saidou Ba's son after his death, Ahmed Tijan Ba, who maintained the group's relative autonomy from national authorities.

Still another Tijāniyyah branch was founded in Thienaba in 1882, near Thiès by Serigne Amary Ngoné Ndack Seck, a former anti-colonial leader against French encroachment into Senegal. Following his death in 1899, the branch's leadership passed on to his eldest son, Momar Talla Seck.

In Nigeria, Shaykh Muhammad Awwal Otolorin was formally designated by Ibrahim Niass as the muqaddam for Lagos in 1953. Otolorin subsequently contributed to the spread of the Tijāniyyah order throughout Nigeria, including the opening of several zawāyah. In March 2021, the order's Nigerian branch appointed Muhammadu Sanusi II, formerly the Emir of Kano as its new leader. Sanusi's own grandfather had previously led the order and likewise served as an emir of Kano.

The Ḥamāliyya (Ḥamālliyya) branch, founded by Hamahullah bin Muhammad bin Umar, is centered in Nioro, Mali, and is also present in Senegal, Côte d'Ivoire, Burkina Faso, and Niger. One of its most prominent members is the novelist and historian Amadou Hampâté Bâ, who preserved and advocated the teachings of Tierno Bokar Salif Taal (Cerno Bokar Salif Taal), the "Sage of Banjagara".

It was Cherno Muhammadou Jallow, along with Sheikh Oumar Futi Taal, who first received the Tijāniyyah order in the Senegambia region. Cherno Muhammadou waited for the tarikha for over twelve years in Saint Louis Senegal, where Sheikh Oumar Futi Taal sent his student Cherno Abubakr. He (Cherno Muhammadou) started spreading it in the Senegambia region. Through oral history, it is that said he (Cherno Muhammadou) passed it to twelve disciples. These disciples range from Mam Mass Kah of Medina Mass Kah, Abdoulaye Niass of Medin Kaolack, Cherno Alieu, Deme of NDiaye Kunda Senegal, Cherno Alieu, Diallo of Djanet in Kolda, to name a few. Through these disciples the tarikha spread through the Senegambia region and beyond. Most of these disciples today have loads of followers and all of them are doing the Laazim daily. Cherno Muhammadou passed it to his son Cherno Omar, who later passed to his son Cherno Muhammadou. Baba Jallow later went on looking for his grandfather (Cherno Muhammadou Jallow), whom he later found in the Casamance. After discovering his grandfather's grave, Cherno Baba created a community and named it Sobouldeh and started an annual Ziarre, where thousands converge to honor him yearly.

== Practices ==
Members of the Tijānī order distinguish themselves by a number of practices. Upon entering the order, one receives the Tijānī wird from a muqaddam or representative of the order. The muqaddam explains to the initiate the duties of the order, which include keeping the basic tenets of Islam including the five Five Pillars, to honor and respect one's parents, and not to follow another Sufi order in addition to the Tijāniyya. Initiates are to pronounce the Tijānī wird (a process that usually takes ten to fifteen minutes) every morning and afternoon. The wird is a formula that includes repetitions of the shahada, istighfar, and a prayer for Muḥammad called the Salat al-Fatih "Prayer of the Opener". They are also to participate in the wazifah, a similar formula that is chanted as a group, often at a mosque or zāwiya once on a daily basis, as well as in the Haylalat al-Jum'ah, another formula chanted among other disciples on Friday afternoon before the sun down.

Additionally, disciples in many areas organize regular meetings, often on Thursday evenings or before or after Waẓīfa and Hailalat al-Jum'ah to engage in dhikr Allāh, or remembrance of God. In such meetings, poems praising God, Muhammad, Aḥmed at-Tijānī, or another religious leader may be interspersed with the dhikr. Such meetings may involve simple repetition as a group or call-response, in which one or more leaders lead the chant and others repeat or otherwise respond.

Occasionally, a group of disciples, known in Senegal as a daayira, from Arabic dā'irah, or "circle", may organize a religious conference, where they will invite one or more well known speakers or chanters to speak on a given theme, such as the life of Muḥammad or another religious leader, a particular religious obligation such as fasting during Ramadan, or the nature of God.

The most important communal event of the year for most Tijānī groups is the Mawlid, known in Wolof as the Gàmmu (a borrowed term from the ancient Serer religious festival of "Gamo" or "Gamou" of the Serer people, from the Serer term Gamahou or Gamohou), or the celebration of the birth of Muḥammad, which falls on the night of the 12th of the Islamic month of Rabīʿ al-'Awwal (which means the night before the 12th, as Islamic dates start at sundown and not at midnight). Most major Tijānī religious centers organize a large Mawlid event once a year, and hundreds of thousands of disciples attend the largest ones (in Tivaouane, Kaolack, Prang, Kiota, Kano, Fadama, etc.) Throughout the year, local communities organize smaller Mawlid celebrations. These meetings usually go from about midnight until shortly after dawn and include hours of dhikr and poetry chanting and speeches about the life of Muḥammad.

The Nigerian leader Awwal Otolorin wrote a 275-page book on the practices (shurūṭ) of the order, Al-Mafāhīm Al-Tijānīyyah (The Tijānī Concepts), published in 1997. Considered Awwal's magnus opus, the book in particular outlined the Tijānī idea of a proper relationship because a shaykh and murid.

== See also ==
- Sufism
- Wazifa
- Lazimi
- Salat al-Fatih
- List of Sufi orders
- Muslim brotherhoods of Senegal
- Ahmad At Tijânî Ibn Bâba Al 'Alawî
