= Miriam Goldschmidt =

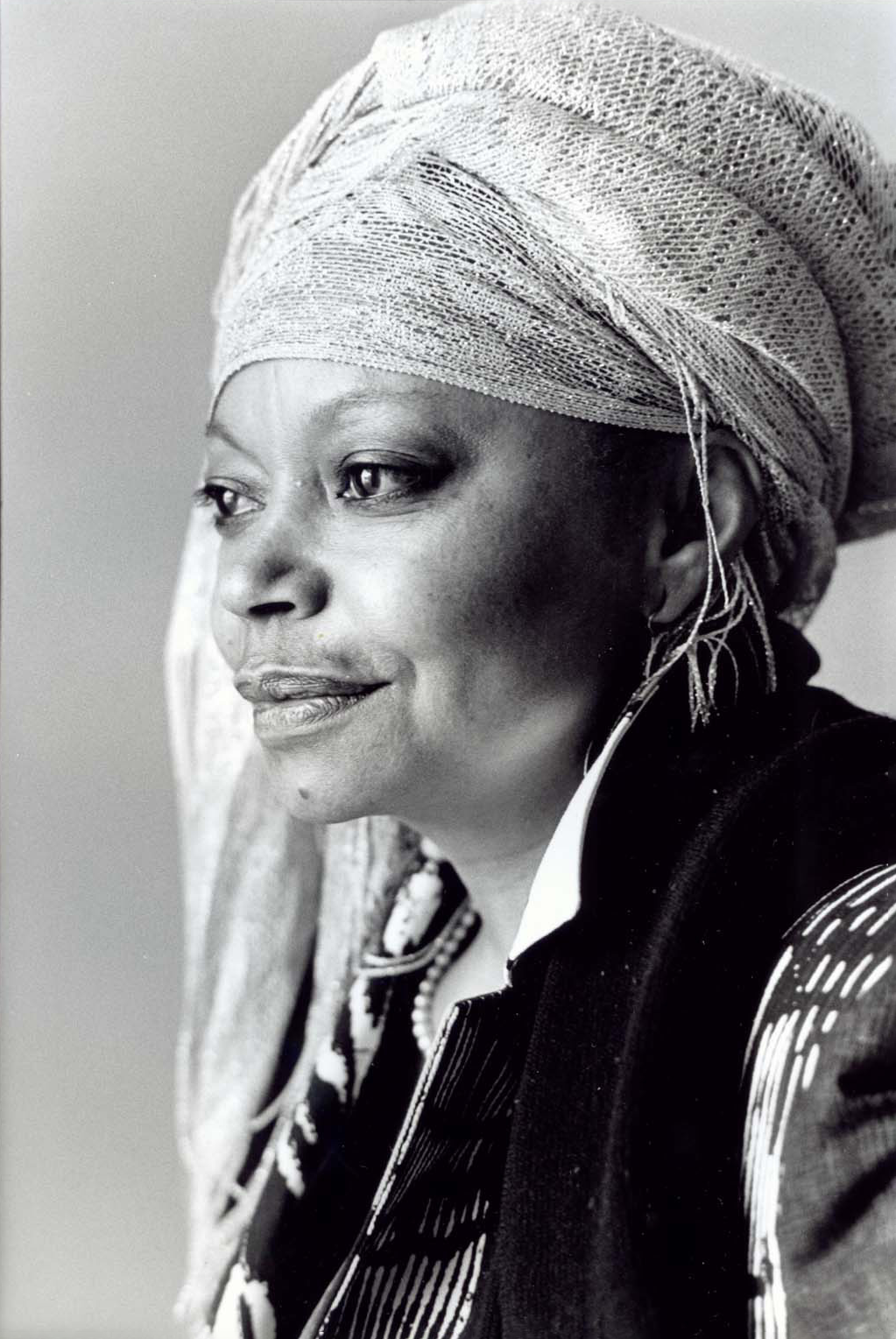
Miriam Goldschmidt as Winnie in Beckett's Happy Days, directed by Peter Brook at Kaserne Basel (2003)

Heidemarie Goldschmidt, known as Miriam (Frankfurt am Main, 8 July 1947 – Lörrach, 14 August 2017), was a German actor, theatre director and playwright who became internationally renowned thanks to her long association with director Peter Brook, whose International Centre for Theatre Research in Paris she was a member of for decades.

== Biography ==
Born in Frankfurt am Main in 1947, she ended up in an orphanage in Birstein after a few weeks of life, without ever knowing her biological parents. At the age of five, she was adopted by the Goldschmidts, a Jewish couple who had returned to Germany after forced exile. Her adoptive father, Leopold, was editor-in-chief of the Frankfurter Neue Presse and honorary president of the DKR, the German Council for Jewish-Christian Cooperation. In 1956, at the age of nine, Goldschmidt had her first acting experience in the children's television programme Der Peter, broadcast by Hessischer Rundfunk.

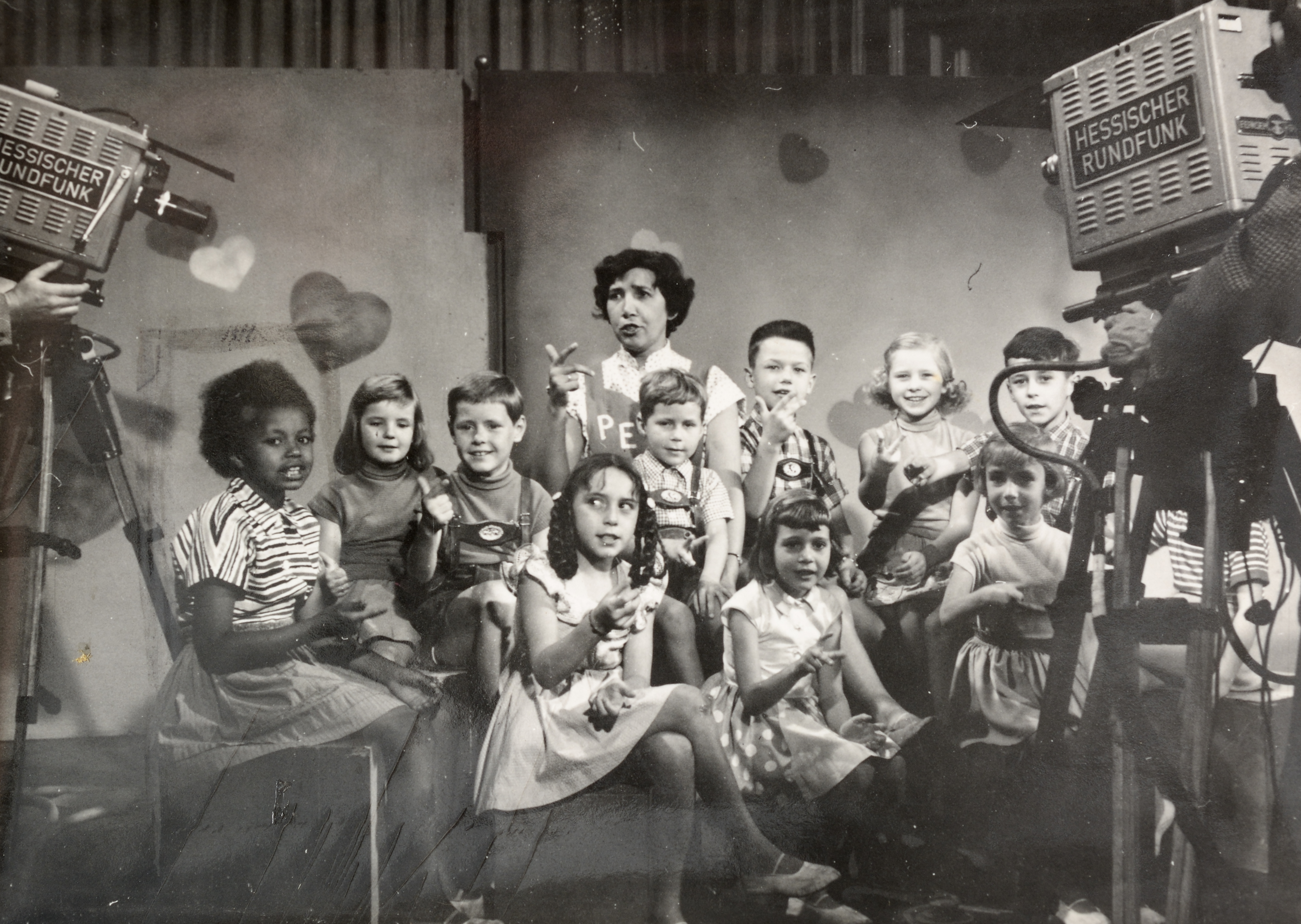
Goldschmidt in Der Peter (1956).

Shortly before graduating from the Odenwaldschule, Goldschmidt left school and moved to Paris to study acting with Jacques Lecoq and modern dance with Laura Sheleen. Her debut as an actress and director, Ophelia 69, described by Die Zeit as a 'mix of dance and pantomime, acting and free movement in space', dates from this period. During her career, she worked with leading post-war German directors, such as Harry Buckwitz in Darmstadt (HIM, 1968), Fritz Kortner and Peter Zadek in Munich, Hans Hollmann in Basel (playing Lavinia in Titus, Titus, 1969), Werner Düggelin, at the Schaubühne am Lehniner Platz in Berlin with Peter Stein (The Blacks, 1981) and Luc Bondy (Kalldewey, Farce by Botho Strauß, 1982, and A Burning Heart by Ostrovsky, 1986), in Bochum with George Tabori (Peep Show, 1983) and Matthias Langhoff (Titus Andronicus, 1983). For her role in Kalldewey, Farce directed by Bondy, Goldschmidt received the Kunstpreis from the Berlin Academy of Arts in 1983. During her years with the Schaubühne company, she staged Bruce Myers' adaptation for two actors of S. An-sky's The Dybbuk or Between Two Worlds in 1981. She performed this adaptation with her husband Urs Bihler on numerous stages for over thirty years, most recently at Theater Basel in 2011. She had two children with Bihler, Lou and Amba, who sometimes appeared with them on stage and in the film The Mahabharata. Her other productions include two adaptations, Da geht ein Mensch by Alexander Granach in 1991 and The Sacred Night by Tahar Ben Jelloun in 1993 at the Theater Neumarkt in Zurich, the Theater Tri-bühne in Stuttgart, the Pfalztheater in Kaiserslautern and the Stadttheater in Konstanz.

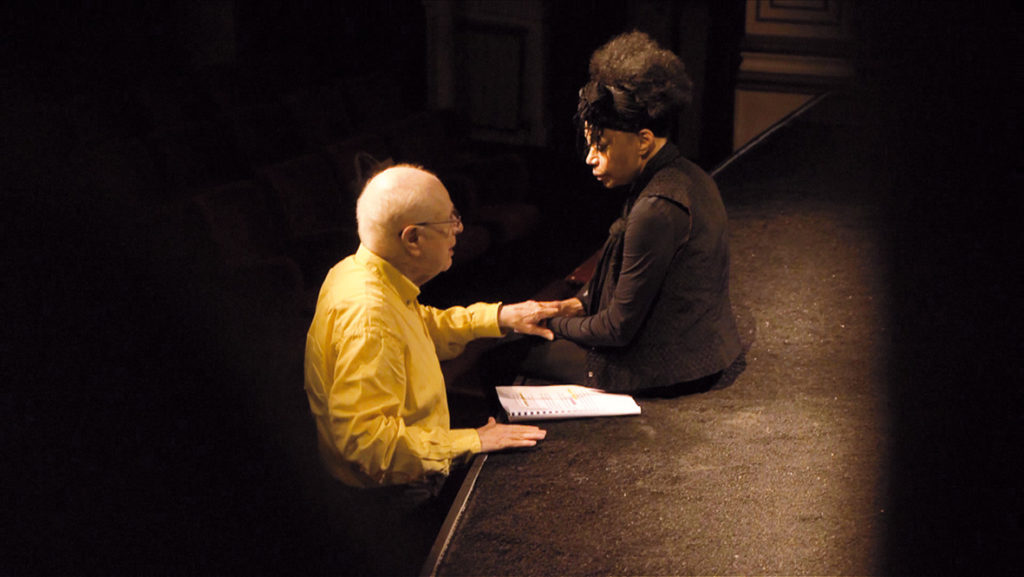
Brook and Goldschmidt during rehearsals for The Lost Ones at the Teatro Sannazaro in Naples, 2013.

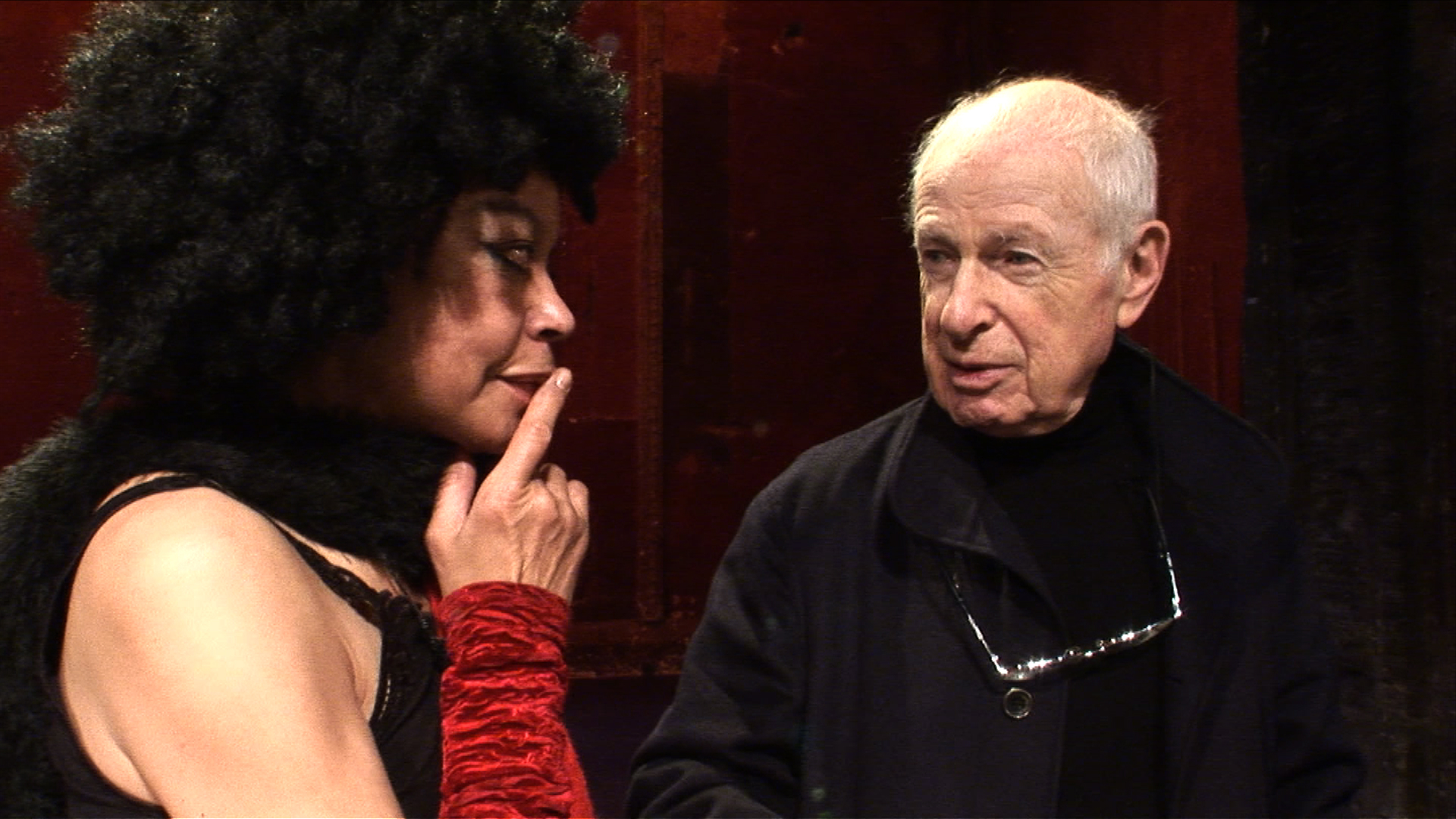
Brook and Goldschmidt during rehearsals for Warum, Warum at the Théâtre des Bouffes du Nord in Paris, 2011.

She found her true theatrical home when she joined Peter Brook in Paris at the International Centre for Theatre Research (CIRT) / Théâtre des Bouffes du Nord in 1971. During her ten-year collaboration with Brook, she performed in Shakespeare's Timon of Athens and Measure for Measure, Peter Handke's Kaspar, Colin Higgins and Denis Cannan's The Ik, Ubu, La Conférence des oiseaux and the Mahabharata, touring most of these around the world. Brook also directed her in Beckett's Happy Days and in his Warum, Warum and The Lost Ones, which was to be Goldschmidt's last play. She died of cancer in 2017 in Lörrach, at the age of 70.
