= Mohammad B. Ghaffari =

Iranian actor and theatre director (born 1944)

- محمد باقرغفاری
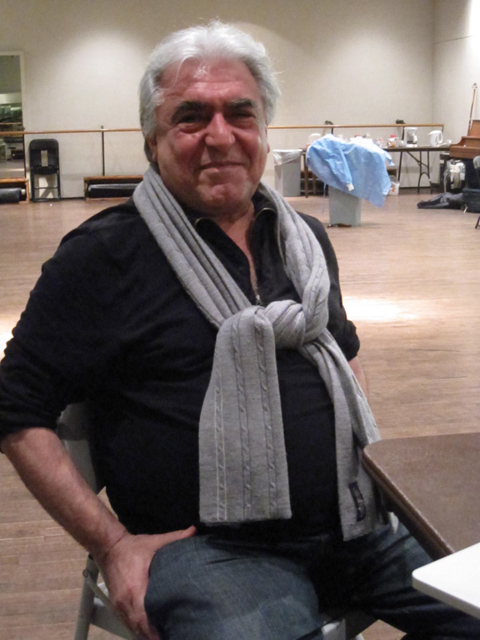
- Ghaffari in 2002
- Born: Mohammad Bagher Ghaffari; September 9, 1944 (age 82); Nishapur, Imperial State of Iran
- Other names: Mohammad Bagher Ghaffari, M.B. Ghaffari, Mohammad Ghaffari, Mohammed-Bagher Ghaffari
- Occupations: Actor, Director, author
- Years active: 1966–
- Known for: acting, directing, play and scriptwriting, production of traditional Iranian ta'ziyeh

Mohammad B. Ghaffari (born September 9, 1944) is an American actor, director and theater researcher. He received his theater training at the School for Dramatic Arts In Tehran, Iran, and was active as a professional actor on the Iranian National Stage. His work has been seen at international theater festivals throughout Europe, the Middle East, and North America, and he has appeared in numerous feature films. He is known as a premier expert on the Iranian theatre tradition, ta'ziyeh, which he has produced and directed numerous times in major international performance venues and festivals to great critical acclaim.

== Early career and Shiraz Arts Festival ==
Mohammad B. Ghaffari was engaged as an actor in Iran from his college days. In 1971 he joined internationally celebrated theater director Peter Brook and his International Centre for Theatre Research as an actor to perform as the Magician in Brook's historic production of Orghast in 1971, the first play produced by the Centre at the Iranian Shiraz Arts Festival. From 1974 to 1978 he became formally associated with the Festival of Arts in Shiraz at the request of Festival Director Farrokh Ghaffari, where he conducted research on, and produced for public performance, a wide range of traditional theater forms; these included the epic drama, ta'ziyeh and the improvisatory comic theater form ru-hozi (see Persian theatre). He also produced these traditional theater forms for the Festival of Popular Culture in Isfahan, Iran.

== United States career ==
Ghaffari moved to the United States to pursue graduate studies at Michigan State University in 1978. He later moved to New York City where he continued to work as a professional actor, most prominently at Ellen Stewart's La Mama Experimental Theatre Club. At La Mama he was a featured performer and director in numerous productions including: The Three Travels of Aladin with the Magic Lamp, Prometheus Bound, Uncle Vanya, Fragments of A Greek Trilogy, and A Chekov Trio (3 one-act plays for solo performer). He later became a United States citizen.

Ghaffari began his teaching career at Brown University where he was Guest Director and Lecturer from 1980 to 1982. In New York he was theatrical assistant to internationally renowned director Jerzy Grotowski at Columbia University from 1983 to 1984. This led to his subsequent appointment as assistant professor of Theater at Columbia where he taught acting from 1982 to 1992. In 1987-1988 he was also a faculty member at Trinity College in Hartford, Connecticut where he directed the first known modern production of the historical Ta'ziyeh drama Moses and the Wandering Darvish using traditional ta'ziyeh stage conventions. He was lecturer in Persian Literature in the Department of Near Eastern Studies, New York University.

Ghaffari directed the first international performance of traditional ta'ziyeh at the Festival d'Avignon in 1992 and later at the Festival d'Automne in Paris, and the Parma Theater Festival, both in 2000. He also both performed and directed performances at the Festival of Rouen, Belgrade Festival, Festival of Breslau, and the Festival of Nancy.

== Lincoln Center Festival ==
In 2002 Ghaffari directed three ta'ziyeh plays for the Lincoln Center Festival in New York City featuring performers from traditional ta'ziyeh troupes in Iran, to widespread critical praise.

== Film, television and directing career ==
As a performer, in addition to appearing frequently on the New York stage, Mr. Ghaffari also appeared in a number of Hollywood films, including Little Odessa, The Devil's Advocate (1997 film), Somewhere in the City and several television series, including The Americans. He appeared in collaborative productions with artist-director Shirin Neshat in a number of installations and films from 2000 to 2021, the latest being Land of Dreams (2021 film) directed by Ms. Neshat and Shoja Azari.

In 2007 he was guest artist at The Center for World Performance Studies at The University of Michigan where he worked with students on scenes from Shakespeare's Richard III in ta'ziyeh style. He repeated and extended this workshop at Brown University in 2009.

Ghaffari continues his research on traditional Iranian theater and is in wide demand as an expert on these traditional forms. He currently lives in New York City. He is an active member of the Screen Actors Guild.

== Publications ==
1988. The Director Speaks. In Milla Cozart Riggio, ed., Ta'ziyeh: Ritual and Popular Beliefs in Iran: Essays Prepared for a Drama Festival and Conference held at Trinity College and Hartford Seminary April 30-May 2, 1988. Harford: Trinity College

2005a. Acting Styles and Actor Training in Ta'ziyeh. (with William O. Beeman). TDR (The Drama Review) T188 (Winter 2005) Special Issue: From Karbala to New York: Ta'ziyeh on the Move. pp. 48–60.

2005b. Mohammad B. Ghaffari: Ta'ziyeh Director. An Interview by Peter J. Chelkowski. TDR (The Drama Review) T188 (Winter 2005) Special Issue: From Karbala to New York: Ta'ziyeh on the Move. pp. 113–123.

== Stage appearances (acting, directing) ==
- 1971 Orghast (Magician) Peter Brook, Director. Festival of Arts, Iran 1971
- 1982-3 An Evening with Chekhov Three One Act Plays (Director/Actor) La Mama, E.T.C., Harvard University, Newport Theatre Newport, RI
- 1983 The Three Travels of Aladin with the Magic Lamp.(Magician) Françoise Grund, Director. La Mama, E.T.C.; Theatre de la Ville, Paris; Rennes, France.
- 1984 Uncle Vanya (Illya Ilich Telegin) Andre Serban, Director. La Mama, E.T.C
- 1985 Prometheus Bound (Prometheus) Bill Reichblum, Director. La Mama, E.T.C. Columbia University
- 1987 Fragments of a Greek Trilogy—Electra, Medea, The Trojan Women (Jason), Andrei Serban, Director. La Mama, E.T.C., Festival dei Due Mondi, Spoleto, Italy & Italian Tour.
- 1988 Moses and the Wandering Dervish (A Ta'ziyeh Play in English) (Director) Trinity College, Hartford Connecticut
- 1989 Tales from 1001 Nights (Director/Actor) Trinity College 1989 Hartford Connecticut
- 1991 Three Ta'ziyeh plays (Director) Avignon Festival France 1991
- 1995 A Chekov Trio (Director/Actor) La Mama, E.T.C., Columbia University, Brown University
- 2000 Three Ta'ziyeh plays (Director) Festival d'Automne, Paris France; Parma Theater Festival, Parma, Italy.
- 2002 Introduction to Ta'ziyeh (Director) Guggenheim Museum, New York, NY.
- 2002 Three Ta'ziyeh Plays (Director) Lincoln Center Festival, New York, NY.
- 2007 Scenes from Richard III (Director) The University of Michigan In Ta'ziyeh style.
- 2011 Overruled (Lead Role) PERFORMA
- 2011-2012 Journey (Writer/Director) University of Minnesota, Minneapolis Art Institute.
- 2013 Passion of Layla. A New Opera. (Director/Creator) Chicago Art Institute.

== Film and television ==
- 1973 The Daughter- and the Mother-in-law (Agha)
- 1983 The Mission (His Eminence)
- 1985 The Equalizer TV Series (Mediterranean Man)
- 1990 The Days and Nights of Molly Dodd TV Series
- 1994 Little Odessa (Ahmad Pahlevi)
- 1997 The Devil's Advocate (Bashir Toabal)
- 1998 Somewhere in the City (Teddy)
- 2000 Agha joon (Agha)
- 2000 K (Father, Officer, Schmar)
- 2002 Fervor (as Mohammad Ghaffari)
- 2003 The Troupe Documentary (as Mohammad Ghaffari)
- 2003 The Last Word (Interrogator)
- 2014 The Americans TV Series (Salar)
- 2019 Land of Dreams (Dream Interpreter)
- 2021 Land of Dreams (Hirsute Man)
