= Gordon Parry (film director) =

British film director and producer (1908–1981)

- Born: 24 July 1908; Aintree, Liverpool, UK
- Died: 6 May 1981 (aged 72); Rambouillet, Île-de-France, France
- Occupations: Film director and producer
- Children: 2, including Natasha
- Relatives: Irina Brook (granddaughter); Simon Brook (grandson)

Gordon Parry (24 July 1908 – 6 May 1981) was a British film director and producer.

== Early life ==
He was born in Aintree, Liverpool, on 24 July 1908. Parry was half-Greek.

== Career ==
He worked on the crew of such films as Strictly Illegal (1935) and was a key member of the team at Two Cities Films.

He directed his first film Bond Street in 1948. He died on 6 May 1981.

== Personal life ==
He had 2 daughters, the actress Natasha Parry, who was married to the director Peter Brook, and Nina.

== Selected filmography ==
=== Non director ===
- Strictly Illegal (1935) - unit producer
- The Stoker (1937) - unit producer
- In Which We Serve (1942) - location manager
- The Demi-Paradise (1943) - assistant to producer
- The Way to the Stars (1945) - associate producer
- Night Was Our Friend (1951) - producer

=== As director ===
- Bond Street (1948)
- Third Time Lucky (1948)
- Now Barabbas (1949)
- Golden Arrow (1949)
- Midnight Episode (1950)
- Tom Brown's Schooldays (1951)
- Women of Twilight (1952)
- Innocents in Paris (1953)
- Front Page Story (1954)
- Fast and Loose (1954)
- A Yank in Ermine (1955)
- Sailor Beware! (1956)
- A Touch of the Sun (1956)
- The Surgeon's Knife (1957)
- Tread Softly Stranger (1958)
- Friends and Neighbours (1959)
- The Navy Lark (1959)
- The Adventures of Robin Hood (1960) (TV series)
