= Little Odessa =

Little Odessa may refer to:

- Brighton Beach in Brooklyn, New York City
- Little Odessa (film), a 1995 American crime drama film
