= In Good King Charles's Golden Days =

1939 play by George Bernard Shaw

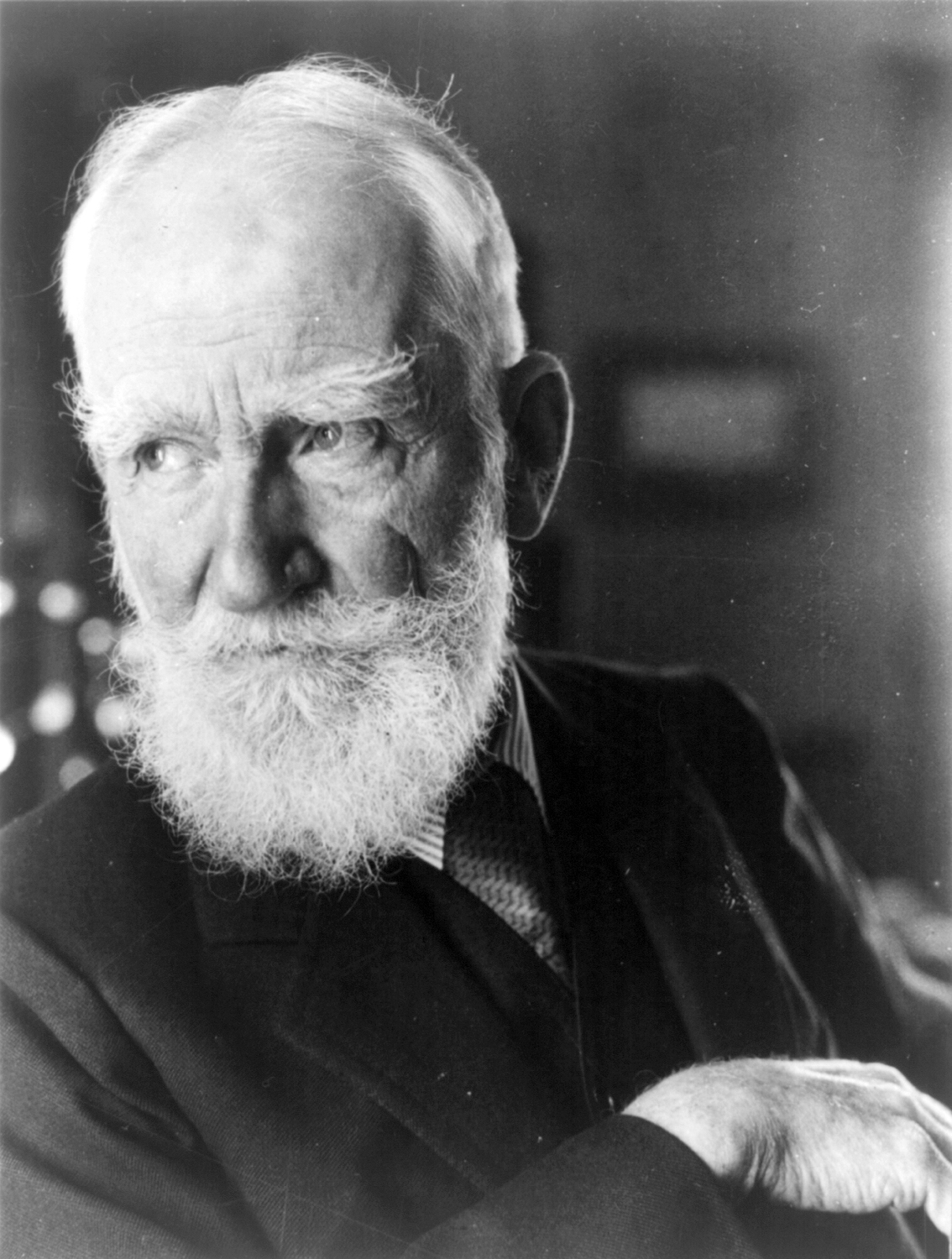
- Written by: George Bernard Shaw
- Characters: Barbara Villiers; Catherine of Braganza; Charles II; George Fox; Godfrey Kneller; Isaac Newton; Louise de Kérouaille; Nell Gwynn
- Original language: English

Premiere
- Date premiered: 12 August 1939
- Place premiered: Malvern Festival Theatre, Worcestershire, England

In Good King Charles's Golden Days is a play by George Bernard Shaw, subtitled A True History that Never Happened.

It was written in 1938-39 as an "educational history film" for film director Gabriel Pascal in the aftermath of Pygmalion's cinema triumph. The cast of the proposed film were to be sumptuously clothed in 17th century costumes, far beyond the resources of most theatre managements. However, by the time of its completion in May 1939, it had turned into a Shavian Restoration comedy.

The title of the play is taken from the first line of the traditional song "The Vicar of Bray".

== Plot ==
The setting is the English court during the reign of Charles II (r. 1660–1685). A discussion play, the issues of nature, science, power and leadership are debated between Charles ("Mr Rowley"), Isaac Newton, George Fox, and the artist Godfrey Kneller, with interventions by three of the king's mistresses (Barbara Villiers, Louise de Kérouaille, and Nell Gwynn). The short second act involves Charles in conversation with his queen, Catherine of Braganza.

== Original production ==
Billed as "A history lesson in three scenes by Bernard Shaw", the first production was at the Malvern Festival Theatre on 12 August 1939, directed by H. K. Ayliff and designed by Paul Shelving.

Cast:

- Mrs Basham: Isobel Thornton
- Sally: Betty Marsden
- Isaac Newton: Cecil Trouncer
- George Fox: Herbert Lomas
- Mr Rowley (Charles II): Ernest Thesiger
- Nell Gwynn: Eileen Beldon
- Barbara Villiers; Daphne Heard
- Louise de Kérouaille: Ina De La Haye
- James, Duke of York: William Hutchison
- Godfrey Kneller: Alec Clunes
- Catherine of Braganza: Irene Vanbrugh

Ayliff's production first transferred to the Streatham Hill Theatre on 15 April 1940, then to the New Theatre in London on 9 May 1940.

James Agate, writing for The Sunday Times, noted that the play was the best to have "come from the Shavian loom since Methuselah".

== Revivals ==
Ernest Thesiger, who again played "Mr Rowley", revived the play at the Malvern Festival on 11 August 1949. It was also revived at the Malvern Festival Theatre in 1983.

A radio production was broadcast on the BBC Third Programme on September 18, 1949, with Abraham Sofaer in the title role.

The first North American production was on 24 January 1957 at the Downtown Theater on New York's East 4th Street, where it ran for nearly two years, one of the longest runs of any Shaw play in the USA (as noted by Lawrence Langner).

A BBC production in the Play of the Month series, starring Sir John Gielgud as King Charles, was broadcast in February 1970.
