= The Mahabharata (play) =

French Play

- Original title: Le Mahabharata
- Original language: French
- Written by: Jean-Claude Carrière
- Based on: Mahābhārata

Premiere
- Date: July 7, 1985
- Place: Festival d'Avignon, Avignon
- Directed by: Peter Brook

The Mahabharata (French: Le Mahabharata) is a French play, based on the Sanskrit epic Mahābhārata, by Jean-Claude Carrière, which was first staged in a quarry just outside Avignon in a production by the English director Peter Brook. The play, which is nine hours long in performance (eleven with intervals), toured the world for four years. For two years the show was performed both in French and in English (it was translated into English by Brook in 1987). The play is divided into three parts: The Game of Dice, The Exile in the Forest and The War. In 1989, it was adapted for television as a six-hour mini series. Later, it was reduced to about three hours as a film for theatrical and DVD release. The screenplay was the result of eight years' work by Peter Brook, Jean-Claude Carrière, and Marie-Hélène Estienne.

== Stage history ==
The original stage play was performed at the 39th Festival d'Avignon, on July 7, 1985, at Carrière de Boulbon. There were 9 representations in a cycle of three plays : "La Partie de dés" (The Dice Game) on 7, 10, 16, 19, 25, 28 July; "L'Exil dans la forêt" (The Exile in the Forest) on 8, 11, 17, 20, 26, 29 July; "La Guerre" (The War) on 9, 12, 18, 21, 27, 30 July. And these were played together on Night of Mahabharata, on 13, 22, and 31 July.

The French stage version was produced by:Centre international de recherche théâtrales-Bouffes du Nord - C.I.R.T and the 39th Festival of Avignon (directed by A. Crombecque) and received the support of the French Culture Ministry and the City of Paris. The set design and costumes by Chloé Obolenski; stage management by Rémi Jullien; lights by Jean Kalman. The cast included twenty-one performers from sixteen Countries: Joséphine Derenne (Kunti), Maurice Bénichou (Ganesha, Krishna), Pascaline Pointillart (Amba, Subhadra, servante of Gandhari), Mireille Maalouf (Ganga, Gandhari, Gudeshna), Tam Sir Niane (Madri, Hidimbi), Mallika Sarabhai (Satyavati, Draupadi), Ryszard Cieslak (Dhritarashtra), Clovis Cornillac (Ekalavya, Uttara, Abhimanyu), Georges Corraface (Dushassana), Jean-Paul Denizon (Nakula, Aswhattaman), Mamadou Dioume (Bhima), Matthias Habich (Yudishthira), Andréas Katsulas (Jayadratha, Salva), Sotigui Kouyaté (Bhishma, Parashurama), Alain Maratrat (Vyasa), Clément Masdongar (Shishupala, Ghatotkatcha, eternal young man), Vittorio Mezzogiorno (Arjuna), Bruce Myers (Karna), Yoshi Oida (Drona, Kitchaka), Andrzej Seweryn (Duryodhana), Douta Seck (king of fishermen, Shakuni, Virata, Sandjaya), Tapa Sudana (Pandu, Shiva, Shalya), Ken Higelin (child), Lutfi Jakfar (child), Nicolas Sananikone (child), Samon Takahashi (child). The musicians included Djamchid Chemirani (percussions), Kudsi Erguner (ney), Kim Menzer (nagaswaram), Mahmoud Tabrizi-zadeh (kamantche), Toshi Tsuchitori (percussions).

The only staging of the play in Britain was at the Tramway, Pollokshields, in 1988, during Glasgow's year as European City of Culture.

== Critical reception ==
In a long article in 1985, The New York Times registered the "overwhelming critical acclaim" the production received and that the play "did nothing less than attempt to transform Hindu myth into universalized art, accessible to any culture". However, many postcololonial scholars have challenged the claim to universalism, accusing the play of orientalism. For instance, Gautam Dasgupta writes that "Brook's Mahabharata falls short of the essential Indianness of the epic by staging predominantly its major incidents and failing to adequately emphasize its coterminous philosophical precepts."

== See also ==
- Battlefield

== Sources ==
- Carrière, Jean-Claude. 1987. The Mahabharata. Trans. Peter Brook. Methuen Modern Plays ser. London: Methuen. ISBN 0-413-18730-6.
- Croyden, Margaret. 1985. "Peter Brook Transforms an Indian Epic for the Stage." The New York Times, August 25, 1985. Web. Accessed 2015-12-16.
- ---. 2009. Conversations with Peter Brook, 1970-2000. New York: Theatre Communications Group. ISBN 978-1559363501.
- Elsom, John. 1998. "Brook, Peter" In The Cambridge Guide to Theatre. Ed. Martin Banham. Cambridge: Cambridge University Press. ISBN 0-521-43437-8. 132-133.
