= King Lear (1953 film) =

1953 live television adaptation by Peter Brook

- Genre: Tragedy
- Based on: King Lear
- Written by: William Shakespeare (play); Peter Brook (adaptation)
- Directed by: Andrew McCullough
- Starring: Orson Welles
- Theme music composer: Virgil Thomson
- Country of origin: United States
- Original language: English

Production
- Running time: 73 minutes

Original release
- Network: CBS
- Release: 18 October 1953

King Lear is a 1953 live television adaptation of the Shakespeare play staged by Peter Brook and starring Orson Welles. Preserved on kinescope, it aired October 18, 1953, as part of the CBS television series Omnibus, hosted by Alistair Cooke. The cast includes Micheál Mac Liammóir and Alan Badel.

== Production ==
A heavily abridged version of the play, this production condensed the play by eliminating the characters of Edgar and Edmund. To compensate for their absence, the role of Oswald is expanded to take Edmund's part in the play's climax, and "Poor Tom" is included not as a disguised Edgar but as an actual madman.

Welles returned to America to star in this presentation. He was guarded by IRS agents, prohibited to leave his hotel room when not at the studio, prevented from making any purchases, and the entire sum (less expenses) he earned went to his tax bill. Welles returned to England after the broadcast.

== Cast ==
- Orson Welles as King Lear
- Natasha Parry as Cordelia
- Arnold Moss as Duke of Albany
- Bramwell Fletcher as Earl of Kent
- David J. Stewart as Oswald
- Margaret Phillips as Regan
- Beatrice Straight as Goneril
- Alan Badel as Fool
- Micheál Mac Liammóir as Poor Tom
- Frederick Worlock as Earl of Gloucester
- Scott Forbes as Duke of Cornwall
- Wesley Addy as King of France
- Fred Sadoff as Duke of Burgundy

== Home media ==
- 2010 E1 Entertainment, Region 1 DVD, February 9, 2010 ISBN 978-1-4172-3287-1

== Sources ==
- Ax, Sean (15 February 2010). "TV on DVD 2/16/10 – King Lear, Barnaby Jones and Lincoln Heights". seanax.com. Archived from the original on 7 January 2018.
- "King Lear (1953)". British Universities Film and Video Council. n.d.
- Crosby, John (22 October 1953). "Orson Welles as King Lear on TV is Impressive". New York Herald Tribune – via wellesnet.com.
- Howard, Tony (2005). "When Peter Met Orson: The 1953 CBS King Lear". In Boose, Lynda E.; Burt, Richard (eds.). Shakespeare, The Movie: Popularizing the Plays on Film, TV and Video. Routledge. pp. 124–137. ISBN 9781134707539.
- "King Lear Films". PBS, Great Performances. 19 March 2009.
- "ORSON WELLES is "enourmosly impressive" in the Peter Brook production of Shakespeare's KING LEAR now out on DVD". wellesnet.com. 11 February 2010.
