= Simon Brook (director) =

British film director

- Occupation: Film director
- Parent(s): Peter Brook; Natasha Parry
- Relatives: Gordon Parry (grandfather); Alexis Brook (uncle); Irina Brook (sister)

Simon Brook is a British film director, mostly of documentaries.

Simon Brook is the son of fellow director Peter Brook and the actress Natasha Parry. His sister is the actress and writer Irina Brook.

== Selected filmography (as director) ==
- The Unbearable Lightness Of Being (1988) - as assistant director
- Minus One (1991)
- Alice (short film starring Gabrielle Lazure, 1995)
- L'amazone (documentary, 1998)
- Karos d'Éthiopie, les amoureux du fleuve (television documentary, 2001)
- Brook by Brook (television documentary, 2002)
- Cleopatra's Lost City (television documentary, 2003)
- Jungle Magic (documentary, 2005)
- The True Legend of the Eiffel Tower (documentary fiction, 2005)
- Generation 68 (2008)
- Annie Nightingale: Bird on the Wireless (2011)
- Peter Brook: The Tightrope (2012)
- Indian Summer (2013)
- Hell Is Empty: All The Devils Are Here (2016)
- A Different American Dream (documentary, 2016)
