= Alexis Brook =

British psychiatrist and psychotherapist (1920–2007)

- Born: 24 January 1920; Chiswick, England
- Died: 7 August 2007 (aged 87)
- Occupations: Psychiatrist, psychotherapist
- Spouses: Maureen; Ruth
- Children: 2 (and 2 stepchildren)
- Relatives: Peter Brook (brother); Irina Brook (niece); Simon Brook (nephew)

Alexis Brook (24 January 1920 – 7 August 2007) was a British psychiatrist and psychotherapist.

== Early life ==
Alexis Brook was born in Chiswick. He was the eldest son of Simon Brook and his wife Ida (née Jansen), both Lithuanian Jewish immigrants from Latvia. The family home was at 27 Fairfax Road, Turnham Green. He was educated at St Paul's School, and then studied medicine at Cambridge University. His younger brother was theatre and film director Peter Brook.

== Career ==
He did clinical training at the Middlesex Hospital in London, and qualified as a medical doctor in 1943.

He served with the Royal Army Medical Corps from 1944 to 1947, in the later stages of Second World War and immediately afterwards, in the Far East: in India, Burma and Indochina (now Vietnam). His experiences in the war, of the effects of poor morale, led him to pursue a career in mental health.

After the war, he trained as a psychiatrist at the Maudsley Hospital in London and at Napsbury Hospital in Hertfordshire. He specialised in psychoanalytic psychotherapy at the Cassel Hospital in Richmond from 1956, and moved to the Tavistock Clinic in 1971. For a time, he was also a lecturer at St Bartholomew's Hospital. He retired from the NHS in 1985 but continued to practise as an honorary consultant psychotherapist at St Mark's Hospital in Harrow from 1986 to 1995.

He also wrote books and articles on research interests that included emotional problems in general practice, mental health and emotional environment as part of occupational health and health and safety at work, the impact of mental health on gut disorders, and psychosomatic ophthalmology.

== Personal life ==
He was survived by two children from his marriage to his first wife Maureen, and by his second wife Ruth and two stepdaughters.
