= Margaret Phillips (actress) =

Welsh-born actress (1923-1984)

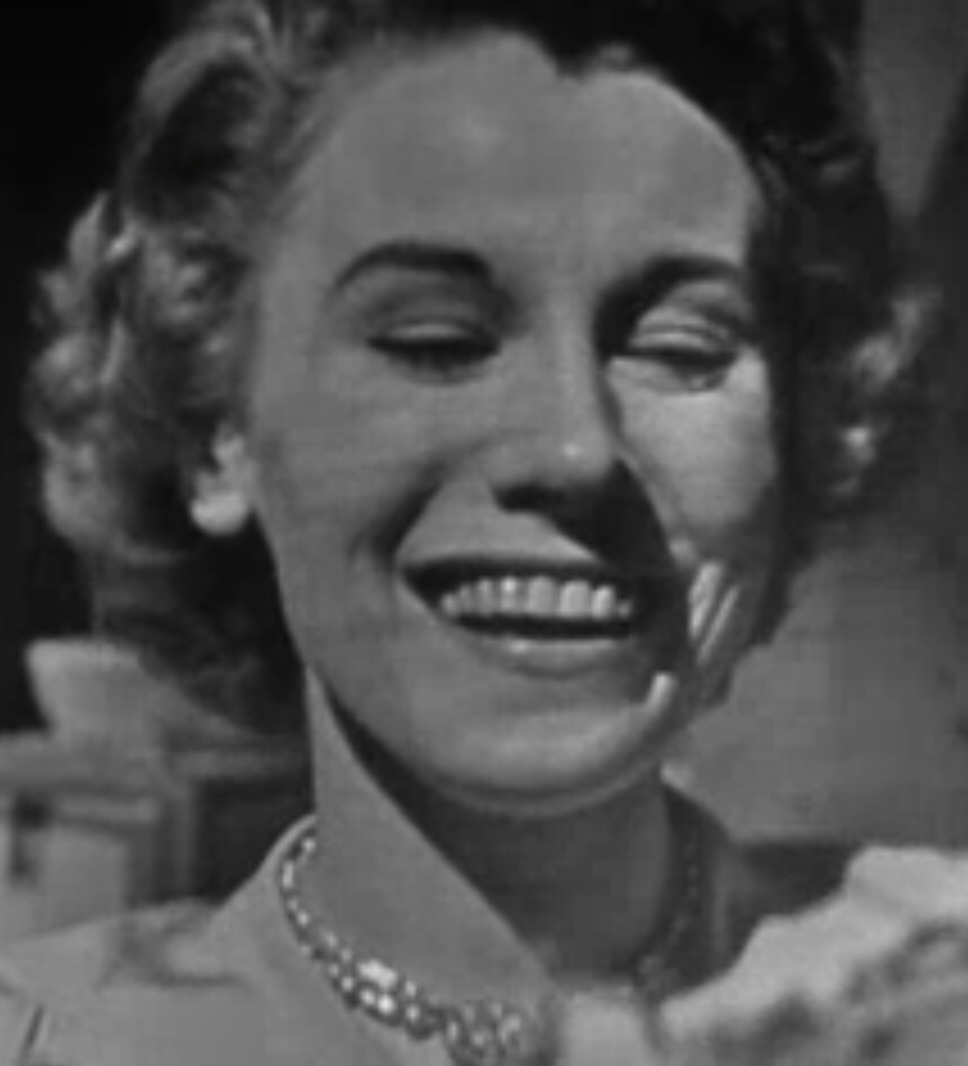
- Phillips in an episode of Tales of Tomorrow (1952)
- Born: 6 July 1923; Cwmgwrach, Wales
- Died: 9 September 1984 (aged 61); New York City, U.S.
- Occupation: Actress
- Years active: 1948–1986

Margaret Phillips (6 July 1923 – 9 September 1984) was a Welsh-born actress who was active on Broadway from the 1940s and in television in the 1950s and 1960s.

== Early life ==
Margaret Phillips was born at Cwmgwrach, South Wales. She moved to the United States with her parents at age 16 and attended Walton High School, a girls' school in the Bronx. She performed in summer theatre at Woodstock, New York and trained with actor Cecil Clovelly.

== Career ==
Margaret Phillips had a stage career lasting from the 1940s until her last appearance in 1982. In 1947, she won the Clarence Derwent Award for "most promising female performer" and the Donaldson Award for her supporting work in Another Part of the Forest. She played Alma Winemiller in Tennessee Williams's Summer and Smoke when it opened on Broadway in 1948. In 1950 she replaced Irene Worth in Cocktail Party by T. S. Eliot. She played Titania in A Midsummer Night's Dream in 1960.

On screen, Phillips appeared as Ray Milland's disabled wife in A Life of Her Own (1950, George Cukor, director), and in The Nun's Story (1959) with Audrey Hepburn, among other films. Phillips had a busy television career in the 1950s, with credits in NBC Matinee Theater and a 1950 production of Hedda Gabler for NBC. She played one of the King's daughters in a live 1953 television production of King Lear starring Orson Welles and staged by Peter Brook. In 1959, she starred in an episode of Rawhide titled "Incident of the Dust Flower." In 1960, she starred in an episode of Alcoa Presents: One Step Beyond titled "Call from Tomorrow."

Phillips was in the first membership class of the Actors Studio, along with Marlon Brando, Montgomery Clift, Maureen Stapleton, and many other notable actors.

== Personal life ==
She died from cancer in New York City, in 1984, age 61.

== Filmography ==
Year	Title	Role	Notes
1950	A Life of Her Own	Nora Harleigh	
1959	The Nun's Story	Sister Pauline (medical student)	
