= Orghast =

Orghast was an experimental play based on the myth of Prometheus, written by Peter Brook and Ted Hughes, and performed in 1971 at the Festival of Arts of Shiraz-Persepolis, which was held annually from 1967 to 1977. It was performed in two parts, with the first performed at Persepolis around dusk, and the second at the nearby site of Naqsh-e Rostam at dawn.

== The Play ==
Orghast was the International Centre for Theatre Research's first public performance at an international event. Peter Brook and Ted Hughes collaborated to create a comprehensive myth, weaving in and out of the Prometheus myth, to be performed at the Shiraz/Persepolis festival in Iran in 1971, which gave the group its first commission. It was written in part in an invented language that Hughes called Orghast, and this eventually also became the name of the piece. Classical Greek and Avesta were also used. (Avesta is a two-thousand-year-old ceremonial language, in which the letters of the words contain indications of how particular sounds are intended to be heard.) The piece was developed through improvisation with actors and experimentation, led by Brook and Hughes.

Brook's and Hughes' purpose in using these languages was to communicate with the audience in pure sound, in a mode in which meaning is conveyed in such a way that is intended to transcend rational discourse. According to his own descriptions, Brook's goals are related to those of sacred and ritual theater. Believing "the essence of theater to be magic," Orghast was supposed to bring the audience to alternate modes of consciousness, either "beyond themselves or below themselves."

- Directed by Peter Brook in collaboration with Arby Ovanesian (Iran), Geoffrey Reeves (England) and Andrei Șerban (Romania);
- Stage Set: Eugene Lee (US), Franne Lee (USA), and Jean Monod (Switzerland).

The story of this production is documented in a book by A. C. H. Smith and a chapter by Glenn Meredith.

== Actors ==
- Cameroon: Daniel Kamwa
- England : Robert Lloyd, Pauline Munro, Bruce Myers, Natasha Parry, Irene Worth
- France: Claude Confortès, Sylvain Corthay
- Iran: Fahimeh Rastkar, Nozar Azadi, Farkhundeh Baver, Dariush Farhang, Mohammad B. Ghaffari (as Mohamed-Bagher Ghaffari), Hushang Ghovanlou, Said Oveyesi, Parviz Poorhosseini, Syavash Tahmoures, Saddredin Zahed
- Japan: Katsuhiro Oida
- Mali: Malick Bagayogo
- Portugal: Joao Mota
- Spain: Paloma Matta
- USA: Michèle Collison, Andreas Katsulas, Lou Zeldis
