= Battlefield (play) =

Play

Battlefield is a play directed and written by Peter Brook and Marie-Hélène Estienne, based on Le Mahabharata by Brook, Estienne and Jean-Claude Carrière. It was made and premiered in 2015 at the Young Vic in London, and featured actors Carole Karemera, Jared McNeill, Ery Nzaramba and Sean O’Callaghan. The music was written and performed on stage by Le Mahabharata's musician Tsuchitori Toshiyuki.

== Reception ==
The play was described by Michael Billington in The Guardian as “a dazzling piece of theatre.”
