= Sally Jacobs =

British stage and costume designer (1932–2020)

- Born: Sally Rich; 5 November 1932; Whitechapel, London, England
- Died: 16 August 2020 (aged 87)
- Known for: Stage and costume design
- Spouse: Alexander Jacobs
- Children: 1

Sally Jacobs (née Rich, 5 November 1932 – 16 August 2020) was a British stage designer and director.

== Early life ==
Jacobs was born in Whitechapel, London on 5 November 1932. Her parents were Bernard and Esther Rich (née Bart), a furrier and milliner respectively. She studied at Dalston County secondary school in Hackney and then St Martin's School of Art, leaving school at 14. She worked initially as a secretary at a film company. However, experience of film continuity work, and particularly seeing theatre in the mid-1950s, made her return to study of stage design at the Central School of Art and Design in London.

== Career ==
Jacobs commenced her career as an assistant scene painter and then began designing. She began working at the Royal Shakespeare Company in 1962 and brought a very different appearance to many of their productions with her stage and costume designs. Between 1967 and 1982 she lived in the U.S. and continued to work as a designer and director for theatre and opera companies. In 1982 she returned to the UK.

During her career Jacobs has designed costumes and sets for a very wide range of theatre and opera productions. She has worked with organisations including the Royal Shakespeare Company, Royal Opera House, The English National Opera, The Royal Court Theatre, Paines Plough, The Mark Taper Forum in Los Angeles and Joseph Papp's Public Theatre in New York.

One of her best known set and costume designs was for the innovative production of A Midsummer Night's Dream by Peter Brook, in 1970. She was inspired by a production of the Beijing Opera to provide a blank white box as the stage and clothe the actors in brightly coloured costumes. This contributed to the lasting impact, and controversy, of this specific production.

In 1984 her design for Turandot at the Royal Opera House used mirror images and colour contrasts to suggest an audience all around the performers.

Jacob also taught stage design in the U.S. (including California Institute of the Arts, University of California Los Angeles, New York University, The Actors Studio and Rutgers University) and UK, including the Slade School of Fine Art. She was a senior lecturer in stage design at the Central School of Art and Design and was a Fellow at Goldsmiths University.

== Recognition and awards ==
In 1971 she was nominated for Best Scenic Design in the 25th Tony Awards and awarded the Drama Desk Award for Outstanding Set Design when the Brook A Midsummer Night's Dream was on tour in the USA.

Harvard University has added her archive to the Harvard Theatre Collection at the Houghton Library.

== Personal life ==
She married Alexander Jacobs (a screenwriter) in 1953. They had a son. They separated but did not divorce and he died in 1979. She was a very independent and adventurous person. She died 16 August 2020.
