= The Mahabharata (1989 film) =

- DVD cover
- Based on: The Mahabharata (1985 play) by Jean-Claude Carrière; Mahabharata by Vyasa
- Written by: Peter Brook; Jean-Claude Carrière; Marie-Hélène Estienne
- Directed by: Peter Brook
- Starring: See below
- Music by: Tsuchitori Toshiyuki; Rabindranath Tagore
- Country of origin: France; United Kingdom; United States
- Original language: English

Production
- Executive producer: Michael Birkett; Michael Kustow; Harvey Lichtenstein
- Producer: Michael Birkett; Karen Brooks Hopkins; Ronald E. Feiner; Abigail Franklin; Sara Geater; Michel Propper; Nina Steiner; William Wilkinson
- Production locations: Joinville Studios, Paris, France
- Cinematography: William Lubtchansky
- Editor: Nicolas Gaster; Michèle Hollander
- Running time: 330 minutes (TV cut); 171 minutes (theatrical cut)
- Production company: MP Productions; Film4; Brooklyn Academy of Music; Arte France
- Budget: US$5 million

Original release
- Network: Canal+
- Release: 24 January 1989
- Network: Channel 4
- Release: 9 December 1990

The Mahabharata is a 1989 television miniseries and film adaptation of the Hindu epic Mahabharata, directed by Peter Brook. It is based upon the French-language stage play based on the epic, written by Jean-Claude Carrière and directed by Brook in 1985. The film features a large ensemble cast, including Vittorio Mezzogiorno, Andrzej Seweryn, Georges Corraface, Mallika Sarabhai, Miriam Goldschmidt, Jeffrey Kissoon, Sotigui Kouyaté, Ciarán Hinds, and Erika Alexander. The musical score was composed by Toshiyuki Tsuchitori, drawing upon the work of Rabindranath Tagore.

Brook's original stage production was nine hours in length and toured worldwide for four years. In 1989, this abridged adaptation, just short of six hours, was made as a miniseries. This was in return edited into a nearly three-hour cut for theatrical release, which premiered at the 46th Venice International Film Festival.

== Synopsis ==
In general terms, the story involves epic incidents between two warring families, the Pandavas (representing good) and the Kauravas (representing evil). Each side, being the offspring of kings and gods, struggles for dominion. They have both been advised by the god Krishna to live in harmony and abstain from the bloody lust for power. Their fights come to threaten the very order of the Universe. The plot is framed by a dialogue between the Brahmin sage Vyasa and the Hindu deity Ganesha, and directed towards an unnamed Indian boy who comes to inquire as to the story of the human race.

== Cast ==
- Robert Langdon Lloyd as Vyasa
- Antonin Stahly-Vishwanadan as Boy
- Bruce Myers as Ganesha/Krishna
- Vittorio Mezzogiorno as Arjuna
- Andrzej Seweryn as Yudhishthira
- Mamadou Dioumé as Bhima
- Georges Corraface as Duryodhana
- Jean-Paul Denizon as Nakula
- Mahmoud Tabrizi-Zadeh as Sahadeva
- Mallika Sarabhai as Draupadi
- Miriam Goldschmidt as Kunti
- Ryszard Cieślak as Dhritarashtra
- Hélène Patarot as Gandhari
- Myriam Tadesse as Gandhari's servant
- Urs Bihler as Dushasana
- Jeffrey Kissoon as Karna
  - Lou Elias Bihler as Young Karna
- Maurice Bénichou as Kitchaka
- Yoshi Oida as Drona
- Sotigui Kouyaté as Parashurama / Bhishma
- Tuncel Kurtiz as Shakuni
- Ciarán Hinds as Ashwatthaman
- Erika Alexander as Madri / Hidimbi
- Bakary Sangaré as Kindama / The Sun / Rakshasa / Ghatotkacha
- Tapa Sudana as Pandu/Shiva/Salya
- Akram Khan as Ekalavya
- Nolan Hemmings as Abhimanyu
- Hapsari Hardjito as Utari
- Mas Soegeng as Virata
- Yumi Nara as Virata's wife
- Amba Bihler as Virata's daughter
- Tamsir Niane as Urvasi
- Lutfi Jakfar as Uttara
- Gisèle Hogard as 1st princess
- Julie Romanus as 2nd princess
- Abbi Patrix as Salvi
- Ken Higelin as Deathless boy
- Corinne Jaber as Amba / Sikhandin
- Joseph Kurian as Dhristadyumna
- Clément Masdongar as Gazelle
- Leela Mayor as Satyavati
- Velu Viswanathan as The hermit

== Production ==
The French and eventual English version of the Mahabharata took several years for Brook and Carrière to write and bring to the stage. Three years before the film version was made, Peter Brook staged their adaptation in French at a quarry in Avignon, France. This and the eventual filmed version were the first time that the entire (albeit abridged) story of the Mahabharata was brought to the stage and made into a feature film. In his book In Search of the Mahabharata: Notes of Travels in India with Peter Brook 1982-1985, Carrière speaks about the difficulty of adapting the Sanskrit into the European languages, particularly in regards to choosing the right words for certain terms. An example of this is atman, which is translated in the adaptation as depth of one's being. The screenplay

The series was produced by new French company Les Films du Troisième Etage as well as international co-producers from 18 different countries, including Britain's Channel 4 Films, France's La Sept, the Brooklyn Academy of Music and Mahabharata Limited, a company involving Brook.

It's quite impossible to 'forget' the Mahabharata. The poem says it itself: "Everything which is in the Mahabharata is elsewhere; which is not in the Mahabharata is nowhere."

— Jean-Claude Carrière, co-writer

Using an elaborate-yet-minimal set and multi-racial cast from 16 different countries for the film, Brook's Mahabharata stood in contrast with the "opulently religious melodrama" of the 94-episode BR Chopra version of the Mahabharata which aired a year before the Brook-Carrière adaptation appeared on TV. Along with one Indian actress, other actors of Caucasian, African, Asian ancestry filled the cast of Brook's version, including Vittorio Mezzogiorno as Arjuna, Sotigui Kouyaté as Bhishma, and Tapa Sudana as both Pandu and Lord Shiva. Most of the cast had appeared in the English-language version of the play.

The show was shot at the Joinville Studios near Paris. Chloé Obolensky adapted her original sets and costumes for the series.

The screenplay was the result of eight years' work by Brook, Carrière and Marie-Hélène Estienne. While working on the adaptation, Estienne travelled across Nepal and India, journeying from Manipur to Kanchipuram, in order to learn of the many different forms of the ancient epic from "Brahmins and writers and dancers and theatre people" across the subcontinent. Music composer Tsuchitori Toshiyuki remained in India for months on request from Brook to make sure the play would "not use the music which everybody knows". Musicians from Iran, Turkey, and Denmark joined the production in order to score musical elements discovered by Tsuchitori, who was particularly influenced by Rabindra Sangeet.

== Release ==
The original miniseries aired on Canal+ in France on 24 January 1989, and on Channel 4 in the UK on 9 December. The film version premiered at the 46th Venice International Film Festival, and screened later at the New York Film Festival. It was released to French theatres on 24 January 1990, and in the United States on 15 February.

=== Distributors ===
- Virgin Vision / R.M. Associates (UK)
- BAC Films (France)
- MK2 Productions (US)
- Festival Video (Australia)

== Reception ==
The film version of the Mahabharata received a 20-minute standing ovation at the 46th Venice International Film Festival and received an Emmy Award after the film was aired on TV.

The production's use of an international cast caused heated intercultural debate. On the topic of the multi-racial cast, Mumbai-based writer and critic Sanjukta Sharma writes: "The epic becomes intelligible and universal – and tells us why something as captivatingly human as the Mahabharata should not belong just to one nation or race."

=== Awards and nominations ===
In 1990, the film won the award for Performing Arts of the International Emmy Awards and the Audience Award for Best Feature at the São Paulo International Film Festival.

== Restoration ==
The film was restored in 8K resolution in 2024, which premiered at the 81st Venice International Film Festival in the "Classics" section. It later screened at the 2025 London Indian Film Festival.
