= Alexander Jacobs =

British screenwriter

Alexander Jacobs (1927 – 26 October 1979) was a screenwriter, best known for his work in the action field. His writing style for Point Blank was very influential on Walter Hill.

== Biography ==
Jacobs was born in London. He entered the British film industry in the 1940s, working in publicity and distribution. He wrote and directed for British TV and helped found the Free Cinema Group which was instrumental in the careers of filmmakers such as Tony Richardson, Lindsay Anderson and Karel Reisz.

In the 1960s, he was an assistant to producer David Deutsch on the film Catch Us If You Can (1965) directed by John Boorman and costume designed by Jacobs' wife, Sally. Boorman later wrote about Jacobs:

[He was] my real ally, the one whose opinion I came to depend on for making changes to the script... He looked not unlike Marty Feldman, the same square Jewish face. He had been a pro cyclist, competed in the Tour de France, and had smashed one side of his face in a bad fall. It had been rebuilt and a glass eye fitted, so that he had a similar disconcerting way of looking yet not looking at you, as Marty had. He was steeped in film and became my passionate advocate and counsellor.

Boorman says that one day Dave Clark, the star of the film, said "something insulting" to Sally ("he hated the clothes she made him wear") and Jacobs "flew into a rage. It was a terrifying sight. He frothed at the mouth. He smashed his fist into Dave's face." Dave Clark was unable to film for three days and Alex Jacobs was banished from the set.

When Boorman travelled to the US in November 1966 to make Point Blank he took Jacobs with him to write the script. "We had strong – that is to say, arrogant – views about films and film theory", said Boorman later. They wrote a draft in three weeks. According to one writer, Point Blank was "a major achievement, a reworking of a classic gangster text into an explosive reverie on American alienation and madness."

The movie was a success and Jacobs and Boorman later collaborated on Hell in the Pacific although the two fell out over the project and Jacobs quit. Jacobs stayed in Hollywood for the rest of his career. Boorman:

Alex found his spiritual home in Hollywood. He was a movie buff. He could pitch ideas. There was no one better at meetings. He was, as they say in Hollywood, 'great in a room'. He eventually became a rewrite man, a script doctor. When they had a project with intractable problems, they would send for Alex. He would demolish the script, reduce it to rubble, then when everyone was in despair, he would rebuild it into a potential masterpiece. I used to marvel at his profligacy. 'There's the germ of a great idea here,' he would say, slapping the script or twisting it in his hands, as though squeezing out that little pip of importance from the hundred or so pages of dross. Or, 'the audience is way ahead of you. The script is just the first third of the movie.' He bamboozled. He bludgeoned. He knew how to cut through to the quick, to what was essential, as he did on Point Blank. Sitting down and writing it, justifying what he had improvised at the meeting was another matter. He was at his best pacing a room. A typewriter did not inspire him. He had the temperament of a producer rather than a writer.

Jacobs' obituary described "a quintessential Alexander Jacobs image" from the film Sitting Target:

The first scene... takes us into a dank prison cell. We hear menacing grunts and stare in amazement at a grimacing, brutally determined convict "spread eagled across the ceiling like some huge dark spider" as he struggles through this bizarre isometric exercise. It's a spectacularly dynamic image that sums up the character and charges the movie with instant power.

Jacobs also worked as a script doctor. According to his obituary:

Too many were perfectly willing to let Alex serve merely as an adaptor, a rescuer of troubled projects, a brain to be picked. They knew how unerringly he could respond with a torrent of stimulating ideas. During meetings, even the stodgiest of executives would find themselves fascinated by his imagination and volatility. But Alex also scared them. He cared about his work with an intensity they considered uncool. He wasn't some unmanageable kid who would let himself be led by the nose in return for the chance to make a movie. He knew world cinema too well for that. Indeed, he was a constant magnet for people who, weary of the usual obsessive gossip about what's going through the roof and what's bombing this week, wanted good, lively talk about film itself. Alex was that rarity, an established screenwriter who constantly helped the unknown and the inexperienced.

Jacobs married Sally Rich (a stage and constume designer) in 1953. They had met in the early years of their respective careers when he was a writer and she a secretary at a film copyright agency in Soho, London. After their marriage, they had a son and the family moved to the USA as their careers developed. They separated but did not divorce.

Jacobs died at Cedars Sinai Medical Centre in 1979 aged 51.

== Select credits ==
- Every Day Except Christmas – production assistant
- Having a Wild Weekend (1965) – production assistant
- The Shuttered Room (1967) – also associate producer
- Point Blank (1967)
- Hell in the Pacific (1968)
- Sitting Target (1972)
- The Seven-Ups (1973)
- French Connection II (1975)
- An Enemy of the People (1978)
- World War III (1982) – uncredited – listed as original writer in 1979

According to some estimates, Jacobs also made "significant contributions" to ten other films without credit.

=== Unfilmed screenplays ===
- The Demolished Man from the novel by Alfred Bester set in the world where the ruling class possess telepathic powers – adapted by Jacobs in 1968, never made although Brian De Palma was going to direct it in 1977. "Everyone is afraid of movies with ideas", said Jacobs in 1979. "Beyond the special effects, this script is really about power, about the autocratic elite that ends up running government and big business."
- The Yellow Jersey – script about the Tour de France described by John Boorman as "very good"
- 1971 reported as working on an adaptation of a Dick Francis novel which he hoped to direct
- The Godfather III' (1977) – Jacobs was signed by Michael Eisner in October 1977 to write a sequel without the involvement of Francis Ford Coppola; the film was set in the present day, 25 years after the second movie, and focused on Tony Corleone, the son of Michael Corleone. He has a power struggle with his cousin Tomasso.

== Notes ==
- Boorman, John, Adventures of a Suburban Boy, Faber and Faber, 2003
