= Almost Peaceful =

2002 French film

- Directed by: Michel Deville
- Written by: Michel Deville; Rosalinde Deville
- Starring: Hala Zein
- Cinematography: André Diot
- Edited by: Judith Rivière Kawa; Andrea Sedlácková
- Release date: 2002
- Running time: 94 minute
- Country: France
- Language: French

Almost Peaceful (French: Un monde presque paisible) is a 2002 French comedy-drama film co-written and directed by Michel Deville.

The film entered the main competition at the 59th edition of the Venice Film Festival.

== Cast ==
- Simon Abkarian as Monsieur Albert
- Zabou Breitman as Léa
- Vincent Elbaz as Léon
- Lubna Azabal as Jacqueline
- Denis Podalydès as Charles
- Clotilde Courau as Simone
- Julie Gayet as Madame Andrée
- Stanislas Merhar as Maurice
- Malik Zidi as Joseph
- Sylvie Milhaud as Madame Sarah
- Éric Laugérias as Charles' Lawyer
- François Clavier as le Police Commissioner
- Bruce Myers as the King of the Forest

== Reception ==
On the review aggregator website Rotten Tomatoes, 73% of 30 critics' reviews are positive, with an average rating of 6.8/10.
