= Micheline Rozan =

French producer (1928–2018)

- Born: 11 September 1928
- Died: 7 September 2018 (aged 89)
- Occupation: Producer

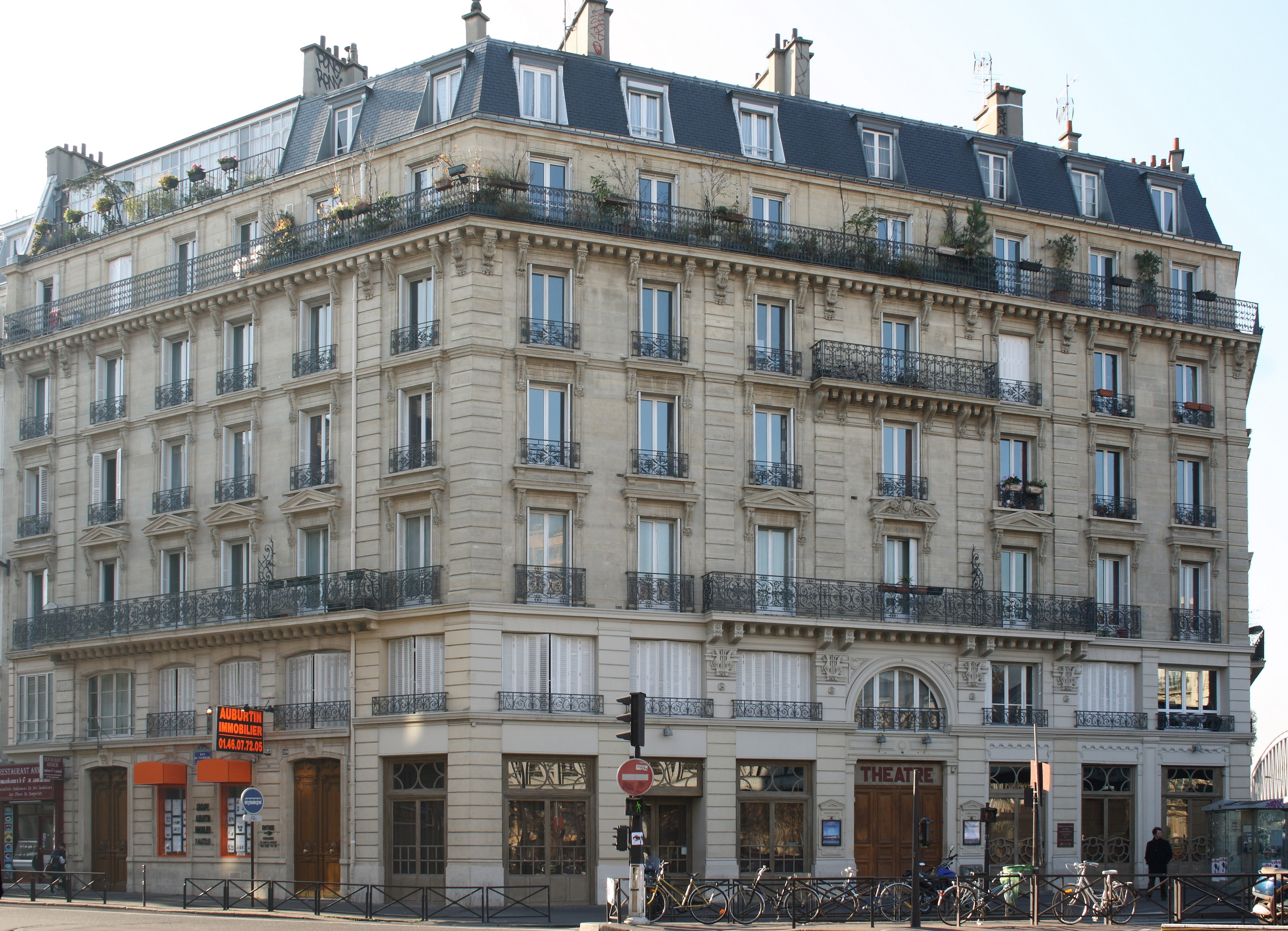
Théâtre des Bouffes du Nord

Micheline Rozan (11 September 1928 – 7 September 2018) was a French stage and film producer who co-founded the International Centre for Theatre Research with British director Peter Brook.

== Early life ==
Rozan was born into a Jewish family who had converted to Catholicism during World War I; however, her father was murdered in Auschwitz in 1943.

== Career ==
Rozan began her theatrical career as an agent, including for actors Annie Girardot and Jeanne Moreau. She first met Brook in the 1950s, and it was later, in the 1970s, that they worked together to transform the Théâtre des Bouffes du Nord in Paris into a major centre for innovative work. A significant part of Rozan's role at the theatre was to secure funding, which she achieved through approaches to the Ford Foundation, Gulbenkian Foundation and Anderson Foundation, UNESCO, the David Merrick Arts Foundation and the JDR III Foundation. As a result of these grants, the theatre was able to operate independently without obligation to commercial interests.

Rozan was also instrumental in providing Brook with introductions to key people in the Parisian theatre world; in 1960, she introduced Brook to Marguerite Duras. Brook and Duras adapted Duras' novel Moderato cantabile to a screenplay and Rozan produced the film with them.

Rozan retired from the theatre in the late 1990s. In 2006 she was appointed a Commander of the National Order of Merit.

=== Productions ===
- The Immortal Story (feature film, 1968, Criterion Collection)
- La tragédie de Carmen (feature film, 1983, National Video Corporation)
- The Mahabharata (stage play, 1987, Brooklyn Academy of Music)

== Later life ==
Rozan died on 10 September 2018, a day before her 90th birthday.
