= Sitting Target =

1972 British film by Douglas Hickox

- North American theatrical release poster
- Directed by: Douglas Hickox
- Screenplay by: Alexander Jacobs
- Based on: Sitting Target; 1970 novel by Laurence Henderson
- Produced by: Barry Kulick
- Starring: Oliver Reed; Jill St. John; Ian McShane; Edward Woodward; Freddie Jones; Frank Finlay
- Cinematography: Edward Scaife
- Edited by: John Glen
- Music by: Stanley Myers
- Distributed by: Metro-Goldwyn-Mayer (through MGM-EMI)
- Release dates: May 1972 (UK); 12 June 1972 (NYC)
- Running time: 93 minutes
- Country: United Kingdom
- Language: English

Sitting Target (also known as Screaming Target) is a 1972 British crime film directed by Douglas Hickox and starring Oliver Reed, Ian McShane and Jill St. John. It was based on the 1970 novel of the same name by Laurence Henderson.

== Plot ==
Harry Lomart, a convicted murderer, and Birdy Williams are convicts planning a breakout. Before the two men can abscond to another country, Lomart gets word that his wife Pat has been having an affair with another man and has become pregnant.

The two men had made plans to lie low after their escape from jail but Lomart decides to find and kill Pat and the man she has been seeing. Inspector Milton is assigned to apprehend the two escaped convicts.

== Cast ==
- Oliver Reed as Harry Lomart
- Jill St. John as Pat Lomart
- Ian McShane as Birdy Williams
- Edward Woodward as Inspector Milton
- Frank Finlay as Marty Gold
- Freddie Jones as MacNeil
- Jill Townsend as Maureen
- Robert Beatty as Gun Dealer
- Tony Beckley as Soapy Tucker
- Mike Pratt as Prison Warder's Accomplice
- Robert Russell as First Prison Warder
- Joe Cahill as Second Prison Warder
- Robert Ramsey as Gun Dealer's Bodyguard
- June Brown as Lomart's Neighbour

== Production ==
The film is based on a novel by Laurence Henderson that was published in 1970. The original novel focused on a duel between the escaped convict Harry Lomart and Sergeant Milton. The Evening Standard called it "a sleep banishing pursuit story."

The movie was made by MGM's British arm, under the auspices of Robert Littman. Douglas Hickox was signed to direct in July 1971. Filming started in September 1971. Due to restrictions about filming in British prisons, the prison sequences were filmed in Kilmainham Gaol, Dublin. The Winstanley and York Road Estates in Battersea feature prominently throughout the film as the setting for many of the action sequences of the main protagonist Lomart (Oliver Reed).

== Critical reception ==
The Monthly Film Bulletin wrote: "Another glib and glossy thriller along the lines of Get Carter [1971] and Villain [1971], considerably shallower and more stereotyped than either as it grinds nastily and rather artily (Douglas Hickox reveals a disconcerting passion for overhead shots) through a busy schedule of pain, mutilation and death. With its absurdly contrived plot and strictly one-dimensional characters (Oliver Reed doing his broody bit, Ian McShane doing his cheery bit, and no one else getting a look in), it has absolutely nothing to offer except its gleeful, plentiful and largely unmotivated violence."

Variety wrote: "The screenplay by Alexander Jacobs sometimes is difficult to follow, but Douglas Hickox's tense direction keeps movement at top speed. ... Reed's portrayal is topflight, Perhaps the more outstanding performance, however, is presented by Ian MacShane, as Reed's sidekick. ... Music by Stanley Myers captures the proper mood."

Sight and Sound called it a "sluggish, thuggish thriller, remarkable only for the number of violent deaths it manages to cram in, and the amount of footage it expends on Oliver Reed brooding explosively." The Radio Times Guide to Films gave the film 3/5 stars, writing: "A splendid supporting cast of TV familiars and peculiars make this a juicy and none too subtle excursion into the underworld." Leslie Halliwell said: "Rough, tough action thriller; passes the time for hardened addicts."

== Soundtrack ==
The soundtrack was composed by Stanley Myers. It was released by Finders Keepers Records (FKR004LP) in 2007.
