= Natasha Parry =

English actress (1930–2015)

- Born: Natalie Wills; 2 December 1930; London, England
- Died: 22 July 2015 (aged 84); Saint-Nazaire, France
- Resting place: Jouars-Pontchartrain Churchyard, Île-de-France
- Occupation: Actress
- Years active: 1949–2014
- Spouse: Peter Brook (m. 1951)
- Children: Irina Brook; Simon Brook
- Father: Gordon Parry (step-father)

Natasha Parry (born Natalie Wills; 2 December 1930 – 22 July 2015) was an English actress. Recognised for her work on stage and screen, she was best known for her collaborations with her husband, director Peter Brook. She was the mother of filmmakers Irina and Simon Brook.

== Early life ==
Parry was born Natalie Wills in London in 1930. Her mother was a White Russian émigré who, according to John Heilpern, was related to Alexander Pushkin. At some point, her mother remarried to film director Gordon Parry.

== Career ==
=== Stage ===
Parry made her stage debut at age 12 in The Wingless Victory. At 14, she was in A Midsummer Night's Dream, and later she played in Big Ben and Bless the Bride. On Broadway she appeared in The Fighting Cock (1959–1960). Toward the end of her career, she was in The Tragedy of Hamlet at the Young Vic in London.

=== Film ===
Parry made her screen debut in Dance Hall (1950). She appeared in many of her husband's productions including a live American television version of King Lear (1953) opposite Orson Welles, in Anouilh's The Fighting Cock with Rex Harrison, Meetings with Remarkable Men, The Cherry Orchard, and Happy Days.

== Personal life ==
In 1951, she married director Peter Brook at the Russian Orthodox Cathedral of the Dormition of the Mother of God and All Saints, Ennismore Gardens, Knightsbridge, London. The couple had two children, Irina and Simon.

Parry stopped performing for a year after contracting tuberculosis in 1952.

=== Death ===
Parry died on 22 July 2015 (Some sources say 23 July) while on holiday in La Baule, Brittany, France, at the age of 84 after a stroke.

== Acting credits ==
=== Film ===
| Year | Title | Role | Notes |
|---|---|---|---|
| 1949 | Golden Arrow | Betty Felton | |
| 1950 | Dance Hall | Eve | |
| 1950 | Midnight Episode | Jill Harris | |
| 1951 | The Dark Man | Molly Lester | |
| 1952 | Crow Hollow | Ann Amour | |
| 1953 | King Lear | Cordelia | |
| 1954 | Knave of Hearts | Patricia | |
| 1957 | Windom's Way | Anna Vidal | |
| 1959 | The Rough and the Smooth | Margaret Goreham | |
| 1960 | Midnight Lace | Peggy Thompson | |
| 1961 | The Fourth Square | Sandra Martin | |
| 1963 | Girl in the Headlines | Perlita Barker | |
| 1968 | Romeo and Juliet | Lady Capulet | |
| 1969 | Oh! What a Lovely War | Sir William Robertson's Lady | |
| 1979 | Meetings with Remarkable Men | Vitvitskaia | |
| 1981 | La fille prodigue | La mère | |
| 1982 | Le Lit | Eva | |
| 2014 | Le goût des myrtilles | Jeanne | |

=== Selected television ===
- Sir Francis Drake – The Prisoner (1961) as Countess Inez
- The Count of Monte Cristo (1964) as Mercédès

=== Selected theatre ===
- King Lear (1953)
- Tchin-Tchin (1984, Théâtre des Bouffes du Nord, Paris)

== See also ==
- List of British actors
- List of English actors
