= RSC production of A Midsummer Night's Dream (1970) =

Shakespeare play production

Poster for the production. It uses a modern graphical style, reflecting the production's break with the past.

The 1970 Royal Shakespeare Company (RSC) production of A Midsummer Night's Dream was directed by Peter Brook, and is often known simply as Peter Brook's Dream. It opened in the Royal Shakespeare Theatre at Stratford-upon-Avon and then moved to the Aldwych Theatre in London's West End in 1971. It was taken on a world tour in 1972–1973. Brook's production of A Midsummer Night's Dream for the RSC is often described as one of the 20th century's most influential productions of Shakespeare, as it rejected many traditional ideas about the staging of classic drama.

== Concept ==
Shakespeare's play is set in Athens and a fairy-inhabited forest nearby. Brook's aim was to reject the 19th-century traditions of realism and illusionism in the theatre, and focus instead on locating the play in "the heightened realm of metaphor". He also wanted to liberate the play from encrusted "bad tradition" so that the actors could feel that they were encountering the text for the first time.

As such, he avoided any realist scenery or props. Instead, the set, designed by Sally Jacobs, was a simple white box, with no ceiling and two doors. In Stratford, black drapes were hung above the box to hide the stage machinery; on tour, Brook decided to remove them, leaving stagehands and lighting technicians visible. The purpose of this was to return the stage to the simplicity of the Elizabethan theatre, in which there was little scenery and the sense of location was generated by the poet's words. However, this approach was blended with modern elements: the trees of the forest were represented by giant slinky toys, and Titania's bower was a huge red feather.

The fairy magic was represented by circus tricks. For example, the fairies entered on trapeze bars, and the love potion that Puck fetches was a spinning plate on a rod, which Puck handed to Theseus from a trapeze fifteen feet above the stage. When Bottom turned into an ass, he acquired not the traditional ass's head, but a clown's red nose.

The costumes were non-Athenian and non-English Renaissance. Instead, they were a colourful mixture of elements from different times and places. Oberon wore a purple satin gown. Puck wore a yellow jumpsuit from the Chinese circus. The mechanicals were dressed as 20th-century factory workers. The young lovers looked like 1960s "flower children" in tie-dye shirts and ankle-length dresses.

There were also unusual casting choices. It had been traditional for the fairies to be played by children or women, but Brook cast adult men instead, an effect described as "disconcertingly strange and threatening", and which made the forest a more frightening, adult place than in earlier productions. Brook also decided to double the roles of Theseus/Oberon, Hippolyta/Titania, Philostrate/Puck and Egeus/Quince. This was partly to create a smaller, more intimate company, but also to suggest that the fairies were not so much different characters, as different aspects of the human characters' personalities, an idea signified when Theseus and Hippolyta 'became' Oberon and Titania simply by putting on robes. Brook believed that Theseus and Hippolyta have failed to achieve "the true union as a couple" and work through their quarrels as Oberon and Titania.

Amid the blank white set, with its two doors, a red feather on a trapeze represents Titania's bower. Oberon (left) is anointing Titania's eyes with the love potion, while Puck looks on.

The production emphasized, to a level never before seen, the supposed sexual undercurrents of the story of Titania's infatuation with Bottom after he turns into an ass. Brook was influenced by Jan Kott's study of the play in Shakespeare Our Contemporary, in which Kott notes the phallic properties of the donkey, and argues that Oberon deliberately degrades Titania by exposing her to this monstrous sexuality. In Brook's staging, Bottom entered Titania's bower carried by the fairies, one of whom thrust his upraised arm between Bottom's legs to represent a phallus. In a jab at more traditional stagings, the sequence was accompanied by Mendelssohn's Wedding March, a piece of music originally written to be played as an intermezzo between Acts IV and V, but often used in more genteel productions for the final marriage scene of the play. Despite the disturbing undercurrents of this view of sexuality, many audience members found the play witty and affectionate in its treatment of sex, in tune with the spirit of 1960s permissiveness.

The end of the production stressed the idea of community between audience and actors. As Oberon spoke his final lines about sunrise, the house lights slowly rose, so that the audience was visible to each other while Puck spoke the play's closing speech. Upon the line "Give me your hands, if we be friends", the entire cast rushed into the auditorium to shake hands with the audience, turning the theatre into a "lovefest".

== Responses ==
The production was extremely popular, both in terms of box office and reviews. On the opening night, the audience gave a standing ovation at the interval. The majority of critics approved of the production. It was a box office success, and was quickly recognized as a theatrical landmark, and the product of a great artist: the Sunday Times reviewer called it "the sort of thing one only sees once in a lifetime, and then only from a man of genius".

There were naysayers, and the commonest criticism was that the production distracted the viewer from the play by prioritizing Brook's cleverness over Shakespeare's; one reviewer called it a "self-indulgent display of directorial gimmickry". Theatre historian John Russell Brown felt that the play was constrained by Brook's eccentric personal interpretations. However, even those critics who disliked the staging choices praised the verse-speaking for its clarity and freshness. One Shakespearean scholar supposedly watched it with his eyes shut, loving the acting, but hating the visuals.

Theatre historian Gary Jay Williams says the production was so influential that it became "the reference point for Shakespearean performance practice in general over the next decade". It encouraged the exploration of the play's darker, adult themes, which had been overshadowed by the tradition of treating it as a play for children. So innovative and distinctive was the production that it almost became a problem for directors, because "the burden of reinventing the play now fell on every director." However, it opened the door to much greater experimentation, so that "twenty-five years after Brook's staging, the diversity of approaches is staggering to review".

== Cast ==
The casting changed somewhat during the production's Stratford and London runs and its world tour.

The original 1970 Stratford cast was as follows:

- Alan Howard as Theseus/Oberon
- Sara Kestelman as Hippolyta/Titania
- John Kane as Philostrate/Puck
- Philip Locke as Egeus/Quince
- Christopher Gable as Lysander
- Ben Kingsley as Demetrius
- Mary Rutherford as Hermia
- Frances de la Tour as Helena
- David Waller as Nick Bottom
- Glynne Edwards as Francis Flute
- Norman Rodway as Snout the tinker
- Terrence Hardiman as Starveling the tailor
- Barry Stanton as Snug the joiner

The following changes were made for the 1971 London run.

- Terence Taplin as Lysander
- Patrick Stewart as Snout
- Philip Manikum as Starveling

The following changes were made for the 1973 tour:

- Gemma Jones as Hippolyta/Titania
- Robert Langdon Lloyd as Philostrate/Puck
- Denis Carey as Egeus/Quince
- Barry Stanton as Bottom
- George Sweeney as Flute
- Malcolm Rennie as Snout
- Hugh Keays-Byrne as Snug
- Zhivila Roche as Hermia
- Philip Sayer as Lysander
- Jennie Stoller as Helena
- David Meyer as Demetrius
- Richard Moore as Starveling
- Patricia Doyle as Fairy

Musicians 1970 Robin Weatherall, percussion Tony Mcvey, percussion Martin Best, Guitar

Musicians 1971 Robin Weatherall, percussion Tony Mcvey, percussion Edward Flower, guitar

Musicians 1973 Robin Weatherall, percussion and trumpet Tony Mcvey, percussion and trombone John Zaradin, guitar
