= Land of Dreams (2021 film) =

- Theatrical release poster
- Directed by: Shoja Azari; Shirin Neshat
- Written by: Jean-Claude Carrière; Shoja Azari
- Produced by: Amir Hamz; Sol Tryon; Christian Springer
- Starring: Sheila Vand; Matt Dillon; William Moseley; Isabella Rossellini; Christopher McDonald; Anna Gunn; Robin Bartlett; Gaius Charles; Nicole Ansari-Cox; Mohammad B. Ghaffari
- Cinematography: Ghasem Ebrahimian
- Edited by: Mike Selemon
- Music by: Michael Brook; Mina Ghoraishi; Siobhan Carmody
- Production companies: Bon Voyage Films; Land of Dreams; Palodeon Pictures
- Release date: September 2021 (Venice)
- Running time: 114 minutes
- Countries: United States; Germany; Qatar
- Languages: English; Persian

Land of Dreams is a 2021 American comedy film directed by Shoja Azari and Shirin Neshat and starring Sheila Vand, which premiered at the Orizzonti Extra programme of the 78th Venice Film Festival in 2021. It is shot from one of the last scripts written by French scriptwriter Jean-Claude Carrière.

== Cast ==
- Sheila Vand as Simin
- Matt Dillon as Alan
- William Moseley as Mark
- Isabella Rossellini as Jane
- Christopher McDonald as Blair
- Anna Gunn as Nancy
- Robin Bartlett as Jackie
- Gaius Charles as David
- Nicole Ansari-Cox as Simin's Mother
- Mohammad B. Ghaffari as Hirsute Man

== Reception ==
Lovia Gyarkye of The Hollywood Reporter gave the film a positive review and wrote, "It’s a witty and thrilling take on American culture that benefits from its creators’ immigrant experiences and inventive style."

Xan Brooks of The Guardian awarded the film two stars out of five and wrote, "...colourful, eccentric and flimsy, not quite fit for purpose; a film to weigh up for a moment and then set back on the stall."
