= Midnight Episode =

1950 film by Gordon Parry

- Theatrical release poster
- Directed by: Gordon Parry
- Written by: Rita Barisse
- Screenplay by: Paul Vincent Carroll; David Evans; William Templeton; Reeve Tyler; Rita Barisse
- Based on: Monsieur La Souris by Georges Simenon
- Produced by: Theo Lageard
- Starring: Stanley Holloway; Leslie Dwyer; Reginald Tate; Meredith Edwards; Wilfrid Hyde-White; Sebastian Cabot; Joy Shelton; Raymond Young; Leslie Perrins; Campbell Copelin; Natasha Parry
- Cinematography: Hone Glendinning
- Edited by: Charles Hasse
- Music by: Mischa Spoliansky
- Production company: Triangle Film Corporation
- Distributed by: Columbia Pictures (1951) UK; Fine Arts Films (1955) USA
- Release date: 31 December 1950 (United Kingdom)
- Running time: 78 minutes
- Country: Britain
- Language: English

Midnight Episode is a 1950 British thriller mystery film directed by Gordon Parry and starring Stanley Holloway, Leslie Dwyer, Reginald Tate and Meredith Edwards. The screenplay was by Paul Vincent Carroll, David Evans and William Templeton from an adaptation by Rita Barisse and Reeve Tyler of the 1938 novel Monsieur La Souris by Georges Simenon.

The film was released in United States on 19 May 1955.

== Plot ==
An indigent street performer of Shakesperian verse chances upon a wallet filled with money and private papers. For its loser's desperate acquaintances, the papers have more value than any finder could conceive. A value for them its retrieval makes imperative, and, for the seemingly- fortunate finder, its longed-for riches only involve him in their violent world, and in more trouble than he ever knew, as a poorer man.

== Cast ==
- Stanley Holloway as Professor Prince
- Leslie Dwyer as Albert
- Reginald Tate as Inspector Lucas
- Meredith Edwards as Detective Sergeant Taylor
- Wilfrid Hyde-White as Mr. Knight
- Joy Shelton as Mrs. Arnold
- Raymond Young as Miller
- Leslie Perrins as Charles Mason
- Sebastian Cabot as Benno
- Campbell Copelin as the General
- Natasha Parry as Jill Harris

== Reviews ==
The Monthly Film Bulletin wrote: "This is an English version of the French film, Monsieur la Souris, in which Raimu played the lead. As transferred to London, scene and atmosphere seem very artificial, and the story, poorly directed, is confused and not particularly exciting. Stanley Holloway, although occasionally achieving a comic moment, misses the character that Raimu found in the part; the rest of the cast is second-rate."

Kine Weekly wrote: "The film, adapted from the French, is admittedly off the beaten track, but it lacks tension and cohesion. After the first 20 minutes interest begins to wane, and not even the experienced and resourceful Stanley Holloway can restore it."
