= Marie-Hélène Estienne =

French playwright and screenwriter

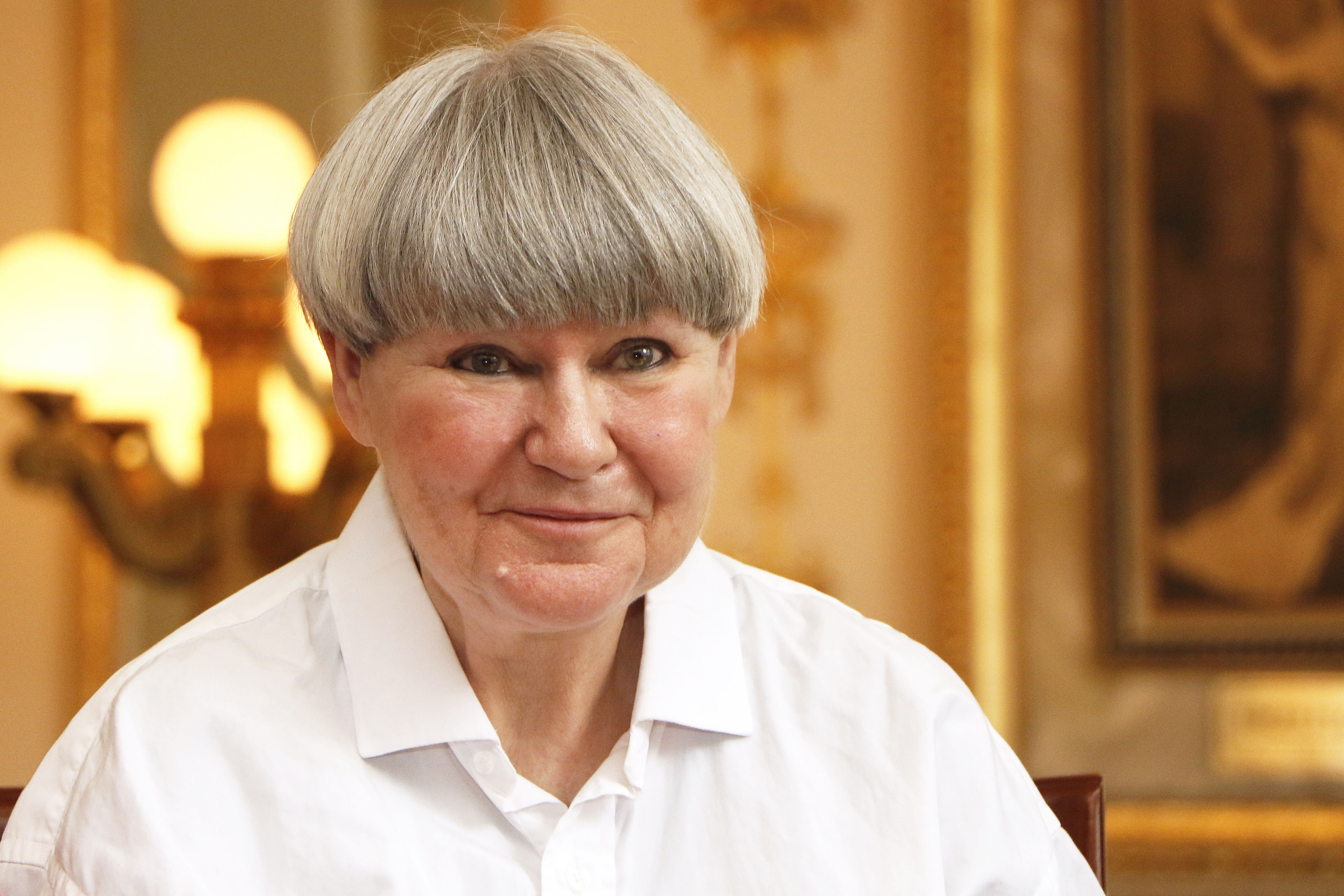
- Occupation: Producer

Marie-Hélène Estienne is a French playwright and screenwriter, probably best known for her collaborations with the British director Peter Brook and the International Centre for Theatre Research at the Théâtre des Bouffes du Nord in Paris.

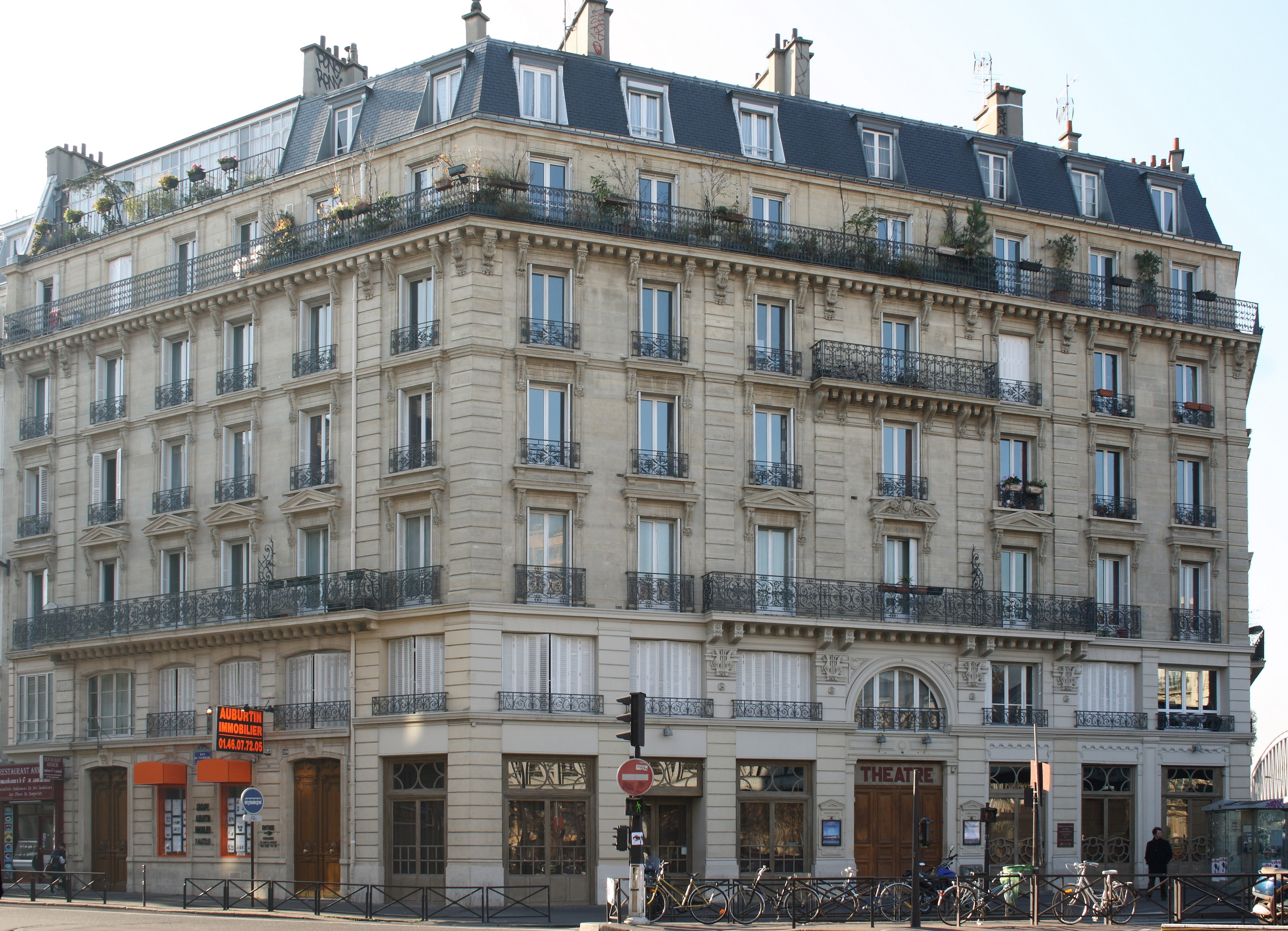
Théâtre des Bouffes du Nord

== Selected filmography (as writer) ==
- Faire la déménageuse (1972)
- Swann in Love (1984)
- The Mahabharata (1989)

== Selected television (as writer) ==
- The Tragedy of Hamlet (2002 TV movie)

== See also ==
- The Suit, a short story by Can Themba which Marie-Hélène Estienne co-adapted into a play with Peter Brook.
