= Little Odessa (film) =

- Theatrical release poster
- Directed by: James Gray
- Written by: James Gray
- Produced by: Paul Webster
- Starring: Tim Roth; Edward Furlong; Vanessa Redgrave; Maximilian Schell; Moira Kelly
- Cinematography: Tom Richmond
- Edited by: Dorian Harris
- Distributed by: Fine Line Features
- Release dates: September 1, 1994 (Venice Film Festival); May 19, 1995 (United States)
- Running time: 98 minutes
- Country: United States
- Languages: English; Russian
- Box office: $1 million (domestic)

Little Odessa is a 1994 American crime drama film directed and written by James Gray, in his directorial debut, and starring Tim Roth, Edward Furlong, Moira Kelly, Maximilian Schell, and Vanessa Redgrave. The film focuses on a hitman who reconnects with his estranged Soviet immigrant family in Brooklyn. The title is a reference to Brighton Beach, a Brooklyn community nicknamed "Little Odessa" due to its significant Soviet Russian and Ukrainian immigrant population.

== Plot ==
Joshua Shapira, a hitman for the Russian mafia in Brooklyn, is estranged from his Soviet Jewish immigrant family, specifically his father, Arkady, who disapproves of Joshua's criminal lifestyle. Joshua's mother, Irina—who is dying of cancer—and his teenage brother, Reuben, endure emotional and physical abuse from Arkady. After finishing a contract killing, Joshua is ordered to kill an Iranian jeweler in Brighton Beach, which he reluctantly accepts. Joshua stands outside his family's apartment, where he is spotted by one of his old friends Sasha, who tells Joshua's brother Reuben the next day. Reuben goes to the hotel where Joshua is staying to see him. Joshua asks Reuben how he knew he was in Brighton, and they plan to meet again the next day.

Joshua waits near the boardwalk where Sasha is and intimidates him to tell who else knows about Joshua being in Brighton. Sasha brings Joshua to the car repair stand where Viktor and Yuri are. Joshua says they will help him find the Iranian jeweler and when they refuse, Joshua threatens them.

When a man notices Joshua walking on the street, Joshua follows him to a phone booth and shoots him dead to avoid being exposed, angering neighborhood boss Boris Volkoff. Joshua starts dating his ex-girlfriend Alla Shustervich, who asks Reuben if he has seen Joshua anywhere, and the trio see a movie together. Eventually, Reuben takes Joshua home to see his parents again, but Arkady denounces him as a murderer and kicks him out.

Joshua uses information about his father's affair to see his dying mother, who, after reminiscing about the past, asks him to go to his grandmother's birthday party, which Joshua agrees to. On the day of the party, Joshua meets with his friends to kidnap the jeweler. They take him to the dump where Joshua kills the man, before burning the body in the furnace. They wipe the gun clean of prints and drop it near the furnace. Reuben witnesses the killing, and takes the gun from the murder scene. Arkady discovers that Reuben has been skipping school for two months and beats him. Upon seeing Reuben's bruised face, Joshua brings Arkady to a snowy field and prepares to kill him, but loses his nerve after Arkady tells him that there's nowhere left for him to go in Brighton Beach. Afterwards, Arkady relinquishes his son to Volkoff and Irina dies.

The next day when Reuben is riding his bike, two of Volkoff's men push him to the ground and tell him that Joshua is a dead man. With the mafia pursuing him, Joshua stays at Alla's.

Volkoff's men look for Joshua and search Alla's neighborhood. Reuben finds out from Sasha where Joshua is and rides there on his bike to warn his brother. One of Volkoff's men finds Alla outside hanging out laundry and shoots her before escaping. Reuben finds Alla's body and shoots the second would-be assassin. Sasha arrives on the spot and, seeing somebody behind the sheets that Alla had hung out to dry, immediately shoots the person through the sheet, believing it is one of the men looking for Joshua. When he looks behind the sheet, he realizes that he has killed Reuben; he runs off before Joshua can show up. Afterwards, Joshua finds Reuben and takes his body, wrapped in the sheet, to the furnace for cremation.

== Cast ==
- Tim Roth as Joshua Shapira
- Edward Furlong as Reuben Shapira
- Vanessa Redgrave as Irina Shapira
- Maximilian Schell as Arkady Shapira
- Mina Bern as Grandma Tsilya Shapira
- Moira Kelly as Alla Shustervich
- Paul Guilfoyle as Boris Volkoff
- Natalya Andrejchenko as Natasha
- David Vadim as Sasha
- Boris McGiver as Ivan
- Michael Khmurov as Yuri
- Dmitry Preyers as Victor
- David Ross as Anatoly
- Marianna Lead as Clara
- Mohammad B. Ghaffari (as Mohammed Ghaffari) as Pahlevi
- Tuesday Knight as Actress On TV (uncredited)

== Reception ==
=== Critical response ===
The film earned admiration from French New Wave filmmaker Claude Chabrol.

On review aggregator Rotten Tomatoes, the film holds a 57% "Rotten" score with an average rating of 5.4/10, based on 21 reviews. On Metacritic, the film holds a weighted average score of 64 out of 100 based on 18 critics, indicating "generally favorable" reviews.

=== Accolades ===
| Award/association | Year | Category | Recipient(s) | Result | Ref. |
|---|---|---|---|---|---|
| Belgian Film Critics Association | 1996 | Grand Prix | | Won | |
| Independent Spirit Awards | 1996 | Best Male Lead | Tim Roth | Nominated | |
| Independent Spirit Awards | 1996 | Best Supporting Female | Vanessa Redgrave | Nominated | |
| Independent Spirit Awards | 1996 | Best First Screenplay | James Gray | Nominated | |
| Independent Spirit Awards | 1996 | Best Cinematography | Tom Richmond | Nominated | |
| Independent Spirit Awards | 1996 | Best First Feature | | Nominated | |
| Venice Film Festival | 1994 | Silver Lion | James Gray | Won | |
| Venice Film Festival | 1994 | Golden Lion | James Gray | Nominated | |
| Venice Film Festival | 1994 | Best Supporting Actress | Vanessa Redgrave | Won | |
