= Bruce Myers (actor) =

British actor (1942–2020)

- Born: 12 April 1942; Radcliffe, Lancashire, England
- Died: 15 April 2020 (aged 78); Paris, France
- Occupations: Actor, director
- Years active: 1965–2011

Bruce Myers (12 April 1942 – 15 April 2020) was a British actor and director.

== Partial filmography ==
- No Blade of Grass (1970) – Bill Riggs
- Meetings with Remarkable Men (1979) – Yelov
- Measure for Measure (1979, TV movie) – Angelo
- The Awakening (1980) – Dr. Khalid
- Eaux profondes (1981) – Cameron
- Casting (1983, TV series)
- Dorothée, danseuse de corde (1983, TV movie) – Georges
- Prime Risk : adolescent dans le parking (1985)
- Le Génie du faux (1985, TV movie)
- The Unbearable Lightness of Being (1988) – Czech Editor
- La Révolution française (1989) – Couthon (segment "Années terribles, Les")
- The Mahabharata (1990, TV mini-series) – Ganesha / Krishna
- Présumé dangereux (1990) – Andreï Sletotchkine
- Henry & June (1990) – Jack
- Toutes peines confondues (1992) – Scandurat
- La joie de vivre (1993) – Karl
- Fausto (1993) – Roger
- Le Tailleur autrichien (1993, Short) – Franz Reichert
- The Browning Version (1994) – Dr. Rafferty
- Nostradamus (1994) – Professor
- B comme Bolo (1994, TV movie) – Lucien Salomé
- No Man's Land (1994, TV series) – Villard
- Associations de bienfaiteurs (1995, TV mini-series) – Georges
- Quai n°1 (1997, TV series) – Villard
- La Mondaine (1997, TV series) – Allen
- Disparus (1998) – Man Ray
- The Governess (1998) – Rosina's Father
- Let There Be Light (1998) – Le Rabbin
- Louise (Take 2) (1998) – The Hobo
- Almost Peaceful (2002) – Forest King / Old Tailor
- The Tragedy of Hamlet (2002, TV movie) – Polonius / Gravedigger
- Frères (2004) – François, le père
- The Young Lieutenant (2005) – L'Anglais
- Nuage (2007) – Franz
- Page Eight (2011, TV movie) – Joseph Pierpan (final film role)

== See also ==
- List of British actors
