= Paul Shelving =

British theatre designer

Paul Shelving (1888–1968) was a British theatre designer. He worked at the Birmingham Repertory Theatre and for the Malvern Festival and at the Shakespeare Theatre in Stratford-upon-Avon. He joined the Birmingham Repertory Theatre soon after First World War. He designed productions for over forty years.

His designs covered many styles. In The Immortal Hour he produced a mysterious forest in the symbolist style, with patterned tree trunks and a misty atmosphere.

For the 1923 production of Cymbeline, Shelving's modern setting and dress was one of the first of its kind.

His designs for The Tempest at Stratford in 1946 was "magical and fantastic with ranges of coloured crags. Shelving was a fine colourist who enjoyed blocking out broad masses in patterns."
