= Théâtre des Bouffes du Nord =

Theatre in Paris, France

- Théâtre Molière (1904-1914); Théâtre des Carrefours (1945-1952)
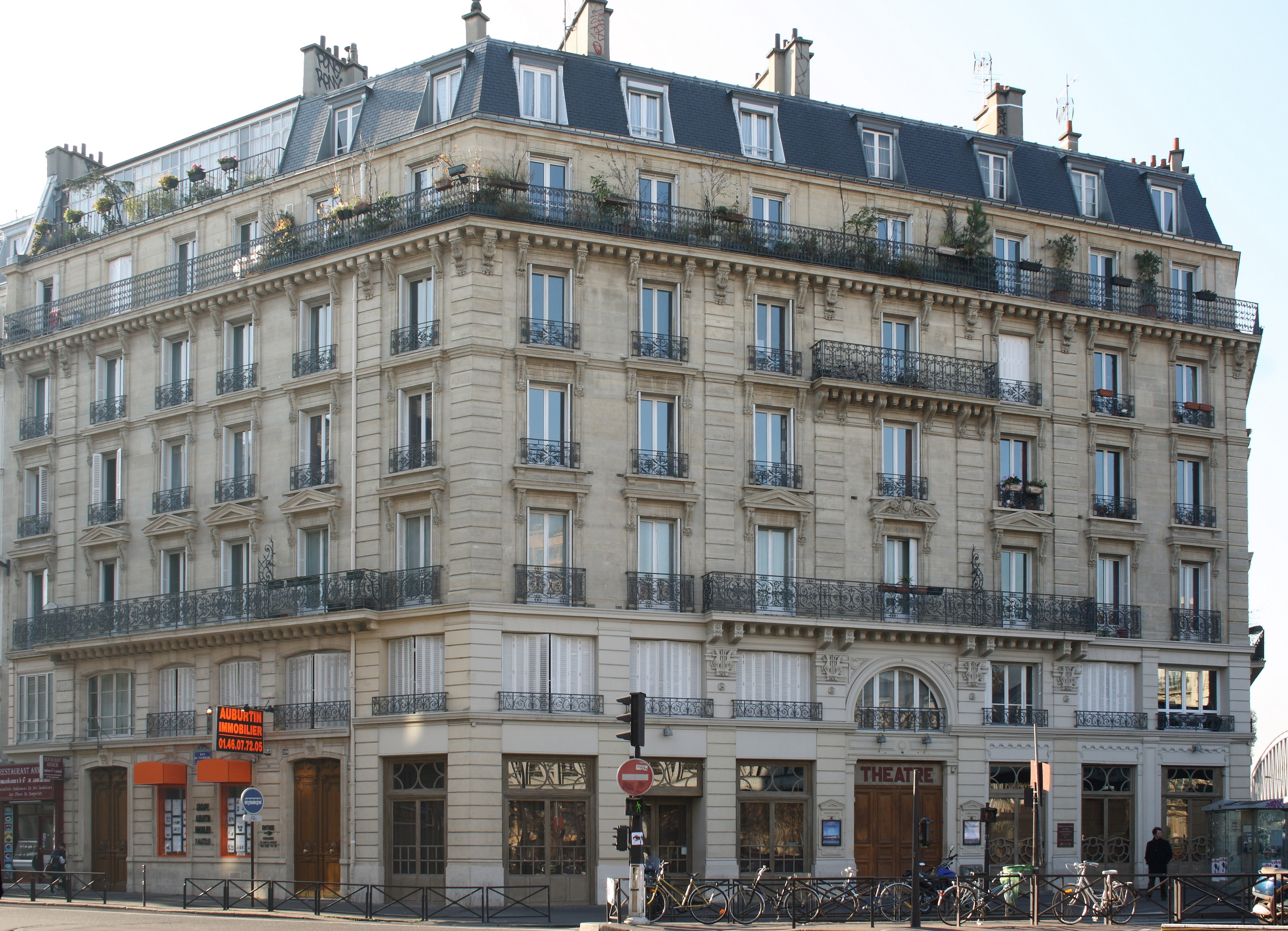
- Interactive map of Théâtre des Bouffes du Nord
- Address: 37 bis, boulevard de la Chapelle; Paris; France
- Coordinates: 48.8840°N 2.3588°E
- Capacity: 503

Construction
- Opened: 1876

Website
- www.bouffesdunord.com

The Bouffes du Nord is a theatre at 37 bis, boulevard de la Chapelle, in the 10th arrondissement of Paris located near the Gare du Nord. It has been listed since 1993 as a monument historique by the French Ministry of Culture.

== History ==
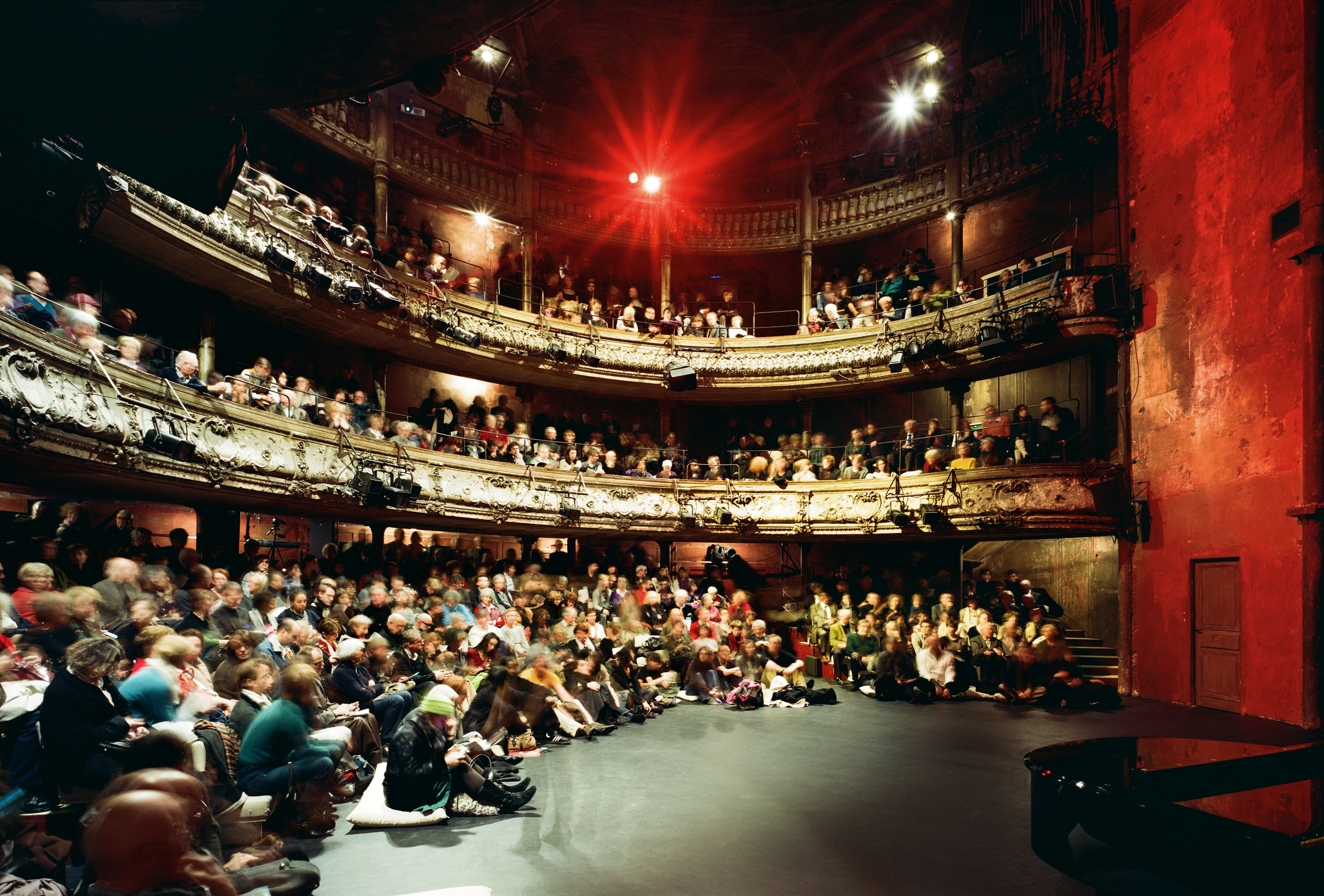
The auditorium of the theatre before the start of a performance, 2010

Founded in 1876, it had an erratic existence and seemed that it would never get off the ground. In its first decade it had fifteen different artistic directors, the most notorious being Olga Léaud who fled the theatre after her production had failed, taking the contents of the theatre safe with her.

The theatre's fortunes were revived briefly in 1885 by the arrival of Abel Ballet as the director. In 1896, Abel Ballet left the direction of Bouffes North. The two actors Emmanuel Clot and G. Dublay succeeded him. In 1904, the theatre, under the direction of its directors, was entirely restored, repainted, and equipped with electricity. The theatre was renamed the Théâtre Molière and authors such as Arthur Bernède and Gaston Leroux were assembled to write plays for the newly named theatre. In August 1914 the Théâtre Molière, like other theatres, closed its doors. Until 1974, the theatre was inhabited by a number of theatre companies, none of which were able to afford the repairs and maintenance needed for it to conform with safety regulations.

British director Peter Brook and French producer Micheline Rozan took over the theatre in 1974 as the home for their theatre company, the International Centre for Theatre Research. A renovation followed.

In 2008, Brook announced that he would slowly hand the reins over to Olivier Mantei, the deputy head of the Paris opera company Opéra-Comique and head of the musical programming at the Bouffes du Nord, and Olivier Poubelle, a theatre entrepreneur specialising in modern music. His farewell production was A Magic Flute.

== See also ==
- The Suit, a short story by Can Themba which was co-adapted into a play in French and English (as "Le costume" in 1999 and "The Suit" from 2012-2014) by Peter Brook and Marie-Hélène Estienne and performed at Bouffes du Nord
