= Irina Brook =

British-French stage director and producer

Irina Brook is an British-French theatre and opera director known for her work in both classical and contemporary productions, and a former actress.

== Personal life ==
Born in Paris to director Peter Brook and actress Natasha Parry, she was educated between England and France before moving to New York to study acting with Stella Adler, making her stage debut in Off-Broadway productions.

== Acting ==
Brook worked for several years as an actor appearing in films such as Captive (1986).

== Directing career ==
Brook’s recognition as a theatre director came in London in 1996 with ‘Beast on the Moon’ at the Battersea Arts Centre. She directed productions of ‘Mrs Klein’ at the Palace Theatre and ‘All’s Well that Ends Well’ at the Oxford Playhouse before establishing herself in Paris with her French adaptation of ‘Beast on the Moon’, which won five Molière Awards, including Best Director and Best Play.

Her opera career began directing Mozart’s ‘Die Zauberflöte’ for the Nederlandse Reisopera. She has since directed a range of operatic works at major opera houses around the world, including Tchaikovsky’s ‘Yevgeny Onegin’, Rossini’s ‘La Cenerentola’ and Verdi’s ‘La Traviata’. Her work at Teatro La Scala in Milan includes ‘Die Sieben Todsünden’, ‘La Rodine’ and ‘Il Matrimonio Segreto’.

In 2003 she formed Irina’s Dream Theatre Company, through which she toured globally with productions of Brecht’s ‘Der Gute Mensch von Sezuan’, Marivaux’s ‘L’Île des Esclaves’ and ‘A Midsummer Night’s Dream’ internationally. Her work at major festivals includes the Salzburg Festival, Barbican Centre, Spoleto Festival, and her production The Island Trilogy, which toured internationally.

From 2014-2021, she was the first female Director of the Théâtre National de Nice, where she produced, curated and directed the theatre’s programme.

Her work in theatre and opera has been recognised with several awards, including the ‘Chevalier and Officier of the Ordre des Arts et des Lettres’, the ‘Molière Award’ for Best Director & Best Play and in 2023 the ‘Commandeur de l’Ordre des Arts et des Lettres’.

== Theatre ==
Beast on the Moon	1996	BAC, London
Mrs Klein	1997	The Palace, Watford
All’s Well that Ends Well	1997	Playhouse, Oxford
Une Bête sur la Lune (Beast on the Moon)	1998	Théâtre de l'Oeuvre, Paris
Resonance	2000	Theâtre de l'Atelier, Paris
Der Gute Mensch von Sezuan	2004	Theatre National de Challiot, Paris
Der Gute Mensch von Sezuan	2005	International Tour
The Canterville Ghosts	2008	Shakespeare & Company, Masscheutas
A Midsummer Night’s Dream	2008	Dedans-Dehors, Brittany & International Tour
Somewhere...la Mancha	2008	Villeneuve-lès-Avignon Festival & International Tour
The Tempest	2012	Salzberg Festival
Peer Gynt	2012	Salzberg Festival
The Island Trilogy (La Trilogie des Îles)	2013	Spoleto Festival
The Island Trilogy (La Trilogie des Îles)	2013	International Tour
The Odyssey	2014	Theatre National, Nice
Peer Gynt	2014	Barbican Theatre, London
Artistic Director	2014 - 2021	Theatre National, Nice
Artist-in-Residence	2021	Teatro Stabile del Veneto, Venice
Artist-in-Residence	2023	Château d’Hardelot’s Elizabethan Globe Theatre

== Opera ==
Die Zauberflöte (The Magic Flute)	1999 & 2001	Nederlandse Reisopera
Yevgeny Onegin	2002	Festival d’Aix-en-Provence
La Cenerentola	2003	Théâtre des Champs-Elysées, Paris
Yevgeny Onegin	2004	International Tour
La Traviata	2004	Opéra de Lille
La Cenerentola	2004	Teatro Comunale di Bologna
Giulio Cesare	2006	Théâtre des Champs-Elysées, Paris
La Traviata	2007	Teatro Comunale di Bologna
Don Pasquale	2017	Vienna State Opera
L’elisir d’amore	2017	Deutsche Opera, Berlin
A Midsummer Night’s Dream	2019	Vienna State Opera
Mahagonny-Songspiel	2021	La Scala, Milan
Die Sieben Todsünden	2021	La Scala, Milan
Il Matrimonio Segreto	2022	La Scala, Milan
La Rondine	2024	La Scala, Milan
Carmen	2025	Nikikai Opera, Tokyo
Brecht/Weill Triple Bill	2025	La Scala, Milan

== Awards ==
Best Director	1998	Molière Award
Best Play	1998	Molière Award
New Talent	1999	Société des Auteurs et Compositeurs Dramatiques
Molière de la révélation théâtrale féminine	2000	Molière Award
Prix Mitrani	2002	International Festival of Audiovisual Programs (FIPA)
Chevalier and Officier	2002	Ordre des Arts et des Lettres
Commandeur de l’Ordre	2017	Ordre des Arts et des Lettres
