= International Centre for Theatre Research =

The International Centre for Theatre Research, sometimes also known as The International Centre for Theatre Creation, was founded in 1970 by Peter Brook and Micheline Rozan. It is often abbreviated to the acronym CIRT, as in French the group is called the Centre International de Recherche Théâtrale. The centre is a multicultural theatrical research and production company based out of the Bouffes du Nord theatre in Paris since 1974.

== History ==
=== Funding ===
Peter Brook had previously been sponsored for limited periods by Jean-Louis Barrault or the RSC (at the Roundhouse). Brook and Rozan acquired sufficient funding to sustain Brook's work for three years, working with a core company and several visiting collaborators. A budget of $1 million was established: $100,000 to set up the organization, and $300,000 for each year from 1971-1973. Money was raised from the French government and various international foundations (the Ford Foundation, the Gulbenkian Foundation and the Anderson Foundation). Money also came from the government of Iran in the form of a commission for a work at the Shiraz/Persepolis festival in 1971. Work was begun even though the full three-year budget was not secured at the outset.

=== 1971 to 1974 ===
This multinational assembly of actors, dancers, musicians and other performers travelled widely in the Middle East and Africa in the early 1970s. This was as a three-year 'pilgrimage' to answer the question "What were the common stories, the recognizable shorthands, the instant abstractions, the shared outlines of story and character with which an international group could work?" On this three-year sojourn, they produced two major works: Orghast I & II, performed in 1971 at the Shiraz Arts Festival in Iran in the Achaemenid ruins of Persepolis and Naqsh-e Rostam, and The Conference of the Birds, developed in West Africa and completed in 1974 at BAM in Brooklyn, New York.

=== Similar organisations ===
- American Educational Theatre Association (1949), publishers of Educational Theatre Journal, edited by Barnard Hewitt
- American Society for Theatre Research (1956), publishers of Theatre Survey 1960

== See also ==
- Théâtre des Bouffes du Nord

== Bibliography ==
- Kustow, Michael (2005). Peter Brook: A Biography. St. Martin's Press. ISBN 0312340346.
