= Peter Brook =

English theatre and film director (1925–2022)

Peter Brook CH CBE
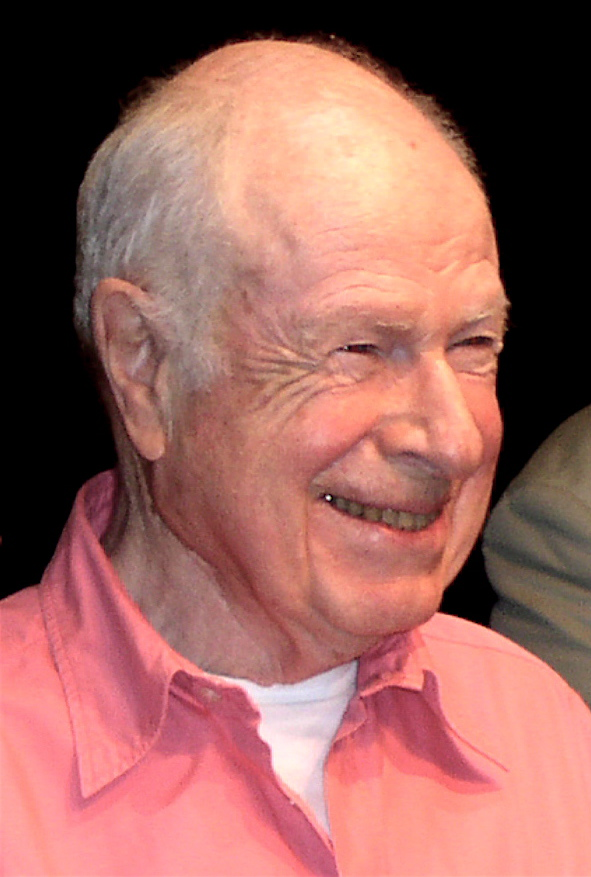
- Brook in 2009
- Born: Peter Stephen Paul Brook; 21 March 1925; Chiswick, Middlesex, England
- Died: 2 July 2022 (aged 97); Paris, France
- Education: Magdalen College, Oxford
- Occupations: Stage director, film director, co-founder of International Centre for Theatre Research
- Years active: 1943–2022
- Spouse: Natasha Parry (m. 1951; died 2015)
- Children: Irina; Simon
- Relatives: Alexis Brook (brother); Valentin Pluchek (cousin)

Peter Stephen Paul Brook (21 March 1925 – 2 July 2022) was an English theatre and film director. Widely regarded as one of the greatest and most influential figures in the history of twentieth-century theatre, (Note: Attributed to multiple sources.) he has received various accolades, including two Tony Awards, the Praemium Imperiale, the Prix Italia and the Europe Theatre Prize. In 2021, he was awarded India's Padma Shri.

Brook was based in France from the early 1970s, where he founded an international theatre company, playing in developing countries, in an approach of great simplicity. He worked first in England, from 1945 at the Birmingham Repertory Theatre, from 1947 at the Royal Opera House, and from 1962 for the Royal Shakespeare Company (RSC). With them, he directed the first English-language production in 1964 of Marat/Sade by Peter Weiss, which was transferred to Broadway in 1965 and won the Tony Award for Best Play, and Brook was named Best Director. He co-founded the International Centre for Theatre Research in 1970, and was its artistic director until 2008.

Brook's feature film credits included screen versions of plays like The Beggar's Opera (1953), Marat/Sade (1966), King Lear (1971), and The Mahabharata (1989); and literary adaptations such as Seven Days... Seven Nights (1960) with Jeanne Moreau, and Lord of the Flies (1963).

== Early years and education ==
Brook was born on 21 March 1925 in the Bedford Park area of Chiswick, the second son of Simon Brook and his wife Ida (Judelson), both Lithuanian Jewish immigrants from Latvia. The family home was at 27 Fairfax Road, Turnham Green. His elder brother Alexis became a psychiatrist and psychotherapist. His first cousin was Valentin Pluchek, chief director of the Moscow Satire Theatre.

Brook was educated at Westminster School, Gresham's School, and Magdalen College, Oxford, where he studied languages until 1945. He was excused from military service during World War II due to childhood illness.

== Career ==
=== England ===
Brook directed Marlowe's Dr Faustus, his first production, in 1943 at the Torch Theatre in London, followed at the Chanticleer Theatre in 1945 with a revival of Cocteau's The Infernal Machine. He was engaged from 1945 as stage director at the Birmingham Repertory Theatre (BRT). Hired by BRT director Barry Jackson when he was just twenty years old, Jackson described Brook as "the youngest earthquake I've known".

In 1946, Brook went to Stratford-upon-Avon to direct Love's Labour's Lost for the Stratford-Upon-Avon Festival Company at the Shakespeare Memorial Theatre, returning in 1947 to direct Romeo and Juliet . From 1947 to 1950, he was Director of Productions at the Royal Opera House in London. His work there included an effective re-staging of Puccini's La bohème using sets dating from 1899, in 1948, and a highly controversial staging of Salome by Richard Strauss with sets by Salvador Dalí in 1949. A proliferation of stage and screen work as producer and director followed. Howard Richardson's Dark of the Moon at the Ambassadors Theatre, London, in 1949 was an early, much admired production. From 1962, he was director of the Royal Shakespeare Company (RSC), together with Peter Hall. With them, he directed the first English-language production in 1964 of Marat/Sade by the German playwright Peter Weiss. It transferred to Broadway in 1965 and won the Tony Award for Best Play, and Brook was named Best Director. In 1966, they presented US, an anti-Vietnam War protest play.

==== Influences ====
Brook was influenced by the work of Antonin Artaud and his ideas for his Theatre of Cruelty.

In England, Peter Brook and Charles Marowitz undertook The Theatre of Cruelty Season (1964) at the Royal Shakespeare Company, aiming to explore ways in which Artaud's ideas could be used to find new forms of expression and retrain the performer. The result was a showing of 'works in progress' made up of improvisations and sketches, one of which was the premier of Artaud's The Spurt of Blood.

– Lee Jamieson, Antonin Artaud: From Theory to Practice, Greenwich Exchange, 2007

His greatest influence, however, was Joan Littlewood. Brook described her as "the most galvanising director in mid-20th century Britain". Brook's work was also inspired by the theories of experimental theatre of Jerzy Grotowski, Bertolt Brecht, Chris Covics and Vsevolod Meyerhold and by the works of Edward Gordon Craig, and Matila Ghyka.

Brook considered G. I. Gurdjieff his spiritual master, but was guarded about Gurdjieff's influence:

"This is something so rich that nothing would be more harmful than trying to encapsulate it in a few easy phrases." - Peter Brook

==== Collaborators ====
Brook collaborated with actors Paul Scofield as Lear, John Gielgud in Measure for Measure, and Glenda Jackson; designers Georges Wakhévitch and Sally Jacobs; and writers Ted Hughes and William Golding. Brook first encountered Wakhévitch in London when he saw the production of Jean Cocteau's ballet Le Jeune Homme et la Mort which Wakhévitch designed. Brook declared that he "was convinced that this was the designer for whom I had been waiting".

=== International Centre for Theatre Research ===
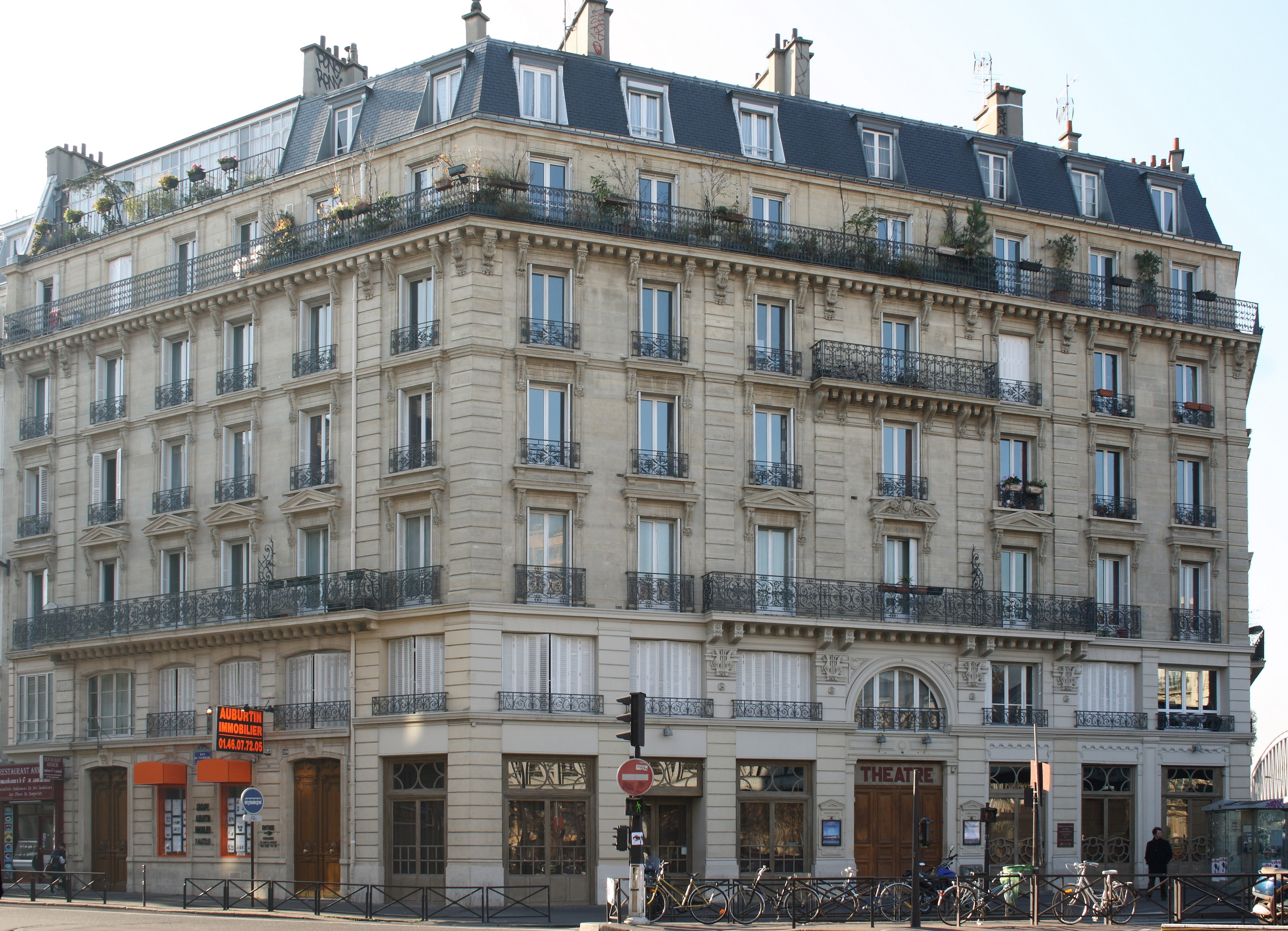
Théâtre des Bouffes du Nord, Paris

In 1971, with Micheline Rozan, Brook founded the International Centre for Theatre Research, a multinational company of actors, dancers, musicians and others, which travelled widely in the Middle East and Africa in the early 1970s. It has been based in Paris at the Bouffes du Nord theatre since 1974. The troupe played at immigrant hostels, in villages and in refugee camps, sometimes for people who had never been exposed to theatre. In 2008 he resigned as its artistic director, beginning a three-year handover to Olivier Mantei and Olivier Poubelle.

==== The Mahabharata ====
In the mid-1970s, Brook, with writer Jean-Claude Carrière, began work on adapting the Indian epic poem the Mahabharata into a stage play, which was first performed in 1985 and later developed into a televised mini series.

In a long article in 1985, The New York Times noted "overwhelming critical acclaim", and that the play "did nothing less than attempt to transform Hindu myth into universalized art, accessible to any culture". However, many post-colonial scholars have challenged the claim to universalism, accusing the play of orientalism. Gautam Dasgupta wrote that "Brook's Mahabharata falls short of the essential Indianness of the epic by staging predominantly its major incidents and failing to adequately emphasize its coterminous philosophical precepts."

In 2015, Brook returned to the world of The Mahabharata with a new Young Vic production, Battlefield, in collaboration with Jean-Claude Carrière and Marie-Hélène Estienne.

==== Tierno Bokar ====
In 2005, Brook directed Tierno Bokar, based on the life of the Malian sufi of the same name. The play was adapted for the stage by Marie-Hélène Estienne from a book by Amadou Hampâté Bâ (translated into English as A Spirit of Tolerance: The Inspiring Life of Tierno Bokar). The book and play detail Bokar's life and message of religious tolerance. Columbia University produced 44 related events, lectures, and workshops that were attended by over 3,200 people throughout the run of Tierno Bokar. Panel discussions focused on topics of religious tolerance and Muslim tradition in West Africa.

== Personal life ==
In 1951, Brook married actress Natasha Parry. They had two children: Irina, an actress and director, and Simon, a director. Parry died of a stroke in July 2015, aged 84.

=== Death ===
Brook died in Paris on 2 July 2022, aged 97.

== Works ==
Sources for Brook's productions are held by the Academy of Arts in Berlin, the Princess of Asturias Foundation, and others.

=== Shakespeare ===
Brook was fascinated with the works of Shakespeare which he produced in England and elsewhere, in films, and adaptation. In 1945, he began with King John, with designer Paul Shelving at the Birmingham Repertory Theatre. At the Shakespeare Memorial Theatre, he directed Measure for Measure in 1950 and The Winter's Tale in 1952, both with John Gielgud, followed there by Hamlet Prince of Denmark in 1955, with Paul Scofield (Hamlet), Alec Clunes (Claudius), Diana Wynyard (Gertrude), Mary Ure (Ophelia), Ernest Thesiger (Polonius), Richard Johnson (Laertes), Michael David (Horatio), and Richard Pasco (Fortinbras). Titus Andronicus, with Laurence Olivier and Vivien Leigh, was played there the same year, and also on a European tour in 1957.

Brooks's 1953 staging of King Lear, for the American TV show Omnibus, starred Orson Welles in Welles's first-ever television production.

His first work for the Royal Shakespeare Company was in 1962 King Lear, with Paul Scofield. He created a legendary version of A Midsummer Night's Dream, with designer Sally Jacobs (designer), John Kane (Puck), Frances de la Tour (Helena), Ben Kingsley (Demetrius) and Patrick Stewart (Snout) in 1970. He directed the film King Lear, again with Scofield, in 1971.

He kept producing works by Shakespeare for the Théâtre des Bouffes du Nord, in French, including Timon d'Athènes, adaptated by Jean-Claude Carrière, 1974, Mesure pour mesure in 1978 and as a film a year later, La Tempête, adaptated by Carrière, with Sotigui Kouyaté in 1990.

He directed The Tragedy of Hamlet, with Adrian Lester (Hamlet), Jeffery Kissoon (Claudius / Ghost), Natasha Parry (Gertrude), Shantala Shivalingappa (Ophelia), Bruce Myers (Polonius), Rohan Siva (Laertes / Guildenstern), Scott Handy (Horatio) and Yoshi Oida (Player King / Rosencrantz) in 2000, followed by a TV film version in 2002. In 2009, he directed a theatrical version of sonnets, Love is my Sin. In 2010, Shakespeare was among the authors for the production Warum warum (Why Why), written by Brook and Marie-Hélène Estienne after also Antonin Artaud, Edward Gordon Craig, Charles Dullin, Vsevolod Meyerhold and Zeami Motokiyo.

=== Works with RSC ===
- 1946: Love's Labour's Lost (Shakespeare Memorial Theatre)
- 1947: Romeo and Juliet (Shakespeare Memorial Theatre)
- 1950: Measure for Measure, with John Gielgud (Shakespeare Memorial Theatre)
- 1952: The Winter's Tale, with John Gielgud (Shakespeare Memorial Theatre)
- 1955: Titus Andronicus, with Laurence Olivier and Vivien Leigh (Shakespeare Memorial Theatre)
- 1957: The Tempest, with John Gielgud (Shakespeare Memorial Theatre)
- 1962: King Lear with Paul Scofield
- 1964: Marat/Sade
- 1966: US, an anti-Vietnam War protest play with The Royal Shakespeare Company, documented in the film Benefit of the Doubt
- 1970: A Midsummer Night's Dream, with John Kane (Puck), Frances de la Tour (Helena), Ben Kingsley (Demetrius) and Patrick Stewart (Snout)
- 1978: Antony and Cleopatra, with Glenda Jackson, Alan Howard, Jonathan Pryce, Alan Rickman, Juliet Stevenson, Patrick Stewart and David Suchet

=== Other major productions ===
- 1951: A Penny for a Song, by John Whiting
- 1955: Hamlet, with Paul Scofield
- 1956: A View from the Bridge, by Arthur Miller
- 1958: The Visit, with Alfred Lunt and Lynn Fontanne
- 1964: Marat/Sade, by Peter Weiss
- 1968: Oedipus with John Gielgud and Irene Worth, adapted by Ted Hughes, National Theatre
- 1971: Orghast, by Ted Hughes
- 1974: Timon d'Athènes, adaptation by Jean-Claude Carrière, Théâtre des Bouffes du Nord
- 1975: Les Iks, by Colin Turnbull, adaptation Jean-Claude Carrière, Théâtre des Bouffes
- 1977: Ubu aux Bouffes, after Alfred Jarry, Théâtre des Bouffes
- 1978: Mesure pour mesure, by William Shakespeare, Théâtre des Bouffes
- 1979: La Conférence des oiseaux (The Conference of the Birds), after Farid al-Din Attar, Festival d'Avignon; Théâtre des Bouffes
- 1979: L'Os de Mor Lam, by Birago Diop, Théâtre des Bouffes
- 1981: La Tragédie de Carmen, after Prosper Mérimée, Henri Meilhac and Ludovic Halévy, Viviane Beaumont Theater, Lincoln Center, New York City
- 1981: La Cerisaie, by Anton Chekhov, Théâtre des Bouffes
- 1984: Tchin-Tchin, by François Billetdoux, directed with Maurice Bénichou, with Marcello Mastroianni, Théâtre Montparnasse
- 1985: Le Mahabharata (The Mahabharata), Festival d'Avignon
- 1988: The Cherry Orchard by Anton Chekhov, Majestic Theatre, Brooklyn
- 1989: Woza Albert!, by Percy Mtawa, Mbongeni Ngema and Barney Simon
- 1990: La Tempête, by William Shakespeare, adaptation by Jean-Claude Carrière, with Sotigui Kouyaté, Théâtre des Bouffes
- 1992: Impressions de Pelléas, after Claude Debussy, Théâtre des Bouffes
- 1993: L'Homme Qui, after The Man Who Mistook His Wife for a Hat by Oliver Sacks
- 1995: Qui est là, after texts by Antonin Artaud, Bertolt Brecht, Edward Gordon Craig, Vsevolod Meyerhold, Konstantin Stanislavski and Zeami Motokiyo
- 1995: Oh les beaux jours, by Samuel Beckett
- 1998: Je suis un phénomène, after prodigieuse mémoire by Alexander Luria
- 1998: Don Giovanni by Mozart, for the 50th Festival International d'Art Lyrique d'Aix-en-Provence
- 1999: Le Costume, by Can Themba
- 2000: Hamlet by William Shakespeare, with Adrian Lester
- 2002: Far Away, by Caryl Churchill
- 2002: La Mort de Krishna, extract from Mahabharata de Vyasa, adaptation by Jean-Claude Carrière and Marie-Hélène Estienne
- 2003: Ta main dans la mienne, by Carol Rocamora
- 2004: Tierno Bokar, after Vie et enseignement de Tierno Bokar-Le sage de Bandiagara by Amadou Hampâté Bâ, with Sotigui Kouyaté
- 2004: Le Grand Inquisiteur, after The Brothers Karamazov by Dostoyevsky
- 2006: Sizwe Banzi est mort, by Athol Fugard, John Kani and Winston Ntshona, Festival d'Avignon
- 2008: Fragments, after Samuel Beckett
- 2009: Love is my sin, sonnets by William Shakespeare
- 2009: 11 and 12, after Vie et enseignement de Tierno Bokar-Le Sage de Bandiagara by Amadou Hampâté Bâ
- 2010: Warum warum, by Peter Brook and Marie-Hélène Estienne after Antonin Artaud, Edward Gordon Craig, Charles Dullin, Vsevolod Meyerhold, Zeami Motokiyo and William Shakespeare
- 2011: A Magic Flute, an adaptation of Mozart's The Magic Flute, directed with Marie-Hélène Estienne, composer Franck Krawczyk to positive reviews at the Gerald W. Lynch Theater of John Jay College.
- 2013: The Suit, after Can Themba's tale, directed with Marie-Hélène Estienne and Franck Krawczyk
- 2015: Battlefield, from The Mahabharata and Jean-Claude Carrière's play, adapted and directed by Peter Brook and Marie-Hélène Estienne
- 2018: The Prisoner, written and directed by Peter Brook and Marie-Hélène Estienne
- 2019: 'Why?' . Written and directed by Peter Brook and Marie-Hélène Estienne

=== Filmography ===
- 1953: The Beggar's Opera
- 1960: Moderato Cantabile (UK title Seven Days... Seven Nights) with Jeanne Moreau and Jean-Paul Belmondo
- 1963: Lord of the Flies
- 1967: Ride of the Valkyrie
- 1967: Marat/Sade
- 1968: Tell Me Lies
- 1971: King Lear
- 1979: Meetings with Remarkable Men
- 1979: Mesure pour mesure
- 1982: La Cerisaie
- 1983: La Tragédie de Carmen, three different versions, with successively in the title roles, Hélène Delavault, Zehava Gal and Eva Saurova
- 1989: The Mahabharata
- 2002: The Tragedy of Hamlet (TV)
- 2012: The Tightrope (documentary film, co-written and directed by Simon Brook)

== Awards and honours ==
=== Awards ===
- Tony Award for Best Direction of a Play for Marat/Sade, 1966
- Tony Award for Best Direction of a Play for A Midsummer Night's Dream, 1971
- Shakespeare Prize by the Hamburg-based Alfred Toepfer Foundation, 1973
- Brigadier Prize, 1975, for Timon of Athens
- Grand Prix Dominique, 1981
- Emmy Award, 1984, for La tragédie de Carmen
- Prix Italia, 1984
- Europe Theatre Prize, 1989
- International Emmy Award, 1990, for The Mahabharata
- Kyoto Prize in Arts and Philosophy, 1991
- Praemium Imperiale, 1997
- Dan David Prize, 2005
- The Ibsen Award for 2008, first winner of the prize of NOK 2.5 mill (approximately £200,000).
- Critics' Circle Award for Distinguished Service to the Arts 2008

=== Honours ===
- Commander of the Order of the British Empire, 1965
- Induction into the American Theater Hall of Fame, 1983
- Honorary DLitt, University of Birmingham, 1990
- Honorary Fellow of Magdalen College, Oxford, 1991
- Honorary DLitt, University of Strathclyde, 1990
- Honorary DLitt, University of Oxford, 1994
- Officier de l'Ordre de la Légion d'honneur (France), 1995
- Member of the Order of the Companions of Honour, 1998 (He previously declined a knighthood.)
- President's Medal by the British Academy, 2011
- Commandeur de la Légion d'honneur (France), 2013
- Princess of Asturias Award in Arts, 2019
- Padma Shri (India), 2021

=== Europe Theatre Prize ===
In 1989 he was awarded the II Europe Theatre Prize in Taormina, with the following motivation:

In the field of world theatre of the second half of our century, the long theoretical and practical work of Peter Brook has – without any doubt – unrivalled merits, which are – broadly speaking – unique. Brook's first merit is that of having always pursued an authentic research outside the sterile 'routine' of what he has defined as 'Deadly Theatre'. Brook's second merit is that of having been able to use different languages of contemporary scene; in the same way he has been able to unify the variety of languages. Brook's third merit is that of having discovered and given back a bright vitality to some great cultural and theatrical heritages which hitherto had remained distant from us both in space and time. Nevertheless – without any doubt – Brook's noblest and most constant merit is that of having never separated the strictness and finesse of research from the necessity that the result of those ones would have had the audience as their receiver and interlocutor; the audience which is also requested to renew its habits.

== Published works ==
- — (1968). The Empty Space. Penguin. ISBN 978-0-684-82957-9.
- — (1988). The Shifting Point. UK: Methuen Drama. ISBN 0-413-61280-5.
- — (1991). Le Diable c'est l'ennui. Actes Sud. ISBN 2-86943-321-2. OCLC 708323104.
- — (1993). There Are No Secrets. Methuen Drama. ISBN 0-413-68140-8. OCLC 29389617.
- — (1995). The Open Door. Theatre Communications. ISBN 978-1-55936-102-6.
- — (1998). Threads of Time: Recollections. Counterpoint. ISBN 978-1-887178-35-8.
- — (1999). Evoking Shakespeare. Nick Hern Books (2nd ed. 2002). ISBN 1-55936-169-7. OCLC 40830170.
- Brook, Peter; et al. (Alessandro Martinez and Georges Banu) (2004). La voie de Peter Brook [Peter Brook's journey] (in French and English). Translated by Tucciarelli, C.; Watkins, B.; Herbert, I. Premio Europa per il Teatro. ISBN 978-8-89010-141-0.
- Brook, Peter (2013). The Quality of Mercy: Reflections on Shakespeare. Nick Hern Books. ISBN 978-1-84842-261-2.
- — (2017). Tip of The Tongue: Reflections on Language and Meaning. Nick Hern Books. ISBN 978-1-84842-672-6.
- — (2019). Playing by Ear: Reflections on Sound and Music. Nick Hern Books. ISBN 978-1-84842-831-7.

== See also ==
- List of English speaking theatre directors in the 20th and 21st centuries
- Theatre of the United Kingdom
- History of theatre
