= Ahmad Shah's Bahmani Mausoleum =

Building near Bidar in Karnataka, India

Coordinates: 17°54′55″N 77°33′41″E

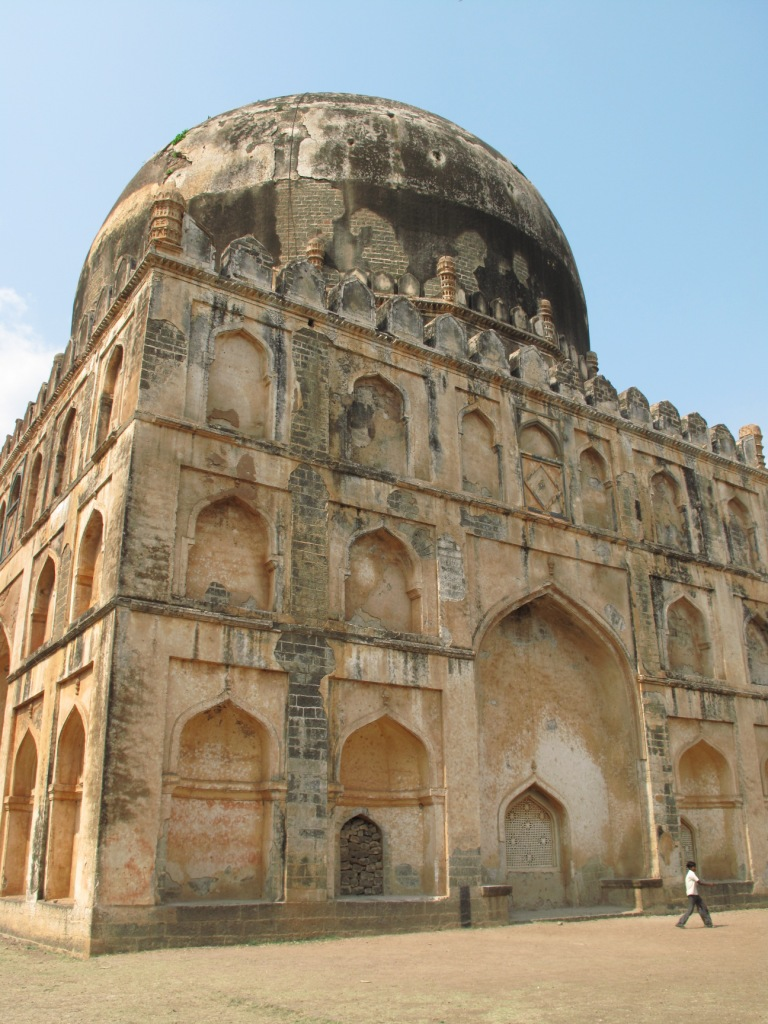
Mausoleum of Sultan Ahmad Shah

The Mausoleum of Sultan Ahmad Shah Bahmani, (r. 825–839 AH / 1422–1436 CE) is located in the necropolis of the Bahmani sultanas in Ashtur, which is approximately 2.5km northeast of Bidar in Karnataka, India. The tomb is dated on the epigraphical and grounds to the date of the Sultan's death, 839/1436, and is the earliest and the tallest in the cemetery besides the tomb of Alaa al Din Bahmani.

== Patronage ==
The Bahmani dynasty was, like most other contemporary Indian dynasties, originally Sunni. However Ahmad Shah was Shi'a. His conversion was purely personal matter; he did not force it on any of his subjects. Early in his reign he earned the title of Vali or "saint", after an incident when his prayer for rain was answered, bringing to an end a famine that caused much suffering to his kingdom.

Ahmad Shah was aware of the fame of the Shi'a saint, Shah Ni'mat-Allah of Mahan, which is near Kirman in the southern Iran. Accordingly, Ahmad Shah sent Sheikh Habib-Allah Junaidi, Mir Shams-al-din of Qum and others to Kirman to act as his representatives in requesting the presence of the saint's disciples.

On that account Shah Ni'mat Allah sent Shah Mulla Qutub-al-din of Kirman in return with a box that fulfilled Ahmad Shah's recurring dream. Moreover, Shah Ni'mat Allah described Ahmad Shah in his letter "the greatest of kings Shihab-al-din Ahmad Shah, the Vali" . The relations got closer and stronger when Sultan Ahmad Shah sent a second mission to Shah Ni'mat Allah asking him to send one of his sons to India to act as spiritual guide. The Sheikh's grand son, Mir Nur-Allah was pleasurably received and was given the title by the Sultan as Malik -al- Mashaikh.

After the arrival of Mir Nur-Allah the village of Ni'matabad and a Mosque were established on the banks of the Manjira River and Sultan Ahmad Shah awarded him the marriage of one of his daughters.

== Architecture ==
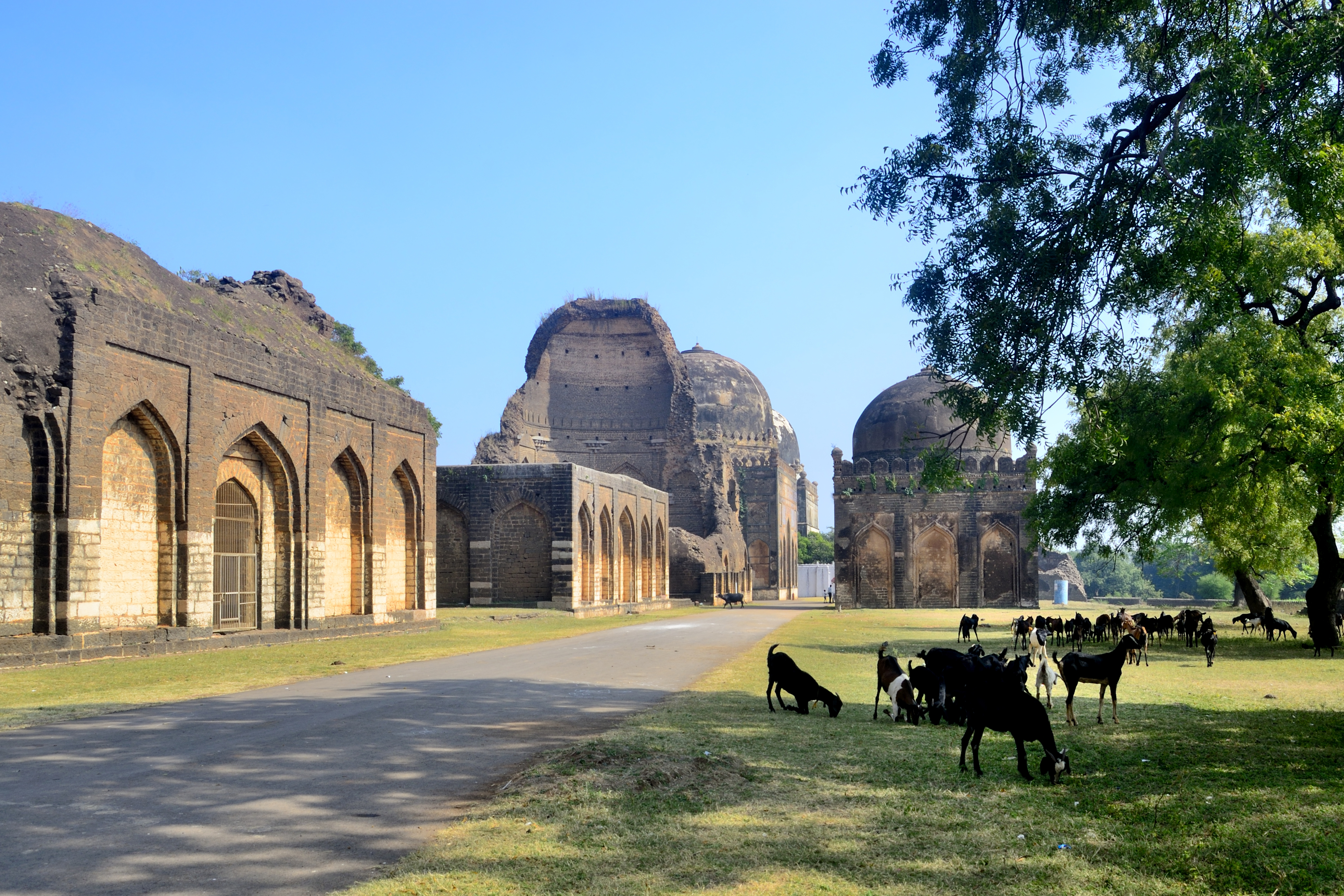
Ruins of Bahmani tombs

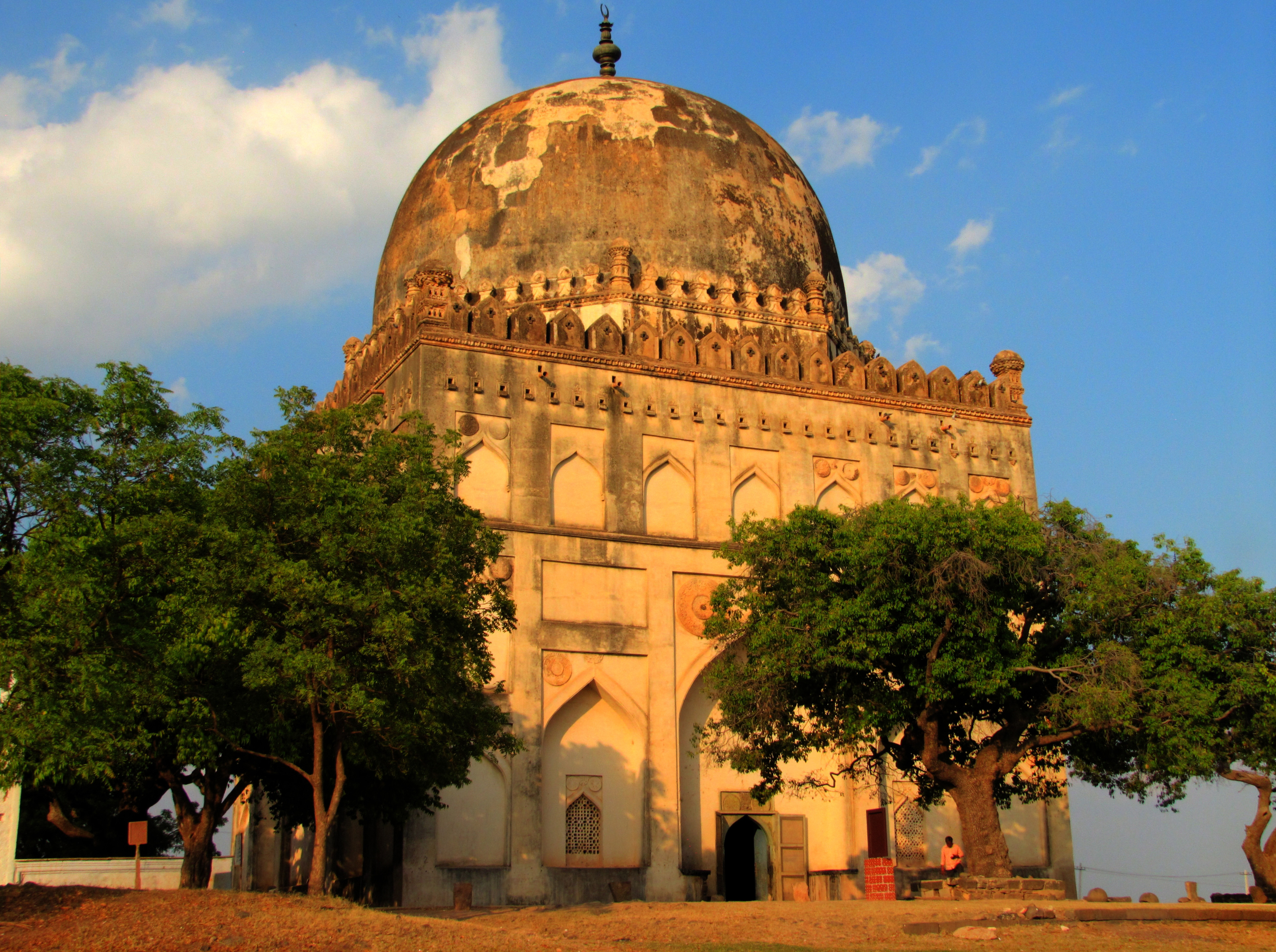
Tomb of Sultan Ahmad Shah

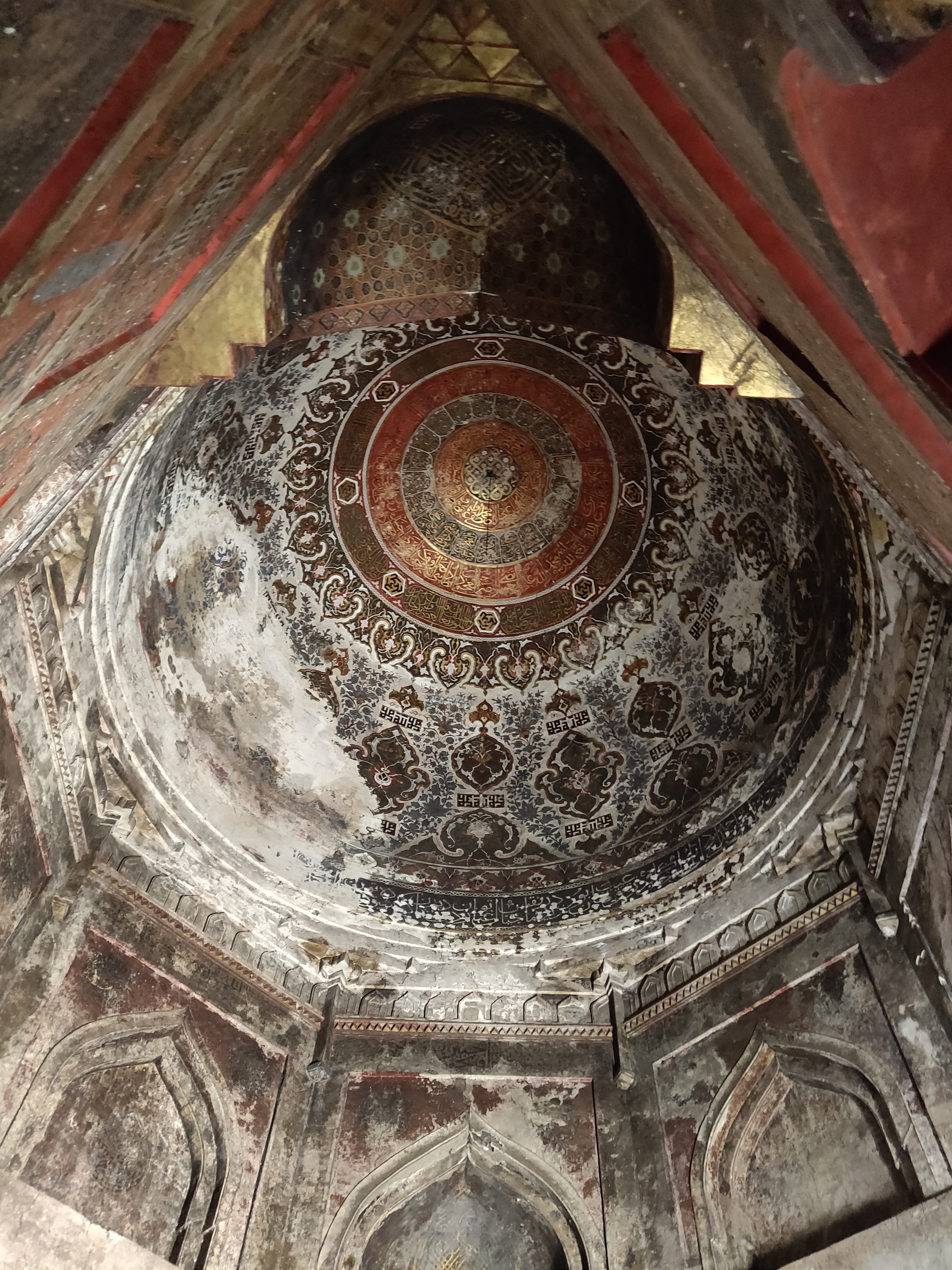
Concentric circles

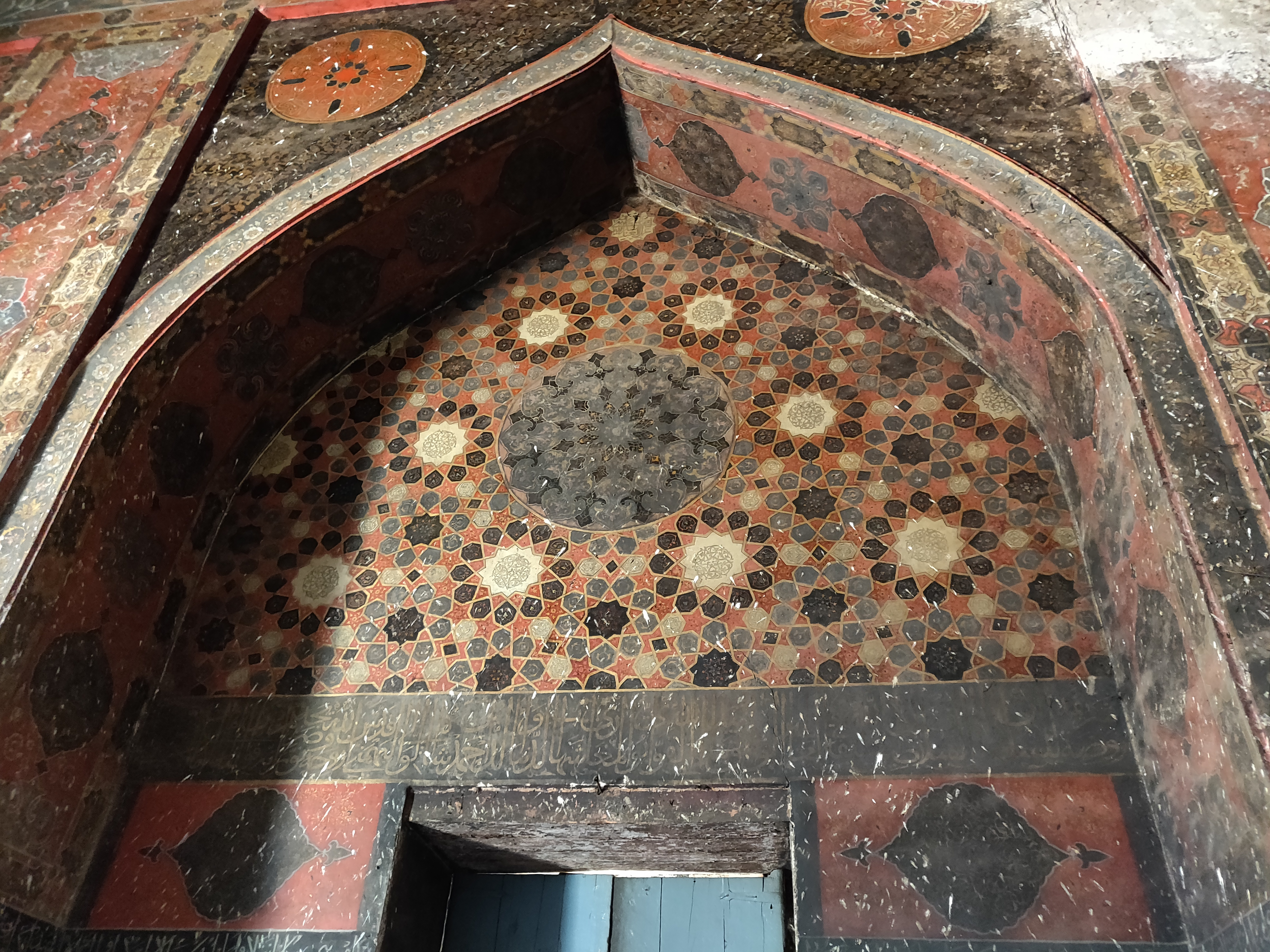
Wall decoration

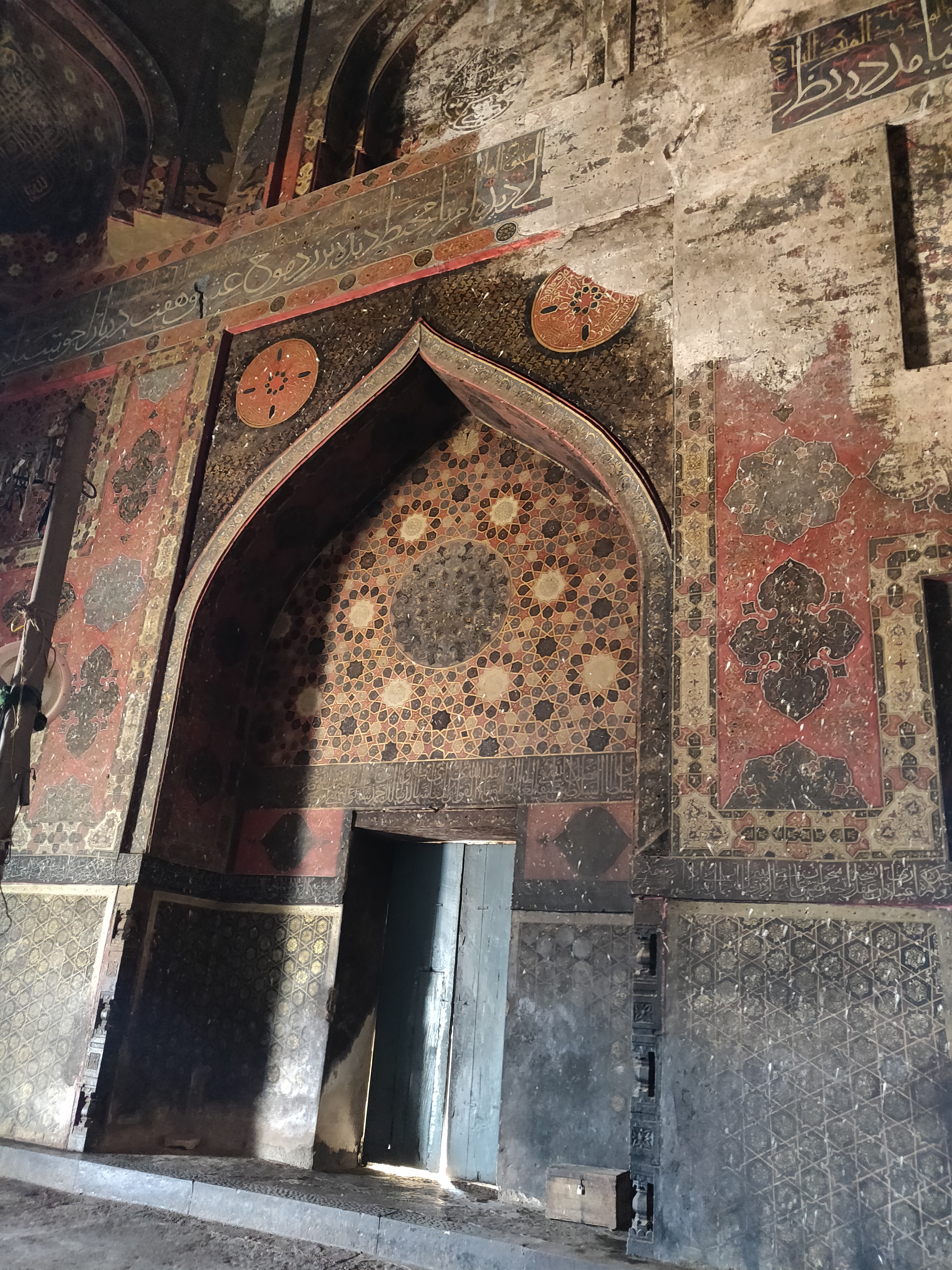
Calligraphy and vegetal motifs

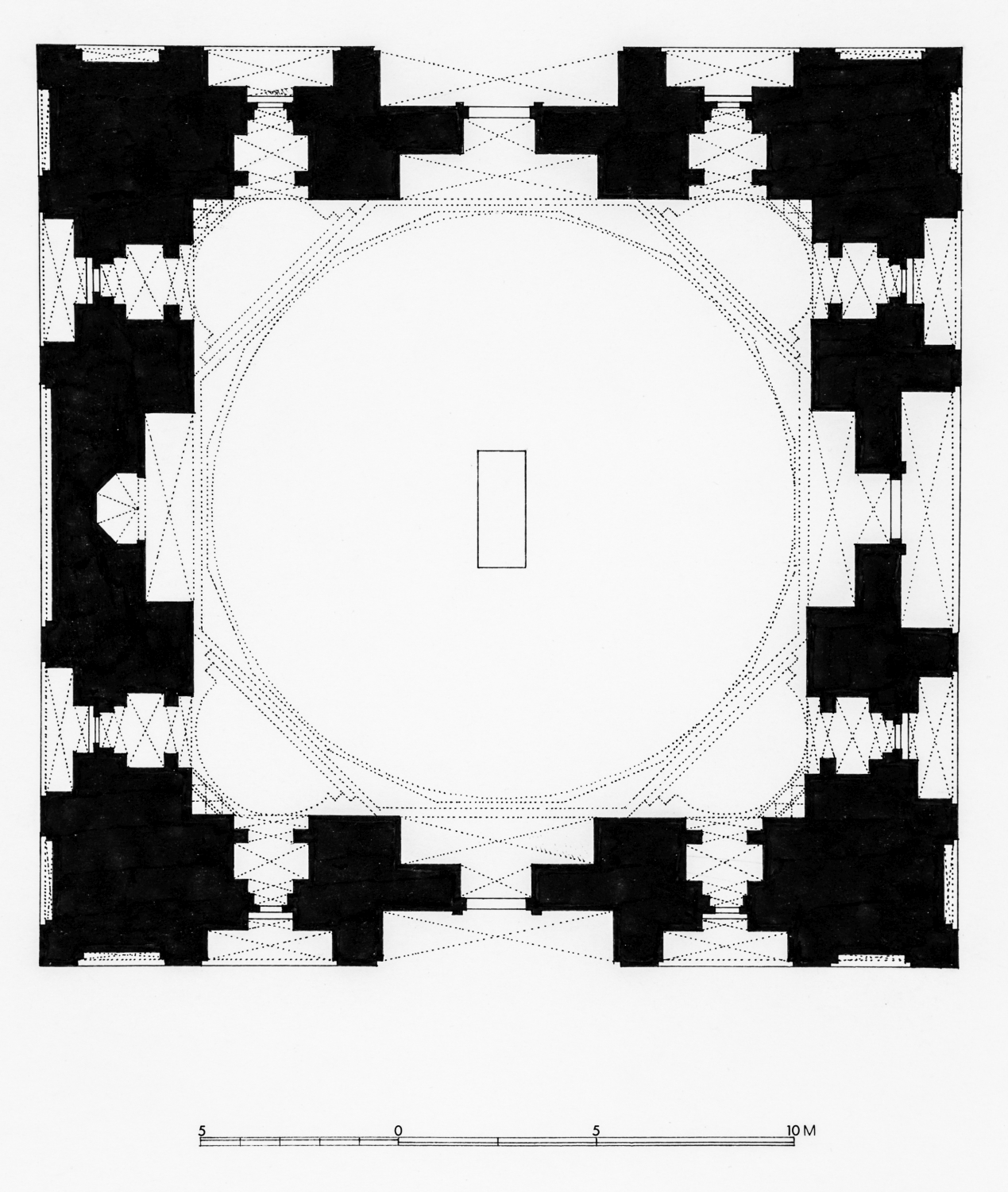
Ground plan of the Mausoleum

Sultan Ahmad's mausoleum, contains evident proof that he was Shi'a. A square based plan is followed by an octagonal zone of transition that is topped by a hemispherical dome. The outer walls approximately 23.4696 m high, and the inner walls 15.8496 m high. The facade of the mausoleum consists of three tiers of pointed and arched niches, seven at the upper and four on the lower two tiers, differentiating it from the two rows of arches in the earlier mausoleums.

The exterior has superb stucco decoration in the spandrels of the doors on each side. The windows with Jalis ornamenting the exterior of the tomb. The roof has crenulations with finials on the four corners. The Ayat-al- Kursi (The Throne Verse) in stucco is the only surviving inscription on the mausoleum's exterior.

The interior zone of transition is composed of squinches leading to a twenty-four sided base.

The dome is lavishly adorned with inscriptions . They are organized in concentric circles or silsilah, the inner most (calling down) blessings and prayers on Prophet Muhammad, his daughter Fatima and the twelve Shi'a Imams: Ali al- Murtada, Hasan, Husain, Ali Zayn- al- Abidin, Baqir, Muhammad Ja'far, Musa Kazim, Ali b Musa al-Rida, Muhammad Taqi, Ali al-Naqi, Hasan al- Askari and Muhammad al-Mahdi. The first three caliphs are not mentioned in any of the inscriptions in the mausoleum.

Moving outwards, the second and third circles include the names of the holy men, each one starting with the name of prophet Muhammad and ending with Shah Ni'mat- Allah. It is highly probable that one portrays the natural and the other the spiritual line of heredity of Ni'mat- Allah from the prophet.

The walls are painted with exquisitely colored vegetal motifs that appeared in the stylized cartouches, in addition to paintings of vases with cypress trees coming out of them and calligraphy in a myriad of fashion and styles. The major recessed arches on the four walls are painted in arrangement of pentagons displayed around stars.

The calligraphy is mostly in gold thuluth or naskh in varied sizes; they are based on a ground of contrasting colors; dark blue, vermilion, black, turquoise, gold and green. The names of 'Ali, Muhammad and Allah, frequently in Timurid decoration, are frequently written in square Kufic.

The signature of the painter named Shukrullah Qazvini hovers in a star near the top of an arch in the eastern door, it's inscribed over a white background in a dark writing "al-abd Shukruallah al-Qazvini-ye Naqqash". His nisba "Qazvin" shows that he originated in Iran, which strengthens the idea of the tomb being a result of collaboration among foreign and local artists, patrons and mostly Sufi elites.

== Shi'a symbolism ==
The Persian and the Arabic poetry of the Sufi Sheikh Ni'mat-Allah which is inscribed inside the mausoleum mediates around the term 'ain, a term that conveys various meanings in both Languages Persian and Arabic. 'Ain has several definitions such as eye, sight, vision or look and also a source of water or a fountain. On a reasonable level, Ahmad Shah is commemorated for knowing the secret of the world's ample water source: rain.

Talismans tilism play a large part in the overall decorative program of the Mausoleum, particularly in the form of calligraphy.

Sufis were acknowledged for their collections of talismanic objects, one of which was specimens of calligraphy. Thus, it reinforces the idea of Sufism and Calligraphy were congenial in Bidar, as indicated by Ya'qub bin Hasan Siraj Shirazi's Tuhfat al- Muhibbin (Bounty of the Two Lovers, 1454), a calligraphic monograph that was designated for Muhibb al-Din, son of Sheikh Ni'mat-Allah. The lines chosen for the inscriptions are depicted in a way that creates a connection between the visitor of the mausoleum and Ahmad Shah, as if he is addressing the words of Shah Ni'mat-Allah to the visitors; welcoming them to his shrine, the lamp, the emerald coloured carpet, the dome, and the paintings where the whole of them is visible to the viewer.

The arcane power of the calligraphy in the zones of transition is developed by other ways in which it is reflective, the repeated knotted calligraphy adorning them created a mirror effect that occurs both internally and beyond the space of the mausoleum.

== Inscriptions ==
The arrangement of the inscriptions inside Ahmad Shah's mausoleum sync perfectly with their visual context, indicating spatial poetry. Demonstrated by the wall paintings that hold recognizable depictions. Furthermore, calligraphic talismans provide regenerated meanings to the landscape (water sources). These diverse features altogether created a deeply affective and mystical experience in which the poetry fulfilled a space and a visual context gave the poetry new meanings.
