= Bibi Hayati =

- Born: early 19th century Bam, Kerman Province, Persia (present-day Iran)
- Died: c. 1853; Kerman Province, Persia (present-day Iran)
- Other names: Bibi Hayati Kermani; Bibi Jan Hayati; Bibi Hayat Bami
- Occupation(s): Poet, mystic
- Notable work: Divan-i Hayati (collection of ghazals and Saqi Namah)
- Movement: Ni'matullahi Sufi order
- Spouse: Nur 'Ali Shah (Ni'matullahi Sufi master)
- Children: 1

Bibi Hayati (also known as Bibi Hayati Kermani or Bibi Jan Hayati; died c. 1853) was a 19th-century Persian Sufi poet and mystic from the Kerman province of Iran. She belonged to the Ni'matullāhī Sufi order and is known for her passionate ghazals expressing divine love.

== Biography ==
Hayati was born in the early 19th century into a noble family with a long tradition of Sufism, likely in the town of Bam in Kerman province, Persia (modern-day Iran). She received early spiritual guidance from her brother and was later initiated into the Ni'matullahi Sufi order by the master Nur 'Ali Shah, whom she married. They had one child together.

At her husband's encouragement, she composed and published poetry, overcoming initial reluctance due to her gender; Nur 'Ali Shah reportedly affirmed that in the realm of love and Sufism, she had attained the status of "manhood" through her devotion. Hayati was known not only for her spiritual accomplishments but also for her practical virtues, including caring for and feeding the Sufi community.

Bibi Hayati compiled a divan (collection) of ghazals and other poems characterized by erotic-mystical imagery and expressions of intense longing for the divine beloved, typical of Persian Sufi literature. Her poetry demonstrates familiarity with both exoteric Islamic principles and esoteric Sufi gnosticism, as well as elements of Persian music and sama' (spiritual audition).

Notable poems include her Saqi Namah (Ode to the Cupbearer) and ghazals translated into English, such as Is it the night of power.

== Legacy ==
During her lifetime, Hayati gained recognition for her mystical poetry. In modern times, a museum in Kerman, the Hayati Museum, is named in her honor.
