= Javad Nurbakhsh =

Master of the Nimatullahi Sufi Order (1926–2008)

Javad Nurbakhsh (Nūr 'Ali Shāh)
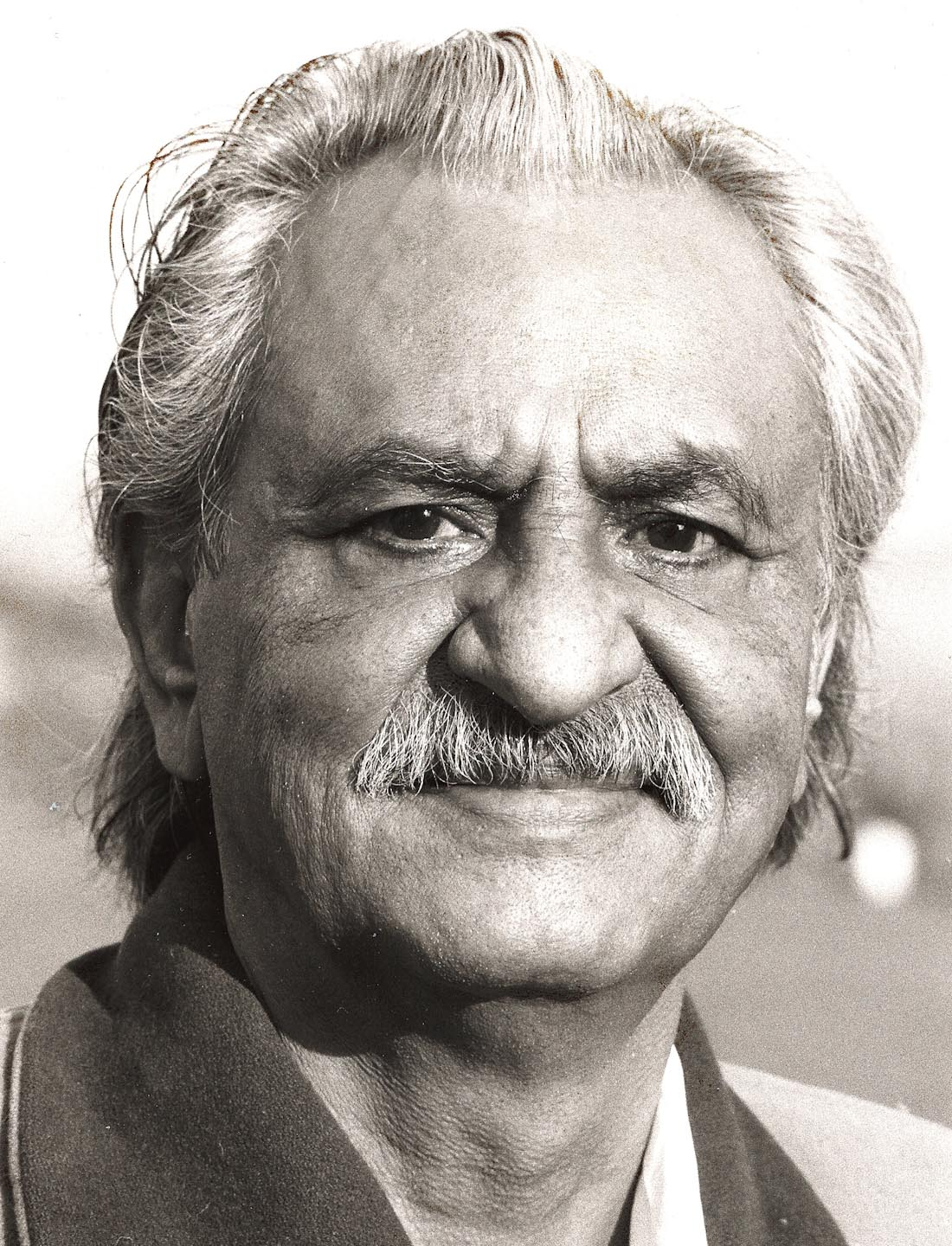
- Born: 10 December 1926; Kerman, Iran
- Died: 10 October 2008 (aged 81); Banbury, Oxfordshire, England
- Occupations: Sufi Master, psychiatrist, hospital director, writer
- Spouse: Parvaneh Daneshvar Nurbakhsh
- Children: 3 sons, 2 daughters
- Website: www.nimatullahi.org

Javad Nurbakhsh (Persian: جواد نوربخش; 10 December 1926 – 10 October 2008) was the Master (pir) of the Nimatullahi Sufi Order from 1953 until his death. He was also a psychiatrist and a successful writer in the fields of both psychiatry and Sufi mysticism.

== Life ==
=== Iran ===
Nurbakhsh was born in the city of Kerman, Iran on 10 December 1926. He was initiated into the Nimatullahi Sufi order at the age of sixteen and appointed its sheikh at twenty. Nurbakhsh studied at University of Tehran's medical school, receiving his doctorate in psychiatry in 1952, from the Sorbonne. He began his professional career as a medical doctor at the age of 26 when he became head of a local hospital in the southeastern town of Bam, Iran. In the following year he succeeded his master, Mo'nes 'Ali Shah Zo'r-Riyasateyn, as master of the Nimatullahi, taking the Sufi sobriquet of Nur 'Ali Shah.

As well as his revival of the Nimatullahi Sufi Order and his many written works, Nurbakhsh became one of Iran's foremost psychiatrists. Nurbakhsh believed that all are equal in love. According to his obituary in Payvan's Iran news, he "promoted the creed of fraternity and equality of all human beings, regardless of gender, race, nationality and religion."

=== Emigrating to the West ===
Nurbakhsh left Iran following the Iranian revolution in 1979, first for the United States, where he established several Sufi centers known as khanaqahs, then moved to Britain in 1983 and settled there. Dr. Nurbakhsh's work in reviving and organizing Sufism through the Nimatullahi order continued until his death in Britain in 2008.

== Career ==
=== Psychiatry ===
After obtaining his psychiatric degree from the Sorbonne, Nurbakhsh was appointed professor of psychiatry at the Tehran University school of medicine, a position which he held until he retired, along with that of director of the Iranian Medical Council, president of the Iranian Association of Psychiatrists, and head of the Ruzbeh Psychiatric Hospital. He was also an honorary member of the American Psychiatrists' Association. Nurbakhsh also supervised the World Congress of Psychiatry for the World Psychiatric Association when it was for first hosted in Iran.

He produced 37 scientific works in the field of psychiatry, as author, editor and translator, along with many articles in scientific journals and a compendium of instructional brochures for the use of researchers, professors and students.

=== Sufism ===
Javad Nūrbakhsh
- Title: Nūr 'Ali Shāh
- Main interest: Dhikr
- Notable idea(s): Qutb, Tawhid, Mysticism, Sufi poetry, History of Sufism

Religious life
- Religion: Islam
- Creed: Sufism

Senior posting
- Influenced by: Shāh Ni'matullāh Walī, Bayazid Bastami, Abū-Sa'īd Abul-Khayr, Attar of Nishapur, Rumi, Sanai

According to the Islamic scholar Henry Corbin, Nurbakhsh was known for his "prodigious activity" in the publication of classical Sufi texts. By 1979, when he left Iran, he had published some eighty books.

He wrote the two part article What is Sufism? Sufism and Psychoanalysis, published in The International Journal of Social Psychiatry, which fall into the category of Sufi psychology, bringing together his twin interests in the fields of Sufism and psychiatry.

Prior to 1979, according to biographical material on the Order's web site, "he established 70 Sufi centres in most of the major cities and towns of Iran, all set up as charitable organisations according to civil and Islamic law. A great number of these have since been expropriated under the current regime." The first of the Order's Sufi centres outside Iran was set up in San Francisco in 1975. Many more were set up outside Iran after his flight into exile in 1979.

== Death and succession ==
Nurbakhsh died in his retreat in the English countryside near the town of Banbury, Oxfordshire, where he spent his final years and is buried.

He was succeeded by his son, Alireza Nurbakhsh, who holds a PhD in philosophy from the University of Wisconsin and is a practising lawyer in London. His Sufi sobriquet is Reza 'Ali Shah.

He was survived by his widow, Parvaneh Daneshvar Nurbakhsh, three sons and two daughters.

== Selected Statements by Nurbakhsh on Sufism ==
The basis of Sufism is consideration of the hearts and feelings of others. If you haven't the will to gladden someone's heart, then at least beware lest you hurt someone's heart, for on our path, no sin exists but this.

Sufism is a path towards the Truth where there are no provisions except Love. Its method is to look solely in one direction, and its objective is God.

True lovers prefer the Beloved's desires to their own, being content with whatever the Beloved desires - 'be it cure or pain, union or separation.'

... if you encounter a human being who claims to be a Sufi and behaves contrary to the human code of ethics, do not ask, "What kind of Sufi is this?" Rather, it would be better to ask, "What kind of person would this have been had he not been a Sufi?

The capital of the Path is, in truth, nothing other than sincerity. Sincerity has been defined as `showing yourself as you really are' and `being inwardly what you show yourself to be'.

== Selected bibliography ==
- In the Paradise of the Sufis, Khaniqah Nimatullahi Publications, London (1979)
- Divani Nurbakhsh, Sufi Poetry, Khaniqah Nimatullahi Publications, London (1980)
- The Truths of Love: Sufi Poetry, Khaniqah Nimatullahi Publications, London (1982)
- The Gnosis of the Sufis (Ma‘arif-i Ṣufiyya), in five volumes, Khaniqah Nimatullahi Publications, London (1983)
- Jesus in the Eyes of the Sufis, Khaniqah Nimatullahi Publications, London (1983)
- Sufi Women, Khaniqah Nimatullahi Publications, London (1983)
- Spiritual Poverty in Sufism, Khaniqah Nimatullahi Publications, London (1984)
- The Great Satan, ‘Eblis’, Khaniqah Nimatullahi Publications, London (1986)
- Sufi Symbolism (Farhang-i Nurbakhsh) , in 16 volume encyclopedia of mystical terminology, Khaniqah Nimatullahi Publications, London (1990-2003)
- Dogs from a Sufi Point of View, Khaniqah Nimatullahi Publications, London (1992)
- In the Tavern of Ruin, Khaniqah Nimatullahi Publications, London (1992)
- The Psychology of Sufism, Khaniqah Nimatullahi Publications, London (1992)
- Masters of the Path: A History of the Nimatullahi Order, Khaniqah Nimatullahi Publications, London (1993)
- Traditions of the Prophet, Volumes I and II, trilingual texts (Arabic, Persian and English), Khaniqah Nimatullahi Publications, London (1993)
- Discourses on the Sufi Path, Khaniqah Nimatullahi Publications, London (1996)
- The Path, Khaniqah Nimatullahi Publications, London (2003)
- Handbook of Psychiatry (30 Volumes), volume one, volume two, volume three, volume Four, volume Five, volume Six, volume Seven, volume Eight, volume Nine, volume Ten, volume Eleven, volume Twelve, volume Thirteen, volume Fourteen, volume Fifteen, volume Sixteen, volume Seventeen, volume Eighteen, volume Nineteen, volume Twenty, volume Twenty-one, volume Twenty-two, volume Twenty-three, volume Twenty-four, volume Twenty-five, volume Twenty-six, volume Twenty-seven, volume Twenty-eight, volume Twenty-nine, volume Thirty. (2019)
