= Shah Nematollah Vali Shrine =

Mausoleum in Mahan, Iranian national heritage site

- آرامگاه شاه نعمت‌ الله‌ ولی
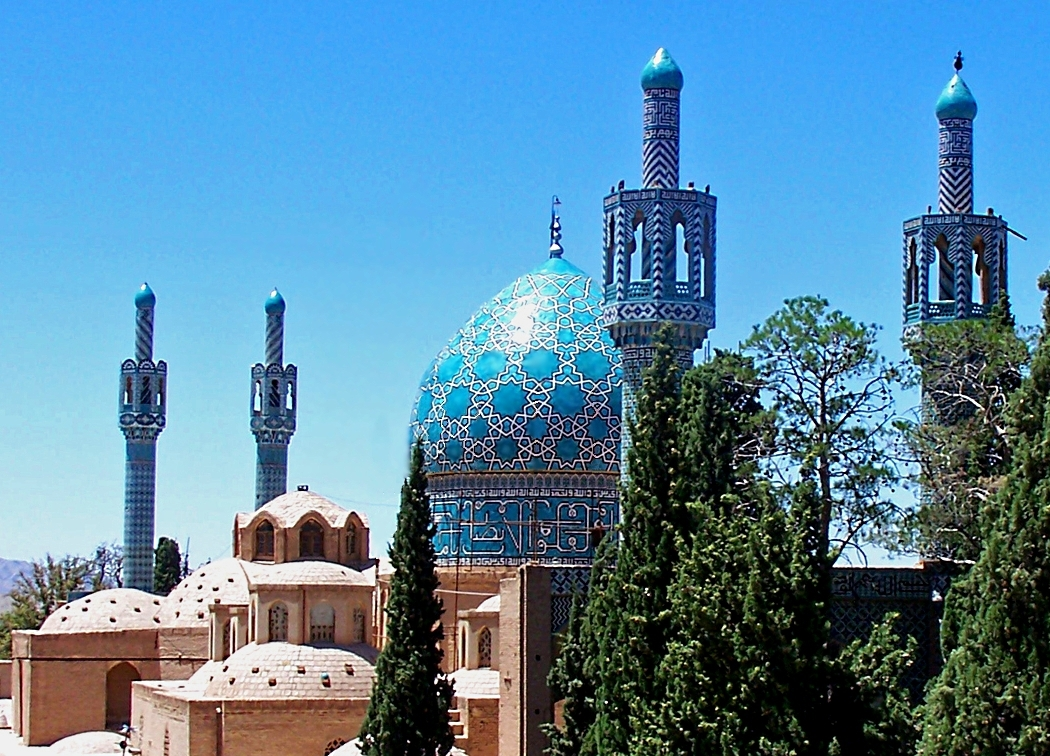

Religion
- Affiliation: Islam
- Rite: Sunni and Shia
- Ecclesiastical or organisational status: Shrine

Location
- Location: Mahan, Kerman Province
- Country: Iran
- Interactive map of Shah Nematollah Vali Shrine
- Coordinates: 30°3′35″N 57°17′24″E

Architecture
- Type: Mosque architecture
- Completed: 1436 CE

Specifications
- Dome: One (maybe more)
- Minaret: Two
- Iran National Heritage List
- Official name: Mausoleum of Shah Nematollah Vali
- Type: Mausoleum
- Designated: 1932
- Reference no.: 132
- Conservation organization: Cultural Heritage, Handicrafts and Tourism Organization of Iran

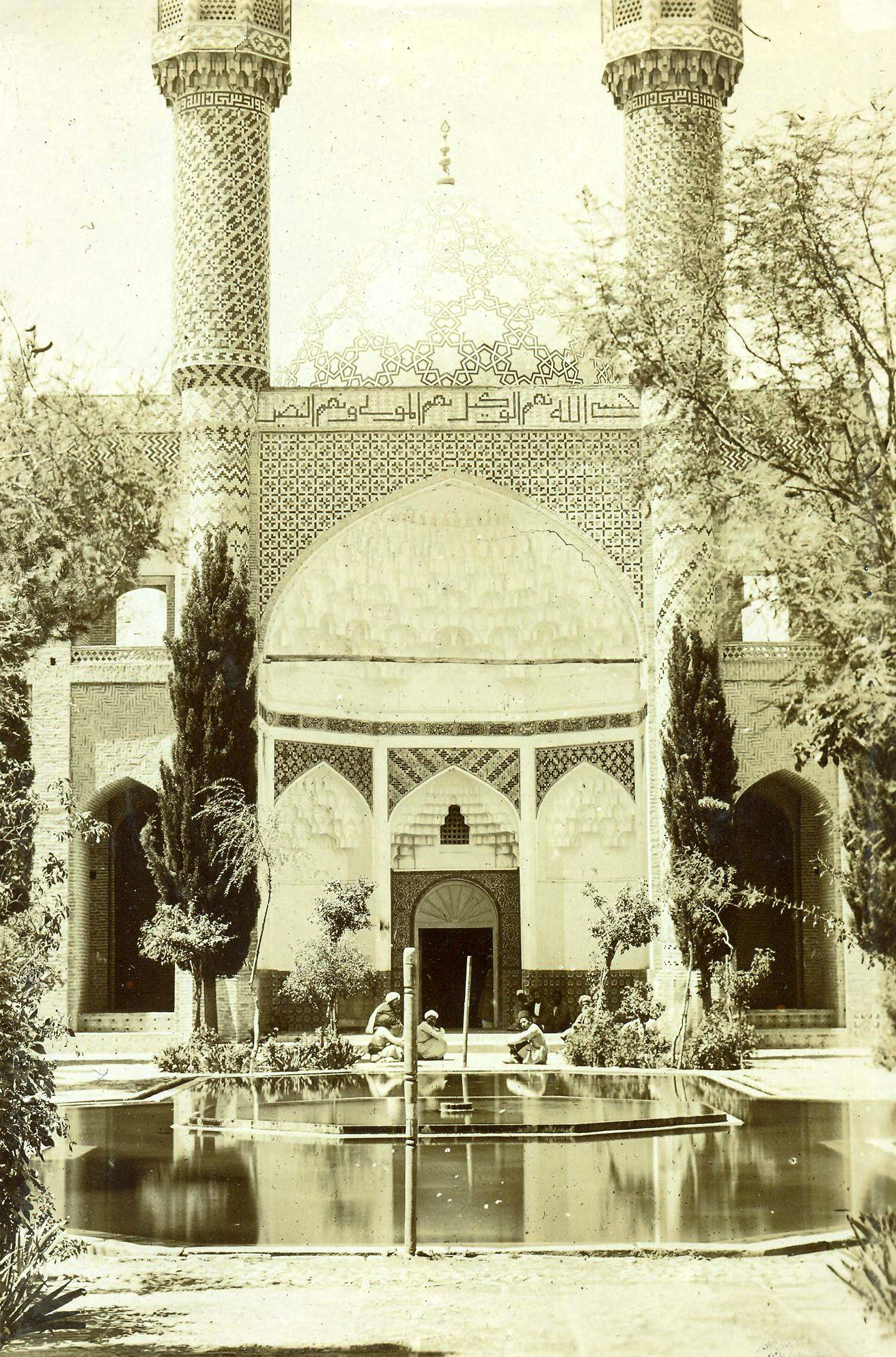
The shrine in Qajar era

The Shah Nematollah Vali Shrine (Persian: آرامگاه شاه نعمت‌ الله‌ ولی) is a historical complex, located in Mahan, Kerman Province, Iran, which contains the mausoleum of Shah Nematollah Vali, the renowned Iranian mystic and poet. Shah Nematollah Vali died in 1431 aged over 100. In 1436 a shrine was erected in his honor and became a pilgrimage site; with the attention of successive rulers contributing various additions over the centuries.

== History ==
The shrine complex comprises four courtyards, a reflecting pool, a mosque and twin minarets covered with turquoise tiles from the bottom up to the cupola. The earliest construction is attributed to the Bahmanid ruler Ahmed I Vali who erected the sanctuary chamber in 1436. Shah Abbas I undertook extensions and renovations in 1601, including reconstruction of the tiled blue dome, described as "one of the most magnificent architectural masterpieces in old Persia". During the Qajar era, the site was particularly popular, necessitating the construction of additional courtyards to accommodate increased numbers of pilgrims. The minarets also date from this period. The small room where Nematollah Vali prayed and meditated contains plasterwork and tile decorations. The complex is also famous for its tilework and seven ancient wooden doors.

The blue girih tiled dome contains stars with, from the top, 5, 7, 9, 12, 11, 9 and 10 points in turn. 11-point stars are rare in the geometric patterns of Islamic art.

== Architecture ==
The complex includes some courtyards and other sections which are as follows when one moves from the street toward the interior of the mosque: Atabaki courtyard, Vakil-ol-Molki courtyard, Modir-ol-Molki portico, the shrine, Shah Abbasi portico, Mirdamad courtyard and Hosseiniyeh courtyard.

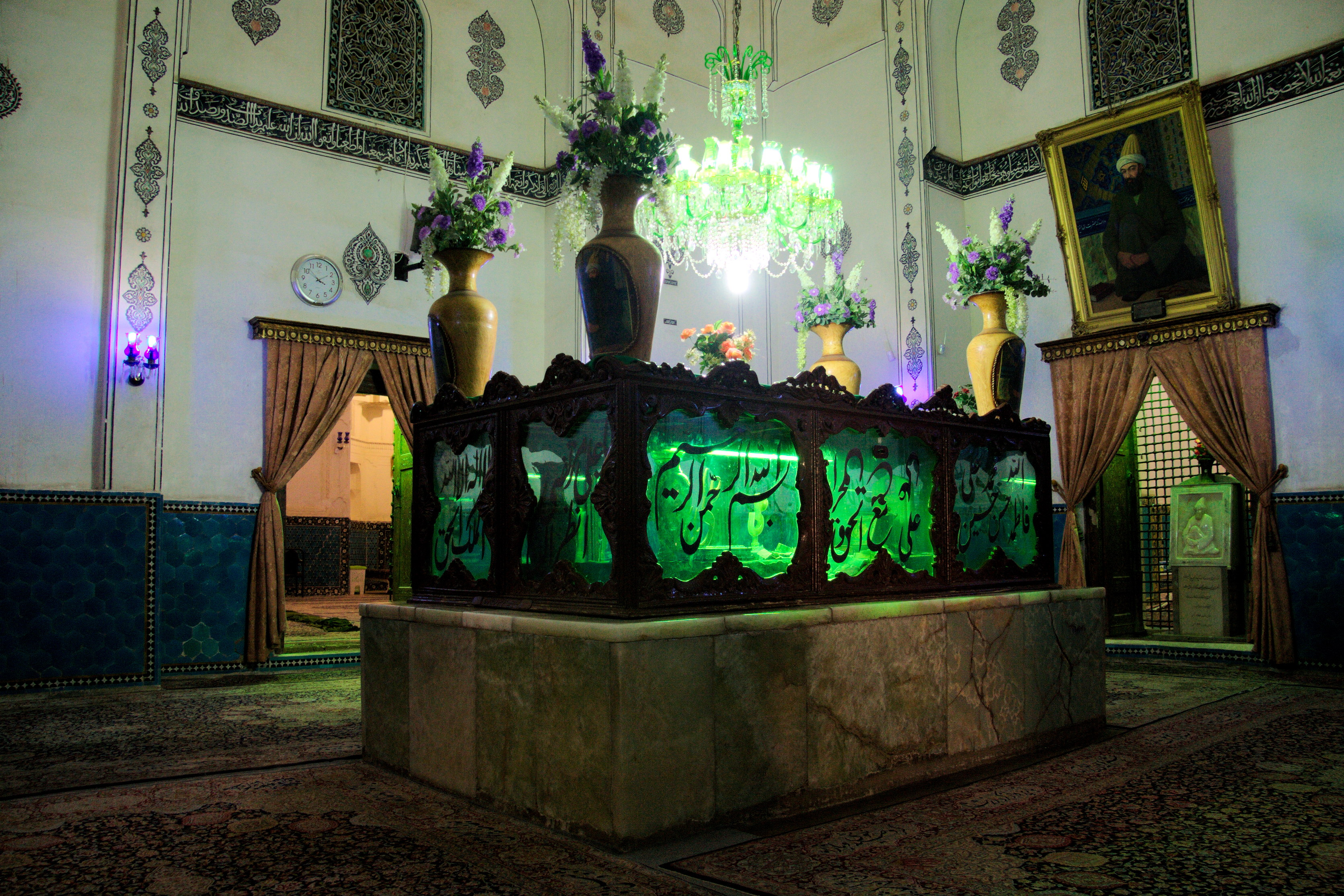
Zarih of Shah Nematollah Vali

The shrine has a dome-shaped arch which is adorned with paintings and has two shells. On the southwestern side of the portico behind the shrine, there is a small place where Shah Nematollah Vali spent 40 days and nights worshipping God. Chelleh Khaneh, or Forty Nights' House, was totally damaged during a flood in 1932, but was reconstructed later.

The Shah Abbasi Portico was built in 998 AH (1589/1590 CE), under the rule of Shah Abbas I and when Beik Tash Khan was the ruler of Kerman.

=== Sahns ===
The Atabaki courtyard was built through contributions from Ali Asghar Khan Atabak, the chancellor of Naser al-Din Shah Qajar. The Vakil-ol-Molki courtyard was built by Mohammad Esmaeil Ebrahim Khan Nouri, Vakil-ol-Molk. The Mirdamad Courtyard, which is also known as Shah Abbasi courtyard, was reconstructed under the rule of Naser al-Din Shah. The Hosseiniyeh Courtyard is the last courtyard of Shah Nematollah Vali complex which contains the Mohammad Shahi minarets standing on the western side of it.

== Gallery ==
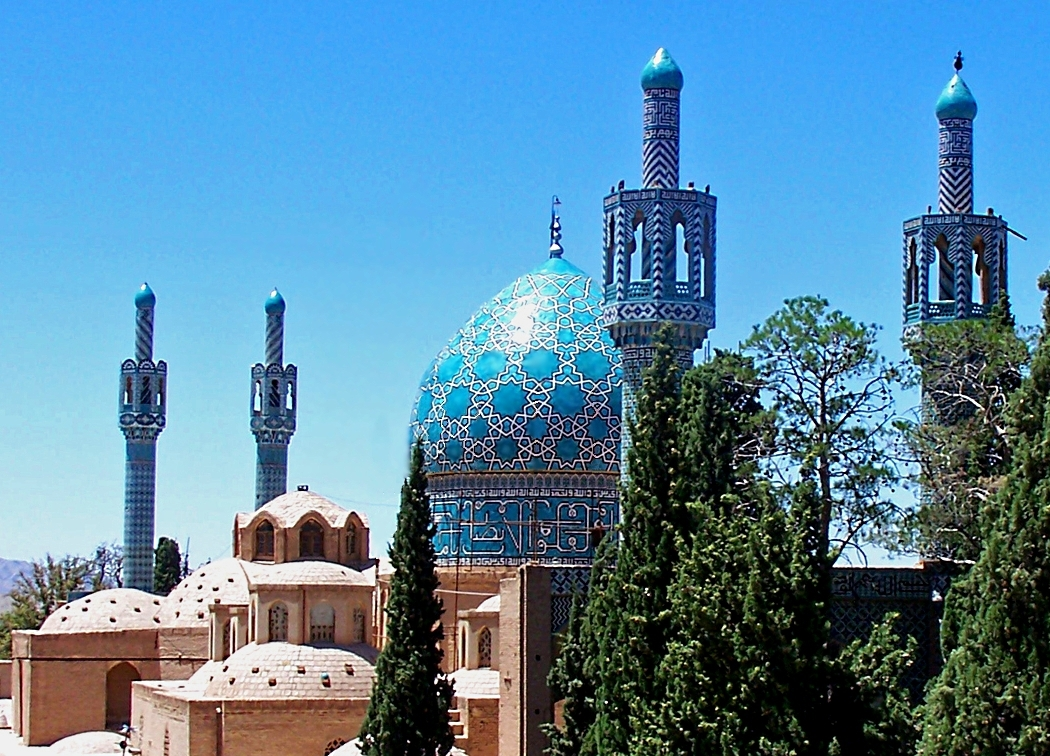
View of the dome and the minarets

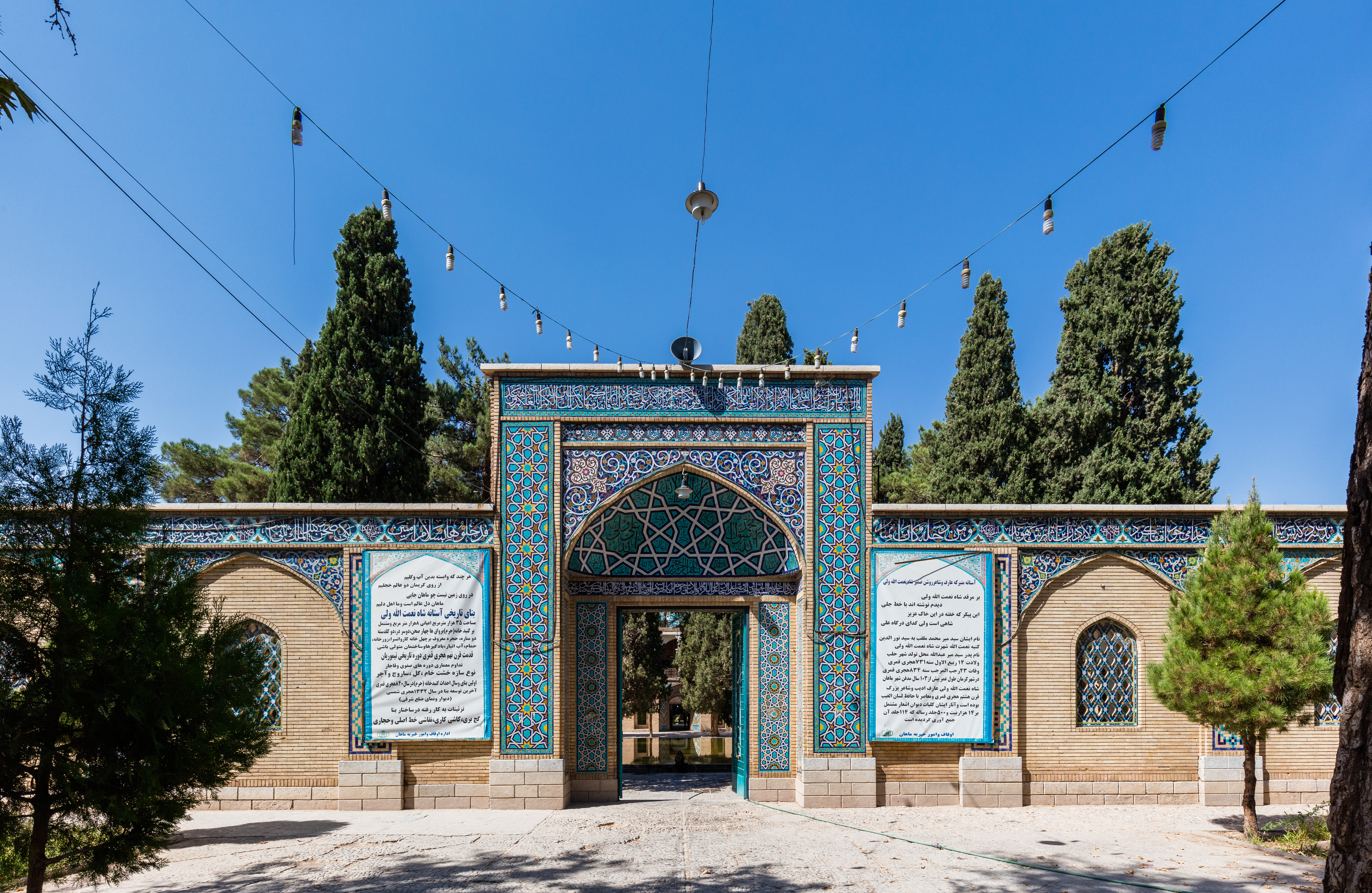
Entrance door to the shrine.

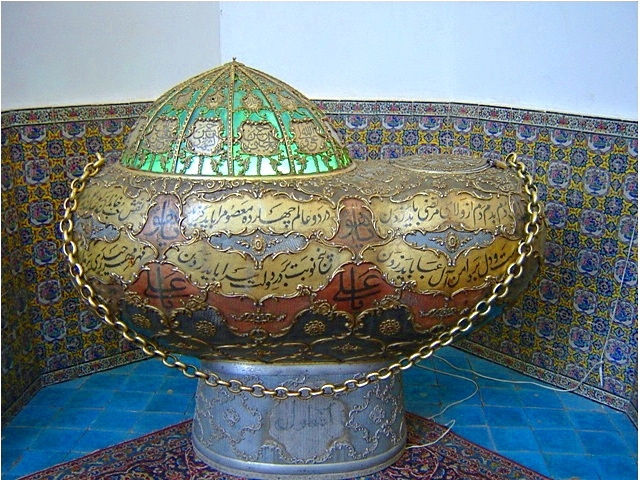
An item in the museum.

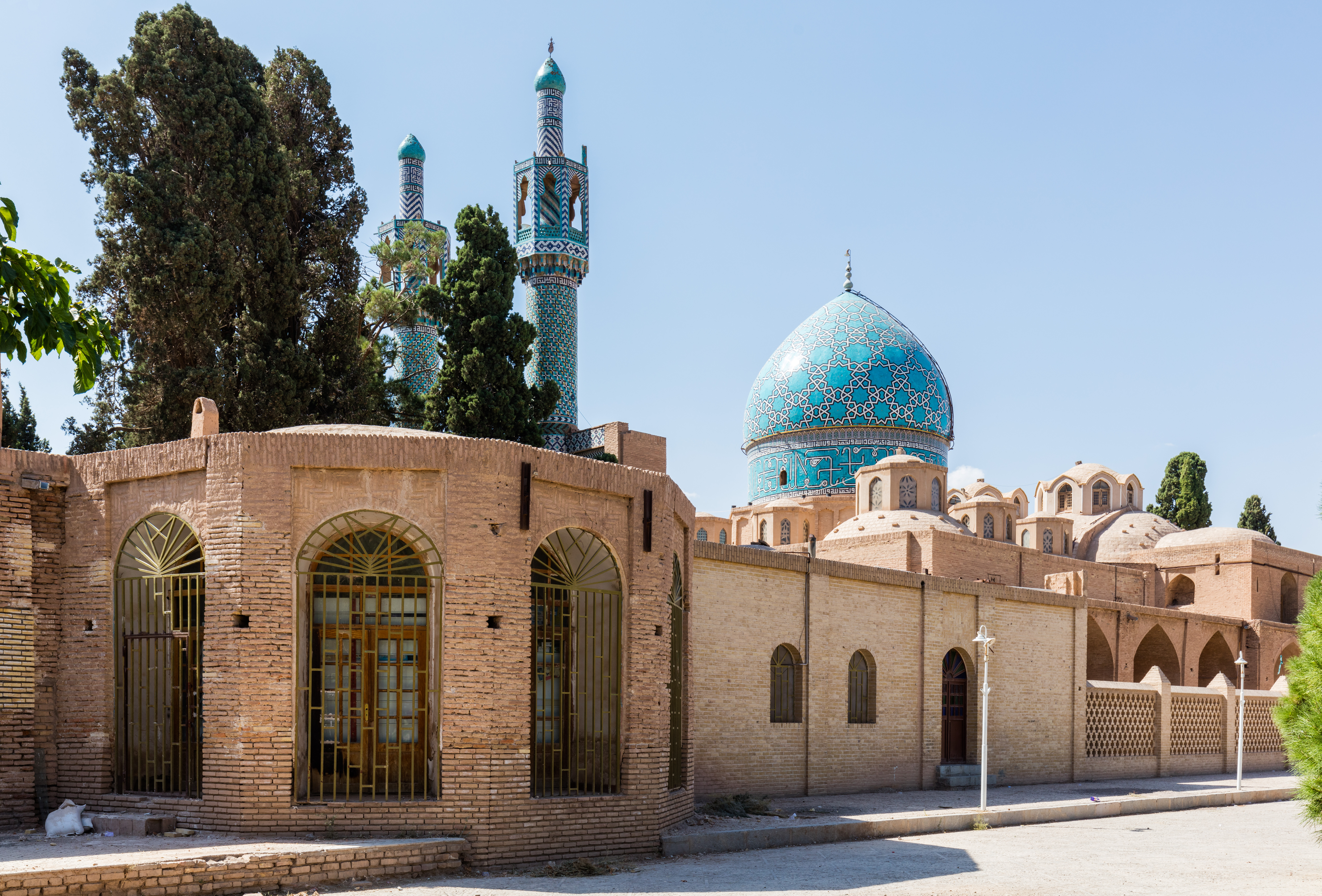
Outside view of the shrine

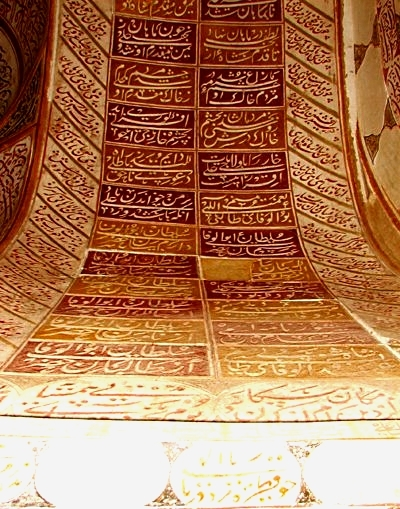
Interior Decorations (Calligraphy)

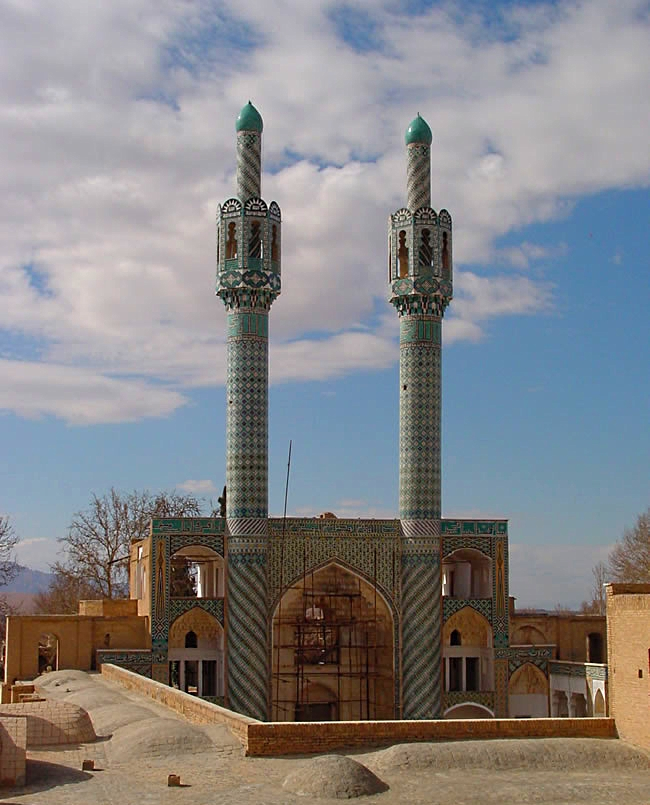
View of the twin minarets

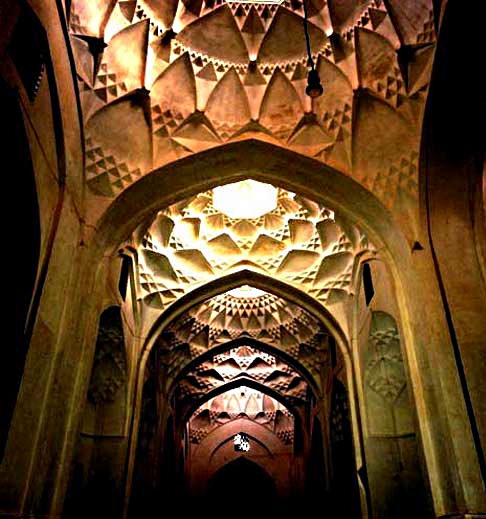
Interior ceiling vaults

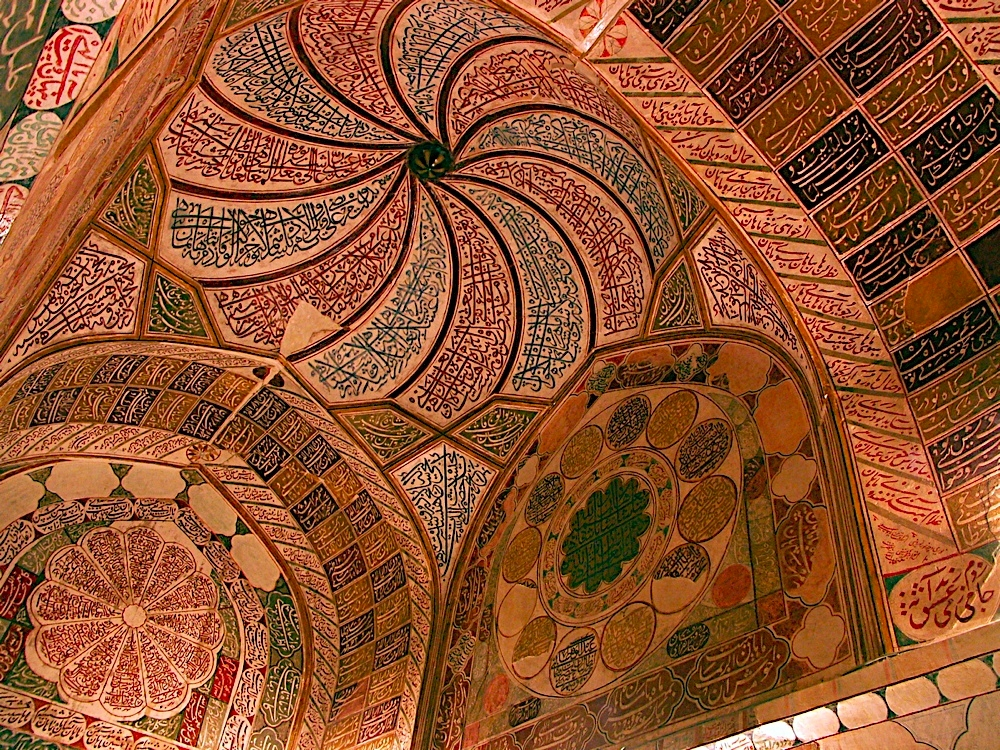
Elaborate decorations of the meditation room

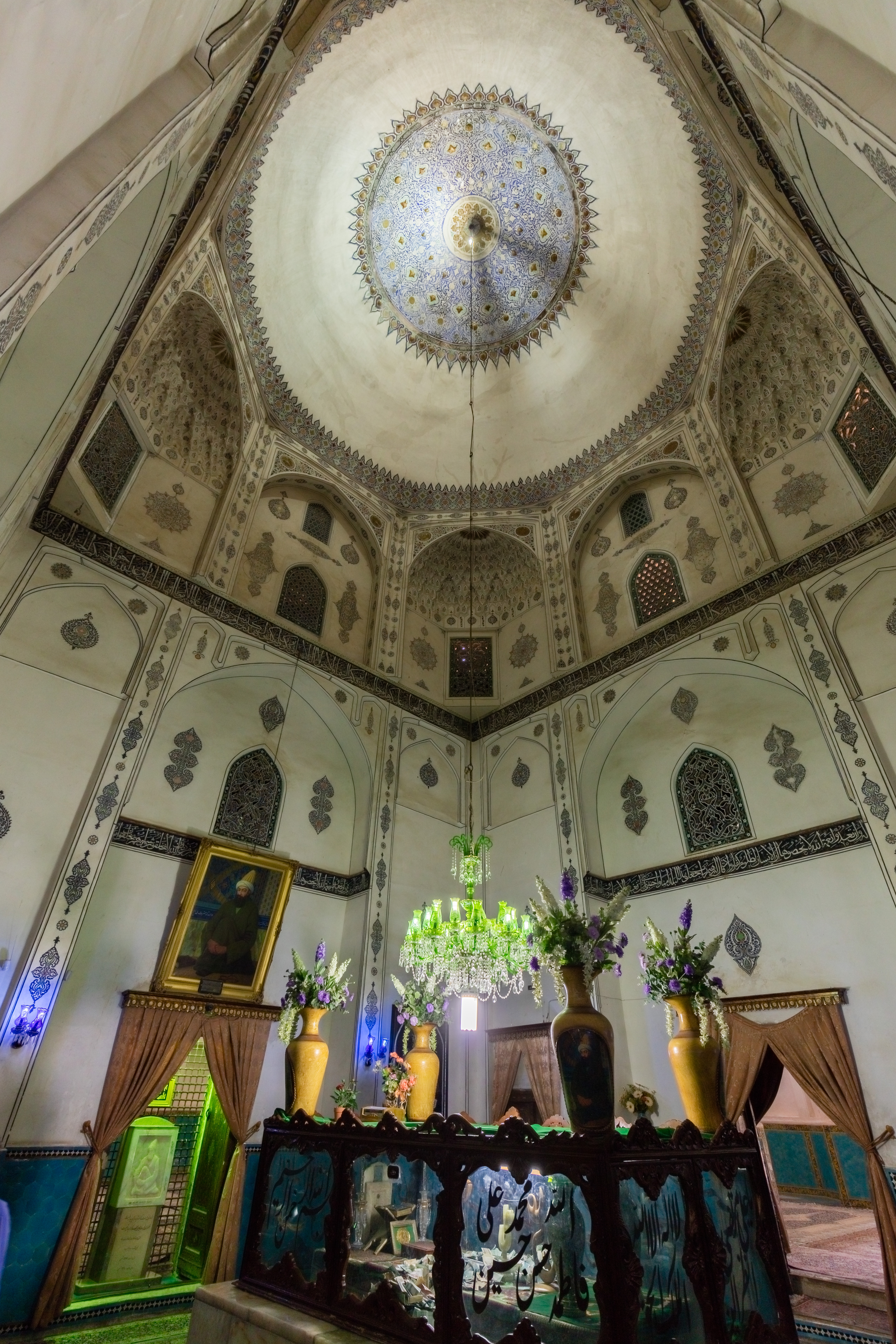
Tomb room

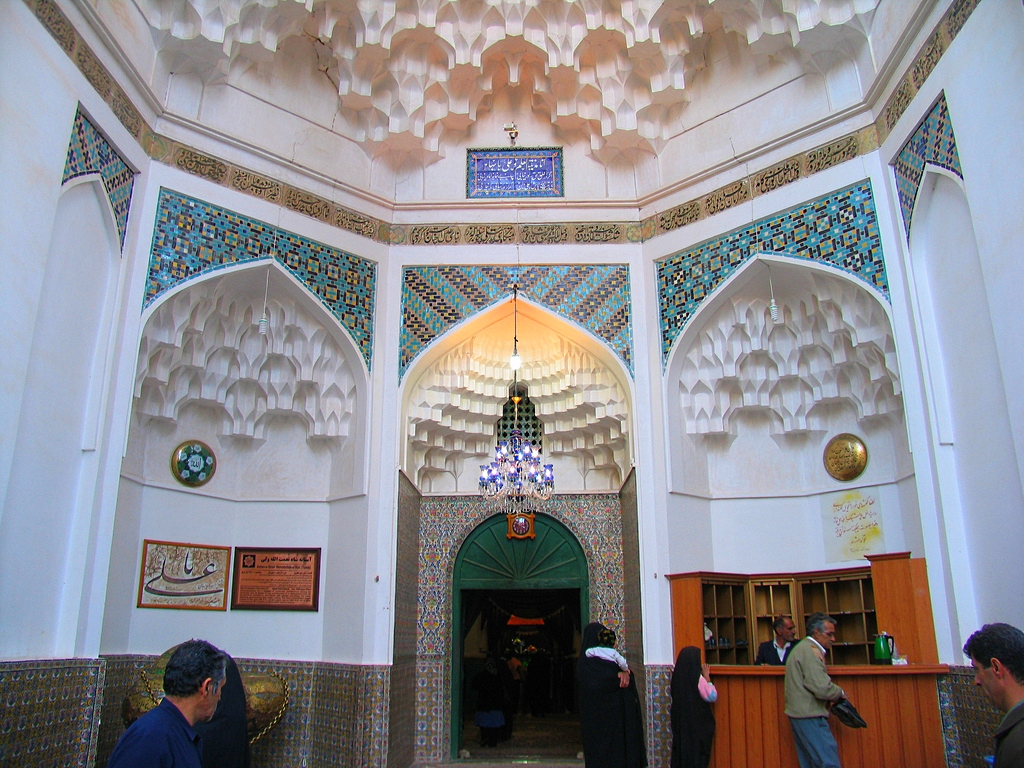
Interior Iwans

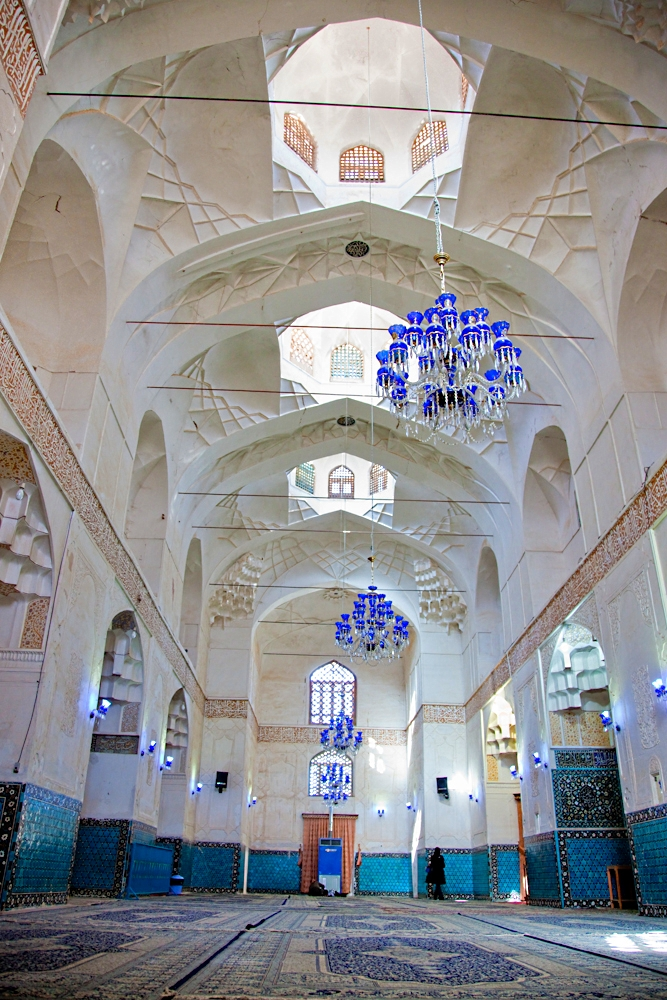
The praying hall

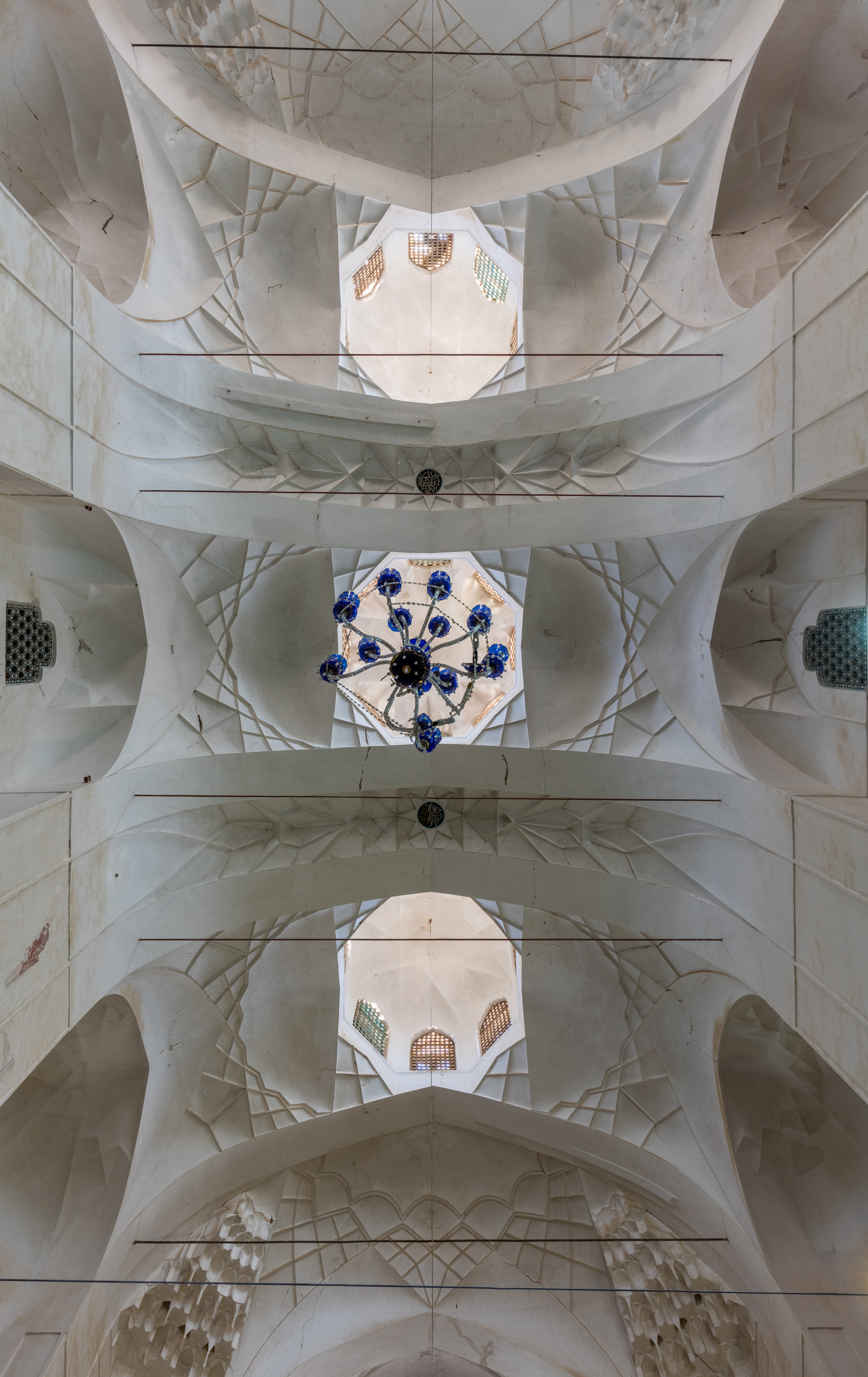
Ceiling of the praying hall

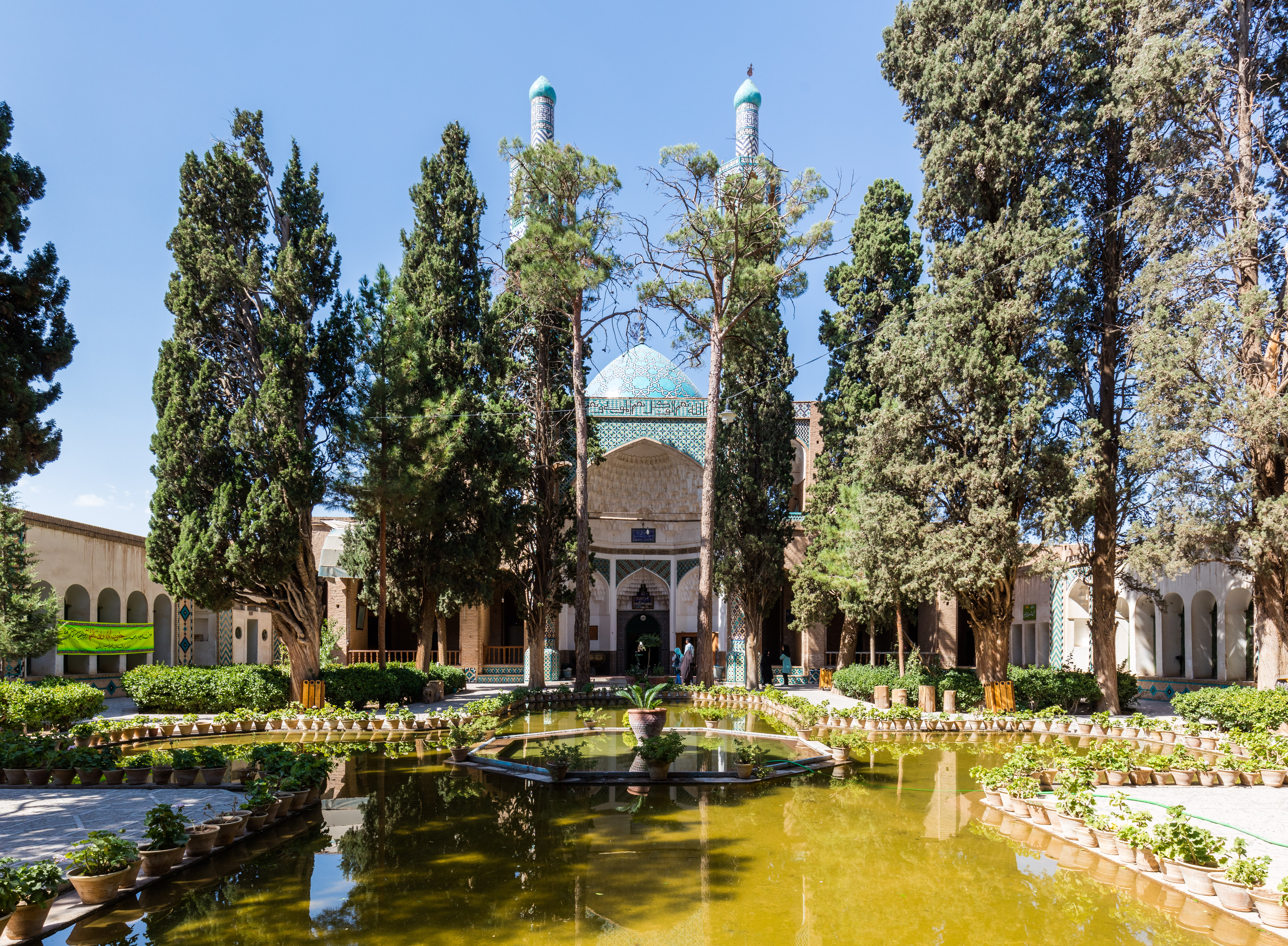
Garden and minarets

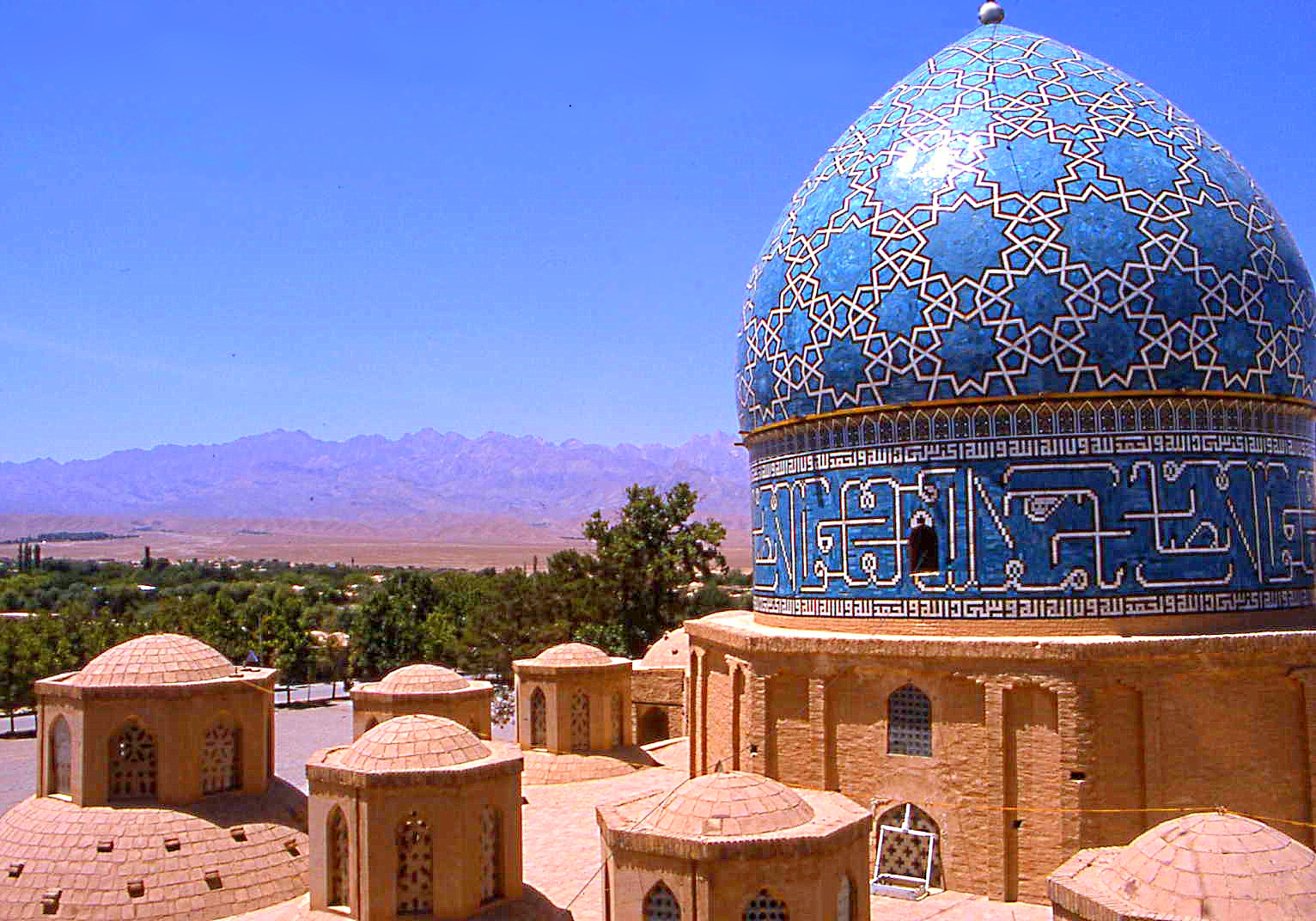
View of the blue dome

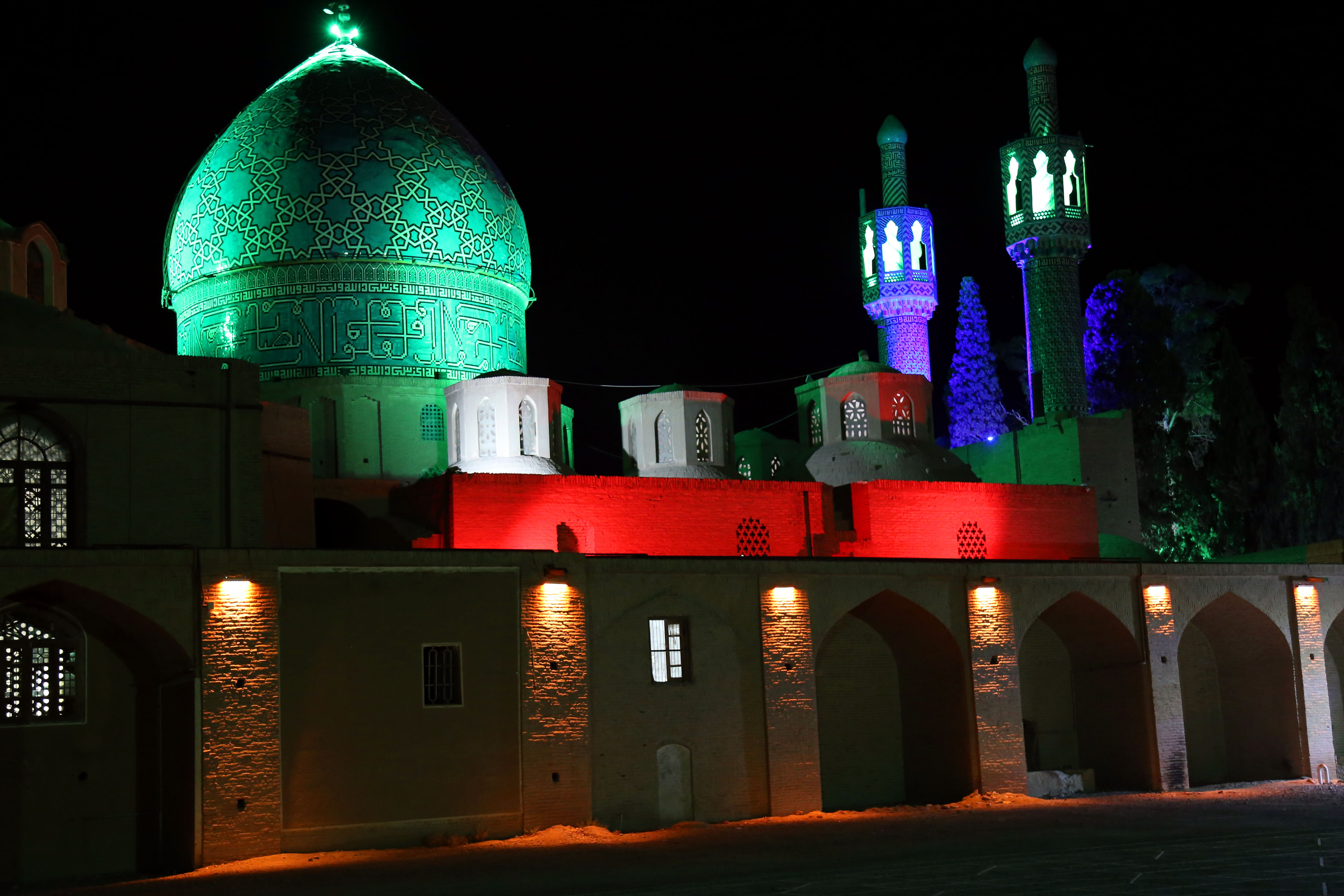
Shah Nematollah Vali Shrine, Kerman, Iran

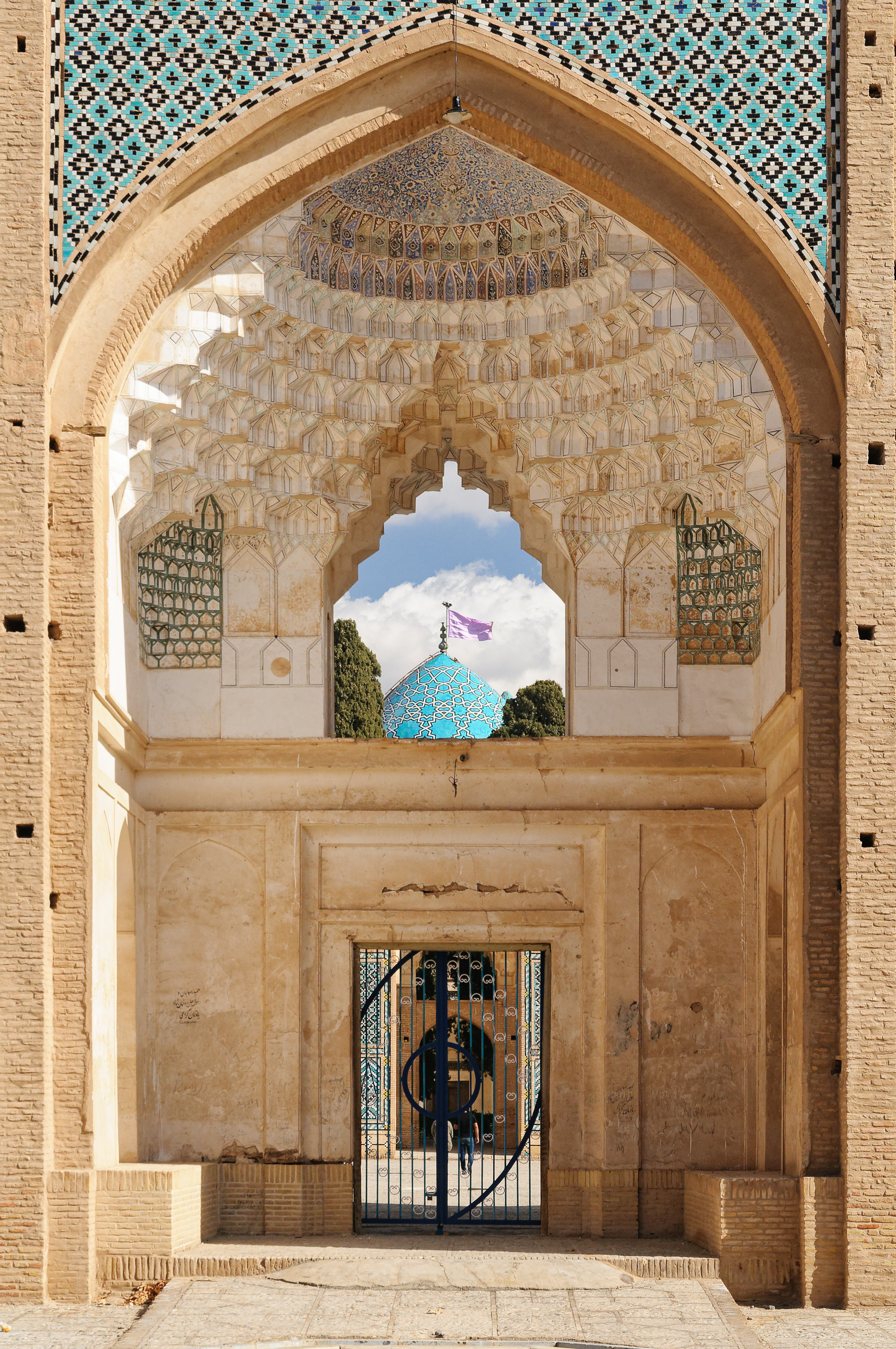
Gate to the shrine

== See also ==
- Iranian architecture
- List of mausoleums in Iran
- Shah Nematollah Vali
- Sufism

== Bibliography ==
- Broug, Eric (2008). Islamic Geometric Patterns. Thames and Hudson. ISBN 978-0-500-28721-7.
