= Alireza Nurbakhsh =

Master of the Nimatullahi Sufi Order (born 1955)

Alireza Nurbakhsh; (Reza 'Ali Shāh)
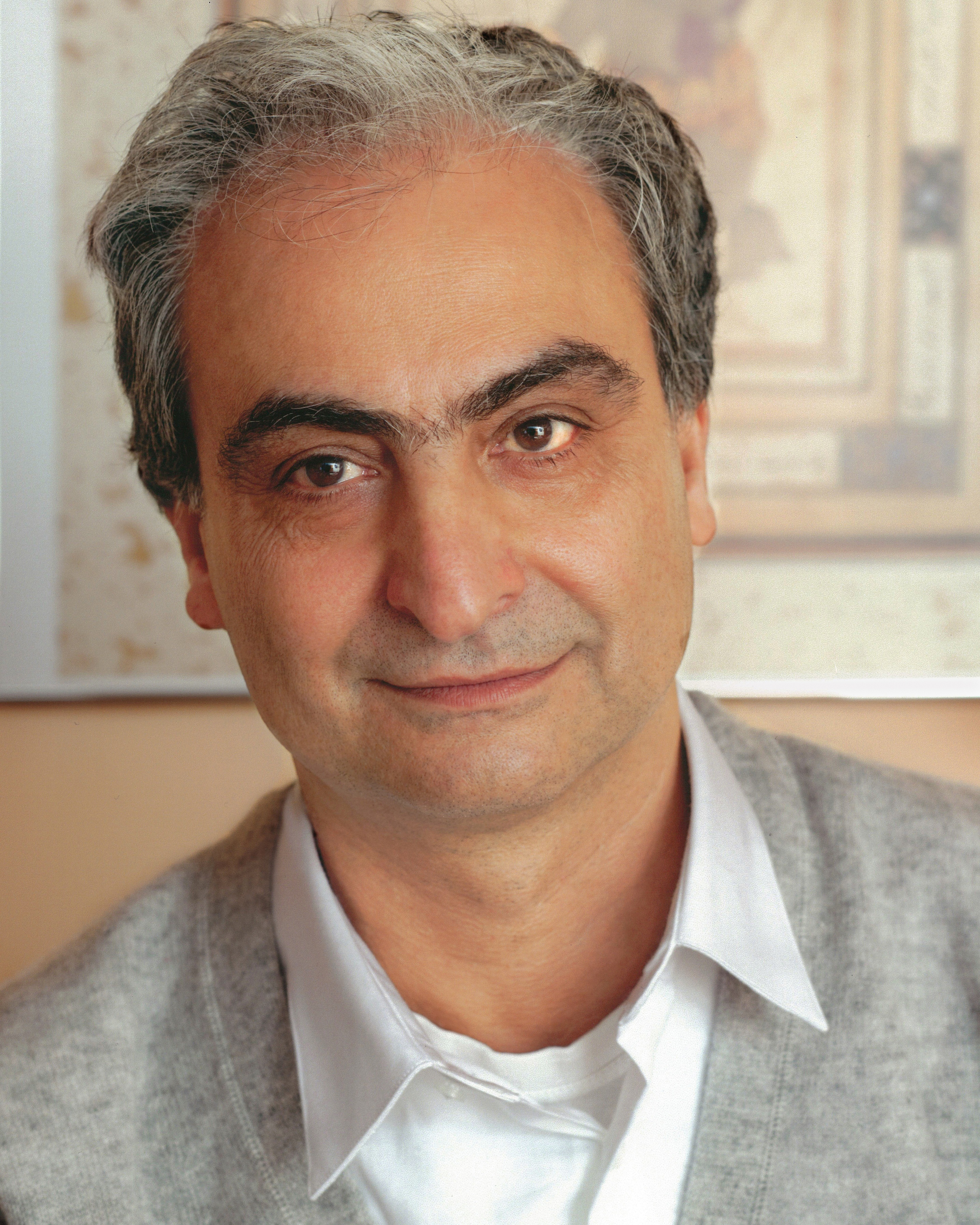
- Born: 12 August 1955; Bam, Iran
- Education: University of Wisconsin-Madison (PhD in Philosophy) The University of Law (Postgraduate Diploma in Law)
- Occupations: Sufi Master; Lawyer; Poet
- Website: nimatullahi.org

Alireza Nurbakhsh (Persian: علیرضا نوربخش; born 12 August 1955) is the present Master (pir) of the Nimatullahi Sufi Order. He assumed this position after the death of his father, Javad Nurbakhsh on October 10, 2008.

Under his leadership, the Nimatullahi Sufi Order expanded its charitable initiatives by establishing programs in each center through the Sufi Service Committee to support the social and economic needs of local communities.

== Life ==
Nurbakhsh was born in a small town near Bam, in Kerman province in Iran. His family moved to Tehran when he was two years old. He lived in the Nimatullahi Khanqah (Sufi Center) in Tehran until he left Iran for United States in 1977, to pursue a PhD in philosophy. After receiving his degree, Nurbakhsh moved to London where he studied and practiced law. Following more than twenty years of legal practice in London, he retired in 2023 to devote his full time, energy, and efforts to writing on Sufism and mysticism, as well as to the expansion of charitable activities around the world.

== Education ==
After graduating from Alborz High School in 1973, Nurbakhsh attended Tehran's Melli University and graduated with a Bachelor of Arts in philosophy. He continued his post graduate studies at University of Wisconsin–Madison and received a PhD in philosophy in 1988. In London he returned to school and received a Postgraduate Diploma in Law (CPE) and completed the Legal Practice Course (LPC) at the University of Law in London.

== Selected articles/lectures ==
In 1988, Alireza Nurbakhsh became the editor-in-chief of Sufi Journal in English and Persian. Among his published works and lectures are writings on diverse aspects of Sufism, mysticism, and spiritual thought and practice:

- The Nimatullahi Order
- Love's Disciple: Some Recollections About Mr. Kobari
- Bayazidian Sufism: Annihilation without Ritual
- The Meaning of Surrender
- The Master-Disciple Relationship Revisited
- The Experience of Nothingness
- Divine Love
- Friendship
- Silence, the Breath Is Precious
- Caring for Others: Sufism and Altruism
- The Illusion of Self
- Spiritual Yearning
- Perspectives on Climate Change
- Detachment
- The Spiritual Guide
- Devotion
- The Limit of Reason and the Practice of Sufism
- Climate Change A Case for Contentment
- Truth Matters
- The Experience of Beauty and the Sublime
- The Nature of the Sacred
- Knowledge of the Self
- Dream Interpretation
- Beyond Us Versus Them
- Lessons from the Pandemic
- Appearance and Reality
- Fairness
- Intimacy with God
- Love in the Midst of Human Suffering
- Sufism, Love and Mindfulness
- Mindfulness without the Mind
- Sufism and the Way of Blame
- Unity of Being
- Changing One's Self through Changing One's Perspective
- The Qualities of a Friend
- Tribalism and Sufism
- Devotion as the Path of Self-Purification
- Inner Peace: The Path to Equanimity

== Poems ==
Alireza Nurbakhsh’s poetry collection (Divan), titled Love in the Ruins (Persian: عشق در ویرانه‌ها), was published in Persian in 2025. An English translation of the collection was published in 2026. Selected poems translated into English are listed below:

- Love in the Ruins (Persian: عشق در ویرانه‌ها) - Composed May 2023 - Banbury, UK
- The Cupbearer (Persian: ساقی) - Composed June 2017 - Banbury, UK
- Idol Breaker (Persian: بت شکن) - Composed December 2016 - Santa Fe, New Mexico, USA
- Love for the Friend (Persian: محبت دوست) - Composed June 2016 - London, UK
