= Shah Nimatullah Wali =

Persian Sufi master and poet

- شاه نعمت‌الله ولی
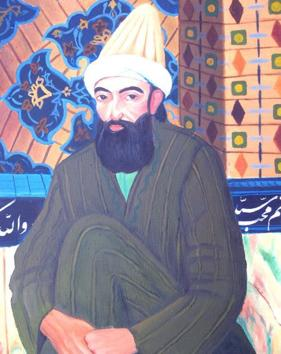
- Portrait of him located at his shrine, dated in the Qajar era

Personal life
- Born: 1330 Aleppo, Mamluk Sultanate (present-day Syria)
- Died: 1431 (aged 100–101) Mahan, Timurid Empire (present-day Iran)
- Resting place: Shah Nematollah Vali Shrine

Religious life
- Religion: Islam
- Denomination: Sunni
- Tariqa: Nimatullahi (founder)

Shāh Ni'matullāh Wali (Persian: شاه نعمت‌الله ولی, romanized: Shāh Ne'matollāh-e Valī; Arabic: نعمة الله ولي), (Note: Also spelled as Ne'matollah and Ni'matallah) was a Persian Sufi master and spiritual leader (Note: or Qutb) of the Ni'matullahi order in Iran from the 14th and 15th centuries. He is revered by Sunni Islam as a saint and by the Ni'matullāhī tariqa, who consider him their founder.

== Biography ==
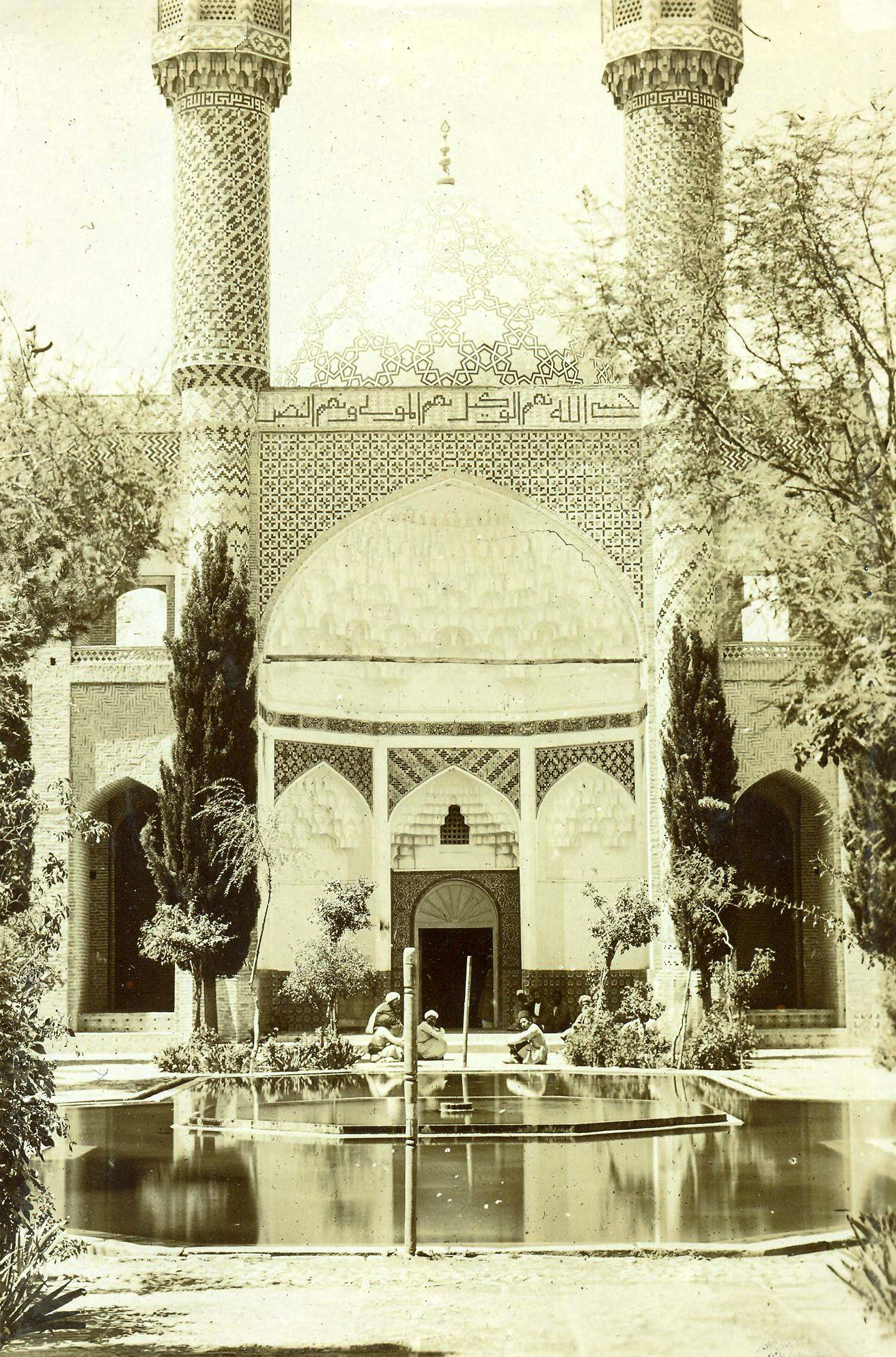
Shah Nematollah Vali Shrine in Qajar era.

Born in Aleppo, Syria (or in Kuhbanan, Iran, according to some historians), Ni'matullah traced his own descent from the sixth Imam Ja'far al-Sadiq in both a poetic work and an epistle reproduced by his biographers 'Abd al-Razzāq Kirmānī and 'Abd al-'Azīz Wā'iẓ. Ni'matullah travelled widely through the Muslim world, learning the philosophies of many masters, but not finding a personal teacher he could dedicate himself to. Ni'matullah studied the writings of the great Sufi philosopher and mystic Ibn ʿArabī.

Ni'matullah met Abdollah Yafe'i of the Suhrawardiyya in Mecca and subsequently became his disciple. He studied intensely with his teacher for seven years. Spiritually transformed, he was sent out for a second round of travels, this time as a realized teacher.

Ni'matullah temporarily resided near Samarkand, along the great Central Asian Silk Road. It was here that he met the conqueror Tamerlane, but in order to avoid conflict, Ni'matullah soon left and eventually settled in the Baloch region of Kerman. His shrine is in nearby Mahan.

By the time Ni'matullah died, his fame had spread throughout Persia and India (though his presence is not much noted in India), and it is said he initiated hundreds of thousands of followers in the path now known by his name.

Ni'matullah's son Shah Khalilullah was the next qutb (master) of the Nimatullahi order. On the invitation of Sultan Ahmed Shah Al Wali Bahamani of Bidar Sultanate Deccan to Shah Nimatullah Wali, he replied, "I am 104 years old, I cannot come; I am sending my son Shah Khalilullah" to the Deccan (around 1430 CE).

The silsilah (spiritual lineage) of the Ni'matullahi then moved to Ashtoor outside Bidar in the Deccan. Before Shah Khalilullah, his son Shah Nurullah came to Bidar and was later married to the Sultan's daughter. The place where the Sultan received Shah is now Khalilabad outside Bidar. The Sultan had seen Shah in his dream and wished that the saint come to Bidar. This dream, according to many history books, was realized: when he received Shah, he told his counsels, "If this is the same person I saw in my dream, he should be carrying an octagon-shaped head cap," and hence he was satisfied when Shah Khalilullah presented him with the cap. Today, even the Tomb of Shah is octagonal.

== Works ==
=== Poetry ===
Shah N'imatullah Wali has a collected diwan in Persian that includes qasidas, ghazals, tarjī‘āt, mathnawis, do-baytīs, rubāʿiyāt, and more.

A well-known ode attributed to Shah N'imatullah Wali, with the rhyme Mey Beenum, has been published in several sources. Among the most notable is the edition by Maulwi Firozuddin (d. 1949), included in his book Qaseeda Zuhoor-e-Mehdi, published in the 20th century, in which he also provided an Urdu translation. In this work, Firozuddin presented what he considered to be the most authentic version of the ode and structured the book around its text.

=== Other Writings ===
- Sharḥ-e Lama‘āt: consisting of a preface and commentaries on Lama‘āt by Fakhr al-Din Ibrahim Iraqi.
- Treatises of Shah Nimatullah Wali: a collection of 97 treatises.

== Shrine ==
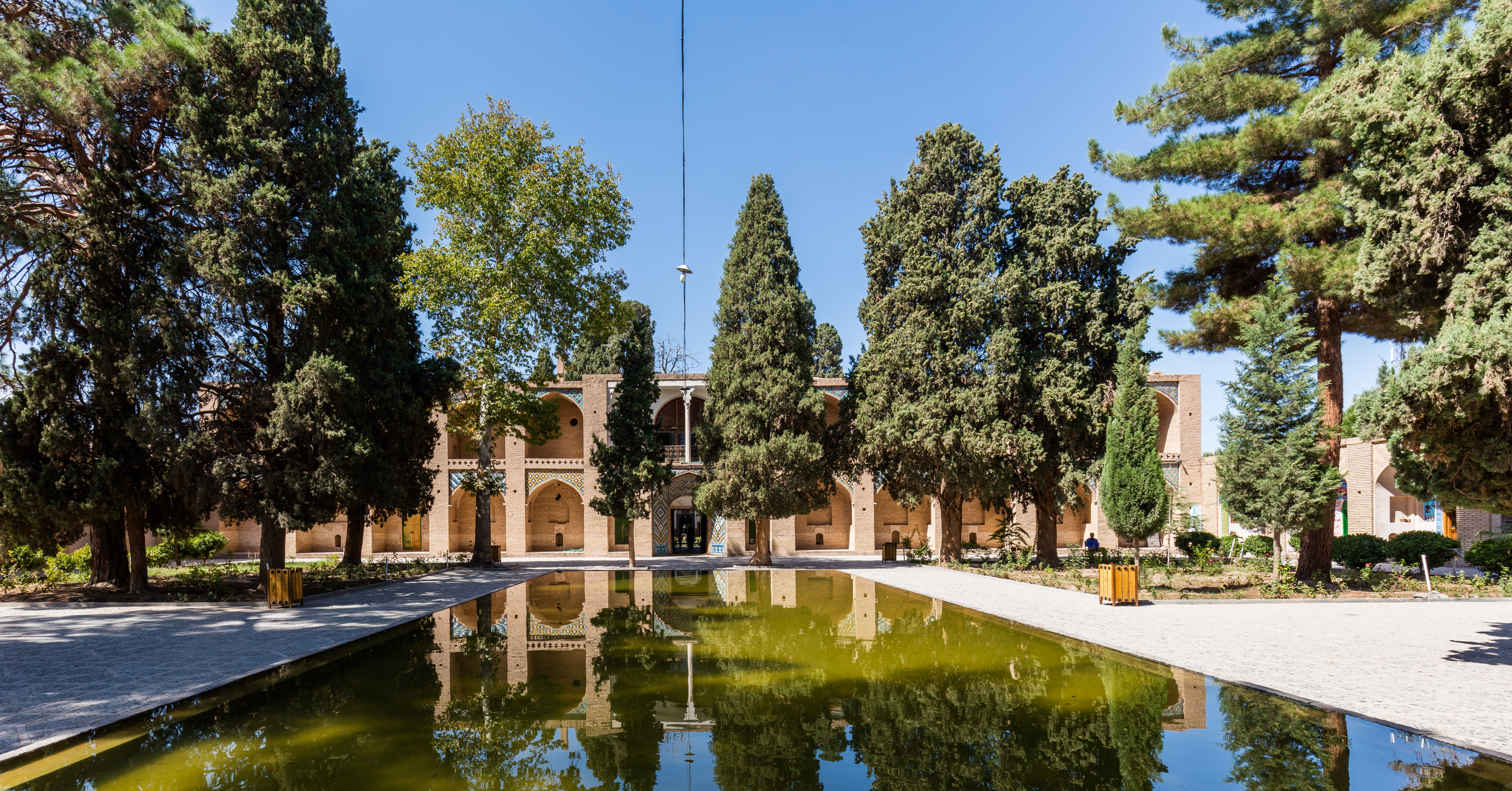
Shah Nematollah Vali Shrine in Mahan, Iran.

The shrine of Shah Ni'matullah Wali is a historical complex located in Mahan, Kerman Province, Iran, which contains his mausoleum. In 1436, a shrine was erected in his honor and became a pilgrimage site, with the attention of successive rulers contributing various additions over the centuries. The shrine complex comprises four courtyards, a reflecting pool, a mosque and twin minarets covered with turquoise tiles from the bottom up to the cupola.

== Tomb ==
Shah Khalilullah's tomb is located outside Bidar fort and is known as "chokundi." Today it is under the authority of the Archaeological Survey of India. Shah Khalilullah was succeeded by numerous other qutbs (masters), including Shah Mir Mahmud Deccani, Shams al-Din Deccani, and Reza Ali Shah Deccani. The silsilah moved back to Iran after the Sufi master Reza Ali Shah Deccani ordered his disciple Ali Shah Deccani, in the year 1194 AH, near the end of Karim Khan Zand's dynasty, the Zand dynasty, to depart for Iran with his family; he entered Shiraz. Not long after the establishment of the Safavid state, the Ni'matullahi order publicly declared itself Shia. His tomb is located in Kerman, Iran. Natural plant colors decorate the walls of his private chamber, the place where he would stay and fast for 40 days and nights. It is also the place from which he would get inspiration to write his predictions.
