= Mahan, Iran =

City in Kerman province, Iran

Mahan Persian: ماهان
- City
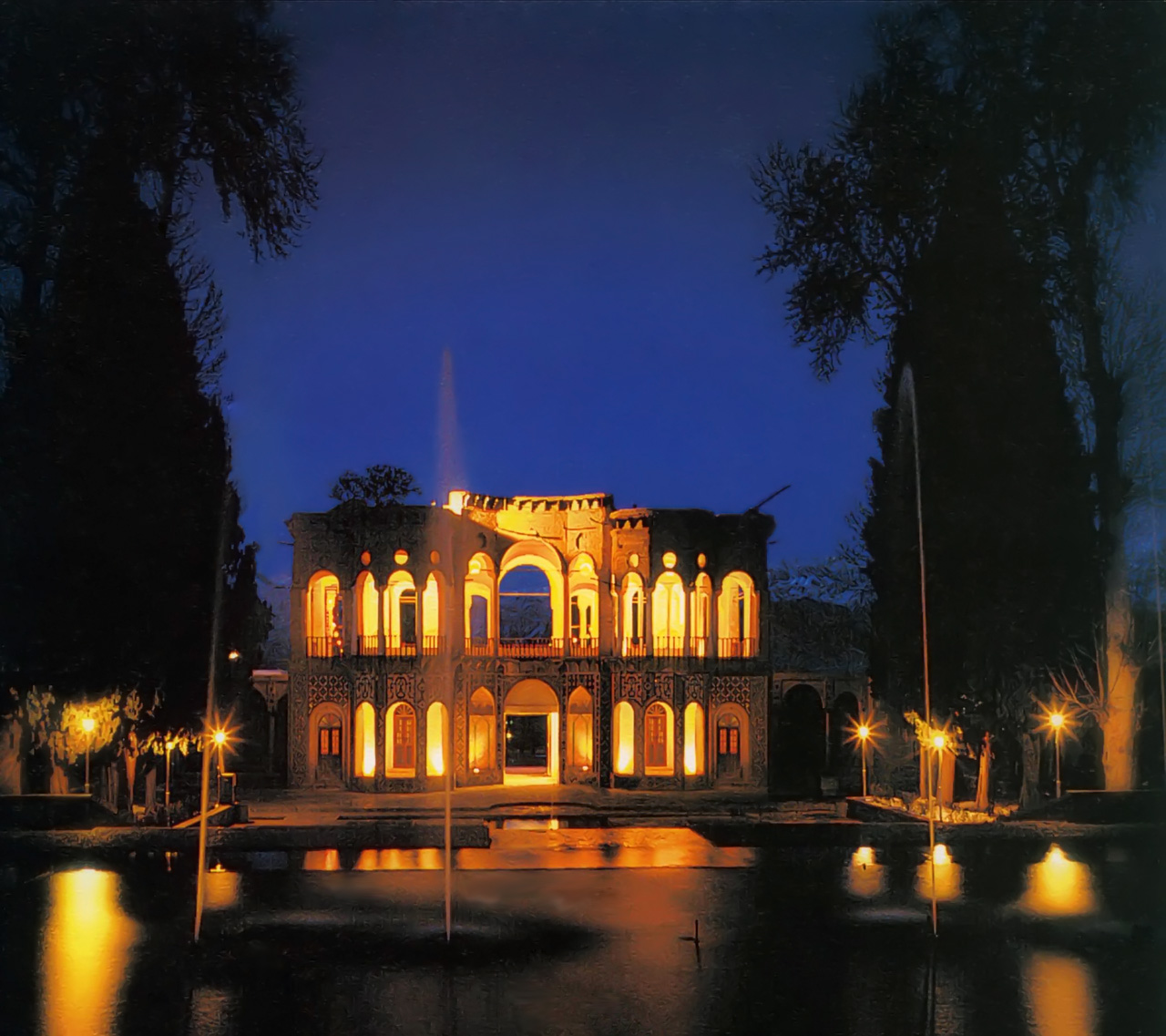
- Shazdeh Garden, Mahan, by night

- Location within Iran
- Coordinates: 30°03′40″N 57°17′29″E
- Country: Iran
- Province: Kerman
- County: Kerman
- District: Mahan

Population (2016)
  - Total: 19,423
- Time zone: UTC+3:30 (IRST)

Mahan (Persian: ماهان) (Note: Also romanized as Māhān and Mâhân; also known as Māhūn) is a city in, and the capital of, Mahan District of Kerman County, Kerman province, Iran.

== History ==
Mahan is well known for the tomb of the great Sufi leader Shah Nimatullah Wali, as well as Shazdeh Garden (Prince Garden).

The tomb of Shah Nur-eddin Nematollah Vali, poet, sage, Sufi and founder of an order of darvishes, has twin minarets covered with turquoise tiles from the bottom up to the cupola. The mausoleum was built by Ahmad Shah Kani; the rest of the building was constructed during the reigns of Abbas the Great, Mohammad Shah Qajar and Naser al-Din Shah Qajar. Shah Nematallah Wali spent many years wandering through central Asia perfecting his spiritual gifts before finally settling at Mahan, 30 km south-east of Kerman, where he passed the last twenty five years of his life. He died in 1431, having founded a Darvish order which continues to be an active spiritual force today. The central domed burial vault at Mahan, completed in 1437 was erected by Ahmad Shah Bahmani, king of the Bahmani Kingdom, and one of Shah Nematallah's most devoted disciples.

== Demographics ==
=== Population ===
At the time of the 2006 National Census, the city's population was 16,787 in 4,138 households. The following census in 2011 counted 17,178 people in 4,707 households. The 2016 census measured the population of the city as 19,423 people in 5,713 households.

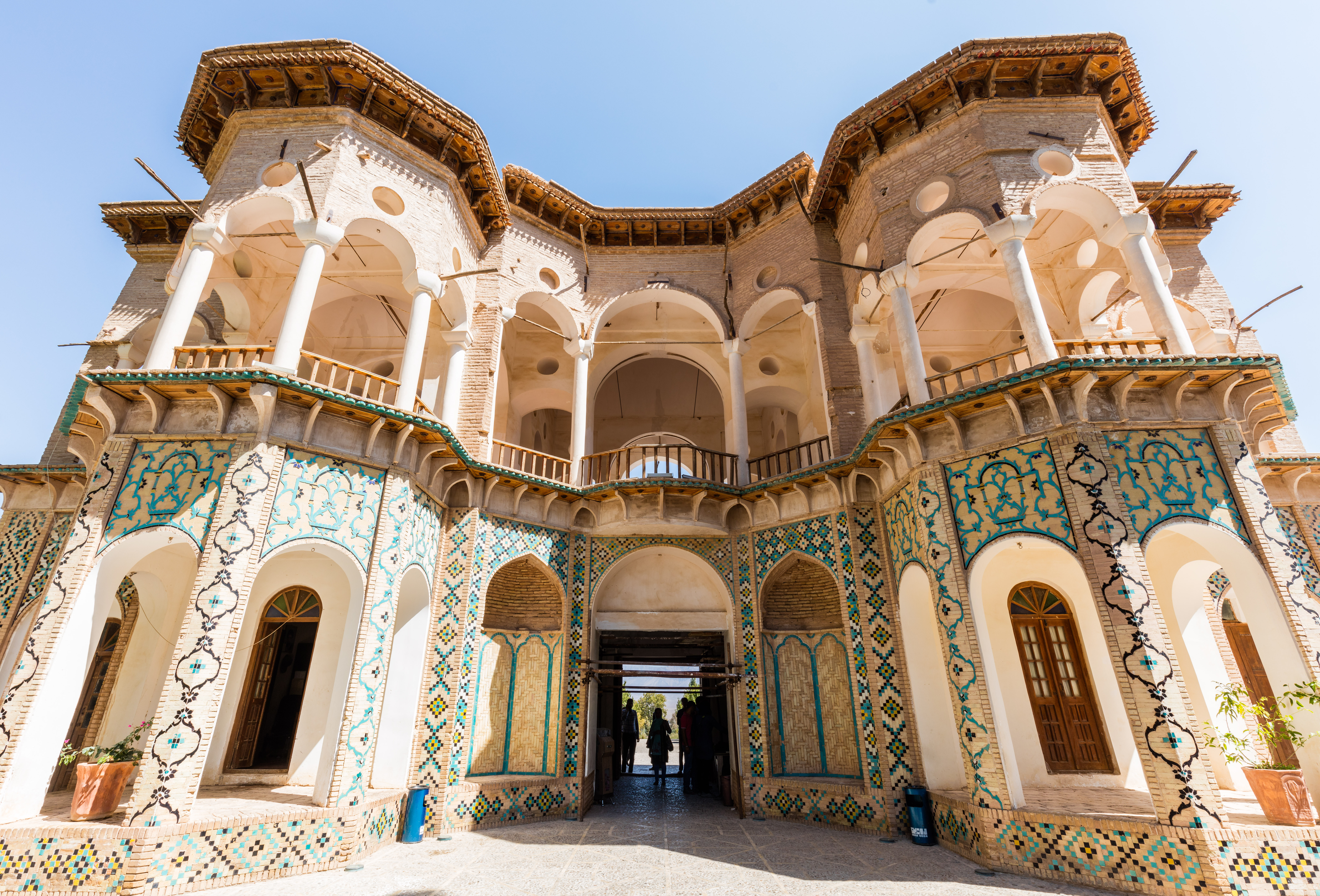
Shazdeh Garden, Mahan. (by day).

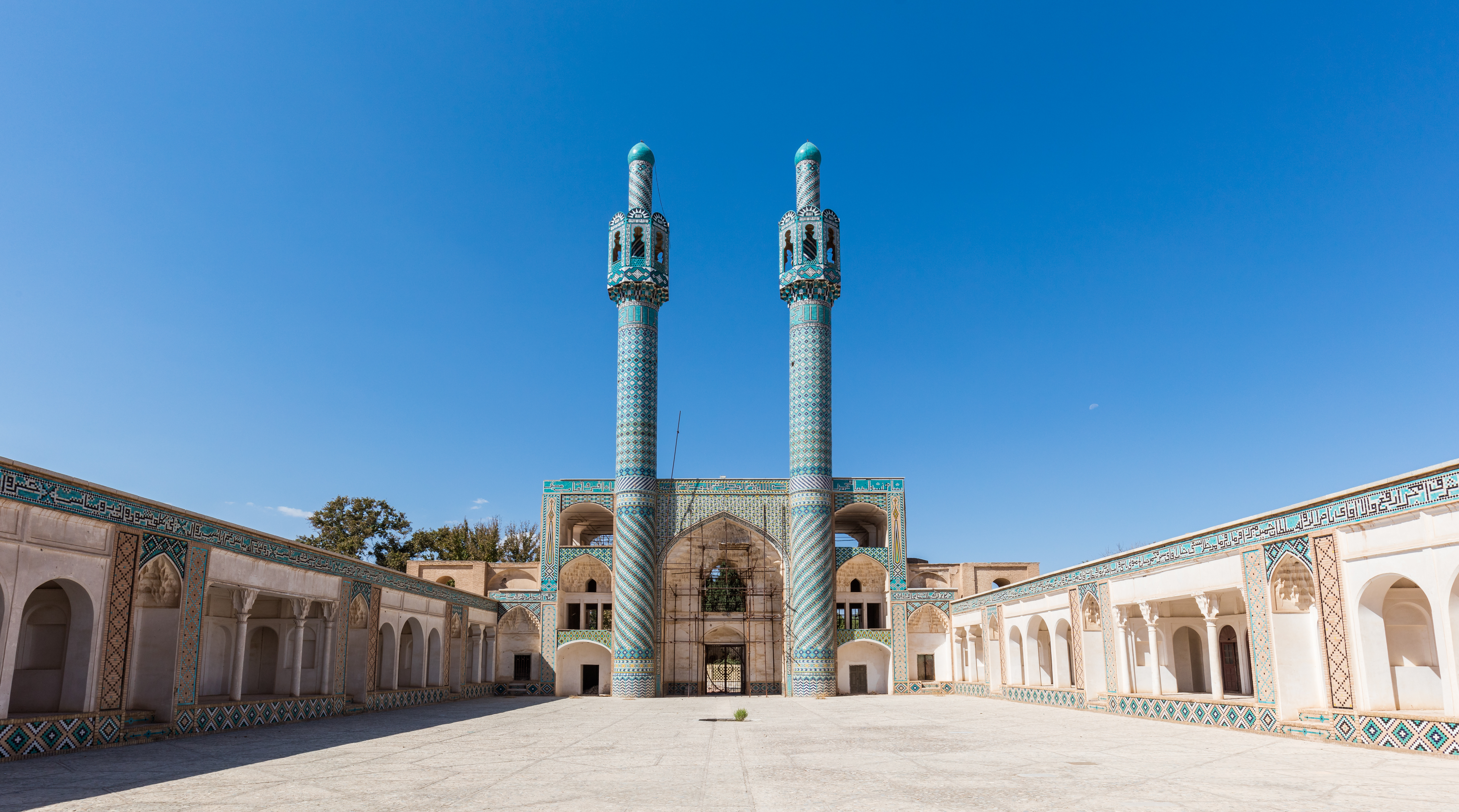
Shah Nematollah Vali Sanctuary.
