= Ni'matullāhī =

Iranian Sufi mystic order in Shia Islam

Nimatullahi Sufi Order
- سلسله نعمت‌اللهی
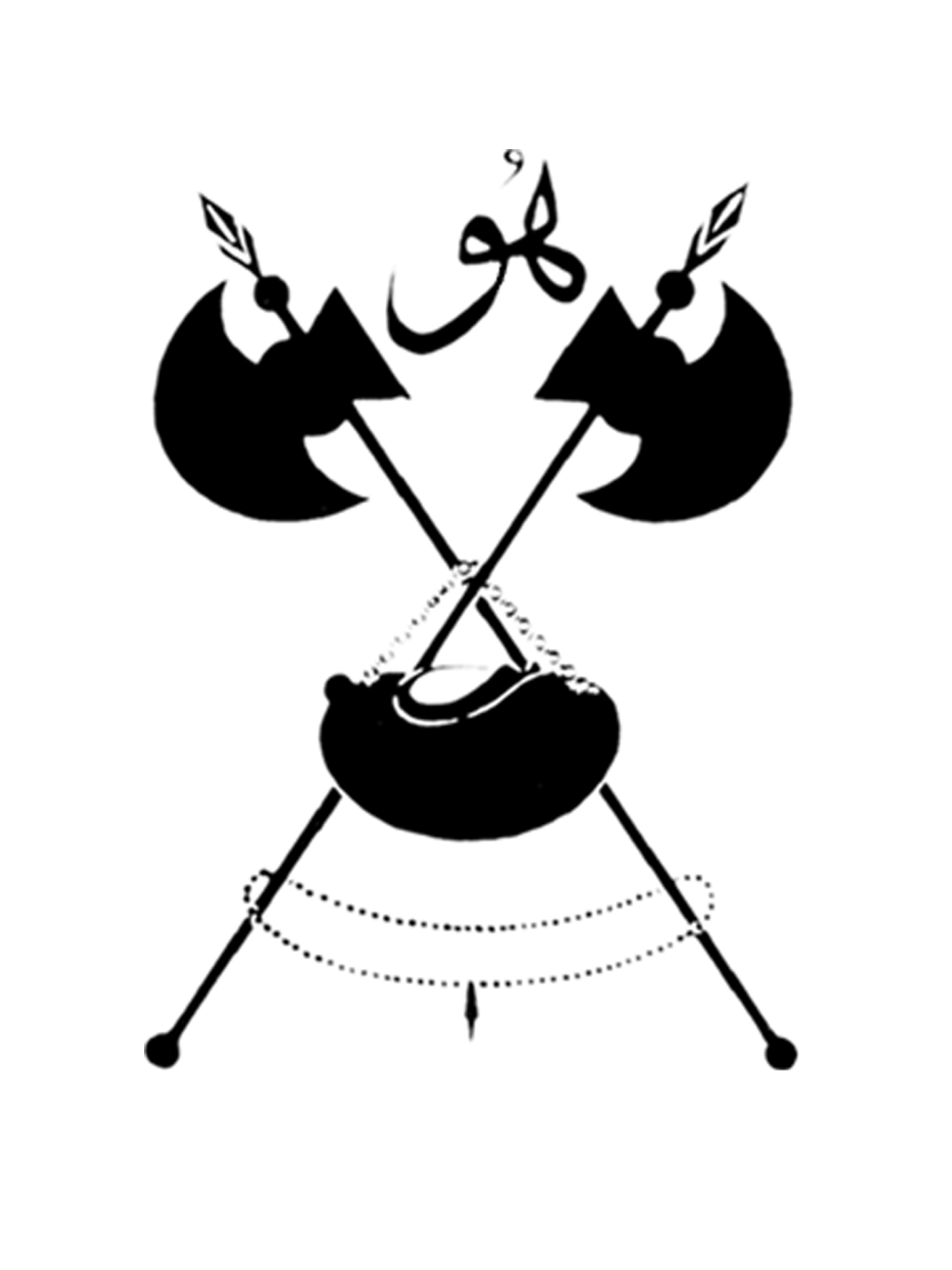
- Type: Sufi order
- Classification: Shia Islam
- Territory: Iran
- Founder: Shah Nimatullah Wali
- Origin: 14th century Timurid Empire

The Ni'matullāhī or Ne'matollāhī (Persian: نعمت‌اللهی) (also spelled as "Nimatollahi", "Nematollahi" or "Ni'matallahi" is a Sufi order (or tariqa) originating in Iran. The order is named after its 14th-century CE Sunni founder and qutb, Shah Nimatullah (Nūr ad-Din Ni'matullāh Wali), who settled in and is buried in Mahan, Kerman Province, Iran, where his tomb is still an important pilgrimage site. Shah Ni'matallāh was a disciple of the Suhrawardiyya Sufi ʿAbd-Allah Yefâ'î, tracing a chain of succession (silsilah) of Sufi qutbs and pīrs — claimed to extend from Ma'ruf al-Karkhi.

From its foundation by Shah Nimatullah, the Sufi order has rejected seclusion and quietism, establishing a principle of meaningful participation and service to society. The Nimatullahi are still active, and are self-described as "an authentic Sufi order that has been in continuous existence for over 700 years. Its centers around the world support practitioners in the mystical way." According to Moojan Momen, the number of Nimatullahi in Iran in 1980 was estimated to be between 50,000 and 350,000. Following the emigration of Javad Nurbakhsh and other dervishes after the 1979 Iranian Revolution, the tariqa attracted numerous followers outside Iran, mostly in Europe, West Africa, and North America, although the first khānaqāh outside Iran was formed in San Francisco, California, United States, in 1975, a few years before the revolution in Iran.

== History ==
The order is named after its 14th century CE Sunni founder Shah Nimatullah (Nūr ad-Din Ni'matullāh Wali), who settled in and is buried in Mahan, Kerman Province, Iran, where his tomb is still an important pilgrimage site. Shah Ni'matallāhī was a disciple of the Qadiri Sufi ʿAbd-Allah Yefâ'î: a chain of succession of masters (silsilah) has been claimed that extends back to Maruf Karkhi.

== Contemporary Nimatullahi Order ==
Dr. Javad Nurbakhsh became pīr of the Niʿmatullāhī Order in 1953 upon the death of his predecessor, Mūnis ʿAli Shah, known as Dhū'l-Rīyāsatayn. Dr. Nurbakhsh was bestowed with the name Nūr 'Ali Shāh Kermani for his initiation when he was 16 years old, and acknowledged as a spiritual prodigy from an early age. Mūnis ʿAli Shah soon assigned the young Javad Nurbakhsh all of the principal duties for operating and maintaining the Nimatullahi khānaqāh in Tehran, before the age of twenty — a time when he was also pursuing full-time medical studies in university. His later accession as qutb initiated a period of expansion, vitality and renewal for the order that bore comparison to the revival by his 18th century predecessor and spiritual namesake, Nūr 'Ali Shāh.

Within Iran, the Nimatullahi order was significantly expanded by Javad Nurbakhsh, having 60 new khānaqāhs built in cities throughout the country between his accession in 1953 and 1979. During this period of growth in the 1970s, visitors to Iran from the United States and Europe were first accepted the order. In 1974, on invitation by American initiates of the Nimatullahi order, Javad Nurbakhsh went to the United States and determined a need to establish regular khānaqāhs there. In 1979, Javad Nurbakhsh's leadership of the Nimatullahi order moved abroad from Tehran, as a result of the revolution in Iran. Dr. Nurbakhsh led the Nimatullahi order from United States until his permanent emigration to England in 1983. By the early 1990s there were nine Nimatullahi khānaqāhs in the United States. The composition of individual Nimatullahi members in their assemblies changed and broadened over these two decades, with American khānaqāhs in the East Coast — such as Boston, New York and Washington — mostly attended by Americans, while those in California were about half American and half of Iranian origins. Nimatullahi members were also accepted from a diversity of religious backgrounds on the basis of sincerity alone, not exclusively restricted to Shi'a Islam.

The growth of a global Nimatullahi presence proceedes, and as of this writing, in 2022, the Nimatullahi order expanded to many parts of the world, with some 36 khānaqāhs located from the United States, Canada, and Mexico, to several European nations, Russia, Western Africa, and Australia.

19th century portrait of Nur Ali Shah

With the death of Dr. Javad Nurbakhsh in October of 2008, succession of leadership as pīr of the Nimatullahi order passed to his son, Dr. Alireza Nurbakhsh as sole spiritual and material heir. Keeping with the order's injunction to be a productive member of society, Alireza Nurbakhsh is a currently practicing lawyer in London. In addition to being licensed as a solicitor, he obtained his PhD in Philosophy from the University of Wisconsin-Madison in 1988. Prior to his accession to leadership of the Nimatullahi, Alireza Nurbakhsh established and guided the first 20 years of the Nimatullahi Sufi journal. The Sufi Journal is responsible for much of the scholarly and artistic sponsorship by the order during those years to present time in 2022. Dr. Alireza Nurbakhsh describes his charge for the continuance and growth of the Nimatullahi practical legacy into a new century - a legacy that he's described as nothing other than the ethos of Divine Unity and Loving Kindness.

== Activities ==
The numerous publications of the order include the bi-annual SUFI Journal. The Khaniqahi Nimatullahi also publish in Persian, English, and other languages. Dr. Javad Nurbakhsh's writings include a seven-volume treatment of the states and stations the Sufi path, his twelve-volume explanation of the meanings of Sufi mystical terminology, and his many annotated biographies of the great historic masters of the path. Social activities of the present-day order include the establishment of clinics and medical centers in impoverished regions of West Africa, where the order has attracted numerous adherents.

== Bibliography ==
- Masters of the Path: A History of the Masters of the Nimatullahi Sufi Order by Dr. Javad Nurbakhsh, Khaniqahi Nimatullahi Publications, New York and London, 2nd Edition, 1993, ISBN 0-933546-03-3 and ISBN 978-0-933546-03-5
- Kings of Love – The History and Poetry of the Nimatullahi Sufi Order by Nasrollah Pourjavady and Peter Lamborn Wilson, Imperial Iranian Academy of Philosophy, Tehran, 1978, ISBN 0-87773-733-9 and ISBN 0-500-97351-2
- Discourses on the Sufi Path by Dr. Javad Nurbakhsh, Trans. Alireza Nurbakhsh, Khaniqahi Nimatullahi Publications, New York and London, 1st Edition, 1996, ISBN 0-933546-58-0
- The Book of Shah Ni'mat'ullah by Trans. Paul Smith, New Humanity Books, 1st Edition, 2014, ISBN 1-503313-19-0
