= Du'a Arafah =

Shia Muslim prayer first recorded by Husayn ibn Ali

Du'a Arafah (Arabic: دعاء عرفة) is a Shia Muslim prayer first recorded by Husayn ibn Ali, the third Imam of Shia. It is read and chanted by Shia Muslims every year on the second day of the Hajj, day of Arafah, in the Arafat desert.

== Authenticity ==
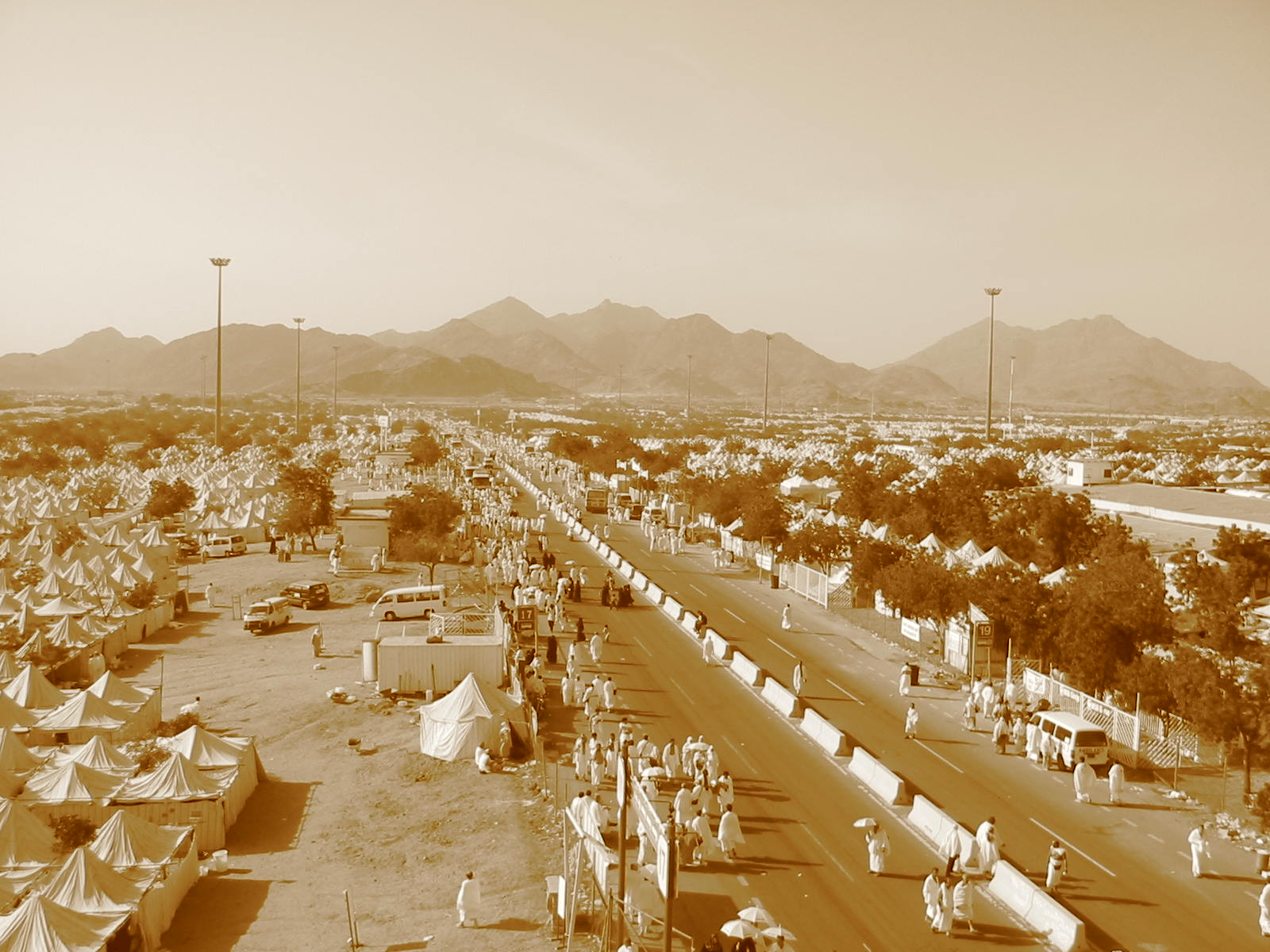
Arafat desert on the Hajj in the Mecca, Saudi Arabia

Glory be to He whose Arsh is in the heavens! Glory be to He whose will operates in the earth. Glory be to He who examines (the dead) in the graves! Glory be to he who surface a path over the ocean. Glory be to he who has the total control over the fire! Glory be to he who surrounds the paradise with his mercy. Glory be to he who will do justice on the day of judgment. Glory be to he who raised the sky! Glory be to he who spread the earth. Glory be to he from whom there is no running away

Several documents confirm the prayer. According to the Iqbal al-A'mal, Sayyed Ibn Tawus narrated the Arafah prayer from Ja'far al-Sadiq, the sixth Imam of Shia, on the authority of Iyas, son of Salamah ibn al-Akwa through a chain of transmission. Abbas Qumi mentioned the prayer in his book entitled Mafatih al-Janan. Kaf'ami narrated the Arafah prayer in his al-Balad al-Amin, but in these works the last folio is missing. The authenticity of this Du'a was reviewed in Shia references such as the Mesbah al-Zayer of Sayyed Ibn Tawus, the Bihar al-Anwar of Allama Majlisi and the Kitab al-Kafi of Muhammad ibn Ya'qūb al-Kulaynī. One Sunni scholar, Shadhili Sufi master Ibn Ata Allah, studied this prayer.

== Content ==
There has been discussion over how many people created this prayer. The sudden change of style in the last three or four pages of the prayer is evidence of an inconsistency. Although many Shia theologians and philosophers considered the second section as an "integral part" of the prayer, Allamah Majlesi, a theologian and jurisprudent of the Safavids period, suggests that the second part could have been added by one of the Sufi shaykhs on the basis of its being in accordance with the "taste of Sufis". Allamah Majlesi also argued that the second part was more probably added after the version by Ibn Tawus. In spite of this "reservation" by Majlesi, the whole prayer is included in standard prayer books and is recited regularly on different occasions due to it being consistent with "Shia spirituality".

During the supplication, Imam Husayn ibn Ali praises Allah. He bears witness that there is no god but Allah, and describes the return of all people to Allah after death. The steps of human creation until his death and the wonders of nature are described by explaining important issues in various branches of science. He suggests the weakness of human beings and the need for them to offer thanks to Allah who does not need their thanks. Some parts end with "peace be upon the prophet". In one part of the prayer, Husayn ibn Ali asks Allah to show him how to come closer to him and to aid in establishing a good relationship with Allah. He describes his neediness and asks Allah to help him to be patient in the face of adversity in the world and the hereafter. The Shia Imam believes that the blessings of Allah are infinite.

== Manner of recitation ==
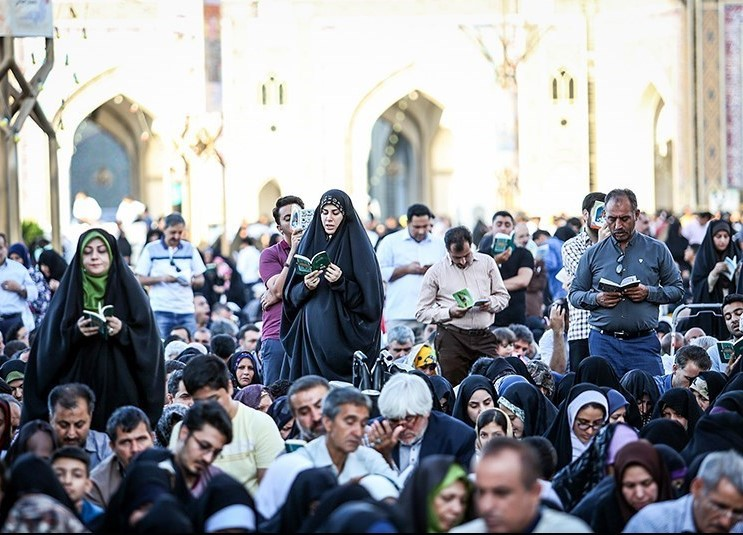
Pilgrims reciting Du'a Arafah in the Imam Reza shrine, Mashhad, Iran

Muslims, especially during the Hajj pilgrimage, recite the Arafah prayer in the Arafat desert from Zuhr prayer to sunset. Imam Hussein recited the prayer during the Hajj.

== Reception ==
The Arafah prayer plays an important role in Shia views. Several Shia theologians and scholars of the hadiths have referred to this prayer in their works, including Mulla Sadra, Mohsen Fayz Kashani and Hajj Molla Hadi Sabzavari.

Goodarzi, an ideologist and writer, wrote about the prayer in a book entitled "The Imam Hussein's good sermon". Also, "The light of Nahjul-Balaghe" by Sadeq Dawoodi explains this prayer.

== See also ==
- Dua-e Ahad
- Du'a al-Baha
- Supplication of Abu Hamza al-Thumali
- Jawshan Kabir
- Mujeer Du'a
- Du'a al-Sabah
