= Dua Allahumma kun li-waliyyik =

Dua al-Faraj (Arabic: دعاء الفرج)" is a supplication which is recited for the health of Hujjat al-Mahdi who is regarded as the last Imam --of Twelver Islam-- and likewise the savior of the world from the oppression (from Shia Islamic viewpoint).

Moreover, the Du'a "Allahumma kun li-waliyyik" is also famous as Dua Faraj between Shia Muslims (as well as the main Du'a al-Faraj which is started with the following sentences:) "O Allah, terrible was the calamity, and its evil consequences are visible, the covering has been removed, (all) hopes have been cut off, the (plentiful) earth has shrunk (with very little to spare), ..."

The (English translated) text of the supplication of "Du'a Allahumma kun li-waliyyik al-Hujjatibnil Hasan" is as follows:

"O Allah, be, for Your representative, the Hujjat (proof), son of AlHassan, Your blessings be on him and his forefathers, In this hour and in every hour, A guardian, a protector, A leader, a helper, A proof, and an eye. Until You make him live on the earth, in obedience (to You), And cause him to live in it for a long time."

== Authenticity ==
This supplication has been narrated by Kulayni in his book al-Kafi, from Muhammad ibn Isa, and he also mentions this from the Salihan (that means Imams of Shia Islam, without applying specific name(s)). Seemingly there have been other narrators between Muhammad ibn Ya'qub al-Kulayni and Muhammad bin Isa ibn ‘Ubaid that have been omitted from the transmission chain because of being a context; i.e. Ahmad ibn Muhammad 'Asemi, Ali ibn Hasan ibn Ali ibn Fazzāl. Moreover, the Du'a "Allahumma kun li-waliyyik" also has been mentioned by others, such as: Sayyid ibn Tavus, Kaf'ami, etc.

== See also ==
- Du'a al-Faraj
- Du'a Kumayl
- Du'a Nudba
- Mujeer Du'a
- Du'a Abu Hamza al-Thumali
