= Dua Simat =

Du'a Simat (Arabic: دعاء السمات), also known as Du'a Shobbur, is an Islamic supplication. This Du'a is mustahab (recommended) to be recited at sunset on Fridays. It is regarded as a prominent supplication. Most old Islamic scholars followed this practice. Muhammad al-Baqir, the fifth Imam of Shia Islam, said, 'I've spoken the truth if I swear to Allah that Ismul Azam is in this supplication." According to Allamah Mohammad Baqir Majlisi, the companions of the Prophet recited it regularly.

== Naming ==
Simāt is the plural form of Sīmah, which means sign. This supplication includes many signs of answering prayers.

== Authenticity ==
This supplication can be found in the books Misbah al-Mutahajjid by Sheikh Tusi, Jamal al-Esbu' by Sayyid ibn Tawus, al-Balad al-Amin by Kaf'ami, Bihar al-Anwar by Muhammad Baqir Majlisi and in prominent documents from Muhammad ibn Uthman Umri, one of the Four Deputies of Mahdi, and with the mediator from Ja'far al-Sadiq.

== Text ==
The initial (English translated) part of Du'a Simat is:

Allah! I beseech Thee through Thy Name, the most great, the most majestic, the most magnificent and the most noble. If Thou art requested therewith to open the closed doors of the sky these will open with Thy mercy. If Thou art requested thereby to remove the narrowness of the doors of the heaven, they will be opened wide. If Thou art requested thereby to make easy the difficulty, it will be easy. If you ...

== See also ==
- Dua Ahd
- Du'a Kumayl
- Mujeer Du'a
- Jawshan Kabir
- Jawshan Saqeer
- Du'a Abu Hamza al-Thumali
- Ismul Azam
