= Dua Tawassul =

Dua Tawassul is the name for various supplications in Islam. This prominent supplication has been written in the book of Bihar al-Anwar. Muslims within the Middle East recite this supplication in religious places, most commonly on Tuesday nights.

== Meaning of Du'a ==
Du'a (or supplication) literally means invocation; according to it, the servants of Allah request or call out Allah for their material and spiritual demands or wishes.

== Meaning of Tawassul ==
Tawassul is regarded among the teachings of most of Muslims, which means to make to take hold of somebody or something that is in a high rank before Allah, and its purpose is getting near to Him and also granting the requests.

== Source of Dua ==
Dua Tawassul which is mentioned in Mafatih al-Janan originates from the book of Bihar al-Anwar. Mohammad-Baqer Majlesi mentions that: "I found this dua in an old manuscript which was written by one of our companions, and it is quoted that: Muhammad ibn Babawayh has narrated this dua from Imams, and for whatever request I recited it, it was granted right away." It is also narrated by Famous Shia Cleric Nasir al-Din al-Tusi, who learned this Dua in dream when he saw Imam Mahdi (A.S).

== Text ==
A part of dua is as follows:

(In the name of Allah, the Beneficent, the Merciful), O Allah, I beseech Thee, and We turn towards Allah with your help, through Thy Prophet, the Prophet of Mercy, Muhammad, may Allah Bless him and his Progeny, and grant them peace. O Abul-Qasim, O Messenger of Allah O guide of mercy, O intercessor of the community, O our chief, O our master, We We turn towards Allah with your help, seek thy intercession and advocacy before Allah, We call upon you before [mentioning] our requests [to Allah]; O intimate of Allah, Stand by us when Allah sits in judgment over us..."

== See also ==
- Du'a Kumayl
- Du'a Nudba
- Dua Al-Ahd
- Mujeer Du'a
- Du'a Abu Hamza al-Thumali
- Du'a al-Faraj
