= Ziyarat Ale Yasin =

Ziyarat Ale Yasin (Arabic: زیارة آل یاسین) is regarded as a well-known Ziyarat (piece of salutation) which is associated with Mahdi who is an eschatological redeemer of Islam that will reappear and he will rid the world of all wicked and bad things (evil). Mahdi is also considered as the last (The Twelfth) Imam of Shia Islam.

According to sources, Ale Yasin is referred to Ahl al-Bayt. This Ziyarat is begun with the following phrase: “Greetings be to the offspring of Yasin”. Abu Jafar Muhammad b. ‘Abdullah al Himyary al Qommi as the narrator of this Ziyarat was lived in the terminal period of the minor occultation and likewise many of his letters to the twelfth Imam of Shia (Mahdi) have been narrated, according to source(s). One Tawqi which contains the Ziyarat Ale Yasin, can be considered as one of those letters. Sheikh Abbas Qomi narrates Ziyarat Ale Yasin in Mafatih al-Janan as the first Ziyarat for Imam Mahdi.

Ziyarat Ale Yasin starts with the following phrases:

"Peace be upon (the) progeny of Yaseen. Peace be upon you, O the caller of Allah and place of manifestation of His signs. Peace be upon you, O the door of Allah and the devout one of His religion. Peace be upon you, O the vicegerent of Allah and the helper of His truth. Peace be upon you, O the proof of Allah and the Guide of His intention. Peace be upon you, O the reciter of Allah's book and its interpreter."

حسينية_دار_المجتبي_دولة_الكويت

== See also ==
- Ahl al-Bayt
- Reappearance of Mahdi
