= Du'a al-Baha =

Islamic prayer recommended to Muslims to recite in pre-dawns during Ramadan

Du'a al-Baha (Arabic: دعاء البهاء) (known as Du'a al-Sahar (Arabic: دعاء السحر) is a Du'a recommended to Muslims to recite in pre-dawns during Ramadan, when Muslims usually eat Suhur. Since it is very common among Shia, it is known Dua al-Sahar (supplication of pre-dawn), despite the fact that there are other supplications for pre-dawns of Ramadan.

Du'a al-Baha has also been the subject of scholarly translations and studies that examine its theological language and devotional role in Islamic spirituality. Researchers note that the supplication repeatedly invokes different divine attributes such as beauty, majesty, greatness, and knowledge reflecting a structured form of praise and petition common in classical Islamic devotional literature. Because of its rich language and spiritual themes, the prayer has been translated and analyzed in academic works on Islamic texts and religious practice.

== Chain of authority ==
The Du'a ascribed to Muhammad al-Baqir, fifth Shia Imam, and reported by Ali ibn Musa al-Riḍha, eighth Shia Imam.

== Authenticity ==
It is mentioned in Mafatih al-Jinan by Abbas Qumi.

== Contents ==
Dua al-Baha has 23 paragraphs which starts with “O Allah, I ask You to...” and beseech all of his glories, beauties, loftiness, greatness, luminosity, compassion, words, perfections, names, might, volition, omnipotence, knowledge, speeches, questions, honors, authorities, dominions, highness, bounties and signs. Then it is said: “O Allah, I ask You to give me whereby You gives answer to my supplication whenever I turn to You; therefore, hear my prayers, O Allah!”

== Interpretation ==
Several scholar including Ruhollah Khomeini, founder of Islamic revolution, wrote some books to explain the supplication. Description of the Dawn prayer (Sharhe Du'a al-Sahar) is Khomeini's first book.

== See also ==
- Supplication of Abu Hamza al-Thumali
- Mujeer Du'a
- Jawshan Kabir
- Dua Ahd
- Du'a Kumayl
- Du'a Nudba
