= Du'a al-Sabah =

Spiritual hymn & supplication recited by "Ali", the first Imam of Shia Muslims

Shia Islam Invocations
- Supplication of: Sabah
- Quoted from: "Ikhtiar al-Misbah", "Bihar al-Anwar" and "Salah"
- Attributed to: Ali ibn Abi Taleb (learned from Muhammad, the Prophet of Islam)

Du'a al-Sabah (Arabic: دُعاء الصَّباح) (literally the supplication of Sabah, means: orison of the morning) is a prayer advised by the first Imam of the Shiites, Ali ibn Abi Talib, to be recited in the morning. This prayer was written on the 28th of September in the year 646 (11th of Dhu al-Hijjah in the year 25 AH) by Ali ibn Abi Talib, learned from Muhammad ibn Abdullah, the Prophet of Islam. Du'a al-Sabah is mentioned by Mohammad-Baqer Majlesi in his books Bihar al-Anwar and Salah. In a treatise by Yahya ibn Qasim Alavi (seventh century AH), it is claimed that a copy of this prayer was written in Kufic script by Imam Ali himself. The oldest authentication related to the Du'a al-Sabah is the book "Ikhtiar al-Misbah" written by "Sayyid Ali ibn al-Husayn ibn Hessan ibn al-Baqi al-Qurashi" in 1255 (653 AH).

This prayer is also known as the Du'a al-Sabah of Amir al-Mu'minin, and most of the material contained in this prayer, is consistent with the teachings of "Quran and Islamic narrations" and has been mentioned in other prayers. Mohammad-Baqer Majlesi advised to recite this prayer after the dawn salah; Sayyid ibn Baqi also recommends reciting it after the dawn supererogatory salah.

== Text ==
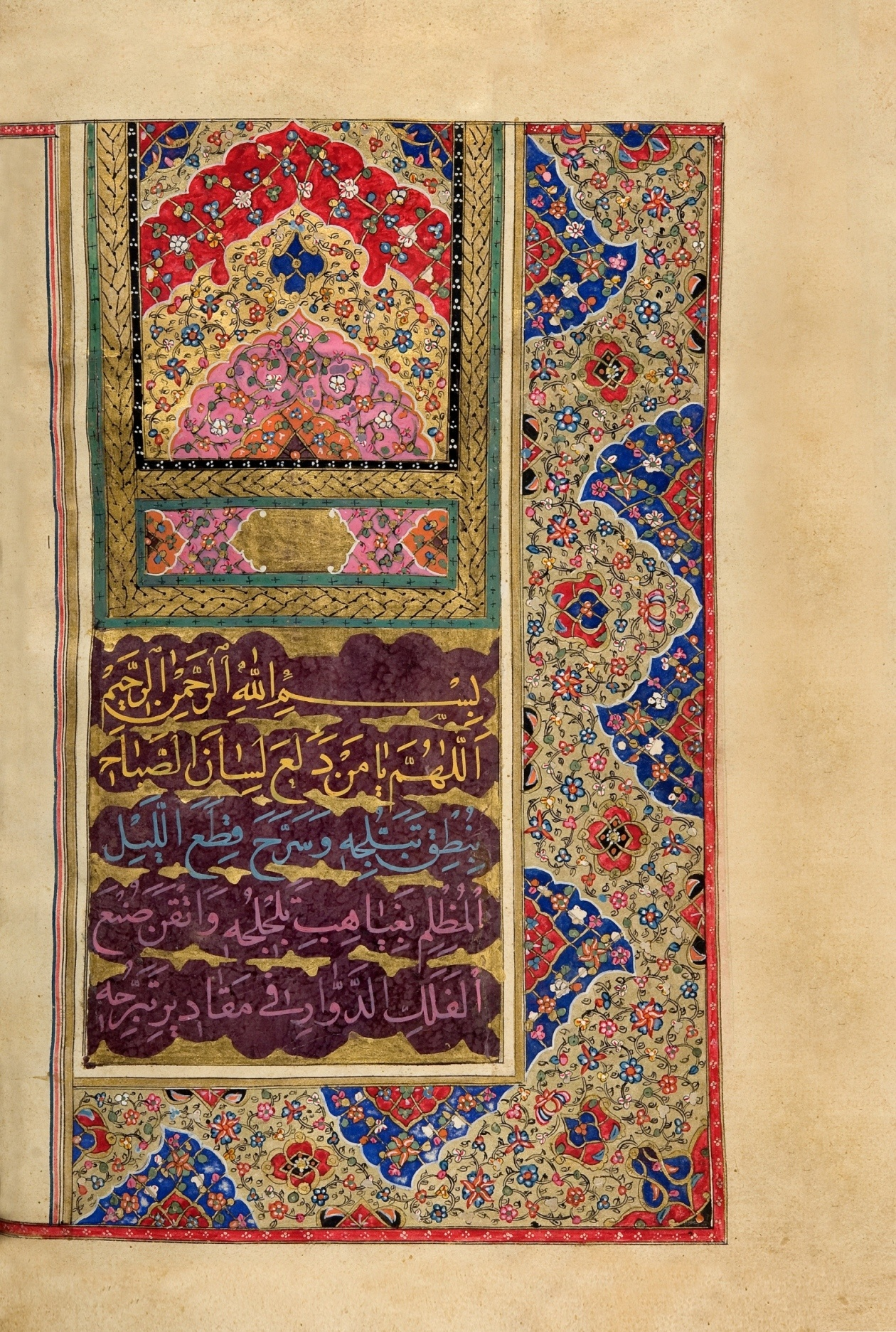
A manuscript of the beginning of Du'a al-Sabah written by Omm Salmeh Khanom, Fath-Ali Shah Qajar's daughter.

The text of the Du'a al-Sabah is as follows:

In the Name of Allah, the Beneficent, the Merciful.	بِسْمِ اللهِ الرَّحْمنِ الرَّحِيمِ
Oh God, Oh He who extended the morning's tongue in the speech of its dawning	اَللّـهُمَّ يا مَنْ دَلَعَ لِسانَ الصَّباحِ بِنُطْقِ تَبَلُّجِهِ
And dispatched the fragments of the dark night into the gloom of its stammering	وَ سَرَّحَ قِطَعَ الّلَيْلِ الْمُظْلِمِ بِغَياهِبِ تَلَجْلُجِهِ
And made firm the structure of the turning spheres in the measures of its display	وَ اَتْقَنَ صُنْعَ الْفَلَكِ الدَّوّارِ في مَقاديرِ تَبَرُّجِهِ
And beamed forth the brightness of the sun through the light of its blazing!	وَ شَعْشَعَ ضِياءَ الشَّمْسِ بِنُورِ تَاَجُّجِهِ
Oh He who demonstrates His Essence by His Essence	يا مَنْ دَلَّ عَلى ذاتِهِ بِذاتِهِ
And transcends congeneity with His creatures	وَ تَنَزَّهَ عَنْ مُجانَسَةِ مَخْلُوقاتِهِ
And is exalted beyond conformity with His qualities!	وَ جَلَّ عَنْ مُلاءَمَةِ كَيْفِيّاتِهِ
Oh He who is near to the passing thoughts of opinions	يا مَنْ قَرُبَ مِنْ خَطَراتِ الظُّنُونِ
And far from the regards of eyes	وَ بَعُدَ عَنْ لَحَظاتِ الْعُيُونِ
And knows what will be before it comes to be!	وَ عَلِمَ بِما كانَ قَبْلَ اَنْ يَكُونَ
Oh He who has put me at ease in the cradle of His security and sanctuary	يا مَنْ اَرْقَدَني في مِهادِ اَمْنِهِ وَ اَمانِهِ
And awakened me to the favors and kindness that He has bestowed upon me	وَ اَيْقَظَني إلى ما مَنَحَني بِهِ مِنْ مِنَنِهِ وَ اِحْسانِهِ
And held me from the claws of evil with His hand and His force!	وَ كَفَّ اَكُفَّ السُّوءِ عَنّي بِيَدِهِ وَ سُلْطانِهِ
Bless, oh God, the guide to Thee in the darkest night	صَلِّ اللّـهُمَّ عَلَى الدَّليلِ اِلَيْكَ فِي اللَّيْلِ الأَلْيَلِ
And him who, of Thy ropes, clings to the cord of the longest nobility	وَ الْماسِكِ مِنْ اَسْبَابِكَ بِحَبْلِ الشَّرَفِ الأَطْوَلِ
And him whose glory is evident at the summit of stout shoulders	وَ النّاصِعِ الْحَسَبِ في ذِرْوَةِ الْكاهِلِ الأَعْبَلِ
And whose feet were entrenched in spite of slippery places in ancient time	وَ الثّابِتِ الْقَدَمِ عَلى زَحاليفِها فِي الزَّمَنِ الأَوَّلِ
And [bless] his household, the good, the chosen, the pious	وَ عَلى آلِهِ الأَخْيارِ الْمُصْطَفِيْنَ الأَبْرارِ
And open for us, oh God, the leaves of morning's door	وَ افْتَحِ اللّـهُمَّ لَنا مَصاريعَ الصَّباحِ
With the keys of mercy and prosperity!	بِمَفاتيحِ الرَّحْمَةِ وَ الْفَلاحِ
And clothe me, oh God, with the most excellent robes of guidance and righteousness!	وَ اَلْبِسْنِي اللّـهُمَّ مِنْ اَفْضَلِ خِلَعِ الْهِدايَةِ وَ الصَّلاحِ
And plant, oh God, through Thy tremendousness, the springs of humility in the watering place of my heart!	وَ اَغْرِسِ اللّـهُمَّ بِعَظَمَتِكَ في شِرْبِ جَناني يَنابيعَ الخُشُوعِ
And cause to flow, oh God, because of Thy awesomeness, tears of moaning from the corner of my eyes!	وَ اَجْرِ اللّـهُمَّ لِهَيْبَتِكَ مِنْ آماقي زَفَراتِ الدُّمُوعِ
And chastise, oh God, the recklessness of my clumsiness with the reins of contentment!	وَ أَدِّبِ اللّـهُمَّ نَزَقَ الْخُرْقِ مِنّي بِاَزِمَّةِ الْقُنُوعِ
My God, if mercy from Thee does not begin with fair success for me	اِلـهي اِنْ لَمْ تَبْتَدِئنِي الرَّحْمَةُ مِنْكَ بِحُسْنِ التَّوْفيقِ
Then who can take me to Thee upon the evident path?	فَمَنِ السّالِكُ بي اِلَيْكَ في واضِحِ الطَّريقِ
If Thy deligerateness would turn me over to the guide of hope and wishes	وَ اِنْ اَسْلَمَتْني اَناتُكَ لِقائِدِ الأَمَلِ وَالْمُنى
Then who will annul my slips from the stumbles of caprice?	فَمَنِ الْمُقيلُ عَثَراتي مِنْ كَبَواتِ الْهَوى
If Thy help should forsake me in the battle with the soul and Satan	وَ اِنْ خَذَلَني نَصْرُكَ عِنْدَ مُحارَبَةِ النَّفْسِ وَ الشَّيْطانِ
Then Thy forsaking will have entrusted me to where there is hardship and deprivation	فَقَدْ وَكَلَني خِذْلانُكَ إلى حَيْثُ النَّصَبُ وَ الْحِرْمانُ
My God, dost Thou see that I have only come to Thee from the direction of hopes	اِلـهي اَتَراني ما اَتَيْتُكَ إلاّ مِنْ حَيْثُ الآمالِ
Or clung to the ends of Thy cords when my sins have driven me from the house of union?	عَلِقْتُ بِاَطْرافِ حِبالِكَ إلاّ حينَ باعَدَتْني ذُنُوبي عَنْ دارِ الْوِصالِ
So what an evil mount upon which my soul has mounted - its caprice!	فَبِئْسَ الْمَطِيَّةُ الَّتي امْتَطَتْ نَفْسي مِنْ هَواهـا
Woe upon it for being seduced by its own opinions and wishes!	فَواهاً لَها لِما سَوَّلَتْ لَها ظُنُونُها وَ مُناها
And destruction be upon it for its audacity toward its Master and Protector!	وَ تَبّاً لَها لِجُرْاَتِها عَلى سَيِّدِها وَ مَوْلاها
My God, I have knocked upon the door of Thy mercy with the hand of my hope	اِلـهي قَرَعْتُ بابَ رَحْمَتِكَ بِيَدِ رَجائي
And fled to Thee seeking refuge from my excessive caprice	وَ هَرَبْتُ اِلَيْكَ لاجِئاً مِنْ فَرْطِ اَهْوائي
And fixed the fingers of my love to the ends of Thy cords	وَ عَلَّقْتُ بِاَطْرافِ حِبالِكَ اَنامِلَ وَلائي
So pardon, oh God, the slips and errors I have committed	فَاْصْفَحِ اللّـهُمَّ عَمّا كُنْتُ اَجْرَمْتُهُ مِنْ زَلَلي وَ خَطائي
And release me from the foot-tangling of my robe	وَ اَقِلْني مِنْ صَرْعَةِ رِدائي
For Thou art my Master, my Protector, my Support and my Hope	فَاِنَّكَ سَيِّدي وَ مَوْلاي وَ مُعْتَمَدي وَ رَجائي
And Thou art the object of my search and my desire in my ultimate end and stable abode	وَ اَنْتَ غايَةُ مَطْلُوبي وَ مُناي في مُنْقَلَبي وَ مَثْواىَ
My God, how couldst Thou drive away a poor beggar who seeks refuge in Thee from sins, fleeing?	اِلـهي كَيْفَ تَطْرُدُ مِسْكيناً الْتَجَأَ اِلَيْكَ مِنَ الذُّنُوبِ هارِباً
Or how couldst Thou disappoint one seeking guidance who repairs to Thy threshold, running?	اَمْ كَيْفَ تُخَيِّبُ مُسْتَرْشِداً قَصَدَ إلى جَنابِكَ ساعِياً
Or how could You reject a thirsty man who comes to Your wells to drink?	اَمْ كَيْفَ تَرُدُّ ظَمآناً وَرَدَ إلى حِياضِكَ شارِباً
Never! For Thy pools are full in the hardship of drought	كَلاّ وَحِياضُكَ مُتْرَعَةٌ في ضَنْكِ الُْمُحُولِ
Thy door is open for seeking and penetration	وَ بابُكَ مَفْتُوحٌ لِلطَّلَبِ وَ الْوُغُولِ
And Thou art the goal of requests and the object of hopes	وَ اَنْتَ غايَةُ الْمَسْؤولِ وَ نِهايَةُ الْمَأمُولِ
My God, these are the reins of my soul I have bound them with the ties of Thy will	اِلـهي هذِهِ اَزِمَّةُ نَفْسي عَقَلْتُها بِعِقالِ مَشِيَّتِكَ
These are the burdens of my sins I have averted them with Thy pardon and mercy	وَ هذِهِ اَعْباءُ ذُنُوبي دَرَأتُها بِعَفْوِكَ وَ رَحْمَتِكَ
these are my caprices that lead astray - I have entrusted them to the threshold of Thy gentleness and kindliness	وَ هذِهِ اَهْوائِي الْمُضِلَّةُ وَكَلْتُها إلى جَنابِ لُطْفِكَ وَ رَأفَتِكَ
So make this morning of mine, oh God, descend upon me with the radiance of guidance	فَاجْعَلِ اللّـهُمَّ صَباحي هذا ناِزلاً عَلَي بِضِياءِ الْهُدى
and with safety in religion and this world!	وَ بِالسَّلامَة فِي الدّينِ وَ الدُّنْيا
And [make] my evening a shield against the deception of enemies	وَ مَسائي جُنَّةً مِنْ كَيْدِ الْعِدى
And a protection against the destructive blows of caprice!	وَ وِقايَهً مِنْ مُرْدِياتِ الْهَوى
Thou art able over what Thou wilt!	اِنَكَ قادِرٌ عَلى ما تَشاءُ
Thou givest the kingdom to whom Thou wilt, and Thou seizest the kingdom from whom Thou wilt	تُؤتِي الْمُلْكَ مَنْ تَشاءُ ، وَ تَنْزِعُ الْمُلْكَ مِمَّنْ تَشاءُ
Thou exaltest whom Thou wilt, and Thou abasest whom Thou wilt	وَ تُعِزُّ مَنْ تَشاءُ ، وَ تُذِلُّ مَنْ تَشاءُ
In Thy hand is the good, Thou art powerful over all things	بِيَدِكَ الْخَيْرُ اِنَّـكَ عَلى كُلِّ شَيْء قَديرٌ
Thou makest the night to enter into the day, and Thou makest the day to enter into the night	تُولِجُ اللَيْلَ في النَّهارِ ، وَ تُولِجُ النَّهارَ فِي اللَّيْلِ
Thou bringest forth the living from the dead, and Thou bringest forth dead from the living	وَ تُخْرِجُ الْحَيَّ مِنَ الْمَيِّتِ ، وَ تُخْرِجُ الْمَيِّتَ مِنَ الْحَي
and Thou providest whomsoever Thou wilt without reckoning	وَ تَرْزُقُ مَنْ تَشاءُ بِغَيْرِ حِساب
There is no god but Thou! Glory be to Thee, oh God, and Thine is the praise!	لا اِلـهَ إلاّ اَنْتَ سُبْحانَكَ اللّـهُمَّ وَ بِحَمْدِكَ
Who knows Thy measure without fearing Thee?	مَنْ ذا يَعْرِفُ قَدْرَكَ فَلا يَخافُكَ
Who knows what Thou art without awe of Thee?	وَ مَن ذا يَعْلَمُ ما اَنْتَ فَلا يَهابُكَ
Through Thy power Thou hast joined disparate things	اَلَّفْتَ بِقُدْرَتِكَ الْفِرَقَ
And through Thy gentleness Thou hast cleaved apart the daybreak	وَ فَلَقْتَ بِلُطْفِكَ الْفَلَقَ
And through Thy generosity Thou hast illumined the dark shrouds of night	وَ اَنَرْتَ بِكَرَمِكَ دَياجِي الْغَسَقِ
Thou hast made waters, sweet and salt, flow forth from hard shining stones	وَ اَنْهَرْتَ الْمِياهَ مِنَ الصُّمِّ الصَّياخيدِ عَذْباً وَ اُجاجاً
And sent down out of rain-clouds water cascading	وَ اَنْزَلْتَ مِنَ الْمُعْصِراتِ ماءً ثَجّاجاً
And appointed the sun and moon a blazing lamp for the creatures	وَ جَعَلْتَ الشَّمْسَ وَ الْقَمَرَ لِلْبَرِيَّةِ سِراجاً وَهّاجاً
Without experiencing in that which Thou originated either weariness or effort	مِنْ غَيْرِ اَنْ تُمارِسَ فيما ابْتَدَأتَ بِهِ لُغُوباً وَ لا عِلاجاً
So, oh He who is alone in might and subsistence	فَيا مَنْ تَوَحَّدَ بِالْعِزِّ وَ الْبَقاءِ
And dominates His slaves with death and annihilation	قَهَرَ عِبادَهُ بِالْمَوْتِ وَ الْفَناءِ
Bless Muhammad and his household, the godfearing	صَلِّ عَلى مُحَمَّد وَ آلِهِ الاَْتْقِياءِ
And answer my supplication hear my call	وَ اسْمَعْ نِدائي ، وَ اسْتَجِبْ دُعائي
And actualize through Thy bounty my hope and desire	وَ حَقِّقْ بِفَضْلِكَ اَمَلي وَ رَجائي
Oh best of those who is called to remove affliction	يا خَيْرَ مَنْ دُعِي لِكَشْفِ الضُّرِّ
And object of hope in every difficulty and ease!	وَ الْمَأمُولِ لِكُلِّ عُسْر وَ يُسْر
I have stated my need, so do not reject me, oh my master, despairing of Thy exalted gifts	بِكَ اَنْزَلْتُ حاجَتي فَلا تَرُدَّني مِنْ سَنِيِّ مَواهِبِكَ خائِباً
Oh All-generous! Oh All-generous! Oh All-generous!	يا كَريمُ ، يا كَريمُ ، يا كَريمُ
By Thy mercy, oh Most Merciful of the merciful!	بِرَحْمَتِكَ يا اَرْحَمَ الرّاحِمينَ
And God bless the best of His creatures, Muhammad, and all his household!	وَ صَلَّى اللهُ عَلى خَيْرِ خَلْقِهِ مُحَمَّد وَ آلِهِ اَجْمَعينَ
Then prostrate and say: My God, my heart is veiled	ثمّ اسجد و قل : اِلـهي قَلْبي مَحْجُوبٌ
My soul is deficient	وَ نَفْسي مَعْيُوبٌ
My intelligence is defeated	وَ عَقْلي مَغْلُوبٌ
My caprice is triumphant	وَ هَوائي غالِبٌ
My obedience is little	وَ طاعَتي قَليلٌ
My disobedience is much	وَ مَعْصِيَتي كَثيرٌ
And my tongue acknowledges sins	وَ لِساني مُقِرٌّ بِالذُّنُوبِ
So what am I to do? Oh He who covers defects!	فَكَيْفَ حيلَتي يا سَتّارَ الْعُيُوبِ
Oh He who knows the unseen things!	وَ يا عَلاّمَ الْغُيُوبِ
Oh He who removes troubles	وَ يا كاشِفَ الْكُرُوبِ
Forgive my sins, all of them, by the sacredness of Muhammad and the household of Muhammad!	اِغْفِرْ ذُنُوبي كُلَّها بِحُرْمَةِ مُحَمَّد وَ آلِ مُحَمَّد
Oh All-forgiver! Oh All-forgiver! Oh All-forgiver!	يا غَفّارُ ، يا غَفّارُ ، يا غَفّارُ
By Thy mercy, oh Most Merciful of the mercifull!	بِرَحْمَتِكَ يا اَرْحَمَ الرّاحِمينَ

== See also ==
- Du'a Kumayl
- Dua Tawassul
- Du'a Nudba
- Dua Al-Ahd
- Mujeer Du'a
- Du'a Abu Hamza al-Thumali
- Du'a al-Faraj
- Du'a Arafah
- Du'a al-Baha
