= Al-Zahra Mosque (Los Angeles) =

Mosque in Los Angeles, CA, USA

- Arabic: مسجد-الزهراء
- Location in southern Los Angeles

Religion
- Affiliation: Shia (Twelver)
- Ecclesiastical or organisational status: Mosque
- Status: Active

Location
- Location: Los Angeles, California
- Country: United States
- Coordinates: 33°57′47″N 118°13′20″W

Architecture
- Type: Mosque
- Style: Iranian architecture
- Founder: An Iraqi Shia man, named "Hakim"
- Completed: 1990

Al-Zahra Mosque is a Twelver Shia mosque, located in the city of Los Angeles, California, in the United States. The Shi'i mosque was founded in 1990, to meet the needs of the Los Angeles Shi'a community.

== History ==
According to Seyyed-Ruhollah Jayedi, head of the Al-Zahra mosque, the mosque may be the first Shi'a mosque or among the first Shia mosques in America; and some other Islamic centers in the city of Los-Angeles are considered to be a branch of this mosque. Al-Zahra Mosque was built by an Iraqi businessman—named Hakim in 1990.

The name of Al-Zahra Mosque is taken from the name of Fatimah Zahra—the daughter of the Islamic prophet, Muhammad. Among the daily/weekly programs of Al-Zahra mosque are as follows: daily prayers, Friday-prayer (per Friday), Dua-Kumayl, Dua-Tawassul, and so on.

== See also ==
- Ahl Al-Bayt World Assembly
- Al-Zahra Mosque (Australia)
- Shia Islam in the United States
- List of mosques in the United States
