= Jawshan Sagheer =

Islamic prayer

Jawshan Sagheer (Arabic: ٱلْجَوْشَن ٱلصَّغِير) is an Islamic supplication which has been quoted in prominent books in a wider description than Dua Jawshan Kabir; and is named as a high dignity Dua which is profitable against the calamity and oppressors. It is also mentioned that reciting this supplication is effective in repelling the enemy.

Jawshan Sagheer has been mentioned as a high/worthful Dua; and it is reported that: "when Hadi Abbasi intended to kill Musa ibn Jafar, Musa recited it, as a result, he dreamed of the Islamic prophet Muhammad that told him: Allah will annihilate your enemy."

In regards to the references of the Dua, it was narrated by Musa ibn Jafar (as the seventh Imam of Shia Islam), and Sayyed Ibn Tawus has quoted it in Muhaj al-Da'awat; it has also been quoted by Kaf'ami in al-Balad al-Amin, Majlisi in Bahar al-Anwar; and by Sheikh Abbas Qomi in Mafatih al-Janan.

== Text ==
The first part of Jawshan Sagheer is as follows:

My God, many an enemy drew up the sword of hostility against me, honed the dagger's edge, sharpened the arrows' points, made ready deadly poisons, leveled his bow at me, and, keeping an eye on me, harbored evil thoughts to force me to swallow, against my will, the deadly bitter poison. Thou came to know that I am too weak to bear hardships and too exhausted to withstand misfortunes, and took notice of my shortcoming that I cannot confront the enemy who had planned to attack me, and ...

== See also ==
- Dua Ahd
- Mujeer Du'a (Dua Mujeer)
- Du'a Nudba
- Du'a al-Faraj
- The supplication of opening
- Supplication of Abu Hamza al-Thumali
