= Mafatih al-hayat =

Mafatih al-Hayat
- Author: Ayatollah Javadi Amoli
- Original title: مفاتیح الحیاه
- Language: Persian
- Genre: Religious
- Publication date: 2012
- Publication place: Iran
- Pages: 776

Mafatih al-Hayat (Arabic: مفاتیح الحیاه, "keys to life") is a religious work written by Ayatollah Javadi Amoli intended to complete Mafatih al-Janan, a book by Sheikh Abbas Qummi.

== Authors ==
The authors of Mafatih al-Hayat are a team of writers working at the Qom Seminary under Ayatollah Javadi Amoli.

== Release ==
The book, which was published in 2012, has been reprinted by Qom's Isra Publication Centre 150 times within two years of its release. When first displayed in the 2012 Tehran International Book Exhibition it was very well received.

== Differences from Mafatih al-Janan ==
In Amoli's own words, Mafatih al-Janan focuses on how humans can pursue the right path in the light of God. By contrast, Mafatih al-Hayat discusses the ways man can interact and communicate with other creatures.

== Summary ==
Mafatih al-Hayat is divided into five main parts and a sixth final part:

- The first part is on the interaction of humans with themselves. The chapters in this section include: thinking, learning, keeping the body clean, eat, dress, adornment, accommodation, travel, sleep, leisure, sports and so on.
- The second part, on interactions with others, has chapters on fellow Muslims, foreigners, the poor, enemies, citizens and so on.
- The third part is on the interaction between people and the Islamic regime, discussing political, social, municipal and economic affairs.
- The fourth part of Mafatih al-Hayat is on human interaction with animals and discusses taking care of animals, enjoying animals, animal rights, etc.
- The fifth part is about human interaction with the environment, including environmental issues, soil, trees, green space, wind, rain, rivers, roads, fuel, tourism and so on.
- The final part includes work on lunar months, traditions and so on.
