= Ziyarat Ashura =

Islamic salutatory prayer to God

Ziyarat Ashura (Arabic: زیارة عاشوراء) is an Islamic salutatory prayer to God. The prayer is part of the liturgy used in pilgrimages to the shrine of Husayn in Karbala. Muhammad al-Baqir, Prophet's descendant and the fifth Shia Imam, recommended reciting Ziyarat Ashura on Ashura while facing Karbala, as a symbolic visit to the shrine.

== Etymology ==
In Islam, a ziyārah (Arabic: زیارة) is a visit to the tomb of a saint or other holy person, such as the Islamic prophet Muhammad or Imam Husayn.

‘Āshūrā’ (Arabic: عاشوراء), literally "tenth", is a holiday and a day of grief for the Muslims, falling on 10 Muharram of the Islamic calendar. The Martyrdom of Husayn ibn Ali and his family members and his associate (72 Martyrs) during the Battle of Karbala is commemorated on this day.

== Sources ==
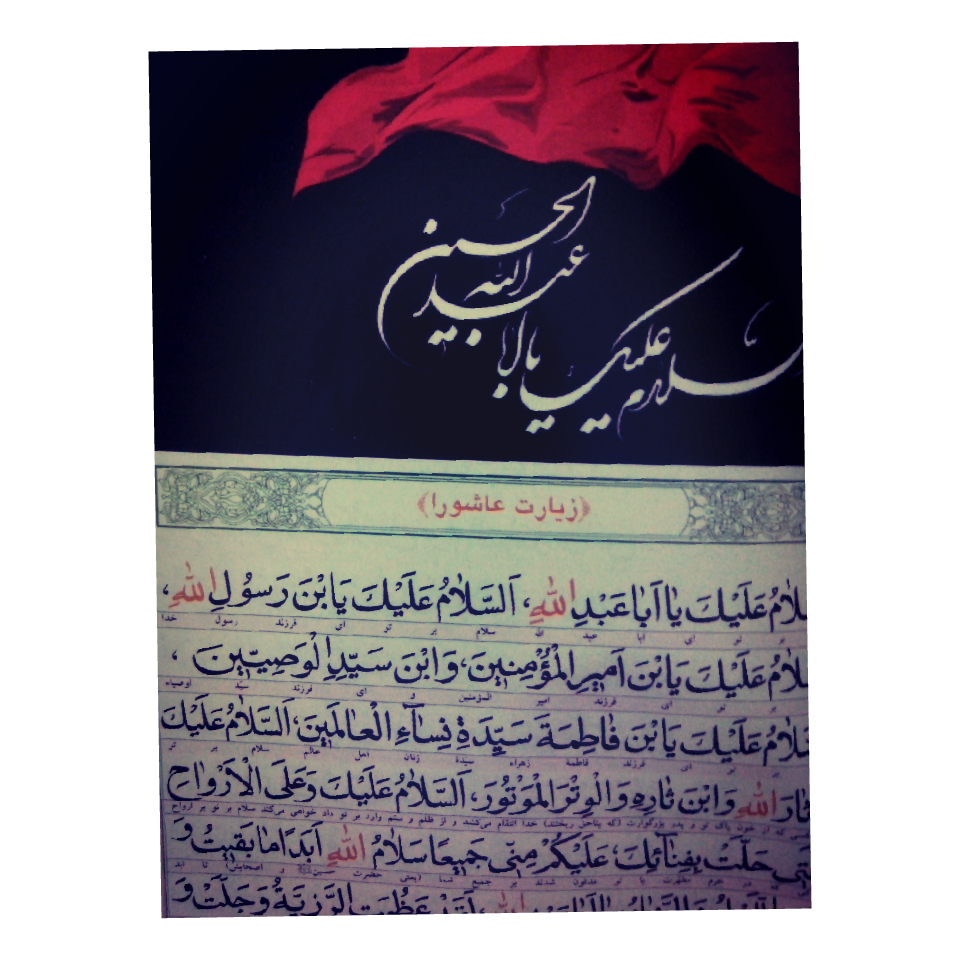
First page of Ziyarat Ashura

Ziyarat Ashura is attributed to Muhammad al-Baqir, the fifth Shia Imam, who transmitted it to his followers. The prayer is found in sacred hadith narrated in particular by Shaykh Tusi in Misbah al-Mutahajjid and by Ibn Qulawayh in Kamil al-Ziyarat: The prayer is also referenced in Bihar al-Anwar by Allamah al-Majlisi and Mafatih al-Jinan by Abbas Qumi.

== Contents ==
Ziyarat Ashura contains concepts like tabarra (dissociating from those who oppose God, oppose Muhammad or oppose his family), tawalla (loving the Ahl al-Bayt), self-sacrifice for society, and never surrendering to tyranny and oppression.

== Dua Alqamah ==
Dua Alqamah (Persian: دعای علقمه ) is the title of the supplication recited after Ziyarat Ashura by Shia Muslims. It is attributed to Muhammad al-Baqir, the fifth Shia Imam, who transmitted it to his followers. Alqamah is referred to one of companion of Ja'far al-Sadiq, the sixth Imam of the Shia, named Alqamah. According to the tradition in Mafatih al-Janan (Keys to the Heavens), Abbas Qumi believed this supplication is in honor of one companion of Ja'far al-Sadiq, named Safwan. So, the original name of the supplication is Safwan. According to the Mafatih al-Janan, Abbas Qumi narrated the Alqamah prayer from Muhammad al-Baqir, the fifth Imam of Shia, on day of Ashura by the authority of Alqamah ibn Mohammad ibn Hazrami through a chain of transmission.

== See also ==
- Arba'een Pilgrimage
- Battle of Karbala
- Rawda Khwani
