= Iman (Islam) =

Conception of faith in Islam

Iman (Arabic: إِيمَان, romanized: ʾīmān, lit. 'faith' or 'belief', also 'recognition') in Islamic theology denotes a believer's recognition of faith and deeds in the religious aspects of Islam. Its most simple definition is the belief in the six articles of faith, known as arkān al-īmān. Shia theologians have proposed several theories regarding faith—or in its Arabic form, "Iman". Some assert that faith consists of a single pillar; the belief held in the heart—the most inner and honest part of human being. Consequently, faith is defined as the affirmation of the heart, with verbal confession and actions playing no role in its actualization.

The term iman has been delineated in both the Quran and hadith. According to the Quran, iman must be accompanied by righteous deeds and the two together are necessary for entry into Jannah ("Heaven"). According to the Quran, the seat of faith is the inner heart, the innermost part of human perception, while the seat of "Islam" is the intellect. In the hadith, iman in addition to Islam and ihsan form the three dimensions of the Islamic religion.

There exists a debate both within and outside Islam on the link between faith and reason in religion, and the relative importance of either. Some scholars contend that faith and reason spring from the same source and must be harmonious.

== Definition ==
In a hadith, the Islamic prophet Muhammad defined iman as "an acknowledgement in the heart, a voicing with the tongue, and an activity with the limbs." Faith is confidence in a real truth. When people have confidence, they submit themselves to that truth. It is not sufficient just to know the truth, but the recognition of the heart should be expressed by the tongue which is the manifestation of intelligence and at last to reflect this confidence in their activities.

Hamiduddin Farahi, while explaining the meaning of iman in his exegesis, wrote:

"The root of imān is ‘amana. It is used in various shades of meaning. One of its derivatives is mu'min, which is among the noble names of Allah because He gives peace to those who seek His refuge. This word is also an ancient religious term. Hence the certitude which exists with humility, trust and all the conditions and corollaries of adherence to a view is called imān and he who professes faith in Allah, in His signs and His directives and submits himself to Him and is pleased with all His decisions is a mu'min."

The definition of iman according to Ahl al-Sunnah wa'l-Jama'ah is:

"Giving recognition with the heart, saying with the tongue, and doing with the limbs; it increases with obedience and decreases with sins."

Ibn 'Abd al-Barr said:

"The people of jurisprudence and hadith are unanimous that Iman is speech and action, and there is no action except with the intention."

Al-Shafi'i said in Kitab al-Umm:

"[A]nd the consensus was from the sahabas, and the Tabi'een. After them, we realized that Iman is saying and doing, and intention is one of the three, those are not sufficient alone without the others."

Muhammad bin Ismail bin Muhammad bin Al-Fadl Al-Taymi Al-Asbhani said:

"And Iman in the language of the law is ratification with the heart, and action with the limbs."

Sufyan ibn 'Uyaynah said:

"Iman is saying and deed, it increases and decreases."

Al-Ash'ari said:

"They are unanimously agreed that Iman (recognition) increases with obedience and decreases with sins, and its deficiency does not mean that we doubt about what we are commanded to believe in, nor our ignorance of it, because that is kufr or rejection from the religion, instead it is a decrease in the rank of knowledge or mind and an increase in our sayings, similar to that, the weight of our obedience and the obedience of the Prophet (may God bless him and grant him peace) differs, even if we are all performing our duty."

== Effects and characteristics ==
Many verses of the Quran discuss faith, its effects, and its characteristics. Consequently, faith is distinct from Islam and is considered to be at a higher level. Faith embodies a profound truth that fosters a deep love for God. God guides believers out of "darkness" and into the realm of "lights".

According to the Quran, faith can both increase and decrease, and the hearts of believers achieve certainty and stability through it. The Quran also states that no one can be compelled or forced into faith or belief.

In the verses of the Quran, the mistakes, shortcomings, and sins of believers are highlighted, urging them to reform themselves.

== Six Articles of Faith ==
Faith (iman) includes six primary beliefs:

1. Belief in the existence and oneness of God (Tawhid, the Islamic concept of monotheism).
2. Belief in the existence of angels such as Gabriel, Michael, and Raphael.
3. Belief in the existence of the books of which God is the author: the Quran (revealed to Muhammad), the Gospel (revealed to Jesus), the Torah (revealed to Moses), Psalms (revealed to David), the Scrolls of Moses, and the Scrolls of Abraham.
4. Belief in the existence of prophets: Muhammad being final, Jesus the penultimate, and others sent before them such as Moses, Abraham, David, Joseph, Jacob.
5. Belief in the existence of the Day of Judgment: On the day, humanity will be divided into two groups: those going to paradise and those going to hell. These groups are composed of subgroups.
6. Belief in the existence of God's predestination (qadar, 'Divine Decree') due to God's omniscience, whether it involves good or bad.

Of these, the first four are mentioned and the fifth implied in ayah 2:285 of the Quran. All six appear in the first hadith of the collection Sahih Muslim, where the angel Gabriel asks to be told of iman and Muhammad replies:

That you affirm your faith in Allah, in His angels, in His Books, in His Apostles, in the Day of Judgment, and you affirm your faith in the Divine Decree about good and evil.

Another similar narration ascribed to Muhammad is:

Ibn Abbas narrates that the Angel Jibril once asked the Prophet: "Tell me what is Islam?" The Prophet replied: "Iman is to believe in Allah, the Day of Judgment, His (Allah's) Angels, Books and Prophets and to believe in life after death; and to believe in Paradise and the Fire, and the setting up of the Mizan (scales) to weigh the deeds; and to believe in the Divine Decree, the good and the bad of it (all). Jibril then asked him: "If I do all this will I be with Iman?" The Prophet said: "When you have done all of this, you will have Iman."

== Delineation in the Qur'an and hadith ==
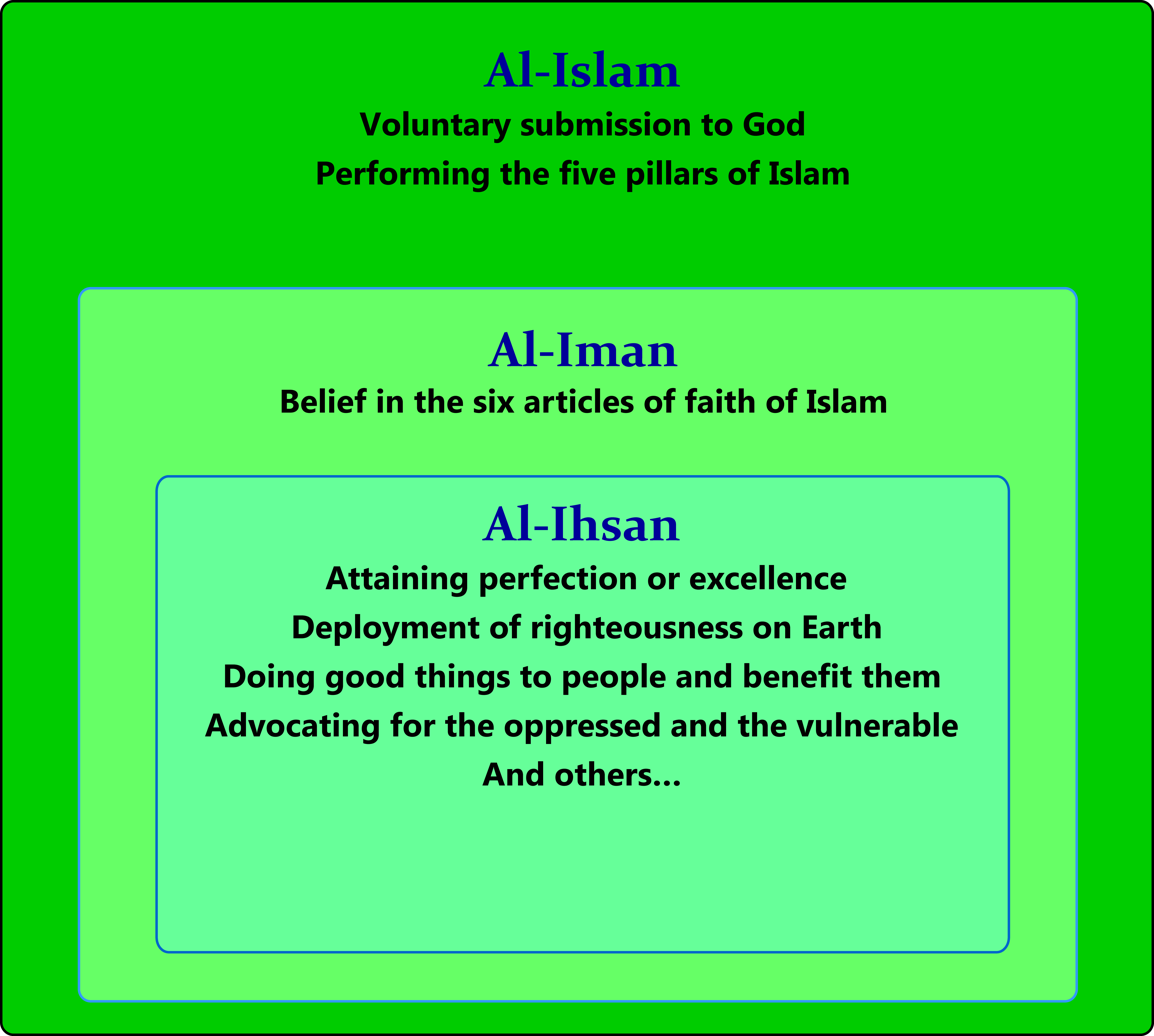
The three dimensions of Islam including iman.

In the Qur'an, iman is one of the 10 qualities which cause one to be the recipient of God's mercy and reward. The Qur'an states that faith can grow with the remembrance of God. The Qur'an also states that nothing in this world should be dearer to a true believer than faith.

Al-‘Abbas reported: The Messenger of Allah, peace and blessings be upon him, said, “He has tasted the sweetness of faith who is content with Allah as a Lord, Islam as a religion, and Muhammad as a messenger.” (Source: Ṣaḥīḥ Muslim 34) He also said that no one can be a true believer unless he loves Muhammad more than his children, parents and relatives. At another instance, he remarked that it is this love with Allah and Muhammad after which a person can be aware of the real taste of faith.

Amin Ahsan Islahi, a notable exegete of the Qur'an has clarified the nature of this love:

[I]t does not merely imply the passionate love one naturally has for one's wife, children, and other relatives, but it also refers to the love based on intellect and principles for some viewpoints and stances. It is because of this love that a person, in every sphere of life, gives priority to this viewpoint and direction... So much so, if the demands of his wife, children and relatives clash with the demands of this viewpoint, he adheres to it and without any hesitation turns down the desires of his wife and children and the demands of his family and clan.

Islahi and Abul A'la Maududi both have inferred that the Quranic comparison of a good word and a bad word in chapter 14 is a comparison of faith and disbelief. Thus, the Quran is effectively comparing faith to a tree whose roots are deep in the soil and branches spread in the vastness of the sky.

Iman is also the subject of a supplication uttered by Muhammad to God:

O God! I have resigned myself to You and I have consigned my matter to you and have taken support from You fearing Your grandeur and moving towards You in anticipation. There is no refuge and shelter after running away from You, and if there is, it is with You. Lord! I have professed faith in your Book which You have revealed and have professed faith in the Prophet you have sent as a Messenger.

=== The Seventy-Seven Branches of Faith ===
"The Seventy-Seven Branches of Faith" is a collection compiled by the Shafi'i imam al-Bayhaqi in his work Shu'ab al-Iman. In it, he explains the essential virtues that reflect true iman (faith and recognition) through related Quranic verses and prophetic sayings.

This is based on the following Hadith ascribed to Muhammad:

Abu Hurayrah narrated that the Prophet said: "Iman has more than 70 branches. The most excellent among these branches is the saying "Laa ilaaha ill Allah" (there is no God but Allah), and the smallest branch is to remove an obstacle from the wayside. And "Haya" (modesty) is an important branch of Iman."

These 77 branches described by Bayhaqi are:

Thirty actions connected with the heart:

1. Belief in Allah (Testimony of Acknowledgment: La ilaha illallah' (there is no true god but Allah)
2. Acknowledging that first, nothing but Allah existed; then, Allah created everything which subsequently came into existence
3. Acknowledging the existence of angels (malaikah).
4. Acknowledging that all the sacred books (qutub) sent down to the various Prophets are true. However, all books other than the Quran are no longer valid.
5. Acknowledging that all prophets are true. However, Muslims are commanded to follow only the Islamic prophet, Muhammad
6. Believing that Allah already knows everything and that whatever he permits or wills will happen.
7. Believing that the Doomsday will happen.
8. Acknowledging the existence of Jannat (Paradise).
9. Acknowledging the existence of Hell
10. Having a love for Allah.
11. Acknowledging Muhammad's love for Allah
12. To love or hate someone only for the sake of Allah.
13. Performing all good deeds with sincerity (purpose of deen; only to please Allah).
14. To repent and show remorse when a sin is committed.
15. To fear Allah.
16. Hoping for God's mercy.
17. Being humble.
18. Expressing gratitude (shukr) for favour or favour.
19. Fulfilling promises.
20. Having patience (sabar).
21. Feeling inferior to others.
22. Be kind to God's creations.
23. To be satisfied with whatever prescribed orders come from Allah
24. Trusting in Allah.
25. Not to boast or brag about any quality one possesses
26. Not to hate or hate anyone.
27. Not to be jealous of anyone.
28. Not to get angry.
29. Not to wish anyone harm.
30. To have no love for the world.

The seven works attached to the tongue:

1. Reciting the Kalema with the tongue.
2. Reciting the Quran.
3. Gaining knowledge.
4. Giving knowledge
5. Making dua.
6. Zikr of Allah.
7. Abstaining from the following: lying, backbiting (blasphemy in one's absence), obscenity, cursing, and singing (obscene) songs that are against Shariah.

Forty works are attached to the whole body:

1. Performing ablution, bathing and keeping clothes clean.
2. To be steadfast in prayer.
3. Paying zakat and sadaqatul fitr.
4. Fasting.
5. Performing Hajj.
6. To perform itikaaf.
7. Moving away or emigrating from a place harmful to religion
8. To fulfil the promise made to Allah.
9. Fulfilling vows that are not sins.
10. Paying expiation for unfulfilled vows.
11. To cover the body.
12. Sacrificing for Allah
13. The shrouding and burial of the deceased.
14. Paying off one's debts
15. Abstaining from prohibited things while doing financial transactions.
16. Not to hide the truth while testifying.
17. Marry when nafs wants to marry.
18. Allowing those under oneself to fulfil their rights
19. Providing comfort to parents.
20. Bringing up children in the right way.
21. Not cutting ties with friends or relatives.
22. Obeying one's boss
23. To be fair and righteous
24. Not to initiate any path contrary to the generality of Muslims.
25. To obey the ruler, if what they command is not contrary to the Shariah.
26. Making peace between two warring factions or individuals.
27. Enjoining good and forbidding wrong (Amr bil ma'ruf want nahi anil munkar).
1. Struggling against the enemies of religion (if possible with the hand, if not with the tongue (by the pen), if not with the heart).
2. Giving loans to those in need
3. Seeing to the needs of one's neighbours.
4. Ensuring halal and purity of income earning.
5. Expenditure according to Shariah.
6. Replying to whoever greets oneself
7. Yarhamukallah when someone says Alhamdulillah after sneezing.
8. Not harming anyone unfairly.
9. Abstaining from sports and pastimes that are against Shariah.
10. Removal of gravel, stones, thorns, sticks etc. from the road.

== Faith and deeds ==
In Islam, there must exist harmony and concord between faith and deeds. Farāhī has explained this aspect in his tafsīr in the following manner:

Righteous deeds are mentioned in the Qurān right after faith in the capacity of an explanation [...] In the case of faith, the need for its explanation is obvious: the place of faith is the heart and the intellect. In matters of intellect and heart, not only can a person deceive others but also at times he can remain in deception. He considers himself to be a mu'min (believer) whereas actually, he is not. For this reason, two testimonies needed to be required for it: a person's words and a person's deeds. Since words can be untrue, hence a person who only professes faith through words is not regarded as a mu'min and it was deemed essential that a person's deeds also testify to his faith.

== Faith and reason in Islam ==
The relationship between reason and faith in Islam is a complex debate spanning centuries. Ismail Raji al-Faruqi states on this subject:

As for the non-Muslims, they may contest the principles of Islam. They must know, however, that Islam does not present its principles dogmatically, for those who believe or wish to believe, exclusively. It does so rationally, and critically. It comes to us armed with logical and coherent arguments, and expects our acquiescence on rational, and hence necessary, grounds. It is not legitimate for us to disagree on the relativist basis of personal taste, or that of subjective experience.

== In Shia Islam ==
In Shia Islam (Twelver Shi'ism, the largest branch of Shi'a Islam), Faith (or in its Arabic form: Iman) is a sincere belief in God and His oneness, the prophethood, and the teachings of Muhammad, as well as the Twelve Infallible Imams. Shia jurists regard faith as an essential qualification for religious leaders, congregational leaders, judges, and Zakat collectors. Most Shia scholars assert that faith cannot merely be a form of imitation.

Shiite theologians regard belief in the Imamate of the infallible Imams following Muhammad, as a fundamental prerequisite for faith, alongside belief in monotheism, the prophethood of Muhammad, divine justice, and resurrection. According to the teachings of the Quran, faith is distinct from Islam and exists at a higher level. Furthermore, faith can fluctuate, increasing or decreasing over time, and no one can be compelled to believe.

In the creed included in his Al-Amali, al-Saduq defines Islam through affirmation of the two testimonies of faith, and iman through verbal affirmation, inward assent and deeds.

Many Shia scholars assert that Islam encompasses more than mere faith; thus, every believer is regarded as a Muslim, yet not every Muslim is necessarily a true believer. Some Shia scholars, including Nasir al-Din al-Tusi and Zayn al-Din al-Juba'i al'Amili, contend that faith and authentic Islam are synonymous, while the outward practice of Islam exists at a lower level than genuine faith.

In Islam, faith is grounded in knowledge and understanding. Conversely, faith is also rooted in reason, and both are divine gifts that reinforce one another. Furthermore, from an Islamic perspective, there is a strong connection between faith and action; action serves as the outward manifestation of faith. If action is absent, it is evident that faith has not taken root in the heart.

=== Conceptology ===
In Shiite traditions and jurisprudential works, the term "Iman (faith)" is understood in both general and specific contexts. The general meaning refers to a heartfelt belief in all the teachings of Muhammad. In contrast, the specific meaning encompasses this general belief while also including the conviction in the imamate and guardianship of the Twelve Imams. According to this specific understanding of faith, all Twelver Shiites are regarded as believers.

Faith, in a specific context, plays a crucial role in various areas of Islamic jurisprudence, including Ijtihad, Taqlid, Ritual purification, Prayer, Zakat, Khums, Fasting, Iʿtikāf, Hajj, Waqf, Nazr, Judgment, and Testify. It is regarded as a prerequisite for the validity and acceptance of all acts of worship. Furthermore, faith is essential for the authority of Taqlid, the imam of the congregation, those entitled to Zakat and Khums, judges, witnesses, and the distributors of wealth appointed by the ruler of Sharia. Additionally, many Islamic jurists have specified that faith is also a requirement for the Muezzin of the congregation and the deputy during Hajj pilgrimage.

Al-Shaykh al-Mufid, a prominent scholar of the Imamiyyah tradition, defined faith as a heartfelt affirmation, verbal confession, and the practice of obedience of God. Similarly, Al-Shafi'i, a notable Sunni scholar, shares this perspective. Several Imamiyyah scholars, including Sharif al-Murtaza, Shaykh Tusi, al-Bahrani, Fazel Miqdad, and Abd al-Razzaq Lahiji, assert that faith is fundamentally an act of the heart. Thus, faith equates to a sincere belief in God, the prophethood of Muhammad, and the divine revelation. According to this view, a believer is someone who holds this conviction in their heart, and verbal confession is not deemed necessary.

== Imitative faith ==
Prominent Imamiyyah scholars assert that mere imitation is insufficient for genuine faith. The Mu'tazilites and the majority of Ash'arites concur with the Shiite perspective on this matter. In contrast, Sunni, Hashwiyyah and Ta'limiyyah, regard faith based on imitation as valid.

== See also ==
- Aqidah
- Five Pillars of Islam
- Al-Ikhlas
- Taqwa
- Six Kalimas
- Amin and Amina, names derivant of Iman
- Glossary of Islam
- Hadith terminology
- Abd (Arabic)
- Ahl al-Fatrah
- Ahl al-Hadith
- Al-Ism al-A'zam
- Al-Jānn
- Al-Nafs al-Zakiyyah
- Du'a al-Sabah
- Du'a' Kumayl
- Dua Simat
- Ehya night
