= Jawshan Kabir =

Islamic supplication usually recited during the holy Nights of Qadr

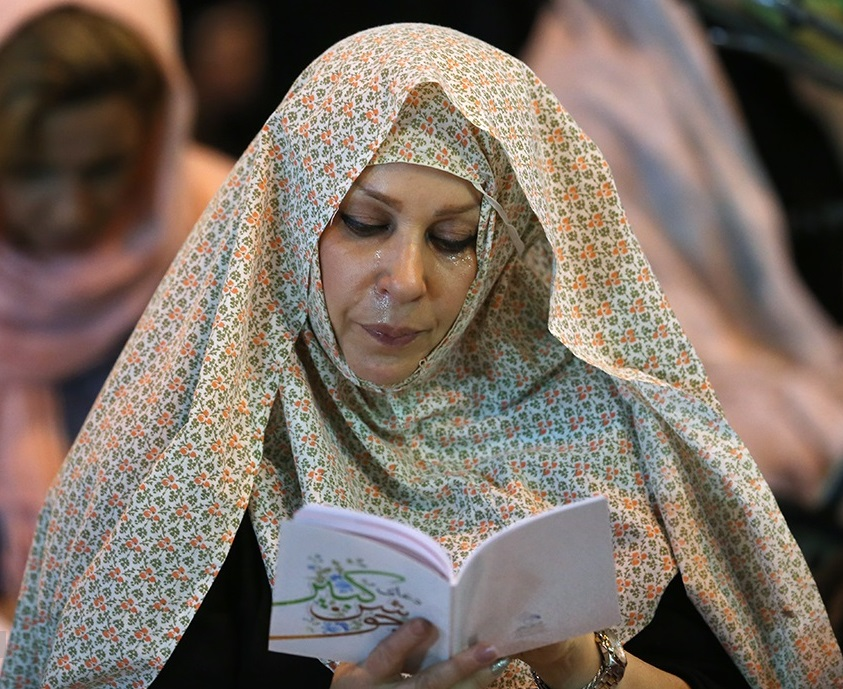
An Iranian woman reading Jawshan Kabir

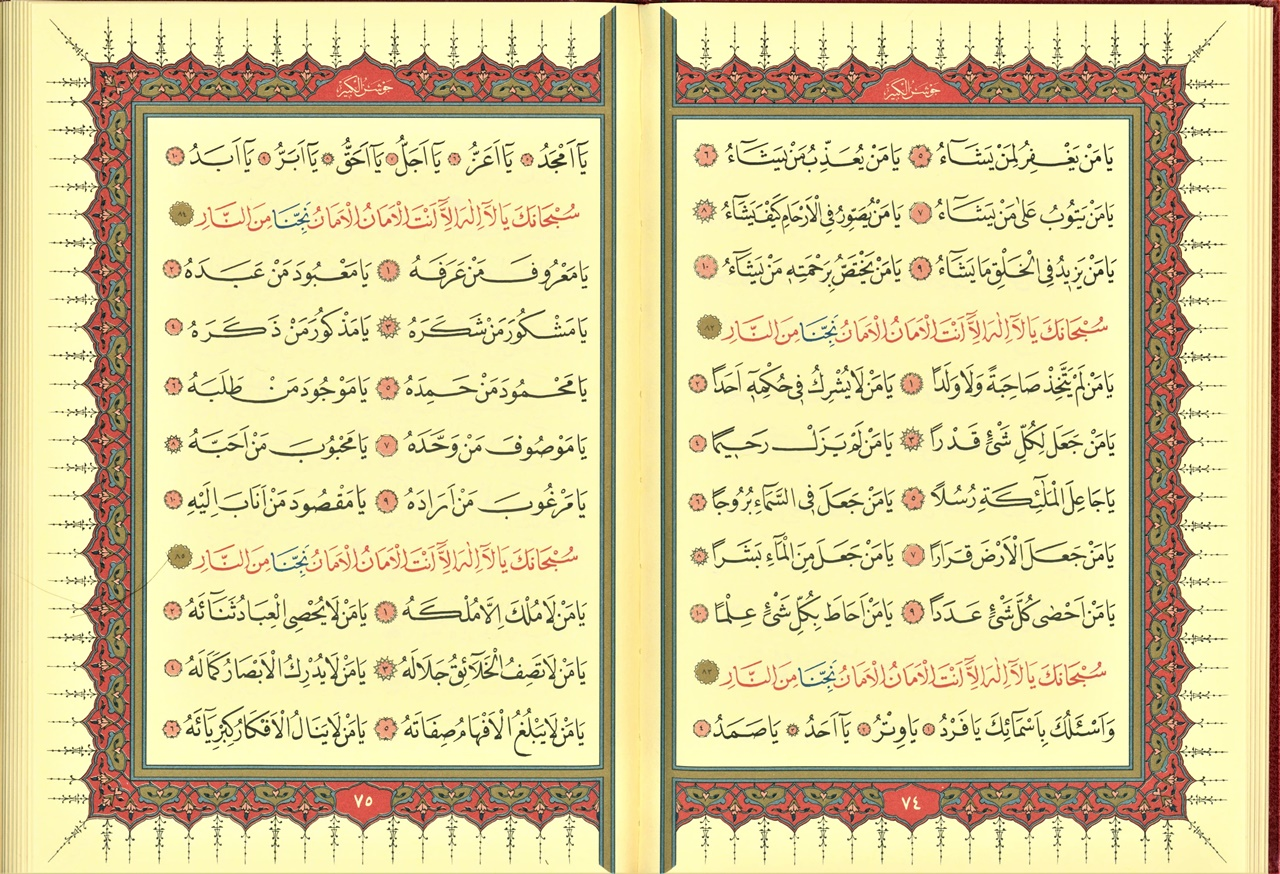
Jawshan Al-Kabir inside the Book "Hizb-ü Envari'l hakaiki'n-Nuriye" by Said Nursi, the most used version of Jawshan al kabir among Sunni Muslims in Turkey

The Jawshan Kabeer (Arabic: الجَوْشَن ٱلْكَبِير, romanized: Jawšan Kabīr, lit. 'Great Cuirass') is a long Islamic prayer that contains 1001 names and attributes of God in Islam, and is widely used in many Twelver Shi'i Muslim traditions, and also in some Sunni Muslim tradition especially in Turkey. Jawshan means "steel plate" or "mail" and thus the name of the prayer refers to Muhammad's heavy armor in battle. According to Shia Muslims, God taught the prayer to him as a protection from injuries in war, instead of hard armor.

== History ==
The Islamic prophet Muhammad wore heavy armor when fighting. Because of the tightness of his armor, his body was injured. According to Shi'i Muslims, during the war, the angel Gabriel came and brought him a message from God, teaching prayer to Muhammad to protect him from bad events. Jibra'il said: "O’ Muhammad! Your God conveys his salutations to you and has said to take this coat of armor and to recite it as this is a protection for you and your Ummah." The prayer became his armor to protect him against injuries. The name of the prayer was taken from Muhammad's heavy armor in the battle.

== Text ==
The context of the prayer was described by Ali al-Sajjad, the fourth Twelver Imam, and came to him from his great grandfather Muhammad by word of mouth. Afterwards, a Twelver narrator and faqih, Ibrahim ibn Ali A’meli Kafa’mi, mentioned the Jawshan Kabir in his book Balad al-Amin.

The Jawshan Kabir prayer contains 100 parts. Twenty-five of these parts start with, "I entreat You by Your Name". Names of God are recited after the phrase. The supplication comprises 250 names and 750 attributes of God and a request from God. For this reason, the Jawshan Kabir prayer is known as Ism-e-A’ẓam "the greatest name (of God)". The exact phrase is repeated at the end of each part: "Praise be to Thee, there is no God but Thee, The Granter of all Succor (Mercy!, Mercy!), Protect us from the Fire, O Lord."

=== List of mentioned names and attributes of Allah ===
Names 1 to 100
No.	Arabic	Transliteration	English translation
1	الله	Allāh	The God
2	رَحْمَنُ	Raḥmān	Gracious
3	رَحِيمُ	Raḥīm	Merciful
4	كَرِيمُ	Karīm	Most Generous
5	مُقِيمُ	Muqīm	Self-Subsisting
6	عَظِيمُ	ʿAẓīm	Greatest
7	قَدِيمُ	Qadīm	Eternal
8	عَلِيمُ	ʿAlīm	All-Knowing
9	حَلِيمُ	Ḥalīm	Forbearing
10	حَكِيمُ	Ḥakīm	Wise
11	سَيِّدَ السَّادَاتِ	Sayyidaʼs-Sādāt	Master of Masters
12	مُجِيبَ الدَّعَوَاتِ	Mujībaʼd-Daʿawāt	Acceptor of Prayers
13	رَافِعَ الدَّرَجَاتِ	Rāfiʿaʼd-Darajāt	Elevator of Rank
14	وَلِيَّ الْحَسَنَاتِ	Waliyyaʼl-Ḥasanāt	Guardian of Good Deeds
15	غَافِرَ الْخَطِيئَاتِ	Ghāfiraʼl-Khaṭīʾāt	Forgiver of Evil Deeds
16	مُعْطِيَ الْمَسْأَلاتِ	Muʿṭiyaʼl-Masʾalāt	Granter of Requests
17	قَابِلَ التَّوْبَاتِ	Qābilaʼt-Tawbāt	Acceptor of Repentance
18	سَامِعَ الأَصْوَاتِ	Sāmiʿaʼl-ʾAṣwāt	Hearer of Voices
19	عَالِمَ الْخَفِيَّاتِ	ʿĀlimaʼl-Khafiyyāt	Knower of Attributes
20	دَافِعَ الْبَلِيَّاتِ	Dāfiʿaʼl-Baliyyāt	Repeller of Calamities
21	خَيْرَ الْغافِرِينَ	Khayraʼl-Ghāfirīn	Best of Forgivers
22	خَيْرَ الْفَاتِحِينَ	Khayraʼl-Fātiḥīn	Best of Deciders
23	خَيْرَ النَّاصِرِينَ	Khayraʼn-Nāṣirīn	Best of Helpers
24	خَيْرَ الْحَاكِمِينَ	Khayraʼl-Ḥākimīn	Best of Judges
25	خَيْرَ الرَّازِقِينَ	Khayraʼr-Rāziqīn	Best of Providers
26	خَيْرَ الْوَارِثِينَ	Khayraʼl-Wārithīn	Best of Inheritors
27	خَيْرَ الْحَامِدِينَ	Khayraʼl-Ḥāmidīn	Best of Praisers
28	خَيْرَ الذَّاكِرِينَ	Khayraʼḏ-Ḏākirīn	Best of Rememberers
29	خَيْرَ الْمُنْزِلِينَ	Khayraʼl-Munzilīn	Best of Dischargers
30	خَيْرَ الْمُحْسِنِينَ	Khayraʼl-Muḥsinīn	Best of Benefactors
31	مَن لَّهُ الْعِزَّةُ وَالْجَمَالُ	Man Llahuʼl-ʿIzzatu waʼl-Jamāl	He to Whom is All Glory and Virtue
32	مَن لَّهُ الْقُدْرَةُ وَالْكَمَالُ	Man Llahuʼl-Qudratu waʼl-Kamāl	He to Whom is All Might and Perfection
33	مَن لَّهُ الْمُلْكُ وَالجَلاَلُ	Man Llahuʼl-Mulku waʼl-Jalāl	He to Whom is All Dominion and Sublimity,
34	مَنْ هُوَ الْكَبِيرُ الْمُتَعَاِل	Man Huwaʼl-Kabīruʼl-Mutaʿāl	He Who is Great Above All
35	مُنْشِئَ السَّحَابِ الثِّقَاِل	Munshiʾaʼs-Saḥābiʼth-Thiqāl	Creator of Heavy Clouds
36	مَنْ هُوَ شَدِيدُ الْمِحَاِل	Man Huwa Shadīduʼl-Miḥāl	He Who is the Most Powerful
37	مَنْ هُوَ سَرِيعُ الْحِسَابِ	Man Huwa Sarīʿuʼl-Ḥisāb	He Who is Quick to Reckon
38	مَنْ هُوَ شَدِيدُ الْعِقَابِ	Man Huwa Shadīduʼl-ʿIqāb	He Who Gives the Severest Punishments
39	مَنْ عِنْدَهُ حُسْنُ الثَّوَابِ	Man ʿIndahu Ḥusnuʼth-Thawāb	He With Whom is the Excellent Reward
40	مَنْ عِنْدَهُ أُمُّ الْكِتَابِ	Man ʿIndahu ʾUmmuʼl-Kitāb	He With Whom is the Original Book
41	حَنَّانُ	Ḥannān	Compassionate
42	مَنَّانُ	Mannān	Benefactor
43	دَيَّانُ	Dayyān	Judge
44	بُرْهَانُ	Burhān	Proof
45	سُلْطَانُ	Sulṭān	Sovereign
46	رِضْوَانُ	Riḍwān	Approver
47	غُفْرَانُ	Ghufrān	Forgiver
48	سُبْحَانُ	Subḥān	Exalted
49	مُسْتَعَانُ	Mustaʿān	Helper
50	ذَا الْمَنِّ وَالْبَيَانِ	Ḏāʼl-Manni waʼl-Bayān	Holder of Blessings and Manifestation
51	مَن تَوَاضَعَ كُلُّ شَيٍْء لِّعَظَمَتِهِ	Man Tawāḍaʿa Kullu Shayʾin; Lliʿaẓamatih	He Before Whose Greatness Everything Bows
52	مَنِ اسْتَسْلَمَ کُلُّ شَيٍْء لِّقُدْرَتِهِ	Maniʼstaslama Kullu Shayʾin; Lliqudratih	He Before Whose Power Everything Submits
53	مَن ذَلَّ كُلُّ شَيٍْء لِّعِزَّتِهِ	Man Ḏalla Kullu Shayʾin Lliʿizzatih	He Before Whose Might Overshadows Everything
54	مَنْ خَضَعَ كُلُّ شَيٍْء لِّهَيْبَتِهِ	Man Khaḍaʿa Kullu Shayʾin; Llihaybatih	He Before Whose Prestige Everything is Humbled
55	مَنِ انْقَادَ کُلُّ شَیْءٍ مِنْ خَشْیَتِهِ	Maniʼnqāda Kullu Shayʾin; Min Khashyatih	He Before Whose Fearsomeness Everything Yields
56	مَن تَشَقَّقَتِ الْجِبَالُ مِن مَّخَافَتِهِ	Man Tashaqqaqatiʼl-Jibālu Min; Makhāfatih	He Before Whose Terribleness Mountains Shake
57	مَن قَامَتِ السَّمَاوَاتُ بِأَمْرِهِ	Man Qāmatiʼs-Samāwātu; Biʾamrih	He Before Whose Command the Heavens Are Raised
58	مَنِ اسْتَقَرَّتِ الْاَرَضُونَ بِاِذْنِهِ	Maniʼstaqarratiʼl-ʾAraḍūna; Biʾiḏnih	He Through Whose Permission in the Earths Are Secured
59	مَن يُّسَبِّحُ الرَّعْدُ بِحَمْدِهِ	Man Yusabbiḥuʼr-Raʿdu Biḥamdih	He Whose Glory the Thunder Proclaims
60	مَن لا يَعْتَدِي عَلَى أَهْلِ مَمْلَكَتِهِ	Man La Yaʿtadī ʿalā ʾAhli; Mamlakatih	He Who Is Never Cruel to His Subjects
61	غَافِرَ الْخَطَايَا	Ghāfiraʼl-Khaṭāyā	Forgiver of Sins
62	كَاشِفَ الْبَلاَيَا	Kāshifaʼl-Balāyā	Dispeller of Tribulations
63	مُنْتَهَى الرَّجَايَا	Muntahāʼr-Rajāyā	Aim of Hopes
64	مُجْزِلَ الْعَطَايَا	Mujzilaʼl-ʿAṭāyā	Giver of Gifts
65	وَاهِبَ الْهَدَايَا	Wāhibaʼl-Hadāyā	Bestower of Bounties
66	رَازِقَ الْبَرَايَا	Rāziqaʼl-Barāyā	Provider of Creatures
67	قَاضِي الْمَنَايَا	Qāḍiyaʼl-Manāyā	Judge of Destinies
68	سَامِعَ الشَّكَايَا	Sāmiʿaʼsh-Shakāyā	Hearer of Complaints
69	بَاعِثَ الْبَرَايَا	Bāʿithaʼl-Barāyā	Resurrector of Creatures
70	مُطْلِقَ الأُسَارَى	Muṭliqaʼl-ʾUsārā	Freer of Captives
71	ذَا الْحَمْدِ وَالثَّنَاءِ	Ḏāʼl-Ḥamdi waʼth-Thanāʾ	He to Whom Is All Praise and Adoration
72	ذَا الْفَخْرِ وَالْبَهَاءِ	Ḏāʼl-Fakhri waʼl-Bahāʾ	He Who Holds All Pride and Eminence
73	ذَا الْمَجْدِ وَالسَّنَاءِ	Ḏāʼl-Majdi waʼs-Sanāʾ	He Who Holds All Honor and Rank
74	ذَا الْعَهْدِ وَالْوَفَاءِ	Ḏāʼl-ʿAhdi waʼl-Wafāʾ	He Who Makes Promises and Honors Them
75	ذَا الْعَفْوِ وَالرِّضَاءِ	Ḏāʼl-ʿAfwi waʼr-Riḍāʾ	He Who Pardons and Is Content
76	ذَا الْمَنِّ وَالْعَطَاءِ	Ḏāʼl-Manni waʼl-ʿAṭāʾ	He Who Holds All Abundance and Provides
77	ذَا الْفَصْلِ وَالْقَضَاءِ	Ḏāʼl-Faṣli waʼl-Qaḍāʾ	He Who Holds Decision and Judgement
78	ذَا الْعِزِّ وَالْبَقَاءِ	Ḏāʼl-ʿIzzi waʼl-Baqāʾ	He Who Is Glorious and Eternal
79	ذَا الْجُودِ وَالسَّخَاءِ	Ḏāʼl-ʿJūdi waʼs-Sakhāʾ	He Who Is Liberal and Munificent
80	ذَا الآلاءِ وَالنَّعْمَاءِ	Ḏāʼl-ʿĀlāʾi waʼn-Naʿmāʾ	He Who Holds All Blessings and Bounties
81	مَانِعُ	Māniʿ	Defender
82	دَافِعُ	Dāfiʿ	Repeller
83	رَافِعُ	Rāfiʿ	Upgrader
84	صَانِعُ	Ṣāniʿ	Fashioner
85	نَافِعُ	Nāfiʿ	Propitious
86	سَامِعُ	Sāmiʿ	Hearer
87	جَامِعُ	Jāmiʿ	Gatherer
88	شَافِعُ	Shāfiʿ	Intercessor
89	وَاسِعُ	Wāsiʿ	Magnanimous
90	مُوسِعُ	Mūsiʿ	Increaser
91	صَانِعَ کُلِّ مَصْنُوعٍ	Ṣāniʿa Kulli Maṣnūʿ	Fashioner of Every Fashioned Thing
92	خَالِقَ کُلِّ مَخْلُوقٍ	Khāliqa Kulli Makhlūq	Creator of Every Created Thing
93	رَازِقَ کُلِّ مَرْزُوقٍ	Rāziqa Kulli Marzūq	Provider for Every Needy Thing
94	مَاِلكَ كُلِّ مَمْلُوكٍ	Mālika Kulli Mamlūk	Sovereign Over All Subjects
95	كَاشِفَ كُلِّ مَكْرُوبٍ	Kāshifa Kulli Makrūb	Dispeller of Every Hardship
96	فَاِرجَ كُلِّ مَهْمُومٍ	Fārija Kulli Mahmūm	Comforter of Every Griever
97	رَاحِمَ كُلِّ مَرْحُومٍ	Rāḥima Kulli Marḥūm	Merciful to Every Sufferer
98	نَاصِرَ كُلِّ مَخْذُولٍ	Nāṣira Kulli Makhḏūl	Helper of Every Forsaken Thing
99	سَاتِرَ كُلِّ مَعْيُوبٍ	Sātira Kulli Maʿyūb	Concealer of Every Blemished Thing
100	مَلْجَأَ كُلِّ مَطْرُودٍ	Maljaʾa Kulli Maṭrūd	Shelter for Every Exile

Names 101 to 200
No.	Arabic	Transliteration	English translation
101	عُدَّتِي عِنْدَ شِدَّتِي	ʿUddatī ʿinda Shiddatī	Provider in My Hardship
102	رَجَائِي عِنْدَ مُصِيبَتِي	Rajāʾī ʿinda Muṣībatī	Hope in My Misfortune
103	مُؤْنِسِي عِنْدَ وَحْشَتِي	Muʾnisī ʿinda Waḥshatī	Companion in My Isolation
104	صَاحِبِي عِنْدَ غُرْبَتِي	Ṣāḥibī ʿinda Ghurbatī	Companion in My Journey
105	وَلِيِّي عِنْدَ نِعْمَتِي	Waliyyī ʿinda Niʿmatī	Friend in My Ease
106	غِيَاثِي عِنْدَ كُرْبَتِي	Ghiyāthī ʿinda Kurbatī	Rescuer From My Trials
107	دَلِيلِي عِنْدَ حَيْرَتِي	Dalīlī ʿinda Ḥayratī	Guide in My Perplexity
108	غِنَائِي عِنْدَ افْتِقَارِي	Ghināʾī ʿindaʼftiqārī	Resource in My Neediness
109	مَلْجَئِي عِنْدَ اضْطِرَارِي	Maljaʾī ʿindaʼḍṭirārī	Shelter in My Helplessness
110	مُعِينِي عِنْدَ مَفْزَعِي	Muʿīnī ʿinda Mafzaʿī	Deliverer From My Fears
111	عَلاَّمَ الْغُيُوبِ	ʿAllāmaʼl-Ghuyūb	Knower of the Unseen
112	غَفَّارَ الذُّنُوبِ	Ghaffāraʼḏ-Ḏunūb	Forgiver of Wrongdoings
113	سَتَّارَ الْعُيُوبِ	Sattāraʼl-ʿUyūb	Concealer of Defects
114	كَاشِفَ الْكُرُوبِ	Kāshifaʼl-Kurūb	Expeller of Pain
115	مُقَلِّبَ الْقُلُوبِ	Muqallibaʼl-Qulūb	Changer of the Hearts
116	طَبِيبَ الْقُلُوبِ	Ṭabībaʼl-Qulūb	Physician of the Hearts
117	مُنَوِّرَ الْقُلُوبِ	Munawwiraʼl-Qulūb	Illuminator of the Hearts
118	أَنِيسَ الْقُلُوبِ	ʾAnīsaʼl-Qulūb	Intimate of the Hearts
119	مُفَرِّجَ الْهُمُومِ	Mufarrijaʼl-Humūm	Eliminator of Anxiety
120	مُنَفِّسَ الْغُمُومِ	Munaffisaʼl-Ghumūm	Liberator From Grief
121	جَلِيلُ	Jalīl	Glorious
122	جَمِيلُ	Jamīl	Virtuous
123	وَكِيلُ	Wakīl	Protector
124	كَفِيلُ	Kafīl	Patron
125	دَلِيلُ	Dalīl	Guide
126	قَبِيلُ	Qabīl	Guarantor
127	مُدِيلُ	Mudīl	Bestower of Wealth
128	مُنِيلُ	Munīl	Bestower of Blessings
129	مُقِيلُ	Muqīl	Bestower of Strength
130	مُحِيلُ	Muḥīl	Acceptor of Repentance
131	دَلِيلَ الْمُتَحَيِّرِينَ	Dalīlaʼl-Mutaḥayyirīn	Guide of the Waylaid
132	غِيَاثَ الْمُسْتَغِيثِينَ	Ghiyāthaʼl-Mustaghīthīn	Rescuer of Those Who Appeal
133	صَرِيخَ الْمُسْتَصْرِخِينَ	Ṣarīkhaʼl-Mustaṣrikhīn	Helper of Those Who Call
134	جَارَ الْمُسْتَجِيرِينَ	Jāraʼl-Mustajīrīn	Aider of Those Who Call
135	أَمَانَ الْخَائِفِينَ	ʾAmānaʼl-Khāʾifīn	Shelter of the Fearful
136	عَوْنَ الْمُؤْمِنِينَ	ʿAwnaʼl-Muʾminīn	Succourer of the Faithful
137	رَاحِمَ الْمَسَاكِينَ	Rāḥimaʼl-Masākīn	Merciful to the Indigent
138	مَلْجَأَ الْعَاصِينَ	Maljaʾaʼl-ʿĀṣīn	Refuge for the Disobedient
139	غَافِرَ الْمُذْنِبِينَ	Ghāfiraʼl-Muḏnibīn	Forgiver of Those Who Sin
140	مُجِيبَ دَعْوَةِ الْمُضْطَرِّينَ	Mujība Daʿwatiʼl-Muḍṭarrīn	Responder to the Calls of Those in Need
141	ذَا الْجُودِ وَالإِحْسَانِ	Ḏāʼl-Jūdi waʼl-ʾIḥsān	Master of Liberality and Beneficence
142	ذَا الْفَضْلِ وَالإمْتِنَانِ	Ḏāʼl-Faḍli waʼl-ʾImtinān	He Who Is Gracious and Obliging
143	ذَا الأَمْنِ وَالأَمَانِ	Ḏāʼl-ʾAmni waʼl-ʾAmān	Master of Peace and Security
144	ذَا الْقُدْسِ وَالسُّبْحَانِ	Ḏāʼl-Qudsi waʼs-Subḥān	He Who Is Holy and Exalted
145	ذَا الْحِكْمَةِ وَالْبَيَانِ	Ḏāʼl-Ḥikmati waʼl-Bayān	Master of Wisdom and Manifestation
146	ذَا الرَّحْمَةِ وَالرِّضْوَانِ	Ḏāʼr-Raḥmati waʼr-Riḍwān	Master of Mercy and Satisfaction
147	ذَا الْحُجَّةِ وَالْبُرْهَانِ	Ḏāʼl-Ḥujjati waʼl-Burhān	Master of Argument and Proof
148	ذَا الْعَظَمَةِ وَالسُّلْطَانِ	Ḏāʼl-ʿAẓamati waʼs-Sulṭān	Master of Grandeur and Sovereignty
149	ذَا الرَّأْفَةِ وَالْمُسْتَعَانِ	Ḏāʼr-Raʾfati waʼl-Mustaʿān	Master of Kindness and Aid
150	ذَا الْعَفْوِ وَالْغُفْرَانِ	Ḏāʼl-ʿAfwi waʼl-Ghufrān	Master of Pardon and Forgiveness
151	مَنْ هُوَ رَبُّ كُلِّ شَيٍْء	Man Huwa Rabbu Kulli Shayʾ	He Who Is the Lord Over All Things
152	مَنْ هُوَ إِلَهُ كُلِّ شَيٍْء	Man Huwa ʾIlāhu Kulli Shayʾ	He Who Is the God of All Things
153	مَنْ هُوَ خَاِلقُ كُلِّ شَيٍْء	Man Huwa Khāliqu Kulli Shayʾ	He Who Is the Creator of All Things
154	مَنْ هُوَ صَانِعُ كُلِّ شَيٍْء	Man Huwa Ṣāniʿu Kulli Shayʾ	He Who Is the Fashioner of All Things
155	مَنْ هُوَ قَبْلَ كُلِّ شَيٍْء	Man Huwa Qabla Kulli Shayʾ	He Who Is the Predecessor of All Things
156	مَنْ هُوَ بَعْدَ كُلِّ شَيٍْء	Man Huwa Baʿda Kulli Shayʾ	He Who Is the Successor of All Things
157	مَنْ هُوَ فَوْقَ كُلِّ شَيٍْء	Man Huwa Fawqa Kulli Shayʾ	He Who Is Above All Things
158	مَنْ هُوَ عَاِلمٌ بِكُلِّ شَيٍْء	Man Huwa ʿĀlimun Bikulli Shayʾ	He Who Is Knowledged on All Things
159	مَنْ هُوَ قَادِرٌ عَلَى كُلِّ شَيٍْء	Man Huwa Qādirun ʿalā Kulli Shayʾ	He Who Is Powerful Over All Things
160	مَنْ هُوَ يَبْقَى وَيَفْنَى كُلُّ شَيٍْء	Man Huwa Yabqā wa Yafnā Kullu; Shayʾ	He Who Is the Sustainer and Extinguisher of All Things
161	مُؤْمِنُ	Muʾmin	Securer
162	مُهَيْمِنُ	Muhaymin	Protector
163	مُكَوِّنُ	Mukawwin	Bestower of Being
164	مُلَقِّنُ	Mulaqqin	Bestower of Knowledge
165	مُبَيِّنُ	Mubayyin	Manifester
166	مُهَوِّنُ	Muhawwin	Facilitator
167	مُمَكِّنُ	Mumakkin	Provider of Place
168	مُزَيِّنُ	Muzayyin	Adorner
169	مُعْلِنُ	Muʿlin	Proclaimer
170	مُقْسِّمُ	Muqsim	Distributor
171	مَنْ هُوَ فِي مُلْكِهِ مُقِيمٌ	Man Huwa fī Mulkihi Muqīm	He Who Is Everlasting in His Kingdom
172	مَنْ هُوَ فِي سُلْطَانِهِ قَدِيمٌ	Man Huwa fī Sulṭānihi Qadīm	He Who Is Eternal in His Sovereignty
173	مَنْ هُوَ فِي جَلاَلِهِ عَظِيمٌ	Man Huwa fī Jalālihi ʿAẓīm	He Who Is Greatest in His Grandeur
174	مَنْ هُوَ عَلَى عِبَادِهِ رَحِيمٌ	Man Huwa ʿalā ʿIbādihi Raḥīm	He Who Is Merciful to His Servants
175	مَنْ هُوَ بِكُلِّ شَيٍْء عَلِيمٌ	Man Huwa Bikulli Shayʾin ʿAlīm	He Who Is Aware of Everything
176	مَنْ هُوَ بِمَنْ عَصَاهُ حَلِيمٌ	Man Huwa Biman ʿAṣāhu Ḥalīm	He Who Is Forbearing Towards the Disobedient
177	مَنْ هُوَ بِمَن رَّجَاهُ كَرِيمٌ	Man Huwa Biman Rrajāhu Karīm	He Who Is Generous to the Beseechers
178	مَنْ هُوَ فِي صُنْعِهِ حَكِيمٌ	Man Huwa fī Ṣunʿihi Ḥakīm	He Who Is Wise Over What He Has Fashioned
179	مَنْ هُوَ فِي حِكْمَتِهِ لَطِيفٌ	Man Huwa fī Ḥikmatihi Laṭīf	He Who Is Subtle in His Wisdom
180	مَنْ هُوَ فِي لُطْفِهِ قَدِيمٌ	Man Huwa fī Luṭfihi Qadīm	He Who Is Eternal in His Kindness
181	مَن لا يُرْجَى إِلاَّ فَضْلُهُ	Man Llā Yurjā ʾIllā Faḍluh	He From Whom Nothing Is Expected but His Favor
182	مَن لا يُسْأَلُ إِلاَّ عَفْوُهُ	Man Llā Yusʾalu ʾIllā ʿAfwuh	He From Whom Nothing Is Asked but His Pardon
183	مَن لا يُنْظَرُ إِلاَّ بِرُّهُ	Man Llā Yunẓaru ʾIllā Birruh	He From Whom Nothing Comes Out but His Goodness
184	مَن لا يُخَافُ إِلاَّ عَدْلُهُ	Man Llā Yukhāfu ʾIllā ʿAdluh	He Who Is Not Feared but for His Justice
185	مَن لا يَدُومُ إِلاَّ مُلْكُهُ	Man Llā Yadūmu ʾIllā Mulkuh	He Except Whose No Kingdom Is Eternal
186	مَن لا سُلْطَانَ إِلاَّ سُلْطَانُهُ	Man Llā Sulṭāna ʾIllā Sulṭānuh	He Except Whose No Sovereignty Is Prevailing
187	مَن وَّسِعَتْ كُلَّ شَيٍْء رَّحْمَتُهُ	Man Wwasiʿat Kulla Shayʾin; Rraḥmatuh	He Whose Mercy Encompasses Everything
188	مَنْ سَبَقَتْ رَحْمَتُهُ غَضَبَهُ	Man Sabaqat Raḥmatuhu; Ghaḍabah	He Whose Mercy Surpasses His Wrath
189	مَنْ أَحَاطَ بِكُلِّ شَيٍْء عِلْمُهُ	Man ʾAḥāṭa Bikulli Shayʾin ʿIlmuh	He Whose Knowledge Encompasses Everything
190	مَن لَّيْسَ أَحَدٌ مِّثْلَهُ	Man Llaysa ʾAḥadun Mithlah	He Who Has No Equal
191	فَارِجَ الْهَمِّ	Fārijaʼl-Ham	Remover of Anxiety
192	كَاشِفَ الْغَمِّ	Kāshifaʼl-Gham	Dispeller of Sorrow
193	غَافِرَ الذَّنْبِ	Ghāfiraʼḏ-Ḏanb	Forgiver of Wrongdoings
194	قَابِلَ التَّوْبِ	Qābilaʼt-Tawb	Acceptor of Repentance
195	خَاِلقَ الْخَلْقِ	Khāliqaʼl-Khalq	Creator of Creations
196	صَادِقَ الْوَعْدِ	Ṣādiqaʼl-Waʿd	Truthful in Promises
197	مُوفِي الْعَهْدِ	Mūfiyaʼl-ʿAhd	Accomplisher of Covenants
198	عَالِمَ السِّرِّ	ʿĀlimaʼs-Sir	Knower of Secrets
199	فَاِلقَ الْحَبِّ	Fāliqaʼl-Ḥab	Splitter of Seed
200	رَازِقَ الأَنَامِ	Rāziqaʼl-ʾAnām	Provider for Creatures

== Descriptions ==
Sunni and Shiite scholars have written commentaries on the prayer of Jowshan Kabir. The most famous commentary is the commentary of Mullah Hadi Sabzevari. This description is partly mystical and philosophical . Sabzevari has testified to Persian and Arabic poems based on prayer verses and has referred to Firoozabadi's dictionary of lexicon for lexical issues. He has also raised philosophical, mystical, and theological issues on a variety of occasions

== Recitation ==
Muslims often read the Jawshan kabir in Laylat al-Qadr in Ramadan but some Hadiths recommend reading it at the beginning of Ramadan. Imam Ali said to his son, Husayn ibn Ali, to memorize and write this supplication on his kafan (burial shroud). Also, there are several hadiths from the prophet Muhammad that state that whoever recites this prayer will receive rewards in the world and Akhirah. Abbas Qumi wrote the prayer in his book Mafatih al-Janan.

== Writing ==
According to the book of Urwath al-Wutha of Mohammed Kazem Yazdi, writing Dua Jawshan Kabir (as well as writing the whole of Quran and Du'a Jawshan Sagheer) on the shroud is deemed as a Mustahabb practice; it has also been mentioned through Husayn ibn Ali that it is permissible to write Jawshan Kabir and Jawshan Sagheer on the shroud, but, in order not to be Najis, it is better not to write on the parallel or lower of Awrah.

== See also ==
- Jawshan Sagheer
- Du'a Nudba
- Du'a al-Faraj
- Ramadan
- Du'a al-Baha
- Supplication of Abu Hamza al-Thumali
- Mujeer Du'a
- Dua Ahd
