= Six Articles =

Six Articles can refer to

- Six Articles (1539), an early Church of England doctrinal statement affirming traditional Roman Catholic teaching
- The six articles of Islamic faith
