= Muntahi al-Amal =

Book by Shaykh Abbas Qumi

Muntahi al-Amal (Persian: منتهی الآمال) is a book written by Shaykh Abbas Qumi about the Islamic prophet, Muhammad, and his descendants. It was published in 2016.
