= Du'a al-Faraj =

Imam mahdi follower

Du'a al-Faraj (Arabic: دُعَاء ٱلْفَرَج) is a dua which is attributed to Imam Mahdi. It begins with the phrase of "ʾIlāhī ʿaẓuma l-balāʾ", meaning "O God, the calamity has become immense". The initial part of the dua was quoted for the first time in the book of Kunuz al-Nijah by Shaykh Tabarsi. According to Ayatollah Bahjat, the recitation of Dua Al-Faraj is the best act in order not to be destroyed in the end times.

== Terminology ==
In Islamic terminology, the word du’a or dua (Arabic: دعاء) literally means invocation, which is regarded as the act of supplication, and Muslims consider it as a deep practice of worship. The word of dua is derived from an Arabic word which means “summon” or “call out”, while Faraj means emancipation of sorrow, and opening (or improvement in the works/affairs).

== Sources ==
Du'a Faraj which is attributed to Imam Mahdi, has been quoted in diverse compilations such as Konuz al-Nejah (Sheikh Tabarsi), Wasael al-Shia (of Sheikh Al-Hurr al-Aamili), Jamal al-Usbu (of Sayyed Ibn Tawus) and so on. It is quoted that Imam Mahdi taught du'a Faraj to Muhammad ibn Ahmad ibn Abi Layth, who was sheltered to Kadhimiya from the fear of being killed. He saved himself of being killed by reciting this du'a. This supplication is also available in the famous book of Mafatih al-Janan. Besides, the du'a of “Allahuma Kon LeWaliyyek al-Hujjat ibn al-Hassan (which means: O Allah, be, for Your representative, the Hujjat (proof), son of AlHassan)” is also as famous as Du'a al-Faraj by Shia Muslims.

== Dua with Arabic text ==
اِلـهي عَظُمَ الْبَلاءُ، وَبَرِحَ الْخَفاءُ، وَانْكَشَفَ الْغِطاءُ، وَانْقَطَعَ الرَّجاءُ، وَضاقَتِ الأرض، وَمُنِعَتِ السَّماءُ، واَنْتَ الْمُسْتَعانُ، وَاِلَيْكَ الْمُشْتَكى، وَعَلَيْكَ الْمُعَوَّلُ فِي الشِّدَّةِ والرَّخاءِ، اَللّـهُمَّ صَلِّ عَلى مُحَمَّد وَآلِ مُحَمَّد، اُولِي الأمر الَّذينَ فَرَضْتَ عَلَيْنا طاعَتَهُمْ، وَعَرَّفْتَنا بِذلِكَ مَنْزِلَتَهُمْ، فَفَرِّجْ عَنا بِحَقِّهِمْ فَرَجاً عاجِلاً قَريباً كَلَمْحِ الْبَصَرِ اَوْ هُوَ اَقْرَبُ، يا مُحَمَّدُ يا عَلِيُّ يا عَلِيُّ يا مُحَمَّدُ اِكْفِياني فَاِنَّكُما كافِيانِ، وَانْصُراني فَاِنَّكُما ناصِرانِ، يا مَوْلانا يا صاحِبَ الزَّمانِ، الْغَوْثَ الْغَوْثَ الْغَوْثَ، اَدْرِكْني اَدْرِكْني اَدْرِكْني، السّاعَةَ السّاعَةَ السّاعَةَ، الْعَجَلَ الْعَجَلَ الْعَجَل، يا اَرْحَمَ الرّاحِمينَ، بِحَقِّ مُحَمَّد وَآلِهِ الطّاهِرينَ

== Text ==
"O Allah, terrible was the calamity, and its evil consequences are visible, the covering has been removed, (all) hopes have been cut off, the (plentiful) earth has shrunk (with very little to spare), the heavenly blessings have been withheld. You alone can help, we refer our grief and sorrow to You, we have full faith in You, in the time of distress, as well as in good fortune. O Allah, send blessings on Muhammad and on the children of Muhammad, whom we must obey as per Your command, through which we become aware of their rank and status, and let there be joy after sorrow for us, for their sake, right away, in the twinkle of an eye, more rapidly than that. O Muhammad, O Ali, O Ali, O Muhammad, Give me enough, because both of you provide sufficiently. Help me, because both of you help and protect."

"O our master, O the living Imam, HELP! HELP! HELP! Reach me! Reach me! Reach me! At once, in this hour. Be quick, be quick, be quick, O the most merciful, for the sake of Muhammad and his pure children"

== See also ==
- Dua Al-Ahd
- Dua An-Nudbah
- Dua Allahumma kun li-waliyyik
- Reappearance of Hujjat Allah al-Mahdi
- Du'a Kumayl
- Du'a Abu Hamza al-Thumali
