= Du'a Nudba =

Islamic supplication

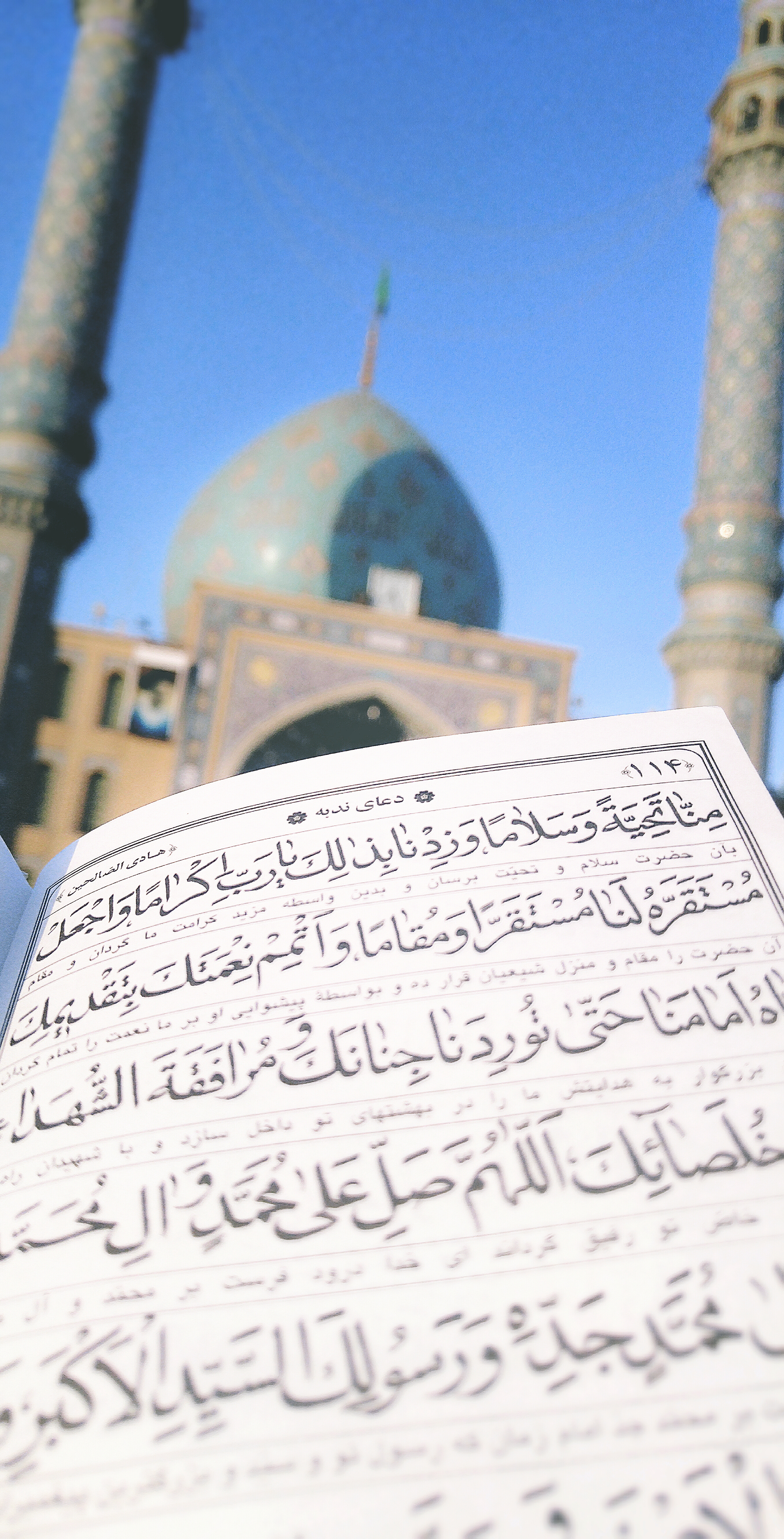
Reciting Du'a Nudba in the Jamkaran Mosque.

Du'a Nudba (Arabic: دُعَاء ٱلنُّدْبَة) is one of the major Shia supplications about Imam Al-Mahdi and his reappearance. Nudba means to cry and Shias read the supplication to ask for help and early reappearance of Imam Al-Mahdi. The supplication is recited during Eid al-Fitr, Eid al-Adha, Eid al-Ghadeer, and every Friday morning. Mazar al-Kabir, Mazar al-Ghadim, and Mesbaho al-Zaer were narrated the supplication. Proponents say these books were written with authentic narrators such as Sayyed Ibn Tawus. Muhammad Baqir Majlisi wrote this prayer in Zaad-ul-Maad from Imam Ja'far al-Sadiq. Also, Albazofari, a person who lived in minor occultation, narrated from The Four Deputies of Imam Mahdi that Imam Mahdi said to read the prayer. However there is a significant school of thought that claims inauthenticity of the Dua.

The supplication starts by glorifying and praising Allah and sending his peace and blessing upon the Prophet (s) and his progeny. It continues explaining the purpose of choosing prophets and saints and the fact that they were appointed by Allah.

It then moves on to the succession of Imam Ali (a) and expresses longing for the final infallible from the Prophet's lineage, Imam al-Mahdi (a), highlighting qualities that set him apart from any false claimant. Unlike impostors, he will truly establish peace and well-being, implementing justice and equity in a tangible, not symbolic, manner. Imam Mahdi (a) will avenge the blood of the martyrs of Karbala, fulfilling a divine promise of justice.

== Reference in Baha'i texts ==
The Du'a Nudba, referenced in Baháʼu'lláh's Kitáb-i-Íqán, serves as a testament to the unquestionable authority of the Manifestation of God to renew religious laws - abrogate old ones, confirm new ones, and ultimately establish a new religion.

These lines from the Du'a are specified to illustrate this point: "Where is He Who is preserved to renew the ordinances and laws? Where is He who hath the authority to transform the Faith and the followers thereof?"

Baháʼu'lláh comments:

"Behold, how, notwithstanding these and similar traditions, they [who deny the new Manifestation] idly contend that the laws formerly revealed must in no wise be altered. And yet, is not the object of every Revelation to effect a transformation in the whole character of mankind, a transformation that shall manifest itself, both outwardly and inwardly, that shall affect both its inner life and external conditions? For if the character of mankind be not changed, the futility of God’s universal Manifestation would be apparent."

== See also ==
- Dua Al-Ahd
- Dua Al-Faraj
- Du'a Kumayl
- Mujeer Du'a
- Jawshan Saqeer
- Du'a Abu Hamza al-Thumali
- Du'a al-Sabah
