= Mujeer Du'a =

Islamic prayer

The Mujeer supplication (Arabic: دعاء المجير, romanized: Mujeer Du'a) is an Islamic prayer or Dua said on the 13th, 14th, and 15th days of the month of Ramadan. Jibra'il (Gabriel) is said to have taught the prayer to Muhammad when he was praying at Maqam Ibrahim.

The Mujeer supplication text was mentioned in the books Balad al-Amin and Misbuh by Ibrahim ibn Ali A’meli Kafa’mi.

== Content ==
The supplication praises Allah. The sentences are short and after two of them, a sentence meaning “give us refuge from the everlasting fire, O Giver Of Refuge” is repeated. The words "Subhaanaka" ("Glory be to You") and "Ta-aalayta" ("Exalted be You") are frequently used in the prayer.

Part of the Mujeer supplication and its English pronunciation and translation:

سُبْحانَكَ يا اَللهُ تَعالَيْتَ يا رَحْمنُ اَجِرْنا مِنَ النّارِ يا مُجيرُ
- Pronunciation: subhaanaka yaa Allaaho ta-aalayta yaa rahmaano ajirnaa menan naare yaa mojeer
- Translation: Glory be to You O Allah! Exalted be You O Beneficent! Give us refuge from the everlasting fire, O Giver Of Refuge!

سُبْحانَكَ يا رَحيمُ تَعالَيْتَ يا كَريمُ اَجِرْنا مِنَ النّارِ يا مُجيرُ
- Pronunciation: subhaanaka yaa raheemo ta-aalayta yaa kareem ajirnaa menan naare yaa mojeer
- Translation: Glory be to You O Merciful! Exalted be You O Generous! Give us refuge from the everlasting fire, O Giver Of Refuge!

== Purpose ==
Muslims recite the Mujeer for absolution and to be saved from the fire of Akhirah. In the opinion of Ayatollah Mojtahedi everyone who reads the Du'a in the thirteenth, fourteenth, and fifteenth days of Ramadan will have their sins forgiven. Some Shia Muslims claim that saying the prayer "is also very effective for the cure of the sick, fulfillment of debts, acquisition of wealth and relief from sorrows."

== See also ==
- Du'a Kumayl
- Du'a Nudba
- Du'a al-Baha
- Supplication of Abu Hamza al-Thumali
- Jawshan Kabir
- Jawshan Saqeer
- Du'a al-Sabah
