= Supplication of Abu Hamza al-Thumali =

Islamic prayer attributed to Ali Zayn al-Abidin

The supplication of Abu Hamza al-Thumali (Arabic: دعاء أبي حمزة الثمالي) is a dua attributed to Ali ibn al-Husayn, the great-grandson of the Islamic prophet, Muhammad, and the fourth Shia Imam, also known by the honorific title Zayn al-Abidin (lit. 'ornament of worshippers'). Abu Hamzah Al-Thumali, who was a companion of Zayn al-Abidin, is the principal narrator of this supplication, which appears in Eqbal al-a’mal by Sayyed ibn Tawus. It is said that Zayn al-Abidin recited the supplication every evening or dawn during the month of Ramadan.

== Abu Hamza al-Thumali ==
Thabit ibn Safiya, known also as Abu Hamza al-Thumali, was born in Kufa. Though little is known about his birth, it is believed that he lived in the seventh and eighth centuries. He was a companion of three Shia Imams, namely, Zayn al-Abidin, Muhammad al-Baqir, and Jafar al-Sadiq. It is possible that he was also a companion of Musa al-Kadhim, the seventh Shia Imam.

Abu Hamza is said to have been a close confidante of the Imams. Ali al-Ridha, the eighth Shia Imam, praised him as, "Abu Hamza in his time was similar to Salman in prophet's time." Ahmad ibn Ali al-Najashi, a renowned Shia scholar, maintains that "He [Abu Hamza] was the best of our companions and the most reliable of them in narration and tradition." Abu Hamza authored several theological works, such as the Kitab fi Tafsir al-Quran al-Karim, an exegesis of the Quran, Kitab al-Nawadir, a book on the rare topics, Kitab al-Zuhd on asceticism, and Al-Risalah al-Huquq, which enumerates human rights and responsibilities.

He died in the year 150 AH.

== Chain of authority ==
Abu Hamzah is the first narrator of this supplication from Zayn al-Abidin. The supplication appears in Eqbal al-A'mal by Sayyed ibn Tawus, who also includes the following chain of transmission for the supplication: Sayyed ibn Tawus received the supplication on the authority of Harun ibn Musa ibn Ahmad Talla'ukbara, who, in turn, received it from Hassan bin Mahboob Srad, who received it from Abu Hamza al-Thimali, who received it from Zayn al-Abidin.

Abu Hamzah is recognized as a credible narrator of hadith by notable Shia scholars, including Najasi, Shaykh Tusi, Ibn Babawayh, and Ibn Shahre Ashub, though most Sunni scholars have not confirmed him.

== Contents ==
All praise is for God whom I call upon with my needs whenever I wish, and I entrust Him with my secrets without an intercessor, and He grants me my wishes. All praise is for God whom I do not plead to anyone but Him, for if I pleaded to others, they would not grant me.

The supplication begins with, "O my Lord! Do not discipline me by means of your punishment," and ends with, "Make me content with whatever you have provided me with, O the Most Merciful of all!" This supplication discusses sincere repentance and vividly portrays the darkness of the grave and the hardships of the Day of Judgment. The necessity of following the guidelines laid by Muhammad and his household (Ahl al-Bayt) is also emphasized in the supplication. This dua asks God for abundant bounties, the opportunity to make a pilgrimage to Mecca, protection from evil and ruthless rulers, purification from vices, and relief from laziness, disappointment, and distress.

== Time of recitation ==
Zayn al-Abidin is said to have recited this supplication every night or dawn during Ramadan.

== Reception ==
Several commentaries and explanations have been written by Shia scholars for the supplication of Abu Hamzah Thumali, including

- Shaykh Muhammad Ebrahim ibn al-Mawli abd-Alwahab Sabzevary
- Mawla Muhammad Taqi ibn Hussain Ali al-Heravy al-Esfahany al-Hayery (in his book titled Nahayat al-Amal)
- Mehdi Bahr al-Ulum (in his book titled Al-Rovzat)
- Mohammad-Taqi Mesbah-Yazdi

Ruhollah Khomeini recommended reciting a passage of the dua at a time and contemplating its meaning.

== See also ==
- Dua Kumayl
- Dua Nudba
- Dua al-Baha
- Mujeer dua
- Jawshan Kabir
- Dua Ahd
- Dua al-Sabah
