= Du'a' Kumayl =

Shia prayer

The Du'a' Kumayl (Arabic: دعاء كميل, lit. 'supplication of Kumayl') is a supplication (du'a') attributed to Ali ibn Abi Talib (d. 661), the first Shia Imam, the fourth Rashidun caliph (r. 656–661), and the cousin and son-in-law of the Islamic prophet Muhammad. It has been transmitted on the authority of Kumayl ibn Ziyad (d. c. 708), a close associate of Ali. This du'a' contains esoteric teachings about divine mercy and repentance, and remains popular especially among Shia Muslims.

== About ==
Kumayl ibn Ziyad was a prominent nobleman in Kufa, Iraq. He was outspoken against the Rashidun caliph Uthman (r. 644–656) and was consequently exiled to Hims in Syria. Soon after the assassination of Uthman in 656 CE, he joined the new caliph Ali in Medina as one of his close associates. Later he was appointed by Ali as the governor of Hit, north of Kufa, where he prevented an early incursion by Mu'awiya, the rebellious governor of Syria. Kumayl also fought alongside Ali in the Battle of Siffin in 657 against Mu'awiya. Some years after the assassination of Ali in 661, Kumayl participated in the abortive revolt of Ibn al-Ash'ath in 700 against the Umayyad viceroy al-Hajjaj ibn Yusuf and was executed by him circa 708 for his role in the rebellion and for his continued devotion to Ali.

The Du'a' Kumayl is quoted on the authority of Kumayl, who is said to have learned this du'a' from Ali. In turn, Ali may have attributed the du'a' to al-Khidr, a figure, likely a prophet, who is described but not named in the Quran. Indeed, Ali often referred to al-Khidr as 'his brother', claiming that al-Khidr appeared to him assuming the form of different people. Among Shia scholars, the du'a' is quoted by al-Tusi (d. 1067) in his Misbah al-mutahajjid, by Ibn Tawus (d. 1266) in his Iqbal, and by Sharif al-Murtada (d. 1044). The Du'a' Kumayl is also featured in Mafatih al-jinan, a widely circulated collection of du'a's compiled by the Shia scholar Abbas Qomi (d. 1941). There are several commentaries concerning this du'a', some of which are listed by the Shia jurist Agha Bozorg Tehrani (d. 1970) in his al-Dhari'a ila tasanif al-shi'a. The du'a' was translated to English by the philosopher and academic William Chittick. Especially among Shia Muslims, the Du'a' Kumayl remains popular, recited every Thursday night, and on mid-Shaban. The invocation of this du'a' is said to be "useful for protecting against the evil of enemies, for opening the gates of one's daily bread and for the forgiveness of sins."

== Content ==
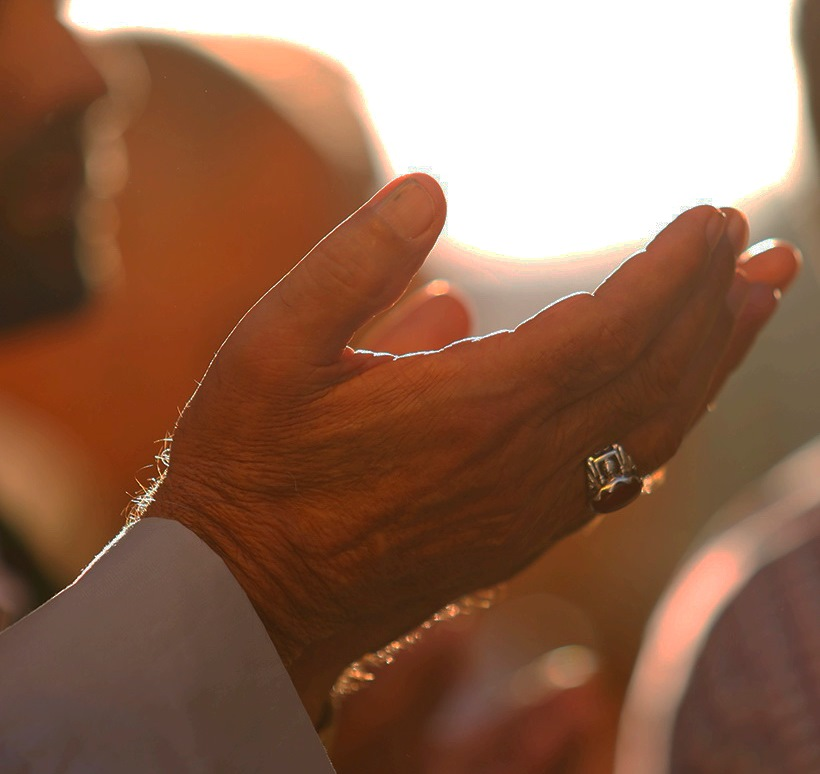
A manner of reciting du'a'

=== Divine mercy ===
Perpetual and constant remembrance of God is highlighted in this du'a', a passage of which reads, "[O God!] Make all my time, in the night and the day, inhabited by Your remembrance." The benefits of this remembrance are explained in another passage of the du'a', "O He whose name is a remedy and whose invocation (dhikr) is the cure."

The Du'a' Kumayl is also rich with esoteric teachings, chief among them the concept of rahma, which might be translated from Arabic as 'loving mercy and compassion'. The du'a' begins, "O God! I ask You by your mercy (rahma) 'which embraces all things'," which alludes to verse 7:156 of the Quran, or verses 6:12 and 6:54 of the Quran, according to which, God has 'inscribed' on His self the principle of mercy. A few verses later, the du'a' continues, "by Your names, which have filled the foundations of all things." Together, these two verses of the supplication imply that the defining quality of all divine names is mercy, suggests the Islamic author Reza Shah-Kazemi. As this mercy fills the foundations of all things, he continues, anything that lacks mercy is only temporary and transient. For Shah-Kazemi then, a central message of the Du'a' Kumayl is that there is hidden mercy even in the outwardly most absurd happenings, a mercy which would be revealed to most people only when the "veil" is lifted at death. Another verse of the supplication reads, "My far-fetched hopes have held me back from my true gain," echoing other statements attributed to Ali, including, "Most shattered minds have been felled by lightning bolts of covetous desires."

=== Repentance ===
Having invoked the mercy of God, the du'a' then appeals to this mercy, "O God! I find no forgiver of my sins, no concealer of my ugly acts, no transformer (mubaddil) of my ugly acts into beautiful ones, but You." The last part is an allusion to verse 25:70 of the Quran, "God will transform their ugly acts into beautiful ones," a divine promise to those who repent and act virtuously afterward. The du'a' continues,

Can You see Yourself tormenting me with Your [hell] fire, after I have professed Your unity? After the knowledge of You my heart has embraced, the remembrance of You my tongue has constantly mentioned, and the love of You to which my mind has clung? After the sincerity of my confession and my supplication, humble before Your Lordship? Far be it from You!
My protector! how should he [the repentant sinner, i.e., himself] remain in the chastisement while he has hope for Your preceding clemency? Or how should the [hell] fire cause him pain while he expects Your bounty and mercy? ... Or how should he be convulsed among its level while You know his sincerity? ... Far be it from You! That is not what is expected of You, nor what is well-known of Your grace.

This refusal to despair from the mercy of God is also evident in another saying attributed to Ali, "The one who truly understands (al-faqih) among all those who understand is the one who never makes people despair of the mercy of God." A few other passages from the Du'a' Kumayl follow below after minor edits.

O He in whose hand is my forelock! O He who knows my affliction and my misery! O He who is aware of my poverty and indigence!
My Lord! My Lord! My Lord! I ask You by Your truth and Your holiness, and the greatest of Your attributes and names, that You make my times in the night and the day inhabited by Your remembrance, and joined to Your service, and my deeds acceptable to You, so that my deeds and my litanies may all be a single litany, and my occupation with Your service everlasting.

And protect me with Your mercy, and make my tongue remember You without ceasing, and my heart enthralled by Your love, and be gracious to me by answering me favorably, and nullify my slips, and forgive my lapses.

O He, whose satisfaction is quickly achieved! Forgive him who owns nothing but supplication, for You do what You will. O He whose name is a remedy, and whose remembrance is a cure, and whose obedience is wealth! Have mercy upon him whose main wealth is hopefulness, and whose weapon is weeping.

== See also ==
- Ali
- Kumayl ibn Ziyad
- Du'a' al-ahd
- Du'a' al-nudba
- Du'a' al-faraj
- Du'a' al-jawshan al-saghir
- Du'a' al-sabah
