= Ali ibn Tawus al-Hilli =

Shia Muslim jurist, theologian and historian (1193–1266)

Sayyid Ibn Tawus السيد ابن طاووس
- Title: Al-Sayyid

Personal life
- Born: 21 January 1193 Hillah, Iraq
- Died: 9 August 1266 (aged 73) Hillah
- Region: Iraq
- Main interest(s): Fiqh, History, Theology

Religious life
- Religion: Islam
- Denomination: Shia
- Sect: Twelver
- Jurisprudence: Ja'fari

Muslim leader
- Students: al-Allamah al-Hilli,

Sayyid Raḍī ad-Deen Alī ibn Mūsa ibn Tawūs al-Ḥasanī (Arabic: السيّد رضي الدين عليّ بن موسى بن جعفر بن طاووس الحسني) (1193–1266 AD), commonly known as Sayyed Ibn Tawus (Arabic: سید بن طاووس), was a Twelver Shia Muslim jurist, theologian, historian and astrologer. He was a descendant of Hasan ibn Ali through his father and a descendant of Husain ibn Ali through his mother. It is said that he met the twelfth Shiite imam, Muhammad al-Mahdi, who according to Shiites is living in occultation. He is known for his library and his numerous works which are still available in their original form and help us learn about the interests of Muslim scholars at the end of the Abbasid era.

== Birth and family life ==
Ibn Tawus was born on 15 Muharram 589 (21 January 1193) in Hilla, to a family descended from the second Shia Imam Hasan ibn Ali. One of his forefathers was a handsome man but with ugly legs, thus his progeny too inherited the nickname or surname "Tawus" (peacock) from him. During his first 14 years of his life he was brought up and taught under many teachers including his father and grandfather. Later on he married Zahra Khatoon the daughter of the Shia Vazir of Nâsir bin Zaidi and settled in Baghdad. Ibn Tawus apparently had good relations with the Caliphs of his time like Muntansir, however he refused to be involved in any political affairs. There is not exact information about his family and number of his children. His children were known by the name of their mother. It is said that he had returned to Hilla in 641 and had gone to Najaf in 645 and then to Karbala in 649 and to Samarra in 652 and on reaching Baghdad he stayed there until Mongols captured the city.

== Under the reign of Mongols ==
When Hulagu Khan conquered Baghdad, he asked the Scholars of the city : "Who is better, a tyrant Muslim ruler or a Kafir(infidel) judicious ruler?" None gave a response to this question but Ibn Tawus who said: "A Kâfir judicious is better." And the other scholars followed him in this reply. A reply that saved the life of many people in the city. Afterwards Hulagu Khan let Ibn Tawus to return to Hilla. However, Hulagu Khan gave the leadership of the Alids and then some cities like Baghdad to him which Ibn Tawus was reluctant to accept. Nasir al-Din al-Tusi advised him to save his life by accepting it and he did so.

== Works ==
Ibn Tawus inherited a big library and he himself wrote numerous books on different topics from theology and ethics to jurisprudence and astronomy some of which have been translated into Persian, Urdu and English. In his books he encouraged readers to learn about Muhammad and the Ahl al-Bayt because he thought such "knowledge about the original sources of religion was the actual understanding of religion". some of his works can be listed as follows:

- Lohoof (Sighs of Sorrow) is among his works which relates the tragic events of Karbala and is translated into English.
- Al-Muhajjal Samaratal Muhajja which is in ethic and encompasses his wills to his children and also different level of his life, in his own words.
- Al-Muhimmat wa al-tatimmat in 10 volumes, and each volume has been published by an independent subject; such as, Falah al-sa'il, Zuhrat al-rabi', Jamal al-usbu', Iqbal al-a'mal. Ibn Tawus has written this book as a complementary to Misbah al-mutahajjid written by al-Shaykh al-Tusi.
- al-Iqbal li salih al-a'mal
- Aman al-akhtar fi wazayif al-asfar
- Jamal al-usbu' fi bi-kamal al-'amal al-mashru'
- al-Duru' al-waqiyya min al-akhtar fima ya'mal kull shahr 'ala al-tikrar
- Sa'd al-nufus li al-su'ud
- al-Tara'if fi ma'rifat mazhab al-tawa'if
- al-Mujtana fi du'a' al-mujtaba
- Muhasibat al-nafs
- Misbah al-shari'a
- Midmar al-sabaq
- al-Malahim wa al-fitan
- al-Luhuf 'ala qatlay al-tufuf
- Muhaj al-da'awat wa manhaj al-'ibadat
- al-Yaqin bi-ikhtisas mawlana 'Ali (a) bi-Imrat al-mu'minin
- Qiath sultan al-wara li sukkan al-thara
- Faraj al-mahmun fi tarikh 'ulama' al-nujum
- Fath al-abwab bayn dhawa l-albab wa bayn rabb al-arbab

== Manuscript works ==
- Rabi' al-shi'a
- Misbah al-za'ir
- Ilzam al-nawasib bi-imamat 'Ali b. Abi Talib
- Al-Hujja
- Muntakhabat asrar al-salat
- Turaf min al-anba' wa al-manaqib
- al-Ibana fi ma'rifat al-kutub al-khazana
- Asrar al-salat
- Al-Sa'adat al-'ibadat
- Farhat al-nazir wa bahjat al-khawatir
- A commentary on Nahj al-balagha
- Al-Masra' al-shin fi qatl al-Husain (a)
- Al-Mazar

== Death ==
Ibn Tawus died in Baghdad on 8 August 1266 and seemingly was buried in Najaf. Ibn Tawus had direct contact with Muhammad al-Mahdi and he was given Isme Âzam, but was not permitted to teach it to his children. He was buried in Hilla, Iraq, where his tomb remains a visitation site for Shia followers.
