= Abbas Qomi =

Iranian Islamic scholar and historian (1877–1941)

- عباس قمی
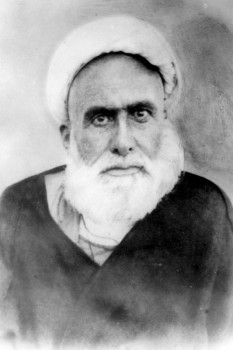
- Sheikh Abbas Qomi
- Title: Grand Ayatollah

Personal life
- Born: 1877 Qom, Iran
- Died: 1941 (aged 63–64) Najaf, Iraq
- Other names: Abbas Qomi, or Muhaddith Qomi
- Occupation: Islamic Scholar (Muhaddith)

Religious life
- Religion: Islam
- Denomination: Shi'a
- Jurisprudence: Ja'fari
- Creed: Twelver

Muslim leader
- Based in: Qom, Najaf
- Period in office: 1877 - 1940

Abbas Qomi (Persian: عباس قمی) also known as Mohaddith Qomi (Persian: محدث قمی) was a Shia scholar, historian, and hadith narrator. He wrote books, including Mafatih al-Janan.

== Biography ==
Abbas Qomi was born in 1877 (1294 AH) in Qom, Iran. In 1904, according to a request from Abdul-Karim Ha'eri Yazdi, he returned to Qom and began teaching, writing, and preaching.

Qomi is a bestselling author in Iran.

== Teachers ==
Muhammad Kazim Khurasani, Sayyid Muhammad Kadhim Tabatabai, Sheikh Taqi Shirazi, and Mirza Husain Noori Tabarsi were his teachers at the Najaf seminary.

== Books ==
Qomi wrote 45 works, including:

Name	Subject
Muntahi al-Amal	The book narrates the life of Muhammad and his descendants.
Manazil al-Akhirah	Explanation of life after death
Nafasul Mahmum (Relating to the heart rending tragedy of Karbala)	The book is about the event of Karbala. It has been translated into English.
Mafatih al-Janan (Keys to the Heavens)	A collection of prayers and supplications narrated from the Ahl al-Bayt

== Death ==
Qomi died on 21 January 1941 at the age of 63. He was buried in the Imam Ali Shrine, Najaf near his teacher, Mohadis Noori.

== See also ==
- List of maraji
- Ziyarat
