= Mafatih al-Jinan =

Islamic text

Mafatih al-Jinan مفاتيح الجنان
- Author: Sheikh Abbas Qomi
- Language: Arabic and Persian (original), Urdu, English, Hindi
- Genre: Hadith, Ibadah
- Publication date: 1925
- Publication place: Iran

Mafatih al-Jinan (Arabic: مفاتيح الجنان, lit. 'Keys to heaven'), by Sheikh Abbas Qumi, is a Twelver Shi'a compilation of Qur'anic Chapters, Dua's, Taaqeebat (acts of worship after daily prayers), acts during Islamic months and days, supplications narrated from the Ahl al-Bayt and the text of Ziyarats.

== Author ==
The Mafatih al-Jinan was authored by Shaykh Abbas Qummi. He was a prominent Shia scholar, historian, and hadith narrator. Over the course of his career, Qummi authored numerous works in the fields of hadith, history, and devotional literature.

== Title and Terminology ==
The title Mafatih al-Jinan is of Arabic origin and translates to "Keys to the Heavens" or "Keys to the Gardens of Paradise." The word mafatih means "keys," while jinan refers to a "garden," "paradise," or "heaven."

== Popularity ==
The book is widely popular in the Twelver world and is widely available at Shi'a shrines in much of Iran and Iraq. The book was originally in Persian translation and commentary accompanied with Arabic text but was later translated into Urdu, English and Hindi. Now, the book is also available in India and Pakistan with Urdu translation. Its application is also available for Android smartphones.

== Mafatih al-Hayat ==
Mafatih al-Hayat, is a religious work written by Abdollah Javadi-Amoli intended to complete Mafatih al-Janan, a book by Sheikh Abbas Qummi.

=== Differences from Mafatih al-Jinan ===
In Amoli's own words, Mafatih al-Jinan focuses on how humans can pursue the right path in the light of God. By contrast, Mafatih al-Hayat discusses the ways a man can interact and communicate with other creatures.

== See also ==
- Al-Sahifa al-Sajjadiyya
- Kitab al-Kafi
- Al-Istibsar
- Tahdhib al-Ahkam
- Man La Yahduruhu al-Faqih
- A`amaal Ummi Dawud
