= Dua Al-Ahd =

Prayer in Shia Islam

Dua Al-Ahd (Arabic: دُعَاء ٱلْعَهْد) is an Arabic language allegiance supplication prayer for Hujjat-Allah al-Mahdi, twelfth Imam of Shia Islam. This is also known as Ahad Nama in Asian Country like India, Pakistan.

Ja'far al-Sadiq narrates in a hadith regarding the importance of reciting the supplication every morning. He stated that: “If one person read the supplication for 40 mornings, will be considered and accounted as helpers of Imam Mahdi and if he dies before the reappearance of Imam al-Mahdi, Allah will raise him up from the grave.” It is common knowledge that reappearance of al-Mahdi takes place alongside Jesus, in effect, the supplication is to seeking reappearance of al-Mahdi and Jesus.

One of the sentences of this supplication is: “O Allah! If my death occurs before his coming, which you have decreed for your servants, then raise me from my grave, wrapped in my shroud, my sword unsheathed, my spear bared, answering the call of the caller in the cities as well as the deserts.”

In the prayer, the Shia pray to Allah that they see Imam Mahdi in their life and consider his helpers. Also, they beseech Allah to solve the problems of their nation and world with Mahdi's reappearance. At the end the reciter says: “Hasten! Hasten! O my Master, O Master of the era.” This phrase refers to the acceleration in the reappearance of the Mahdi.

== Text of the supplication ==
ﺑﺴﻢ ﺍﻟﻠﮧ ﺍﻟﺮﺣﻤﻦ ﺍﻟﺮﺣﯿﻢ ﺍَﻟﻠّٰﮭُﻢَّ ﺭَﺏَّ ﺍﻟﻨُّﻮﺭِ ﺍﻟْﻌَﻈِﯿﻢِ ِ ، ﻭَﺭَﺏَّ ﺍﻟْﻜُﺮْﺳِﻲِّ ﺍﻟﺮَّﻓﻴﻊِ ، ﻭَﺭَﺏَّ ﺍﻟْﺒَﺤْﺮِ ﺍﻟْﻤَﺴْﺠُﻮﺭِ ، ﻭَﻣُﻨْﺰِﻝَ ﺍﻟﺘَّﻮْﺭﺍﺓِ ﻭَﺍﻻِْﻧْﺠﻴﻞِ ﻭَﺍﻟﺰَّﺑُﻮﺭِ ، ﻭَﺭَﺏَّ ﺍﻟﻈِّﻞِّ ﻭَﺍﻟْﺤَﺮُﻭﺭِ ، ﻭَﻣُﻨْﺰِﻝَ ﺍﻟْﻘُﺮْﺁﻥِ ﺍﻟْﻌَﻈﻴﻢِ ، ﻭَﺭَﺏَّ ﺍﻟْﻤَﻼﺋِﻜَﺔِ ﺍﻟْﻤُﻘَﺮَّﺑﻴﻦَ ﻭَﺍﻻَْﻧْﺒِﻴﺎﺀِ ﻭَﺍﻟْﻤُﺮْﺳَﻠﻴﻦَ ، ﺍَﻟﻠّـﻬُﻢَّ ﺍِﻧّﻲ ﺍَﺳْﺎَﻟُﻚَ ﺑِﺎِﺳْﻤِﻚَ ﺍﻟْﻜَﺮﻳﻢِ ، ﻭَﺑِﻨُﻮﺭِ ﻭَﺟْﻬِﻚَ ﺍﻟْﻤُﻨﻴﺮِ ﻭَﻣُﻠْﻜِﻚَ ﺍﻟْﻘَﺪﻳﻢِ ، ﻳﺎ ﺣَﻲُّ ﻳﺎ ﻗَﻴُّﻮﻡُ ﺍَﺳْﺎَﻟُﻚَ ﺑِﺎﺳْﻤِﻚَ ﺍﻟَّﺬﻱ ﺍَﺷْﺮَﻗَﺖْ ﺑِﻪِ ﺍﻟﺴَّﻤﺎﻭﺍﺕُ ﻭَﺍﻻَْﺭَﺿُﻮﻥَ ، ﻭَﺑِﺎﺳْﻤِﻚَ ﺍﻟَّﺬﻱ ﻳَﺼْﻠَﺢُ ﺑِﻪِ ﺍﻻَْﻭَّﻟُﻮﻥَ ﻭَﺍﻻْﺧِﺮُﻭﻥَ ، ﻳﺎ ﺣَﻴّﺎً ﻗَﺒْﻞَ ﻛُﻞِّ ﺣَﻲٍّ ﻭَﻳﺎ ﺣَﻴّﺎً ﺑَﻌْﺪَ ﻛُﻞِّ ﺣَﻲٍّ ﻭَﻳﺎ ﺣَﻴّﺎً ﺣﻴﻦَ ﻻ ﺣَﻲَّ ﻳﺎ ﻣُﺤْﻴِﻲَ ﺍﻟْﻤَﻮْﺗﻰ ﻭَﻣُﻤﻴﺖَ ﺍﻻَْﺣْﻴﺎﺀِ ، ﻳﺎ ﺣَﻲُّ ﻻ ﺍِﻟـﻪَ ﺍِﻟّﺎ ﺍَﻧْﺖَ ، ﺍَﻟﻠّـﻬُﻢَّ ﺑَﻠِّﻎْ ﻣَﻮْﻻﻧَﺎ ﺍﻻِْﻣﺎﻡَ ﺍﻟْﻬﺎﺩِﻱَ ﺍﻟْﻤَﻬْﺪِﻱَّ ﺍﻟْﻘﺎﺋِﻢَ ﺑِﺎَﻣْﺮِﻙَ ﺻَﻠَﻮﺍﺕُ ﺍﻟﻠﻪِ ﻋَﻠَﻴْﻪِ ﻭ ﻋَﻠﻰ ﺁﺑﺎﺋِﻪِ ﺍﻟﻄّﺎﻫِﺮﻳﻦَ ﻋَﻦْ ﺟَﻤﻴﻊِ ﺍﻟْﻤُﺆْﻣِﻨﻴﻦَ ﻭَﺍﻟْﻤُﺆْﻣِﻨﺎﺕِ ﻓﻲ ﻣَﺸﺎﺭِﻕِ ﺍﻻَْﺭْﺽِ ﻭَﻣَﻐﺎﺭِﺑِﻬﺎ ﺳَﻬْﻠِﻬﺎ ﻭَﺟَﺒَﻠِﻬﺎ ﻭَﺑَﺮِّﻫﺎ ﻭَﺑَﺤْﺮِﻫﺎ ، ﻭَﻋَﻨّﻲ ﻭَﻋَﻦْ ﻭﺍﻟِﺪَﻱَّ ﻣِﻦَ ﺍﻟﺼَّﻠَﻮﺍﺕِ ﺯِﻧَﺔَ ﻋَﺮْﺵِ ﺍﻟﻠﻪِ ﻭَﻣِﺪﺍﺩَ ﻛَﻠِﻤﺎﺗِﻪِ ، ﻭَﻣﺎ ﺍَﺣْﺼﺎﻩُ ﻋِﻠْﻤُﻪُ ﻭَﺍَﺣﺎﻁَ ﺑِﻪِ ﻛِﺘﺎﺑُﻪُ ، ﺍَﻟﻠّـﻬُﻢَّ ﺍِﻧّﻲ ﺍُﺟَﺪِّﺩُ ﻟَﻪُ ﻓﻲ ﺻَﺒﻴﺤَﺔِ ﻳَﻮْﻣﻲ ﻫﺬﺍ ﻭَﻣﺎ ﻋِﺸْﺖُ ﻣِﻦْ ﺍَﻳّﺎﻣﻲ ﻋَﻬْﺪﺍً ﻭَﻋَﻘْﺪﺍً ﻭَﺑَﻴْﻌَﺔً ﻟَﻪُ ﻓﻲ ﻋُﻨُﻘﻲ ، ﻻ ﺍَﺣُﻮﻝُ ﻋَﻨْﻬﺎ ﻭَﻻ ﺍَﺯُﻭﻝُ ﺍَﺑَﺪﺍً ، ﺍَﻟﻠّـﻬُﻢَّ ﺍﺟْﻌَﻠْﻨﻲ ﻣِﻦْ ﺍَﻧْﺼﺎﺭِﻩِ ﻭَﺍَﻋْﻮﺍﻧِﻪِ ﻭَﺍﻟﺬّﺍﺑّﻴﻦَ ﻋَﻨْﻪُ ﻭَﺍﻟْﻤُﺴﺎﺭِﻋﻴﻦَ ﺍِﻟَﻴْﻪِ ﻓﻲ ﻗَﻀﺎﺀِ ﺣَﻮﺍﺋِﺠِﻪِ ، ﻭَﺍﻟْﻤُﻤْﺘَﺜِﻠﻴﻦَ ﻻَِﻭﺍﻣِﺮِﻩِ ﻭَﺍﻟُْﻤﺤﺎﻣﻴﻦَ ﻋَﻨْﻪُ ، ﻭَﺍﻟﺴّﺎﺑِﻘﻴﻦَ ﺍِﻟﻰ ﺍِﺭﺍﺩَﺗِﻪِ ﻭَﺍﻟْﻤُﺴْﺘَﺸْﻬَﺪﻳﻦَ ﺑَﻴْﻦَ ﻳَﺪَﻳْﻪِ ، ﺍَﻟﻠّـﻬُﻢَّ ﺍِﻥْ ﺣﺎﻝَ ﺑَﻴْﻨﻲ ﻭَﺑَﻴْﻨَﻪُ ﺍﻟْﻤَﻮْﺕُ ﺍﻟَّﺬﻱ ﺟَﻌَﻠْﺘَﻪُ ﻋَﻠﻰ ﻋِﺒﺎﺩِﻙَ ﺣَﺘْﻤﺎً ﻣَﻘْﻀِﻴّﺎً ﻓَﺎَﺧْﺮِﺟْﻨﻲ ﻣِﻦْ ﻗَﺒْﺮﻱ ﻣُﺆْﺗَﺰِﺭﺍً ﻛَﻔَﻨﻰ ﺷﺎﻫِﺮﺍً ﺳَﻴْﻔﻲ ﻣُﺠَﺮِّﺩﺍً ﻗَﻨﺎﺗﻲ ﻣُﻠَﺒِّﻴﺎً ﺩَﻋْﻮَﺓَ ﺍﻟﺪّﺍﻋﻲ ﻓِﻲ ﺍﻟْﺤﺎﺿِﺮِ ﻭَﺍﻟْﺒﺎﺩﻱ ، ﺍَﻟﻠّـﻬُﻢَّ ﺍَﺭِﻧﻲِ ﺍﻟﻄَّﻠْﻌَﺔَ ﺍﻟﺮَّﺷﻴﺪَﺓَ ، ﻭَﺍﻟْﻐُﺮَّﺓَ ﺍﻟْﺤَﻤﻴﺪَﺓَ ، ﻭَﺍﻛْﺤُﻞْ ﻧﺎﻇِﺮﻱ ﺑِﻨَﻈْﺮَﺓ ﻣﻨِّﻲ ﺍِﻟَﻴْﻪِ ، ﻭَﻋَﺠِّﻞْ ﻓَﺮَﺟَﻪُ ﻭَﺳَﻬِّﻞْ ﻣَﺨْﺮَﺟَﻪُ ، ﻭَﺍَﻭْﺳِﻊْ ﻣَﻨْﻬَﺠَﻪُ ﻭَﺍﺳْﻠُﻚْ ﺑﻲ ﻣَﺤَﺠَّﺘَﻪُ ، ﻭَﺍَﻧْﻔِﺬْ ﺍَﻣْﺮَﻩُ ﻭَﺍﺷْﺪُﺩْ ﺍَﺯْﺭَﻩُ ، ﻭَﺍﻋْﻤُﺮِ ﺍﻟﻠّـﻬُﻢَّ ﺑِﻪِ ﺑِﻼﺩَﻙَ ، ﻭَﺍَﺣْﻲِ ﺑِﻪِ ﻋِﺒﺎﺩَﻙَ ، ﻓَﺎِﻧَّﻚَ ﻗُﻠْﺖَ ﻭَﻗَﻮْﻟُﻚَ ﺍﻟْﺤَﻖُّ : ( ﻇَﻬَﺮَ ﺍﻟْﻔَﺴﺎﺩُ ﻓِﻲ ﺍﻟْﺒَﺮِّ ﻭَﺍﻟْﺒَﺤْﺮِ ﺑِﻤﺎ ﻛَﺴَﺒَﺖْ ﺍَﻳْﺪِﻱ ﺍﻟﻨّﺎﺱِ ) ، ﻓَﺎَﻇْﻬِﺮِ ﺍﻟّﻠﻬُﻢَّ ﻟَﻨﺎ ﻭَﻟِﻴَّﻚَ ﻭَﺍﺑْﻦَ ﺑِﻨْﺖِ ﻧَﺒِﻴِّﻚَ ﺍﻟْﻤُﺴَﻤّﻰ ﺑِﺎﺳْﻢِ ﺭَﺳُﻮﻟِﻚَ ﺣَﺘّﻰ ﻻ ﻳَﻈْﻔَﺮَ ﺑِﺸَﻲْﺀ ﻣِﻦَ ﺍﻟْﺒﺎﻃِﻞِ ﺍِﺍﻟّﺎ ﻣَﺰَّﻗَﻪُ ، ﻭَﻳُﺤِﻖَّ ﺍﻟْﺤَﻖَّ ﻭَﻳُﺤَﻘِّﻘَﻪُ ، ﻭَﺍﺟْﻌَﻠْﻪُ ﺍَﻟﻠّـﻬُﻢَّ ﻣَﻔْﺰَﻋﺎً ﻟِﻤَﻈْﻠُﻮﻡِ ﻋِﺒﺎﺩِﻙَ ، ﻭَﻧﺎﺻِﺮﺍً ﻟِﻤَﻦْ ﻻ ﻳَﺠِﺪُ ﻟَﻪُ ﻧﺎﺻِﺮﺍً ﻏَﻴْﺮَﻙَ ، ﻭَﻣُﺠَﺪِّﺩﺍً ﻟِﻤﺎ ﻋُﻄِّﻞَ ﻣِﻦْ ﺍَﺣْﻜﺎﻡِ ﻛِﺘﺎﺑِﻚَ ، ﻭَﻣُﺸَﻴِّﺪﺍً ﻟِﻤﺎ ﻭَﺭَﺩَ ﻣِﻦْ ﺍَﻋْﻼﻡِ ﺩﻳﻨِﻚَ ﻭَﺳُﻨَﻦِ ﻧَﺒِﻴِّﻚَ ﺻَﻠَّﻰ ﺍﻟﻠﻪُ ﻋَﻠَﻴْﻪِ ﻭَﺁﻟِﻪِ ، ﻭَﺍﺟْﻌَﻠْﻪُ ﺍَﻟﻠّـﻬُﻢَّ ﻣِﻤَّﻦْ ﺣَﺼَّﻨْﺘَﻪُ ﻣِﻦ ﺑَﺄﺱِ ﺍﻟْﻤُﻌْﺘَﺪﻳﻦَ ، ﺍَﻟﻠّـﻬُﻢَّ ﻭَﺳُﺮَّ ﻧَﺒِﻴَّﻚَ ﻣُﺤَﻤَّﺪﺍً ﺻَﻠَّﻰ ﺍﻟﻠﻪُ ﻋَﻠَﻴْﻪِ ﻭَﺁﻟِﻪِ ﺑِﺮُﺅْﻳَﺘِﻪِ ﻭَﻣَﻦْ ﺗَﺒِﻌَﻪُ ﻋَﻠﻰ ﺩَﻋْﻮَﺗِﻪِ ، ﻭَﺍﺭْﺣَﻢِ ﺍﺳْﺘِﻜﺎﻧَﺘَﻨﺎ ﺑَﻌْﺪَﻩُ ، ﺍَﻟﻠّـﻬُﻢَّ ﺍﻛْﺸِﻒْ ﻫﺬِﻩِ ﺍﻟْﻐُﻤَّﺔَ ﻋَﻦْ ﻫﺬِﻩِ ﺍﻻُْﻣَّﺔِ ﺑِﺤُﻀُﻮﺭِﻩِ ، ﻭَﻋَﺠِّﻞْ ﻟَﻨﺎ ﻇُﻬُﻮﺭَﻩُ ، ﺍِﻧَّﻬُﻢْ ﻳَﺮَﻭْﻧَﻪُ ﺑَﻌﻴﺪﺍً ﻭَﻧَﺮﺍﻩُ ﻗَﺮﻳﺒﺎً ، ﺑِﺮَﺣْﻤَﺘِـﻚَ ﻳـﺎ ﺍَﺭْﺣَﻢَ ﺍﻟﺮّﺍﺣِﻤﻴﻦَ
Then one should gently strike his right thigh with his palm and say:
ﺍَﻟْﻌَﺠَﻞَ ﺍﻟْﻌَﺠَﻞَ ﻳﺎ ﻣَﻮْﻻﻯَ ﻳﺎ ﺻﺎﺣِﺐَ ﺍﻟﺰَّﻣﺎﻥ

English translation:

In the name of God, the Most Gracious, the Most Merciful. O God, Lord of the Great Light, Lord of the Sublime Throne, Lord of the sealed sea, Sender down of the Torah, the Gospel, and the Psalms, Lord of shade and heat, Sender down of the Great Qur’an, Lord of the angels brought near. And the prophets and messengers, O God, I ask You by Your noble name, and by the light of Your radiant face and Your ancient kingdom, O Ever-Living, O Self-Sustaining, I ask You by Your name by which the heavens and the earth shine, and by Your name by which the first and the last are made right, O Alive before every living thing, and O Alive after every living thing, and O Alive when there is no living thing, O Giver of life to the dead and Giver of death to the living, O Alive, there is no god but You, O God, convey to our Master, the Guide, the Mahdi, the One who rises with Your command, the prayers of God be upon him and his pure fathers, from all of them. To the believing men and women in the east and west of the earth, its plains and mountains, its land and sea, and to my parents and me, with prayers that are as heavy as the Throne of God and the ink of His words, and that which His knowledge has counted and His Book has encompassed. O God, I renew for Him this morning. Today and throughout my life, I have made a covenant, a pact, and a pledge to Him that I will never turn away from or deviate from. O God, make me one of His supporters, His helpers, His defenders, and those who hasten to Him in fulfilling His needs, and those who obey His orders and advocate for Him. And those who preceded Him in His will and were martyred before Him. O God, if death, which You have made inevitable for Your servants, stands between me and Him, then bring me out of my grave wearing my shroud, brandishing my sword, unsheathing my spear, answering the call of the caller in the present. And the Beginner, O God, show me the righteous face, and the praiseworthy forelock, and adorn my eyes with a glance from me towards him, and hasten his relief and facilitate his way out, and expand his path and guide me to his straight path, and carry out his command and strengthen his back, and prosper, O God. By it, in your country, and inspire your servants with it, for you said, and your word is the truth: (Corruption has appeared on land and sea because of what the hands of people have earned), so, O God, make apparent for us your guardian and the son of the daughter of your Prophet, who is called by the name of your Messenger, so that he does not gain any of falsehood. Except that he tears it apart, and establishes the truth and makes it true, and make it, O God, a refuge for the oppressed among Your servants, and a supporter for those who find no supporter other than You, and a renewer of what has been neglected of the rulings of Your Book, and a builder of what has been transmitted of the signs of Your religion and the Sunnah of Your Prophet, may God bless him and grant him peace. And his family, and make him, O God, among those whom You have protected from the wrath of the aggressors. O God, and please Your Prophet Muhammad, may God’s prayers and peace be upon him and his family, with seeing him and those who followed his call, and have mercy on our submission after him. O God, remove this affliction from this.
Then one should gently strike his right thigh with his palm and say: Hurry, hurry, O my Master, O Master of the Age

== See also ==
- Reappearance of Muhammad al-Mahdi
- Du'a al-Faraj
- Dua Allahumma kun li-waliyyik
- Du'a Nudba
