= Islam =

Abrahamic monotheistic religion

- الإسلام al-Islām
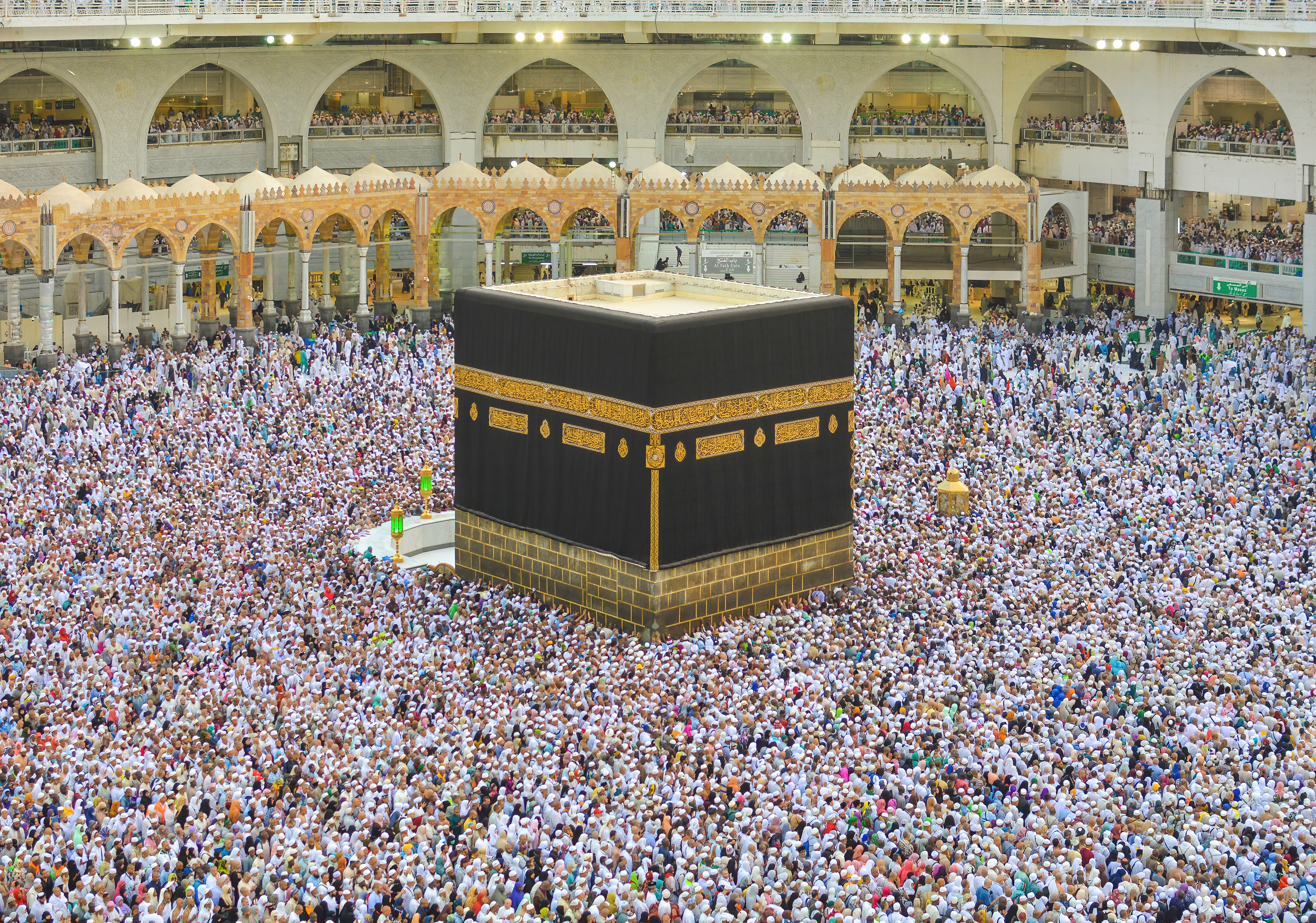
- The Kaaba at Masjid al-Haram in Mecca, Saudi Arabia, the holiest Islamic site
- Classification: Abrahamic
- Scripture: Quran; Prophet's Traditions: Hadith; Exegesis: Tafsir
- Theology: Monotheistic
- Region: Worldwide
- Language: Quranic Arabic
- Territory: Islamic world
- Founder: Muhammad
- Origin: c. 610 CE; Jabal al-Nour
- Separations: Bábism; Baháʼí Faith; Druze faith; Yazidism
- Number of followers: est. 2 billion ▲ (individually referred to as Muslims, collectively referred to as the Ummah)

Islam (Note: /ˈɪzlɑːm, ˈɪzlæm/ IZ-la(h)m; Arabic: الإسلام, romanized: al-Islām, IPA: [alʔisˈlaːm], lit. 'submission [to the will of God]') is an Abrahamic religion based on the Quran and the teachings of Muhammad. The monotheistic religion has an estimated 2 billion worldwide adherents, called Muslims. Islam is the world's second-largest religious population after Christianity.

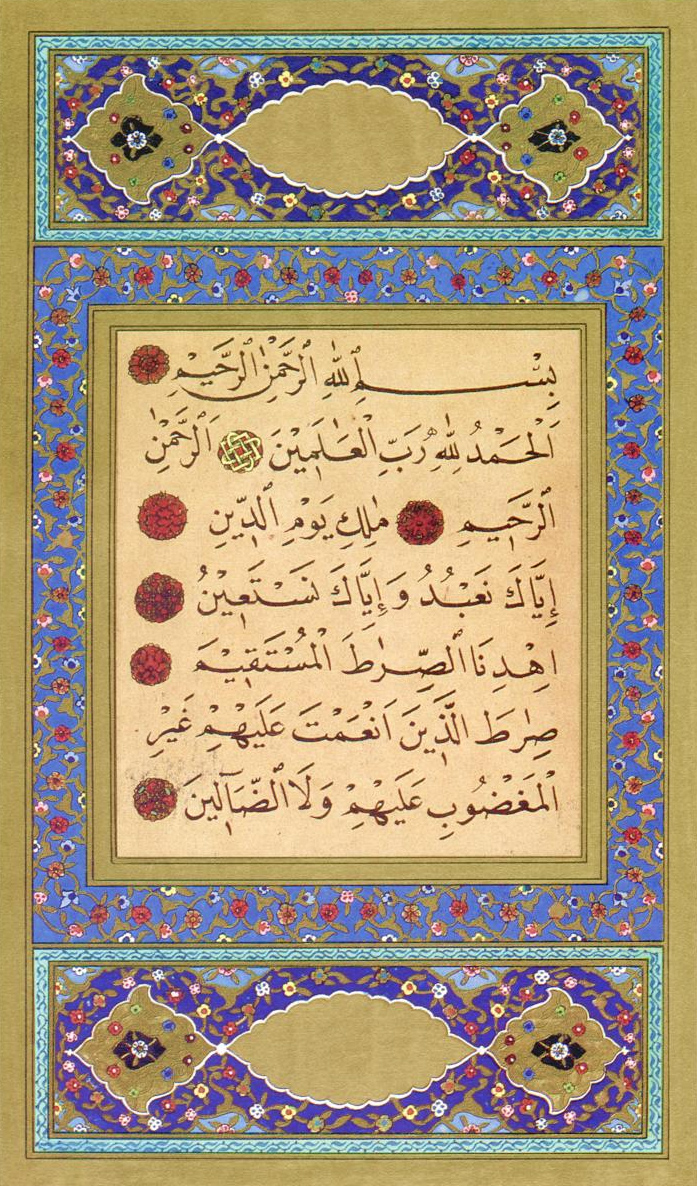
Al-Fatiha (The Opener), a surah from the Quran

Muslims believe that there is a primordial faith that was revealed many times through earlier prophets and messengers, including Adam, Noah, Abraham, Moses, and Jesus, and they believe that Islam is the universal and complete version of this faith. Muslims consider the Quran to be the verbatim word of God and the unaltered, final revelation. Alongside the Quran, Muslims also believe in previous revelations, such as the Tawrat (Torah), the Zabur (Psalms), and the Injil (Gospel). They believe that Muhammad is the main and final of God's prophets, through whom the religion was completed, and after whom no new prophet or divine law will come. The teachings and normative examples of Muhammad, called the Sunnah, documented in accounts called hadith, provide a constitutional model for Muslims. Islam is based on the belief in the oneness and uniqueness of God (tawhid), and belief in an afterlife (akhirah) with the Last Judgment—wherein the righteous will be rewarded in paradise (jannah) and the unrighteous will be punished in hell (jahannam). The Five Pillars, considered obligatory acts of worship, are the Islamic oath and creed (shahada), daily prayers (salah), almsgiving (zakat), fasting (sawm) in the month of Ramadan, and a pilgrimage (hajj) to Mecca. Islamic law, sharia, touches on virtually every aspect of life, from banking and finance and welfare to men's roles and women's roles and the environment. The two main religious festivals are Eid al-Fitr and Eid al-Adha. The three holiest sites in Islam are Masjid al-Haram in Mecca, Prophet's Mosque in Medina, and al-Aqsa Mosque Compound in Jerusalem.

The religion of Islam originated in Mecca c. 610 CE. Muslims believe this is when Muhammad received his first revelation. By the time of his death, most of the Arabian Peninsula had converted to Islam. Muslim rule expanded outside Arabia under the Rashidun Caliphate. The two main Islamic branches are Sunni Islam (87–90%) and Shia Islam (10–13%). While the Shia–Sunni divide initially arose from disagreements over the succession to Muhammad, they grew to cover a broader dimension, both theologically and juridically. The Sunni canonical hadith collection consists of the six books, while the Shia canonical hadith collection consists of the four books. Muslims make up a majority of the population in 53 countries. Approximately 12% of the world's Muslims live in Indonesia, the most populous Muslim-majority country; 31% live in South Asia; 20% live in the Middle East–North Africa; and 15% live in sub-Saharan Africa. Muslim communities are also present in the Americas, China, and Europe. Muslims are the world's fastest-growing major religious group, according to Pew Research. This is primarily due to a higher fertility rate and younger age structure compared to other major religions.

== Etymology ==
In Arabic, Islam (Arabic: إسلام, lit. 'submission [to God]') is the verbal noun of Form IV originating from the verb سلم (salama), from the triliteral root س-ل-م (Š-L-M), which forms a large class of words mostly relating to concepts of submission, safeness, and peace. In a religious context, it refers to the total surrender to the will of God. A Muslim (مُسْلِم), the word for a follower of Islam, is the active participle of the same verb form, and means "submitter (to God)" or "one who surrenders (to God)". However, Quranic studies scholar Mohsen Goudarzi has argued that in the Quran the word dīn means "worship", the islām means "monotheism" and the muslim means "monotheist". In the Hadith of Gabriel, Islam is presented as one part of a triad that also includes imān (faith) and ihsān (excellence).

Islam itself was historically called Mohammedanism, in the English-speaking world. This term has fallen out of use and is sometimes said to be offensive, as it suggests that a human being, rather than God, is central to Muslims' religion.

== Articles of faith ==
The Islamic creed (aqidah) requires belief in six articles: God, angels, revelation, prophets, the Day of Resurrection, and the divine predestination.

=== God ===
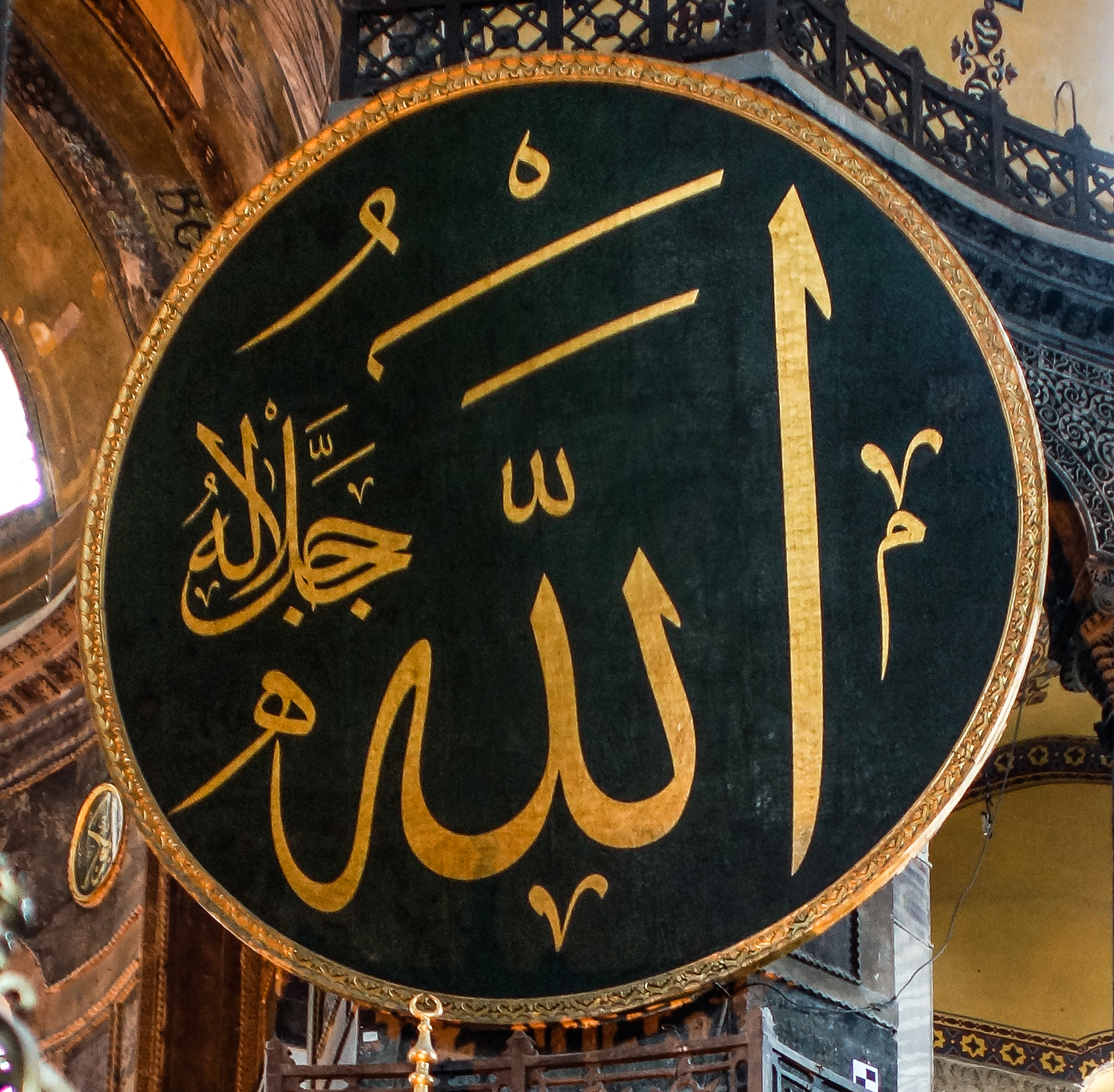
Calligraphy showing the word Allah in Arabic in Hagia Sophia

The central concept of Islam is tawḥīd (Arabic: توحيد), the oneness of God. It is usually thought of as a precise monotheism, but is also panentheistic in Islamic mystical teachings. God is seen as incomparable and without multiplicity of persons such as in the Christian Trinity, and associating multiplicity to God or attributing God's attributes to others is seen as idolatry, called shirk. Thus, Muslims are not iconodules and do not attribute forms to God. God is instead described and referred to by several names or attributes, the most common being Ar-Rahmān (الرحمان) meaning "The Entirely Merciful", and Ar-Rahīm (الرحيم) meaning "The Especially Merciful" which are invoked at the beginning of most chapters of the Quran. The direct Arabic name for God, Allāh (الله), a term with no plural or gender, is also commonly used in other languages by Muslims and Arabic-speaking Christians and Jews to refer to God, whereas ʾilāh (إله) is a term used for a deity or a god in general.

Islam teaches that the creation of everything in the universe was brought into being by God's command as expressed by the wording, "Be, and it is," (Note: Quran 2:117) and that the purpose of existence is to worship God. He is viewed as a personal god and no intermediaries, such as clergy, are needed to enable contact with God. Awareness of God is referred to as taqwa.

=== Angels ===
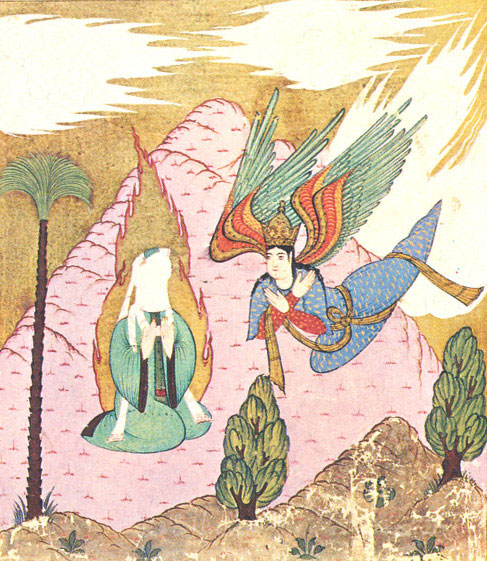
The Archangel Jibreel giving the Annunciation to Mohammed, from the 1595 illustrated edition of the Siyer-i Nebi. Topkapi Palace Museum, Istanbul, Turkey.

Angels (singular: Arabic: ملك, malak) are beings described in the Quran and hadith. They are described as created to worship God and also to serve in other specific duties such as communicating revelations from God, recording every person's actions, and taking a person's soul at the time of death. They are described as being created variously from 'light' (nūr) or 'fire' (nār). Islamic angels are often represented in anthropomorphic forms combined with supernatural images, such as wings, being of great size or wearing heavenly articles. Common characteristics for angels include a lack of bodily needs and desires, such as eating and drinking. Some of them, such as Gabriel (Jibrīl) and Michael (Mika'il), are mentioned by name in the Quran. Angels play a significant role in literature about the Mi'raj, where Muhammad encounters several angels during his journey through the heavens. Further angels have often been featured in Islamic eschatology, theology and philosophy.

=== Scriptures ===
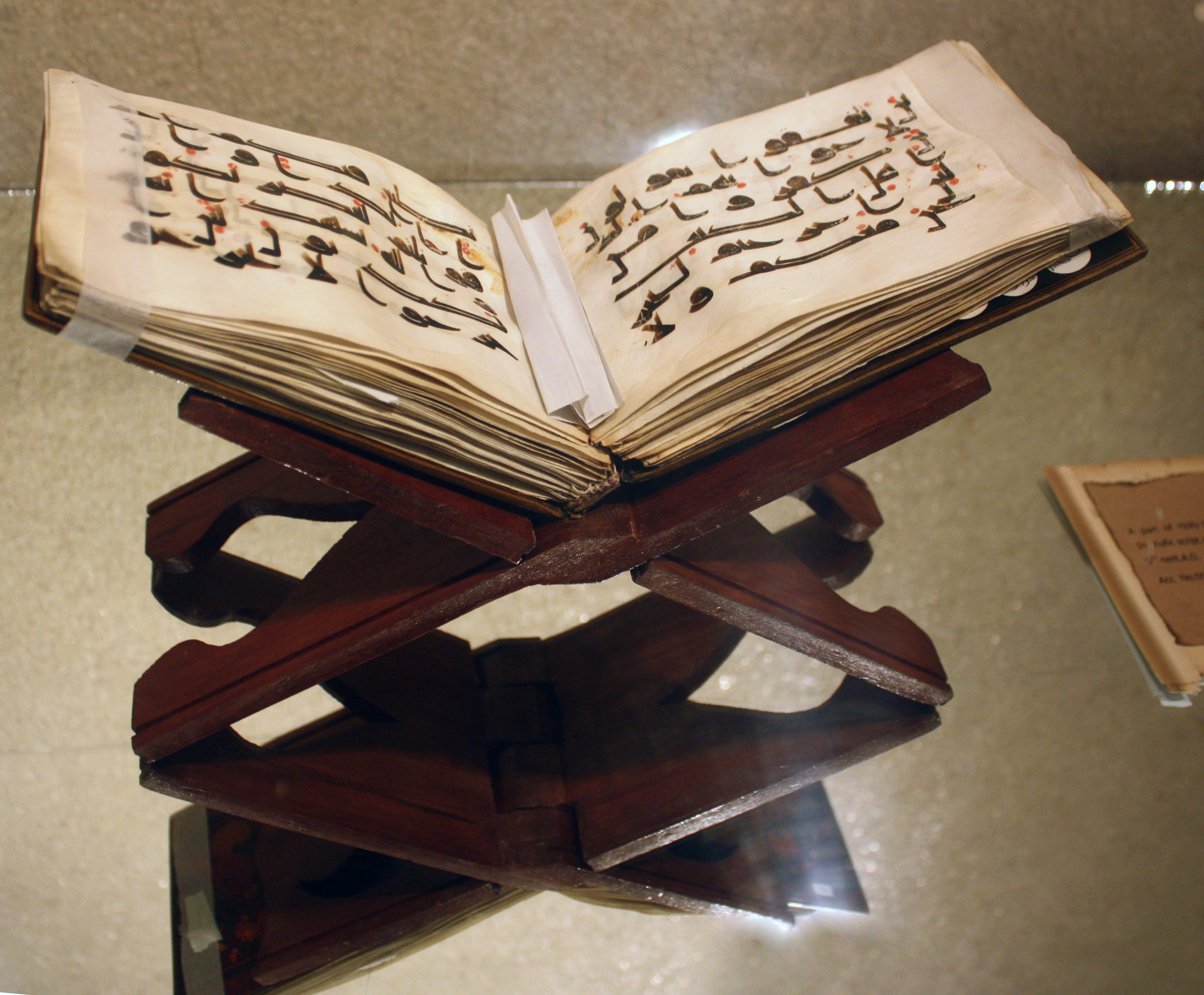
A Quran manuscript resting on a rehal, a book rest for the holy text, c. 9th century

The pre-eminent holy text of Islam is the Quran. Muslims believe that the verses of the Quran were revealed to Muhammad by God, through the archangel Gabriel, on multiple occasions between 610 CE and 632, the year Muhammad died. While Muhammad was alive, these revelations were written down by his companions, although the primary method of transmission was orally through memorization. The Quran is divided into 114 chapters (sūrah) which contain a combined 6,236 verses (āyāt). The chronologically earlier chapters, revealed at Mecca, are concerned primarily with spiritual topics, while the later Medinan chapters discuss more social and legal issues relevant to the Muslim community. Muslim jurists consult the hadith ('accounts'), or the written record of Muhammad's life, to both supplement the Quran and assist with its interpretation. The science of Quranic commentary and exegesis is known as tafsir. In addition to its religious significance, the Quran is widely regarded as the finest work in Arabic literature, and has influenced art and the Arabic language.

Islam also holds that God has sent revelations, called wahy, to different prophets numerous times throughout history. However, Islam teaches that parts of the previously revealed scriptures, such as the Tawrat (Torah) and the Injil (Gospel), have become distorted—either in interpretation, in text, or both, while the Quran (lit. 'Recitation') is viewed as the final, verbatim and unaltered word of God.

=== Prophets ===
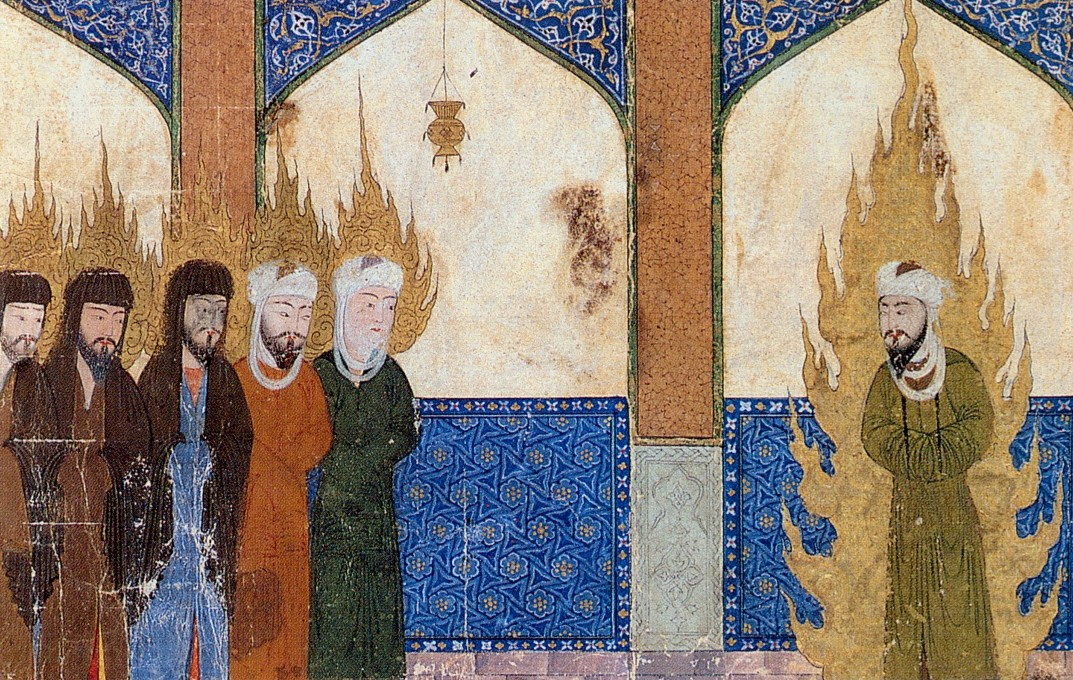
A 15th-century Persian miniature depicting Muhammad leading Abraham, Moses, Jesus and other prophets in prayer

Prophets (Arabic: أنبياء, anbiyāʾ) are believed to have been chosen by God to preach a divine message. Some of these prophets additionally deliver a new book and are called "messengers" (رسول, rasūl). Muslims believe prophets are human and not divine. All of the prophets are said to have preached the same basic message of Islam – submission to the will of God – to various nations in the past, and this is said to account for many similarities among religions. The Quran recounts the names of numerous figures considered prophets in Islam, including Adam, Noah, Abraham, Moses, David and Jesus, among others. The stories associated with the prophets beyond the Quranic accounts are collected and explored in the Qisas al-Anbiya (Stories of the Prophets).

Muslims believe that God sent Muhammad as the final prophet ("Seal of the prophets") to convey the completed message of Islam. In Islam, the "normative" example of Muhammad's life is called the sunnah (literally "trodden path"). Muslims are encouraged to emulate Muhammad's moral behaviors in their daily lives, and the sunnah is seen as crucial to guiding interpretation of the Quran. This example is preserved in traditions known as hadith, which are accounts of his words, actions, and personal characteristics. Hadith Qudsi is a sub-category of hadith, regarded as God's verbatim words quoted by Muhammad that are not part of the Quran. A hadith involves two elements: a chain of narrators, called sanad, and the actual wording, called matn. There are various methodologies to classify the authenticity of hadiths, with the commonly used grading scale being "authentic" or "correct" (صحيح, ṣaḥīḥ); "good" (حسن, ḥasan); or "weak" (ضعيف, ḍaʻīf), among others. The Kutub al-Sittah are a collection of six books, regarded as the most authentic reports in Sunni Islam. Among them is Sahih al-Bukhari, often considered by Sunnis to be one of the most authentic sources after the Quran. Another well-known source of hadiths is known as The Four Books, which Shias consider as the most authentic hadith reference.

=== Resurrection and judgment ===
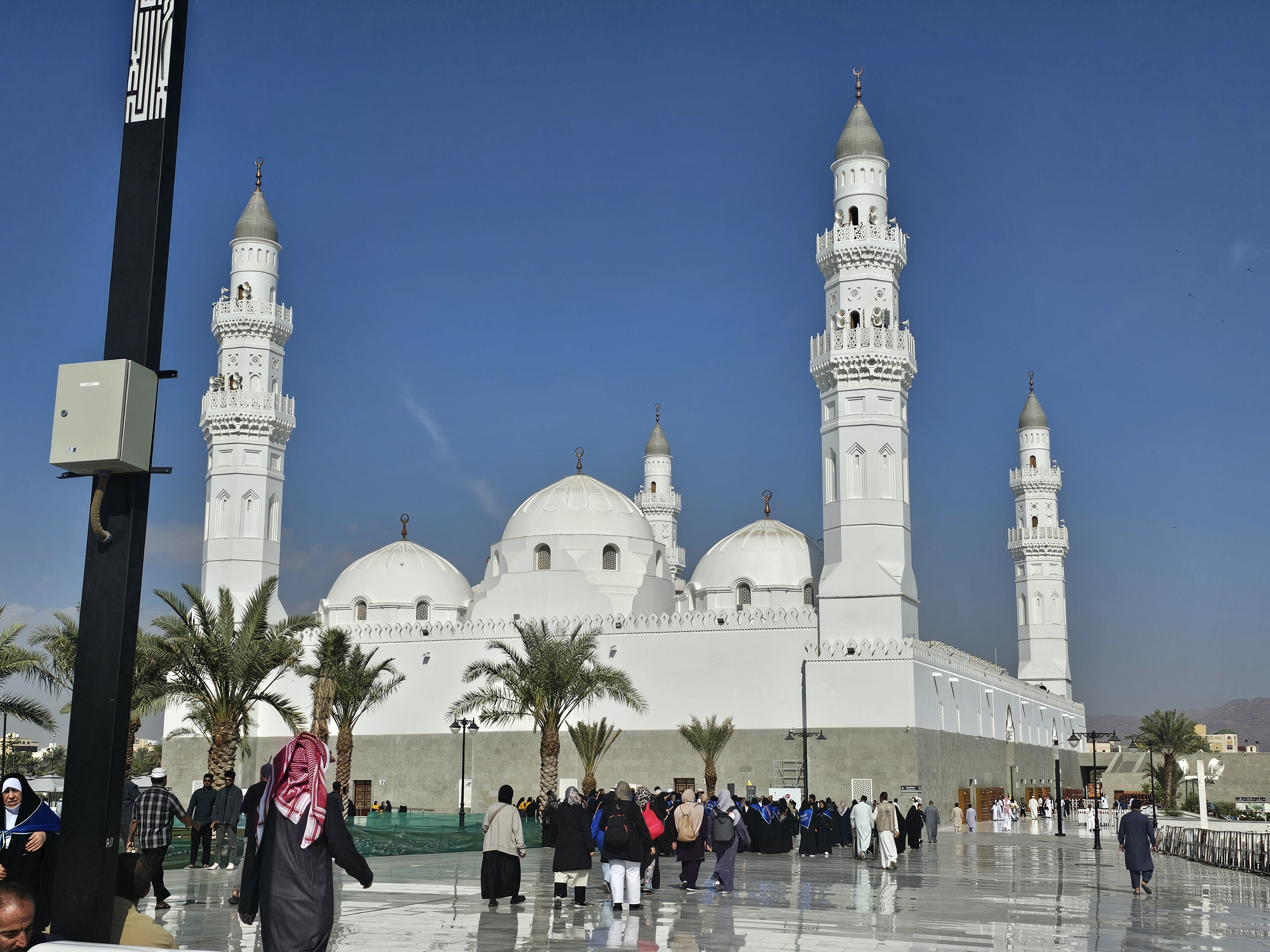
Quba Mosque is the first mosque to be built in Medina after Muhammed's emigration (Hijrah) from Mecca

Belief in the "Day of Resurrection" or Yawm al-Qiyāmah (Arabic: يوم القيامة) is also crucial for Muslims. It is believed that the time of Qiyāmah is preordained by God, but unknown to man. The Quran and the hadith, as well as the commentaries of scholars, describe the trials and tribulations preceding and during the Qiyāmah. The Quran emphasizes bodily resurrection, a break from the pre-Islamic Arabian understanding of death.

On Yawm al-Qiyāmah, Muslims believe all humankind will be judged by their good and bad deeds and consigned to Jannah (paradise) or Jahannam (hell). The Quran in Surat al-Zalzalah describes this as: "So whoever does an atom's weight of good will see it. And whoever does an atom's weight of evil will see it." The Quran lists several sins that can condemn a person to hell. However, the Quran makes it clear that God will forgive the sins of those who repent if he wishes. Good deeds, like charity, prayer, and compassion towards animals will be rewarded with entry to heaven. Muslims view heaven as a place of joy and blessings, with Quranic references describing its features. Mystical traditions in Islam place these heavenly delights in the context of an ecstatic awareness of God. Yawm al-Qiyāmah is also identified in the Quran as Yawm ad-Dīn (يوم الدين "Day of Religion"); (Note: Quran 1:4;) as-Sāʿah (الساعة "the Last Hour"); (Note: Quran 6:31;) and al-Qāriʿah (القارعة "The Clatterer"). (Note: Quran 101:1)

=== Divine predestination ===
Some Muslims believe in divine predestination, (Arabic: القضاء والقدر, al-qadāʾ wa l-qadar) that every matter is decreed by God. The Muʿtazila and certain Shi'as do not believe in the concept. Often, this belief in divine destiny is expressed with the phrase Inshallah, (Arabic: إن شاء الله, if God wills) when speaking on future events.

== Acts of worship ==
There are five acts of worship that are considered duties–the Shahada (declaration of faith), the five daily prayers, Zakat (almsgiving), fasting during Ramadan, and the Hajj pilgrimage–collectively known as "The Pillars of Islam" (Arkān al-Islām). In addition, Muslims also perform other optional supererogatory acts that are encouraged but not considered to be duties.

=== Declaration of faith ===
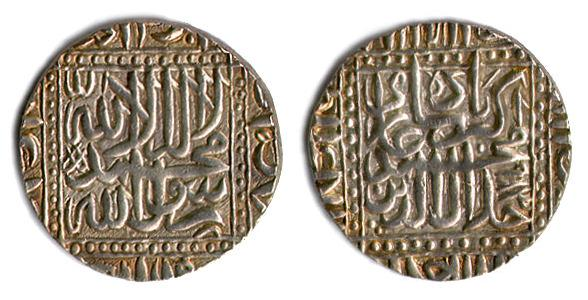
Silver coin of Akbar, the Mughal Emperor, c. 16th century, inscribed with the Shahadah

The shahadah is an oath declaring belief in Islam. The expanded statement is "ʾašhadu ʾal-lā ʾilāha ʾillā-llāhu wa ʾašhadu ʾanna muħammadan rasūlu-llāh" (أشهد أن لا إله إلا الله وأشهد أن محمداً رسول الله), or, "I testify that there is no deity except God and I testify that Muhammad is the messenger of God." Islam is sometimes argued to have a very simple creed with the shahada being the premise for the rest of the religion. Non-Muslims wishing to convert to Islam are required to recite the shahada in front of witnesses.

=== Prayer ===
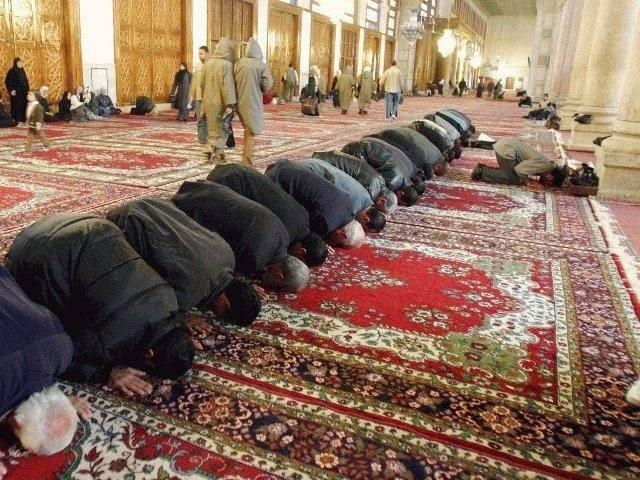
Muslim men prostrating in prayer, at the Umayyad Mosque

Prayer in Islam is called as-salah (Arabic: الصلاة), or the more Persianate word namaaz. It is seen as a personal communication with God, and consists of repeating units called rakat that include bowing and prostrating to God. There are five timed prayers each day that are considered duties. The prayers are recited in the Arabic language and performed in the direction of the Kaaba. The act also requires a state of ritual purity achieved by means of either a routine wudu ritual wash or, in certain circumstances, a ghusl full body ritual wash.

A mosque, also called a masjid or a namazgah, is a place of worship for Muslims. Although the primary purpose of the mosque is to serve as a place of prayer, it is also an important social centre for the Muslim community. For example, the Masjid an-Nabawi ("Prophetic Mosque") in Medina, Saudi Arabia, used to also serve as a shelter for the poor. Minarets are towers used to call the adhan, a vocal call to signal the prayer time.

=== Almsgiving ===
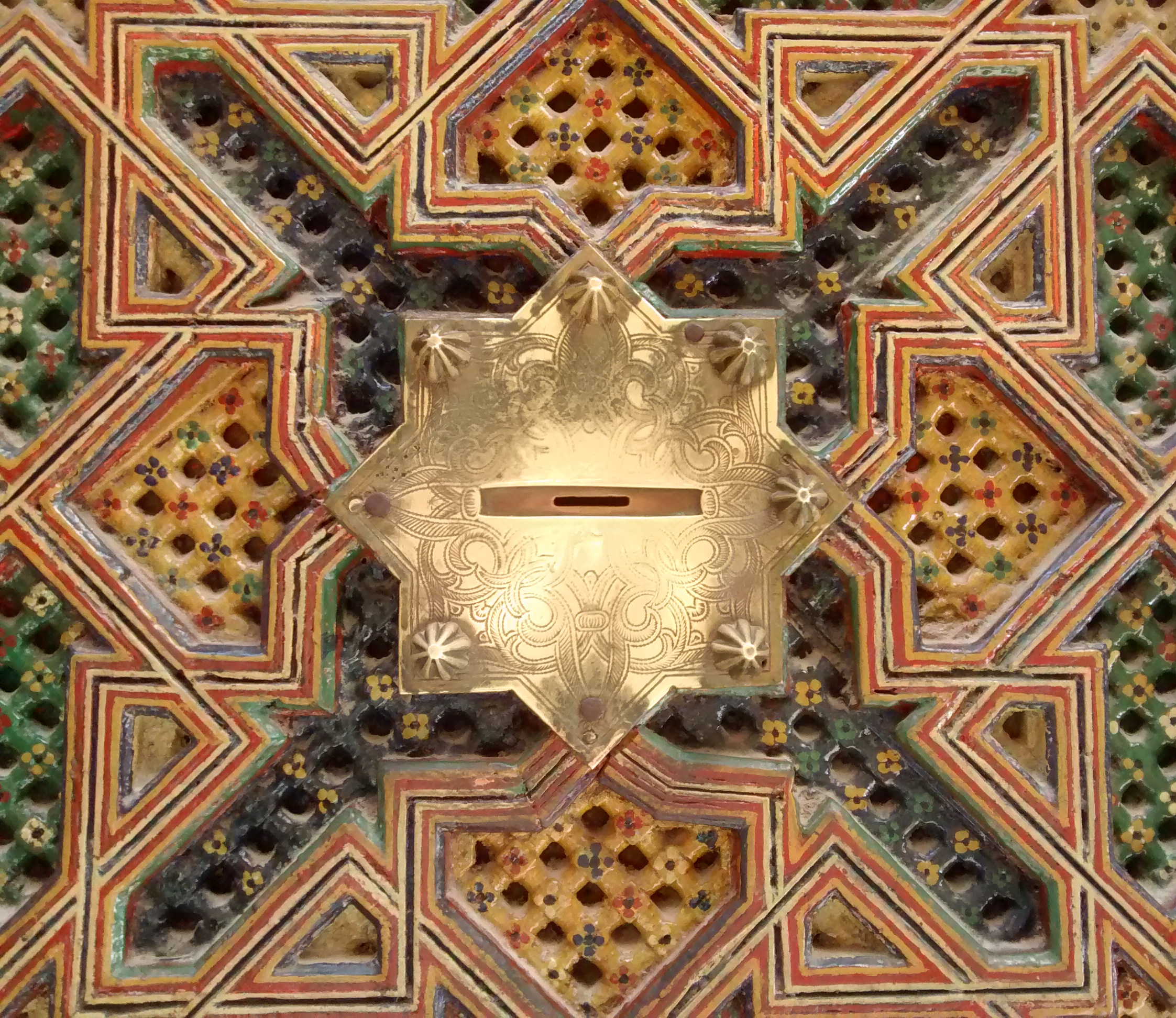
A slot for giving zakat at the Zawiya of Moulay Idris II in Fez, Morocco

Zakat (Arabic: زكاة, zakāh), also spelled Zakāt or Zakah, is a type of almsgiving characterized by the giving of a fixed portion (2.5% annually) of accumulated wealth by those who can afford it to help the poor or needy, such as for freeing captives, those in debt, or for (stranded) travellers, and for those employed to collect zakat. It acts as a form of welfare in Muslim societies. It is considered a religious obligation that the well-off owe the needy because their wealth is seen as a trust from God's bounty, and is seen as a purification of one's excess wealth. The total annual value contributed due to zakat is 15 times greater than global humanitarian aid donations, using conservative estimates. Sadaqah, as opposed to Zakat, is a much-encouraged optional charity. A waqf is a perpetual charitable trust, which finances hospitals and schools in Muslim societies.

=== Fasting ===
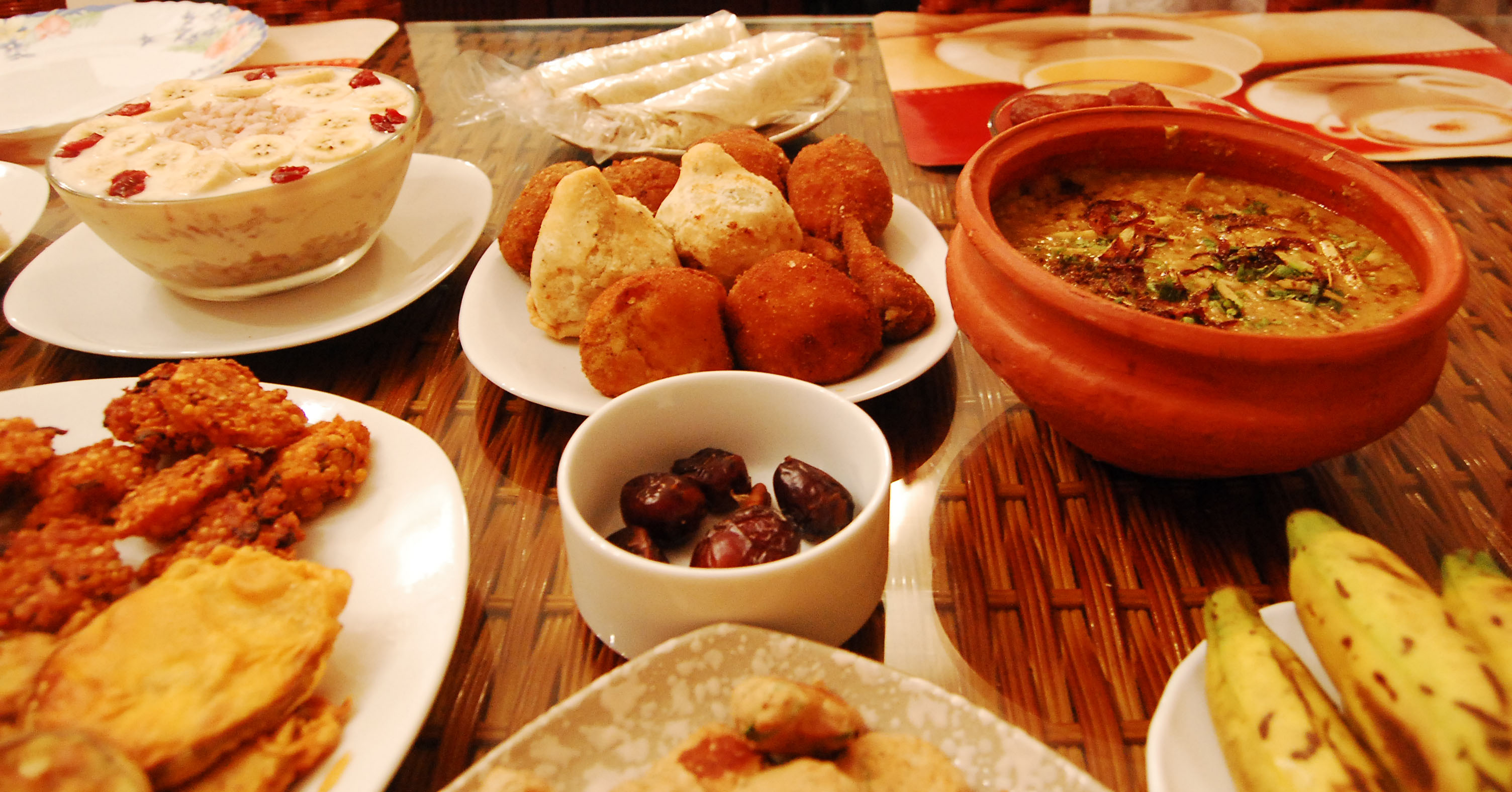
A fast-breaking feast, known as Iftar, is served traditionally with dates.

In Islam, fasting (Arabic: صوم, ṣawm) precludes food and drink, as well as other forms of consumption, such as smoking, and is performed from dawn to sunset. During the month of Ramadan, it is considered a duty for Muslims to fast. The fast is to encourage a feeling of nearness to God by restraining oneself for God's sake from what is otherwise permissible and to think of the needy. In addition, there are other days, such as the Day of Arafah, when fasting is optional.

=== Pilgrimage ===
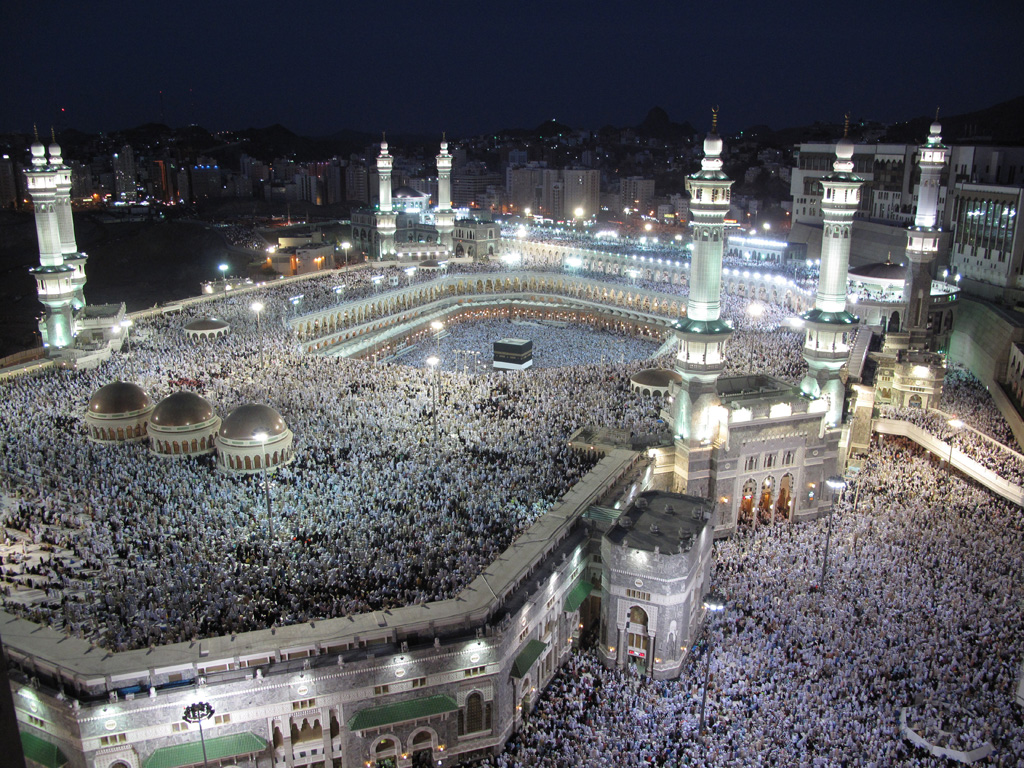
Pilgrims at the Great Mosque of Mecca during the Hajj season

The Islamic pilgrimage, called the ḥajj (Arabic: حج), is to be done at least once a lifetime by every Muslim with the means to do so during the Islamic month of Dhu al-Hijjah. Rituals of the Hajj mostly imitate the story of the family of Abraham. In Mecca, pilgrims walk seven times around the Kaaba, which Muslims believe Abraham built as a place of worship, and they walk seven times between Mount Safa and Marwa, recounting the steps of Abraham's wife, Hagar, who was looking for water for her baby Ishmael in the desert before Mecca developed into a settlement. The pilgrimage also involves spending a day praying and worshipping in the plain of Mount Arafat as well as symbolically stoning the Devil. All Muslim men wear only two simple white unstitched pieces of cloth called ihram, intended to bring continuity through generations and uniformity among pilgrims despite class or origin. Another form of pilgrimage, Umrah, is optional and can be undertaken at any time of the year. Other sites of Islamic pilgrimage are Medina, where Muhammad died, as well as Jerusalem, a city of many Islamic prophets and the site of Al-Aqsa, which was the direction of prayer before Mecca.

=== Other acts of worship ===
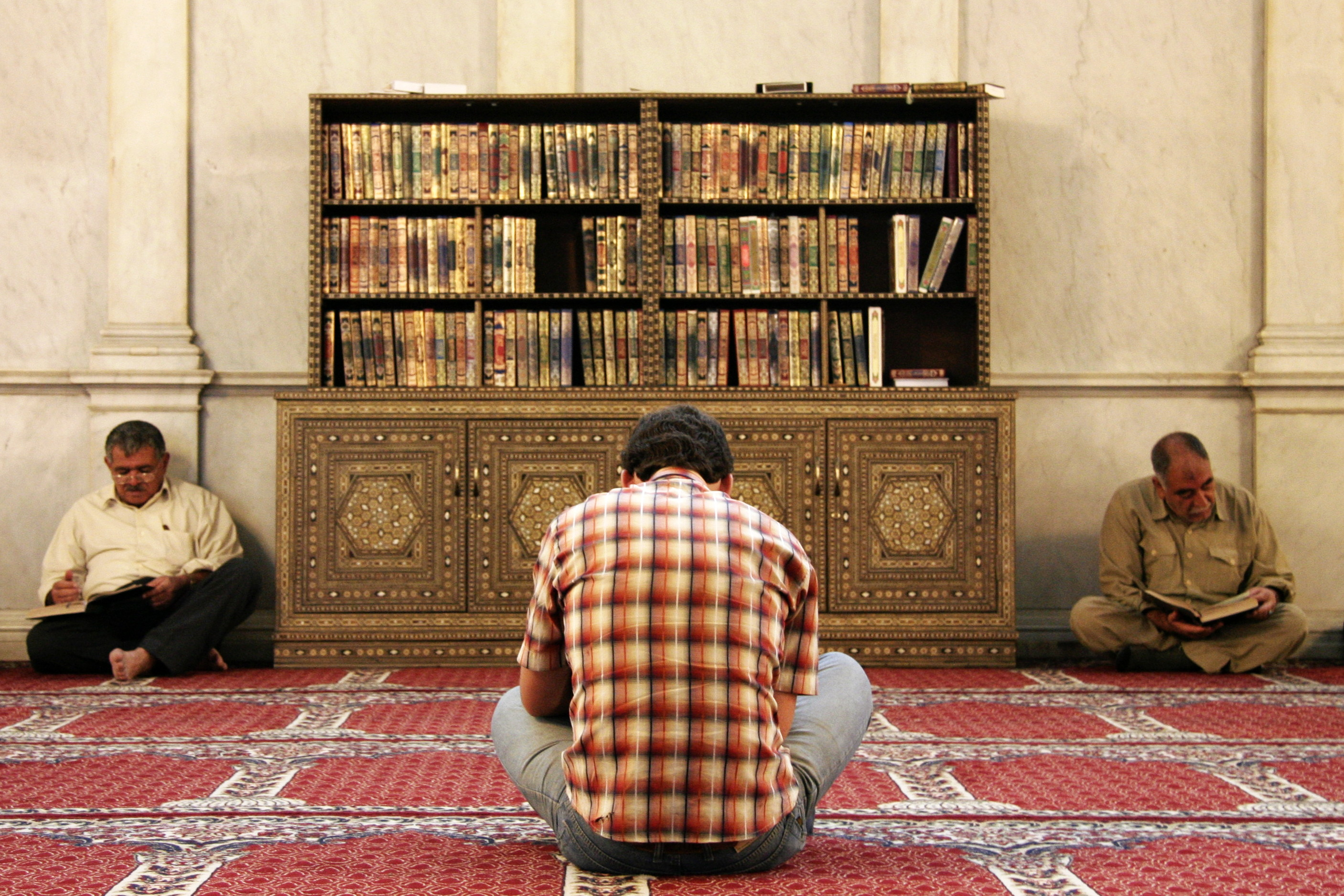
Muslim men reading the Quran in the Umayyad Mosque of Damascus

A young man reciting the Qur'an in the United States.

Al-Ikhlas
Sincerity is the Quran's 112^{th} chapter as recited by Imam Mishary Rashid Alafasy

Muslims recite and memorize the whole or parts of the Quran as acts of virtue. Tajwid refers to the set of rules for the proper elocution of the Quran. Many Muslims recite the whole Quran during the month of Ramadan. One who has memorized the whole Quran is called a hafiz ("memorizer"), and hadiths mention that these individuals will be able to intercede for others on Judgment Day.

Supplication to God, called in Arabic duʿāʾ (Arabic: دعاء IPA: [dʊˈʕæːʔ]) has its own etiquette such as raising hands as if begging.

Remembrance of God (ذكر, Dhikr') refers to phrases repeated referencing God. Commonly, this includes Tahmid, declaring praise be due to God (الحمد لله, al-Ḥamdu lillāh) during prayer or when feeling thankful, Tasbih, declaring glory to God during prayer or when in awe of something and saying 'in the name of God' (بسملة, basmalah) before starting an act such as eating.

== History ==
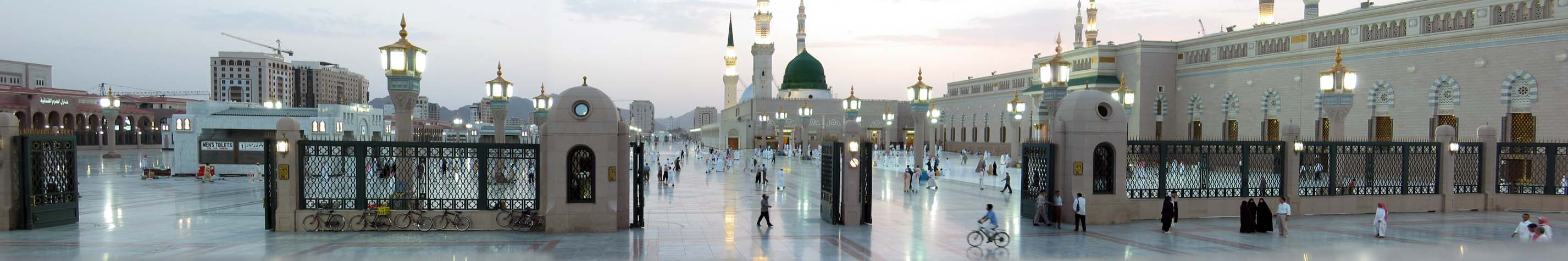
A 2004 panoramic view of Al-Masjid al-Nabawi (the Mosque of the Prophet) in Medina, present-day Saudi Arabia. It is considered the second most sacred mosque in Islam

=== Muhammad and the beginning of Islam (570–632) ===
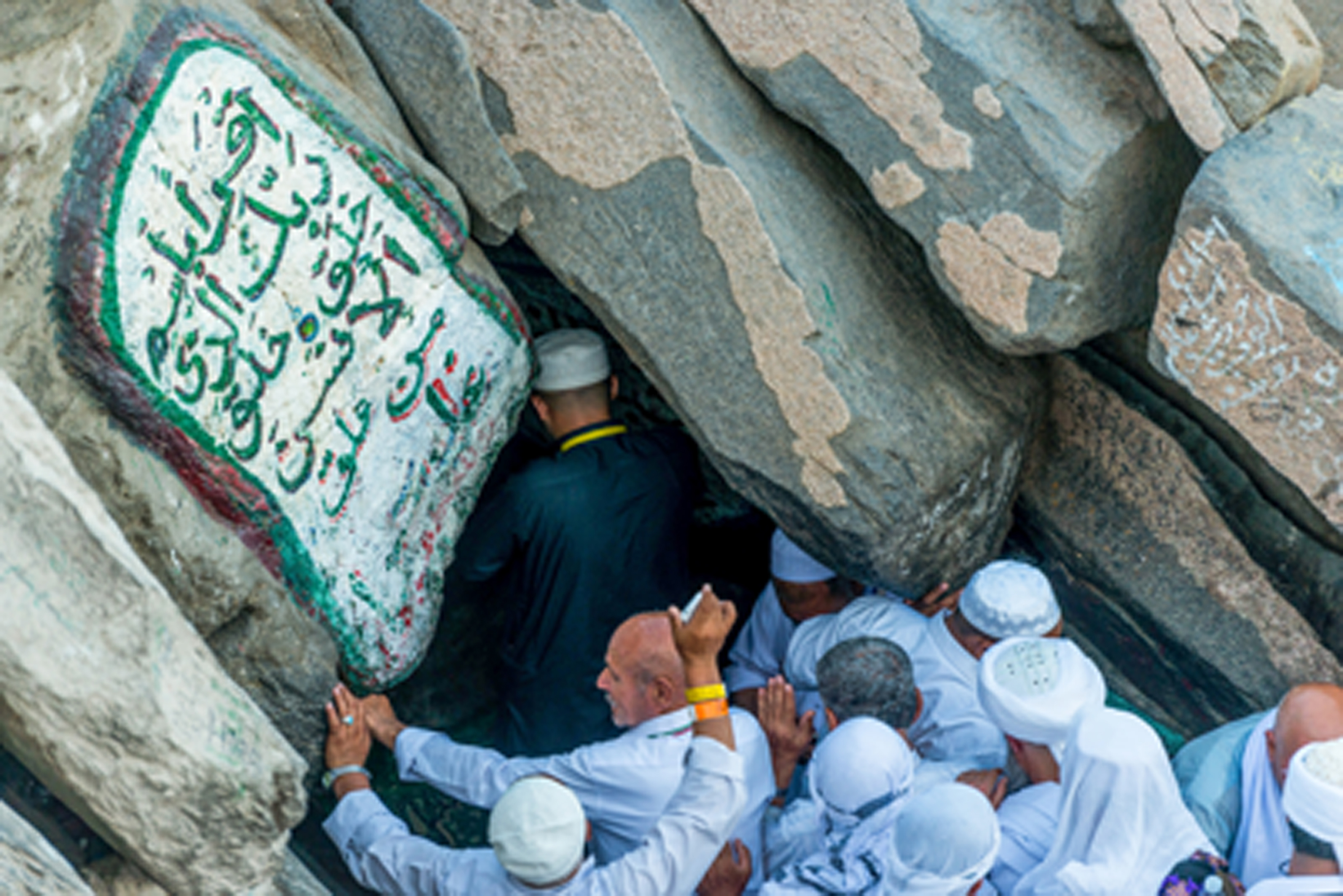
Cave of Hira

According to Islamic tradition, Muhammad was born in Mecca in 570 CE and was orphaned early in life. Growing up as a trader, he became known as the "trusted one" (Arabic: الامين) and was sought after as an impartial arbitrator. He later married his employer, the businesswoman Khadija. In the year 610 CE, troubled by the moral decline and idolatry prevalent in Mecca and seeking seclusion and spiritual contemplation, Muhammad retreated to the Cave of Hira in the mountain Jabal al-Nour, near Mecca. It was during his time in the cave that he is said to have received the first revelation of the Quran from the angel Gabriel. The event of Muhammad's retreat to the cave and subsequent revelation is known as the "Night of Power" (Laylat al-Qadr) and is considered a significant event in Islamic history. During the next 22 years of his life, from age 40 onwards, Muhammad continued to receive revelations from God, becoming the last or seal of the prophets sent to mankind.

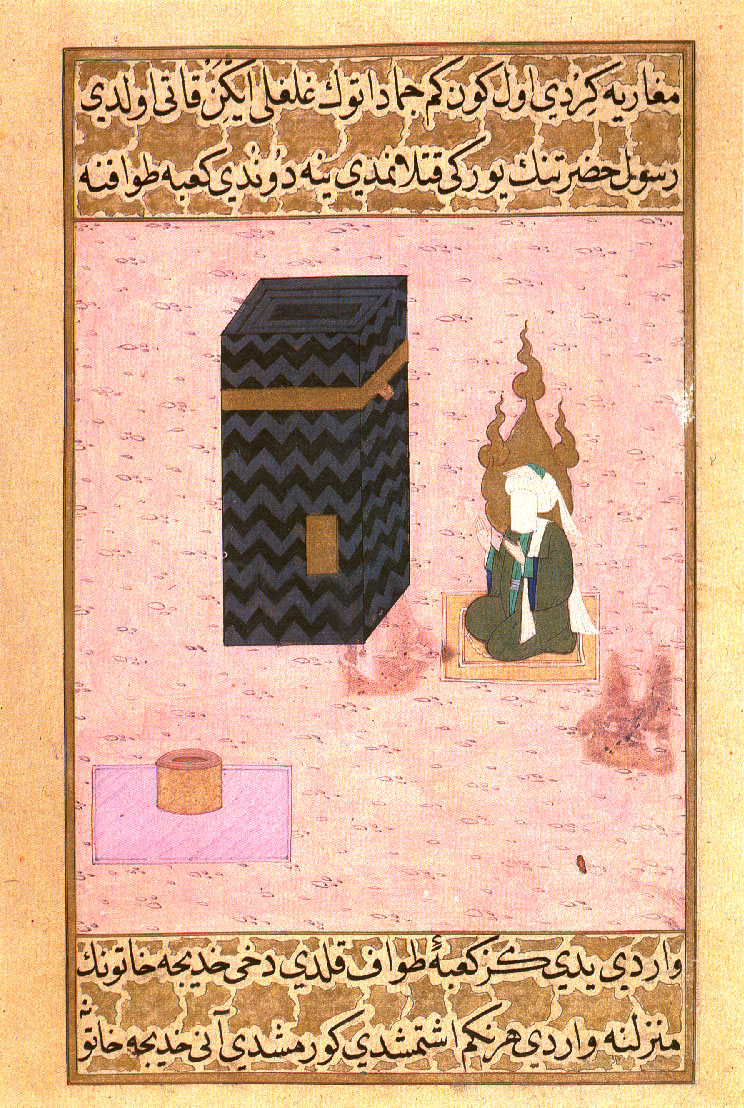
"Muhammad at the Ka'ba" from the Siyer-i Nebi. Muhammad is shown with veiled face, c. 1595.

During this time, while in Mecca, Muhammad preached first in secret and then in public, imploring his listeners to abandon polytheism and worship one God. Many early converts to Islam were women, the poor, foreigners, and slaves like the first muezzin Bilal ibn Rabah al-Habashi. The Meccan elite felt Muhammad was destabilizing their social order by preaching about one God and giving questionable ideas to the poor and slaves because they profited from the pilgrimages to the idols of the Kaaba.

After 12 years of the persecution of Muslims by the Meccans, Muhammad and his companions performed the Hijra ("emigration") in 622 to the city of Yathrib (current-day Medina). He established the first Islamic state there with the Medinan converts (the Ansar) and the Meccan migrants (the Muhajirun). The Constitution of Medina was signed by all the tribes of Medina. This established religious freedoms and freedom to use their own laws among the Muslim and non-Muslim communities as well as an agreement to defend Medina from external threats. Meccan forces and their allies lost against the Muslims at the Battle of Badr in 624 and then fought an inconclusive battle in the Battle of Uhud before unsuccessfully besieging Medina in the Battle of the Trench (March–April 627). In 628, the Treaty of Hudaybiyyah was signed between Mecca and the Muslims, but it was broken by Mecca two years later. As more tribes converted to Islam, Meccan trade routes were cut off by the Muslims. By 629 Muhammad was victorious in the nearly bloodless conquest of Mecca, and by the time of his death in 632 (at age 62) he had united the tribes of Arabia into a single religious polity.

=== Early Islamic period (632–750) ===
Expansion of Rashidun Caliphate

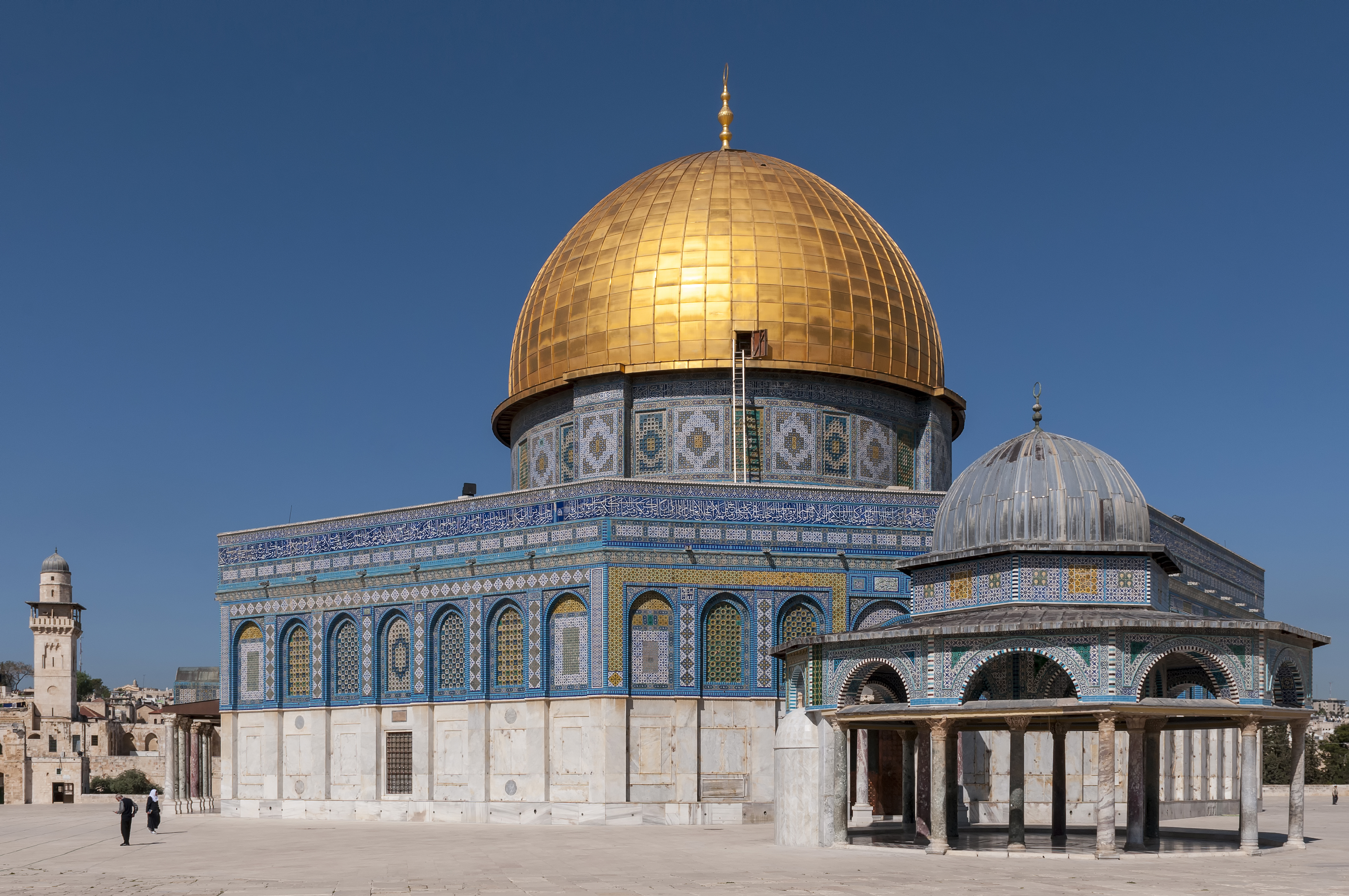
Dome of the Rock in Jerusalem built by caliph Abd al-Malik ibn Marwan; completed at the end of the Second Fitna

Muhammad died in 632 and the first successors, called Caliphs – Abu Bakr, Umar, Uthman ibn al-Affan, Ali ibn Abi Talib and sometimes Hasan ibn Ali – are known in Sunni Islam as al-khulafā' ar-rāshidūn ("Rightly Guided Caliphs"). Some tribes left Islam and rebelled under leaders who declared themselves new prophets but were crushed by Abu Bakr in the Ridda wars. Local populations of Jews and indigenous Christians, persecuted as religious minorities and heretics and taxed heavily, often helped Muslims take over their lands, resulting in rapid expansion of the caliphate into the Persian and Byzantine empires. Uthman was elected in 644 and his assassination by rebels led to Ali being elected the next Caliph. In the First Civil War, Muhammad's widow, Aisha, raised an army against Ali, attempting to avenge the death of Uthman, but was defeated at the Battle of the Camel. Ali attempted to remove the governor of Syria, Mu'awiya, who was seen as corrupt. Mu'awiya then declared war on Ali and was defeated in the Battle of Siffin. Ali's decision to arbitrate angered the Kharijites, an extremist sect, who felt that by not fighting a sinner, Ali became a sinner as well. The Kharijites rebelled and were defeated in the Battle of Nahrawan but a Kharijite assassin later killed Ali. Ali's son, Hasan ibn Ali, was elected Caliph and signed a peace treaty to avoid further fighting, abdicating to Mu'awiya in return for Mu'awiya not appointing a successor. Mu'awiya began the Umayyad dynasty with the appointment of his son Yazid I as successor, sparking the Second Civil War. During the Battle of Karbala, Husayn ibn Ali was killed by Yazid's forces; the event has been annually commemorated by Shias ever since. Sunnis, led by Ibn al-Zubayr and opposed to a dynastic caliphate, were defeated in the siege of Mecca. These disputes over leadership would give rise to the Sunni-Shia schism, with the Shia believing leadership belongs to Muhammad's family through Ali, called the ahl al-bayt. Abu Bakr's leadership oversaw the beginning of the compilation of the Quran. The Caliph Umar ibn Abd al-Aziz set up the committee, The Seven Fuqaha of Medina, and Malik ibn Anas wrote one of the earliest books on Islamic jurisprudence, the Muwatta, as a consensus of the opinion of those jurists. The Kharijites believed there was no compromised middle ground between good and evil, and any Muslim who committed a grave sin would become an unbeliever. The term "kharijites" would also be used to refer to later groups such as ISIS. The Murji'ah taught that people's righteousness could be judged by God alone. Therefore, wrongdoers might be considered misguided, but not denounced as unbelievers. This attitude came to prevail into mainstream Islamic beliefs.

The Umayyad dynasty conquered the Maghreb, the Iberian Peninsula, Narbonnese Gaul and Sindh. The Early Muslim conquests have been described as Islamic imperialism. The Umayyads struggled with a lack of legitimacy and relied on a heavily patronized military. Since the jizya tax was a tax paid by non-Muslims which exempted them from military service, the Umayyads denied recognizing the conversion of non-Arabs, as it reduced revenue. While the Rashidun Caliphate emphasized austerity, with Umar even requiring an inventory of each official's possessions, Umayyad luxury bred dissatisfaction among the pious. The Kharijites led the Berber Revolt, leading to the first Muslim states independent of the Caliphate. In the Abbasid Revolution, non-Arab converts (mawali), Arab clans pushed aside by the Umayyad clan, and some Shi'a rallied and overthrew the Umayyads, inaugurating the more cosmopolitan Abbasid dynasty in 750.

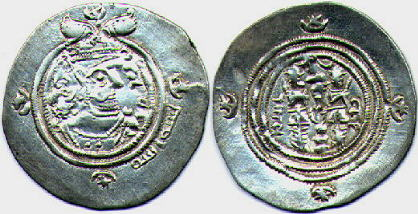
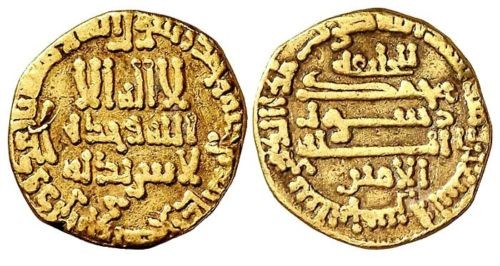
Coins of the Rashidun Caliphate (left), which feature the addition of the brief Arabic phrase Bism-Allah alongside the imagery on Sasanian coins, as well metal coins surviving from the Abbasids (right), reflect the history of the transition toward an approach in Islamic thought that strongly condemned foreign religious symbols and imagery.

=== Classical era (750–1258) ===
Al-Shafi'i codified a method to determine the reliability of hadith. During the early Abbasid era, scholars such as Muhammad al-Bukhari and Muslim ibn al-Hajjaj compiled the major Sunni hadith collections while scholars like Al-Kulayni and Ibn Babawayh compiled major Shia hadith collections. The four Sunni Madh'habs, the Hanafi, Hanbali, Maliki, and Shafi'i, were established around the teachings of Abū Ḥanīfa, Ahmad ibn Hanbal, Malik ibn Anas and al-Shafi'i. In contrast, the teachings of Ja'far al-Sadiq formed the Ja'fari jurisprudence. In the 9th century, Al-Tabari completed the first commentary of the Quran, the Tafsir al-Tabari, which became one of the most cited commentaries in Sunni Islam. Some Muslims began questioning the piety of indulgence in worldly life and emphasized poverty, humility, and avoidance of sin based on renunciation of bodily desires. Ascetics such as Hasan al-Basri inspired a movement that would evolve into tasawwuf or Sufism.

At this time, theological problems, notably on free will, were prominently tackled, with Hasan al Basri holding that although God knows people's actions, good and evil come from abuse of free will and the devil. (Note: "Hasan al Basri is often considered one of the first who rejected an angelic origin for the devil, arguing that his fall was the result of his own free-will, not God's determination. Hasan al Basri also argued that angels are incapable of sin or errors and nobler than humans and even prophets. Both early Shias and Sunnis opposed his view.) Greek rationalist philosophy influenced a speculative school of thought known as Muʿtazila, who famously advocated the notion of free-will originated by Wasil ibn Ata. Caliph Mamun al Rashid made it an official creed and unsuccessfully attempted to force this position on the majority. Caliph Al-Mu'tasim carried out inquisitions, with the traditionalist Ahmad ibn Hanbal notably refusing to conform to the Muʿtazila idea that the Quran was created rather than being eternal, which resulted in him being tortured and kept in an unlit prison cell for nearly thirty months. However, other schools of speculative theology – Māturīdism founded by Abu Mansur al-Maturidi and Ash'ari founded by Al-Ash'ari – were more successful in being widely adopted. Philosophers such as Al-Farabi, Avicenna and Averroes sought to harmonize Aristotle's ideas with the teachings of Islam, similar to later scholasticism within Christianity in Europe and Maimonides' work within Judaism, while others like Al-Ghazali argued against such syncretism and ultimately prevailed.

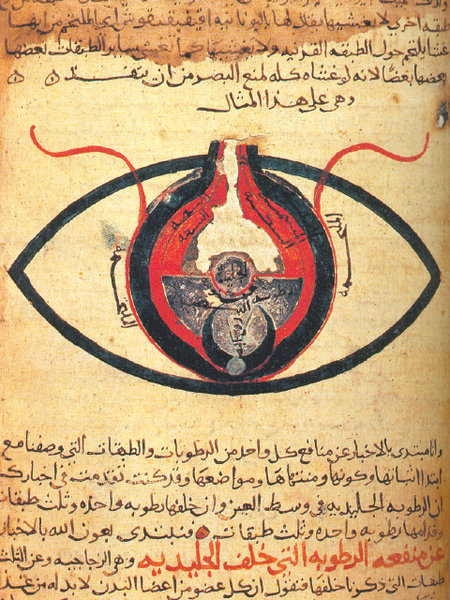
The eye, according to Hunain ibn Ishaq from a manuscript dated c. 1200

This era is sometimes called the "Islamic Golden Age". Islamic scientific achievements spanned a wide range of subject areas including medicine, mathematics, astronomy, and agriculture as well as physics, economics, engineering and optics. Avicenna was a pioneer in experimental medicine, and his The Canon of Medicine was used as a standard medicinal text in the Islamic world and Europe for centuries. Rhazes was the first to identify the diseases smallpox and measles. Public hospitals of the time issued the first medical diplomas to license doctors. Ibn al-Haytham is regarded as the father of the modern scientific method and often referred to as the "world's first true scientist", in particular regarding his work in optics. In engineering, the Banū Mūsā brothers' automatic flute player is considered to have been the first programmable machine. In mathematics, the concept of the algorithm is named after Muhammad ibn Musa al-Khwarizmi, who is considered a founder of algebra, which is named after his book al-jabr, while others developed the concept of a function. The government paid scientists the equivalent salary of professional athletes today. Guinness World Records recognizes the University of Al Karaouine, founded in 859, as the world's oldest degree-granting university. Many non-Muslims, such as Christians, Jews and Sabians, contributed to the Islamic civilization in various fields, and the institution known as the House of Wisdom employed Christian and Persian scholars to both translate works into Arabic and to develop new knowledge.

Soldiers broke away from the Abbasid empire and established their own dynasties, such as the Tulunids in 868 in Egypt and the Ghaznavid dynasty in 977 in Central Asia. In this fragmentation came the Shi'a Century, roughly between 945 and 1055, which saw the rise of the millennialist Isma'ili Shi'a missionary movement. One Isma'ili group, the Fatimid dynasty, took control of North Africa in the 10th century and another Isma'ili group, the Qarmatians, sacked Mecca and stole the Black Stone, a rock placed within the Kaaba, in their unsuccessful rebellion. Yet another Isma'ili group, the Buyid dynasty, conquered Baghdad and turned the Abbasids into a figurehead monarchy. The Sunni Seljuk dynasty campaigned to reassert Sunni Islam by promulgating the scholarly opinions of the time, notably with the construction of educational institutions known as Nizamiyyas, which are associated with al-Ghazali and Saadi Shirazi.

The expansion of the Muslim world continued with religious missions converting Volga Bulgaria to Islam. The Delhi Sultanate reached deep into the Indian subcontinent and many converted to Islam, in particular low-caste Hindus whose descendants make up the vast majority of Indian Muslims. Trade brought many Muslims to China, where they virtually dominated the import and export industry of the Song dynasty. Muslims were recruited as a governing minority class in the Yuan dynasty.

=== Pre-modern era (1258 – 18th century) ===
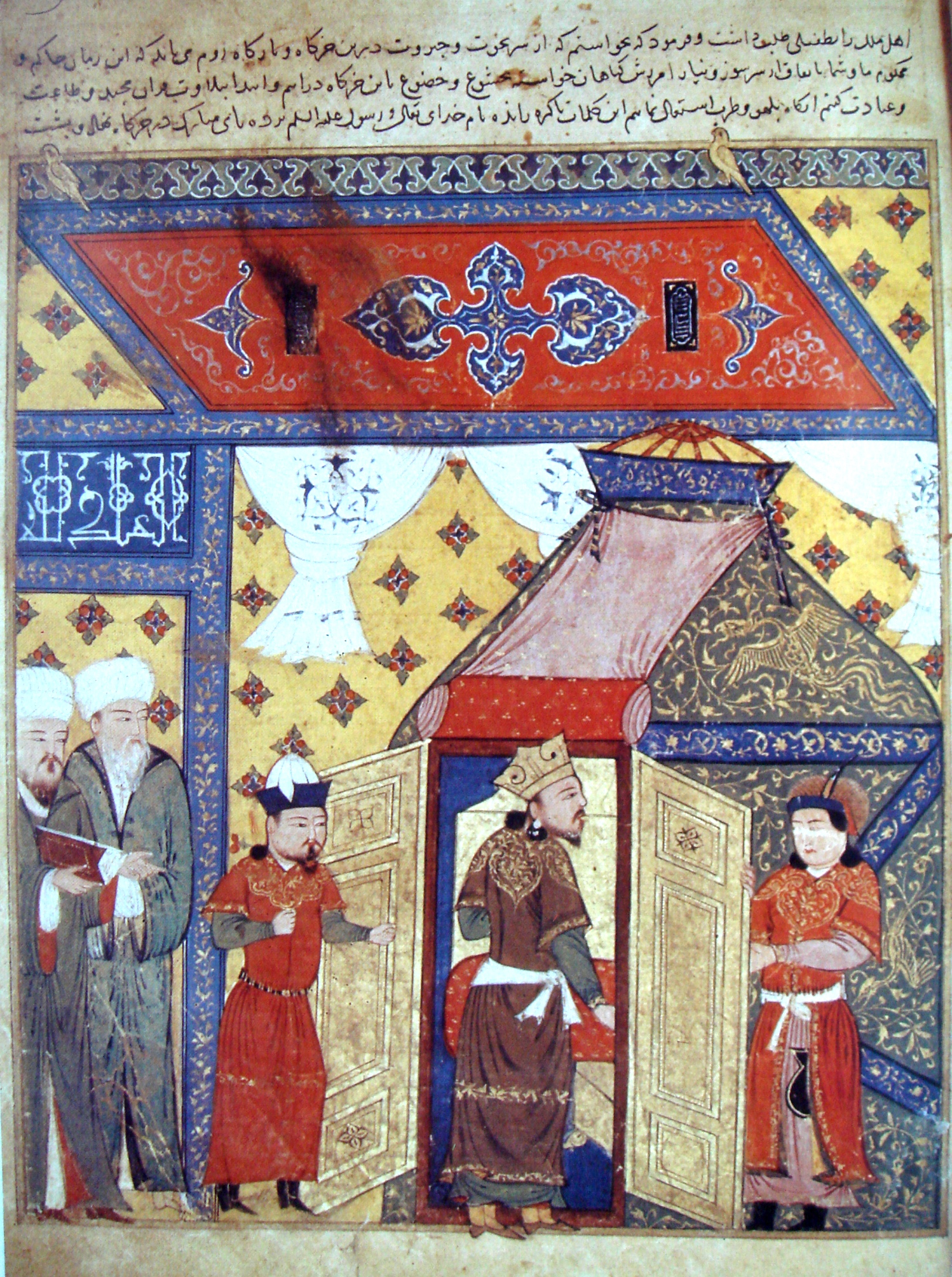
Ghazan Khan, 7^{th} Ilkhanate ruler of the Mongol Empire, converts to Islam. 14th-century depiction

Through Muslim trade networks and the activity of Sufi orders, Islam spread into new areas and Muslims assimilated into new cultures.

Under the Ottoman Empire, Islam spread to Southeast Europe. Conversion to Islam often involved a degree of syncretism, as illustrated by Muhammad's appearance in Hindu folklore. Muslim Turks incorporated elements of Turkish Shamanism beliefs to Islam. (Note: "In recent years, the idea of syncretism has been challenged. Given the lack of authority to define or enforce an Orthodox doctrine about Islam, some scholars argue there had no prescribed beliefs, only prescribed practise, in Islam before the 16th century.) Muslims in Ming Dynasty China who were descended from earlier immigrants were assimilated, sometimes through laws mandating assimilation, by adopting Chinese names and culture while Nanjing became an important centre of Islamic study.

Cultural shifts were evident with the decrease in Arab influence after the Mongol destruction of the Abbasid Caliphate. The Muslim Mongol Khanates in Iran and Central Asia benefited from increased cross-cultural access to East Asia under Mongol rule and thus flourished and developed more distinctively from Arab influence, such as the Timurid Renaissance under the Timurid dynasty. Nasir al-Din al-Tusi (1201–1274) proposed the mathematical model that was later argued to be adopted by Copernicus unrevised in his heliocentric model, and Jamshīd al-Kāshī's estimate of pi would not be surpassed for 180 years.

After the introduction of gunpowder weapons, large and centralized Muslim states consolidated around gunpowder empires, these had been previously splintered amongst various territories. The caliphate was claimed by the Ottoman dynasty of the Ottoman Empire and its claims were strengthened in 1517 as Selim I became the ruler of Mecca and Medina. The Shia Safavid dynasty rose to power in 1501 and later conquered all of Iran. In South Asia, Babur founded the Mughal Empire.

The religion of the centralized states of the gunpowder empires influenced the religious practice of their constituent populations. A symbiosis between Ottoman rulers and Sufism strongly influenced Islamic reign by the Ottomans from the beginning. The Mevlevi Order and the Bektashis had a close relation to the sultans, as Sufi-mystical as well as heterodox and syncretic approaches to Islam flourished. The often forceful Safavid conversion of Iran to the Twelver Shia Islam of the Safavid Empire ensured the final dominance of the Twelver sect within Shia Islam. Persian migrants to South Asia, as influential bureaucrats and landholders, helped spread Shia Islam, forming some of the largest Shia populations outside Iran. Nader Shah, who overthrew the Safavids, attempted to improve relations with Sunnis by propagating the integration of Twelverism into Sunni Islam as a fifth madhhab, called Ja'farism, which failed to gain recognition from the Ottomans.

=== Modern era (18th–20th centuries) ===
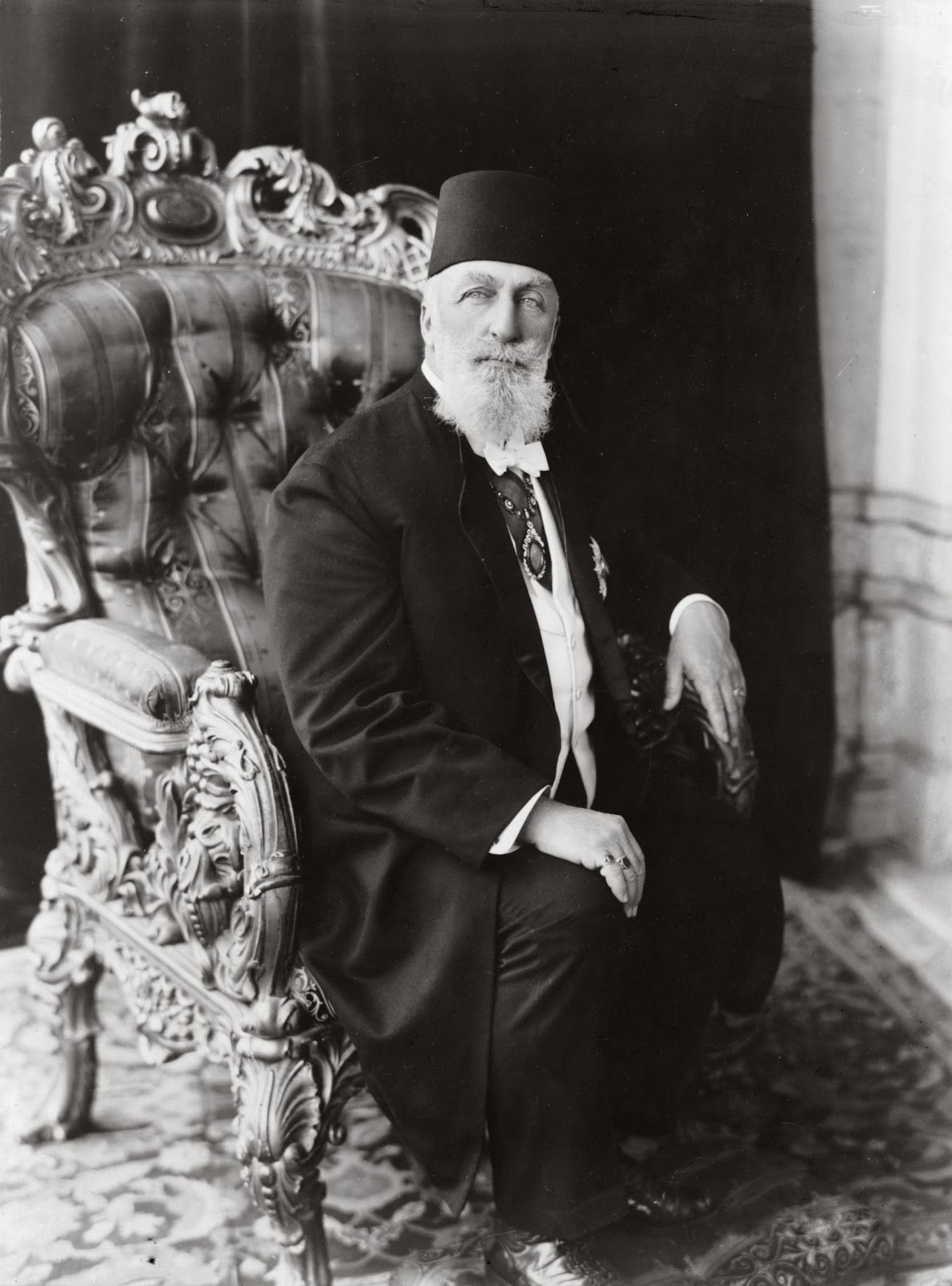
Abdülmecid II, the last Caliph from the Ottoman dynasty

Earlier in the 14th century, Ibn Taymiyya promoted a puritanical form of Islam, rejecting philosophical approaches in favor of simpler theology, and called to open the gates of itjihad rather than blind imitation of scholars. He called for a jihad against those he deemed heretics, but his writings only played a marginal role during his lifetime. During the 18th century in Arabia, Muhammad ibn 'Abd al-Wahhab, influenced by the works of Ibn Taymiyya and Ibn al-Qayyim, founded a movement called Wahhabi to return to what he saw as unadultered Islam. He condemned many local Islamic customs, such as visiting the grave of Muhammad or saints, as later innovations and sinful and destroyed sacred rocks and trees, Sufi shrines, the tombs of Muhammad and his companions and the tomb of Husayn at Karbala, a major Shia pilgrimage site. He formed an alliance with the Saud family, which, by the 1920s, completed their conquest of the area that would become Saudi Arabia. Ma Wanfu and Ma Debao promoted salafist movements in the 19th century such as Sailaifengye in China after returning from Mecca but were eventually persecuted and forced into hiding by Sufi groups. Other groups sought to reform Sufism rather than reject it, with the Senusiyya and Muhammad Ahmad both waging war and establishing states in Libya and Sudan respectively. In India, Shah Waliullah Dehlawi attempted a more conciliatory style against Sufism and influenced the Deobandi movement. In response to the Deobandi movement, the Barelwi movement was founded as a mass movement, defending popular Sufism and reforming its practices.

The Muslim world was generally in political decline starting the 1800s, especially compared to non-Muslim European powers. Earlier, in the 15th century, the Reconquista succeeded in ending the Muslim presence in Iberia. By the 19th century, the British East India Company had formally annexed the Mughal dynasty in India. As a response to Western Imperialism, many intellectuals sought to reform Islam. Islamic modernism, initially labelled by Western scholars as Salafiyya, embraced modern values and institutions such as democracy while being scripture oriented. Notable forerunners in the movement include Muhammad 'Abduh and Jamal al-Din al-Afghani. Abul A'la Maududi helped influence modern political Islam. Similar to contemporary codification, sharia was for the first time partially codified into law in 1869 in the Ottoman Empire's Mecelle code.

The Ottoman Empire dissolved after World War I, the Ottoman Caliphate was abolished in 1924 and the subsequent Sharifian Caliphate fell quickly, thus leaving Islam without a Caliph. Pan-Islamists attempted to unify Muslims and competed with growing nationalist forces, such as pan-Arabism. The Organisation of Islamic Cooperation (OIC), consisting of Muslim-majority countries, was established in 1969 after the burning of the Al-Aqsa Mosque in Jerusalem.

Contact with industrialized nations brought Muslim populations to new areas through economic migration. Many Muslims migrated as indentured servants (mostly from India and Indonesia) to the Caribbean, forming the largest Muslim populations by percentage in the Americas. Migration from Syria and Lebanon contributed to the Muslim population in Latin America. The resulting urbanization and increase in trade in sub-Saharan Africa brought Muslims to settle in new areas and spread their faith, likely doubling its Muslim population between 1869 and 1914.

=== Contemporary era (20th century–present) ===
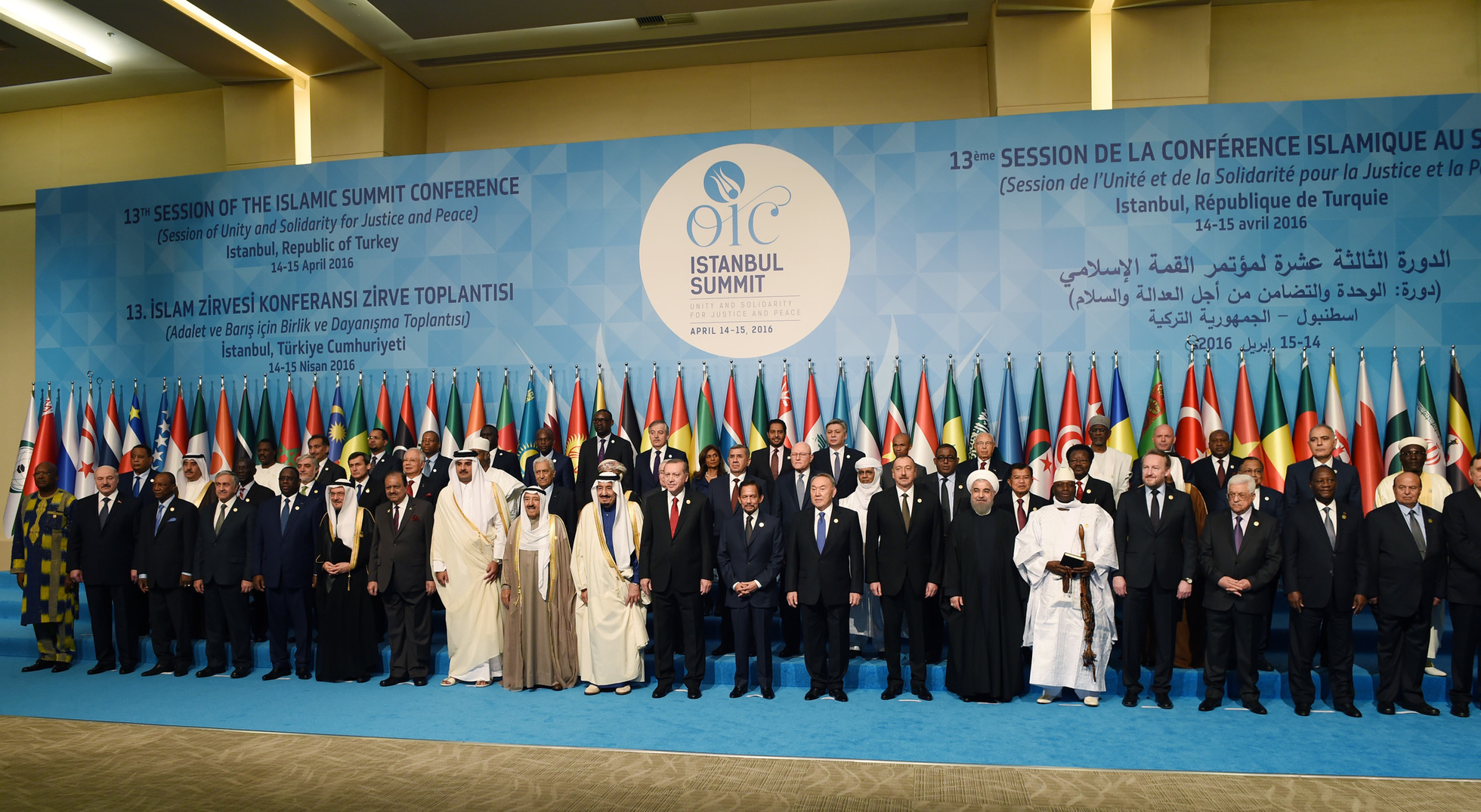
Leaders of Muslim countries during session of the Islamic Summit Conference in Istanbul, Turkey

Forerunners of Islamic modernism influenced Islamist political movements such as the Muslim Brotherhood and related parties in the Arab world, which performed well in elections following the Arab Spring, Jamaat-e-Islami in South Asia and the AK Party, which has democratically been in power in Turkey for decades. In Iran, the Iranian Revolution replaced a secular monarchy with an Islamic state. Others such as Sayyid Rashid Rida broke away from Islamic modernists and pushed against embracing what he saw as Western influence. The group Islamic State of Iraq and the Levant would even attempt to recreate the modern gold dinar as their monetary system. While some of those who broke away were quietist, others believed in violence against those opposing them, even against other Muslims.

In opposition to Islamic political movements, in 20th-century Turkey, the military carried out coups to oust Islamist governments, and headscarves were legally restricted, as also happened in Tunisia. In other places, religious authority was co-opted and is now often seen as puppets of the state. For example, in Saudi Arabia, the state monopolized religious scholarship and, in Egypt, the state nationalized Al-Azhar University, previously an independent voice checking state power. Salafism was funded in the Middle East for its quietism. Saudi Arabia campaigned against revolutionary Islamist movements in the Middle East, in opposition to Iran.

Muslim minorities of various ethnicities have been persecuted as a religious group. This has been undertaken by communist forces like the Khmer Rouge, who viewed them as their primary enemy to be exterminated since their religious practice made them stand out from the rest of the population, the Chinese Communist Party in Xinjiang and by nationalist forces such as during the Bosnian genocide. Myanmar military's Tatmadaw targeting of Rohingya Muslims has been labeled as a crime against humanity by the UN and Amnesty International, while the OHCHR Fact-Finding Mission identified genocide, ethnic cleansing, and other crimes against humanity.

The advancement of global communication has facilitated the widespread dissemination of religious knowledge. The adoption of the hijab has grown more common and some Muslim intellectuals are increasingly striving to separate scriptural Islamic beliefs from cultural traditions. Among other groups, this access to information has led to the rise of popular "televangelist" preachers, such as Amr Khaled, who compete with the traditional ulema in their reach and have decentralized religious authority. More "individualized" interpretations of Islam notably involve Liberal Muslims who attempt to align religious traditions with contemporary secular governance, an approach that has been criticized by some regarding its compatibility. Moreover, secularism is perceived as a foreign ideology imposed by invaders and perpetuated by post-colonial ruling elites, and is frequently understood to be equivalent to anti-religion.

== Demographics ==
Global percentage of adherents by religion. Muslims comprise about 25.6% of the world's population, a slightly smaller percentage than Christians.

World percentage of Muslims by country (2010)

As of 2020, about 25.6% of the global population, or about 2 billion people, are Muslims. In 1900, this estimate was 12.3%, in 1990 it was 19.9% and projections suggest the proportion will be 29.7% by 2050. A Pew study from 2020 found that the global Muslim population was the fastest-growing religious group over the decade, mainly because Muslims tend to be younger on average and have higher birth rates—two key factors driving natural population growth. According to the 2020 population estimate, 65% of the Muslim population is concentrated in ten countries, with the largest populations residing in Indonesia, Pakistan, India, Bangladesh, Nigeria, Egypt, Iran, Turkey, Sudan, and Algeria, in descending order. Indonesia is home to over 230,000,000 Muslims, Pakistan over 220,000,000, India over 210,000,000, Bangladesh over 150,000,000, Nigeria over 110,000,000, Egypt over 100,000,000, Iran and Turkey each over 80,000,000, and Sudan and Algeria each over 40,000,000.

According to a report by CNN, "Islam has drawn converts from all walks of life, most notably African-Americans". In Britain, around 6,000 people convert to Islam per year and, according to an article in the British Muslims Monthly Survey, the majority of new Muslim converts in Britain were women. According to The Huffington Post, "observers estimate that as many as 20,000 Americans convert to Islam annually", most of them being women and African-Americans.

By both percentage and total numbers, Islam is the world's fastest growing major religious group, and is projected to be the world's largest by the end of the 21st century, surpassing that of Christianity. It is estimated that, by 2050, the number of Muslims will nearly equal the number of Christians around the world, "due to the young age and high fertility rate of Muslims relative to other religious groups."

=== Pew Research Center ===
Pew Research Center estimated in 2009 that 87–90% of Muslims are Sunni and 10–13% are Shia (between 154 and 200 million Shia out of 1.57 billion Muslims as of 2009). Approximately 49 countries are Muslim-majority, with 62% of the world's Muslims living in Asia, and 683 million adherents in Indonesia, Pakistan, India, and Bangladesh alone. Arab Muslims form the largest ethnic group among Muslims in the world, followed by Bengalis and Punjabis. Most estimates indicate China has approximately 20 to 30 million Muslims (1.5% to 2% of the population). Islam in Europe is the second-largest religion after Christianity in many countries, with growth rates due primarily to immigration and higher birth rates of Muslims in 2005, accounting for 4.9% of all of Europe's population in 2016.

According to the Pew Research Center, conversion to Islam has no major net impact on the Muslim population growth as "the number of people who become Muslims through conversion seems to be roughly equal to the number of Muslims who leave the faith." Although, Islam is expected to experience a modest gain of 3 million through religious conversion between 2010 and 2050, mostly from Sub Saharan Africa (2.9 million). According to a 2020 Pew study, about 1% of adults raised Muslim leave the faith, while an equal proportion —about 1%— convert to Islam from other religions, resulting in low levels of religious switching both into and out of Islam. Ex-Muslims are more likely to convert to another religion than to become irreligious.

== Main branches or denominations ==
=== Sunni ===
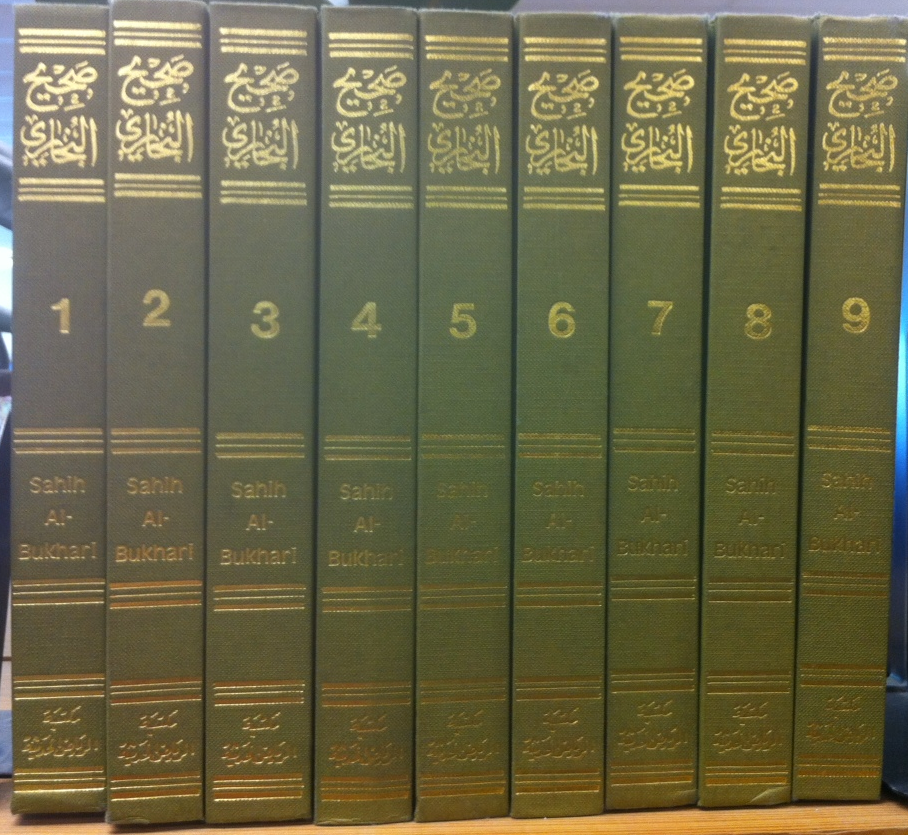
The nine volumes of Sahih Al-Bukhari, one of the six Sunni hadith books

Sunni Islam, or Sunnism, is the name for the largest denomination in Islam. The term is a contraction of the phrase "ahl as-sunna wa al-jama'at", which means "people of the sunna (the traditions of Muhammad) and the community". Sunni Islam is sometimes referred to as "orthodox Islam", though some scholars view this as inappropriate, and many non-Sunnis may find this offensive. Sunnis, or sometimes Sunnites, believe that the first four caliphs were the rightful successors to Muhammad and primarily reference six major hadith works for legal matters, while following one of the four traditional schools of jurisprudence: Hanafi, Hanbali, Maliki or Shafi'i.

Traditionalist theology is a Sunni school of thought, prominently advocated by Ahmad ibn Hanbal (780–855 CE), that is characterized by its adherence to a textualist understanding of the Quran and the sunnah, the belief that the Quran is uncreated and eternal, and opposition to speculative theology, called kalam, in religious and ethical matters. Maturidism, founded by Abu Mansur al-Maturidi (853–944 CE), asserts that scripture is not needed for basic ethics and that good and evil can be understood by reason alone, but people rely on revelation for matters beyond human comprehension. Ash'arism, founded by Al-Ashʿarī (c. 874–936), holds that ethics can derive just from divine revelation but accepts reason regarding exegetical matters and combines Muʿtazila approaches with traditionalist ideas.

While the four schools remain dominant, classical Sunni jurisprudence also recognized the Zahiri school, which rejected analogical reasoning (qiyas) in favour of a strict literal interpretation of scripture.

Salafism is a revival movement advocating the return to the practices of the earliest generations of Muslims. In the 18th century, Muhammad ibn Abd al-Wahhab led a Salafi movement, referred by outsiders as Wahhabism, in modern-day Saudi Arabia. A similar movement called Ahl al-Hadith also de-emphasized the centuries' old Sunni legal tradition, preferring to directly follow the Quran and Hadith. The Nurcu Sunni movement was initiated by Said Nursi (1877–1960); it incorporates elements of Sufism and science.

=== Shia ===
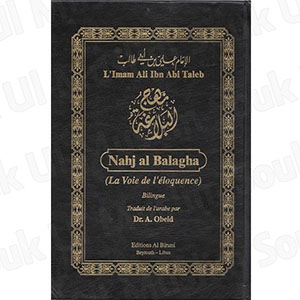
Nahj al-balagha, collection of sermons, letters, and sayings attributed to Imam Ali

Shia Islam is the second-largest Muslim denomination. Shias maintain that Muhammad's successor as leader, must be from certain descendants of Muhammad's family known as the Ahl al-Bayt and those leaders, referred to as Imams, have additional spiritual authority. Shias are guided by the Ja'fari school of jurisprudence.

According to both Sunni and Shia Muslims, a significant event took place at Ghadir Khumm during Muhammad's return from his final pilgrimage to Mecca, where he stopped thousands of Muslims in the midday heat. Muhammad appointed his cousin Ali as the executor of his last will and testament, as well as his Wali (authority). Shias recognize that Muhammad designated Ali as his successor (khalīfa) and Imam (spiritual and political leader) after him, but was prevented from succeeding Muhammad as the leader of the Muslims because of some other companions who selected Abū Bakr as caliph. Sunnis, instead believe that Muhammad did not appoint a successor before his death and consider Abū Bakr to be the first rightful caliph after Muhammad. Shias state the community deliberately ignored Ali's nomination, citing Umar's appointment by Abu Bakr, other historical evidence, and the Qur'an's stance that majority does not imply legitimacy.

Some of the first Shia Imams are revered by all Shia and Sunnis Muslims, such as Ali and Husayn. Twelvers, the largest Shia branch and most influential, believe in Twelve Imams, the last of whom went into occultation to return one day. They recognize that the prophecy of the Twelve Imams has been foretold in the Hadith of the Twelve Successors which is recorded by both Sunni and Shia sources. Zaydism rejects infallibility of Imams and were sometimes regarded a 'fifth school' of Sunni Islam rather than a Shia denomination. They differed with other Shias over the status of the fifth imam and are sometimes known as "Fivers". The Isma'ilis split with the Twelvers over who was the seventh Imam and have further fragmented into more groups over the status of successive Imams, with the largest group being the Nizaris.

For Shias, the Imam Ali Shrine in Najaf, the Imam Husayn Shrine in Karbala, and the Fatima Masumeh Shrine in Qom are also among the Islamic Holy sites.

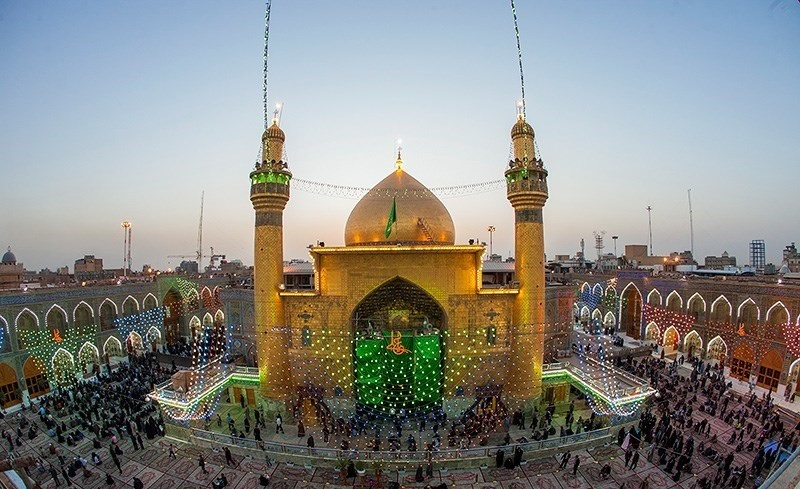
Imam Ali Shrine in Najaf, a holy site for Shia Muslims

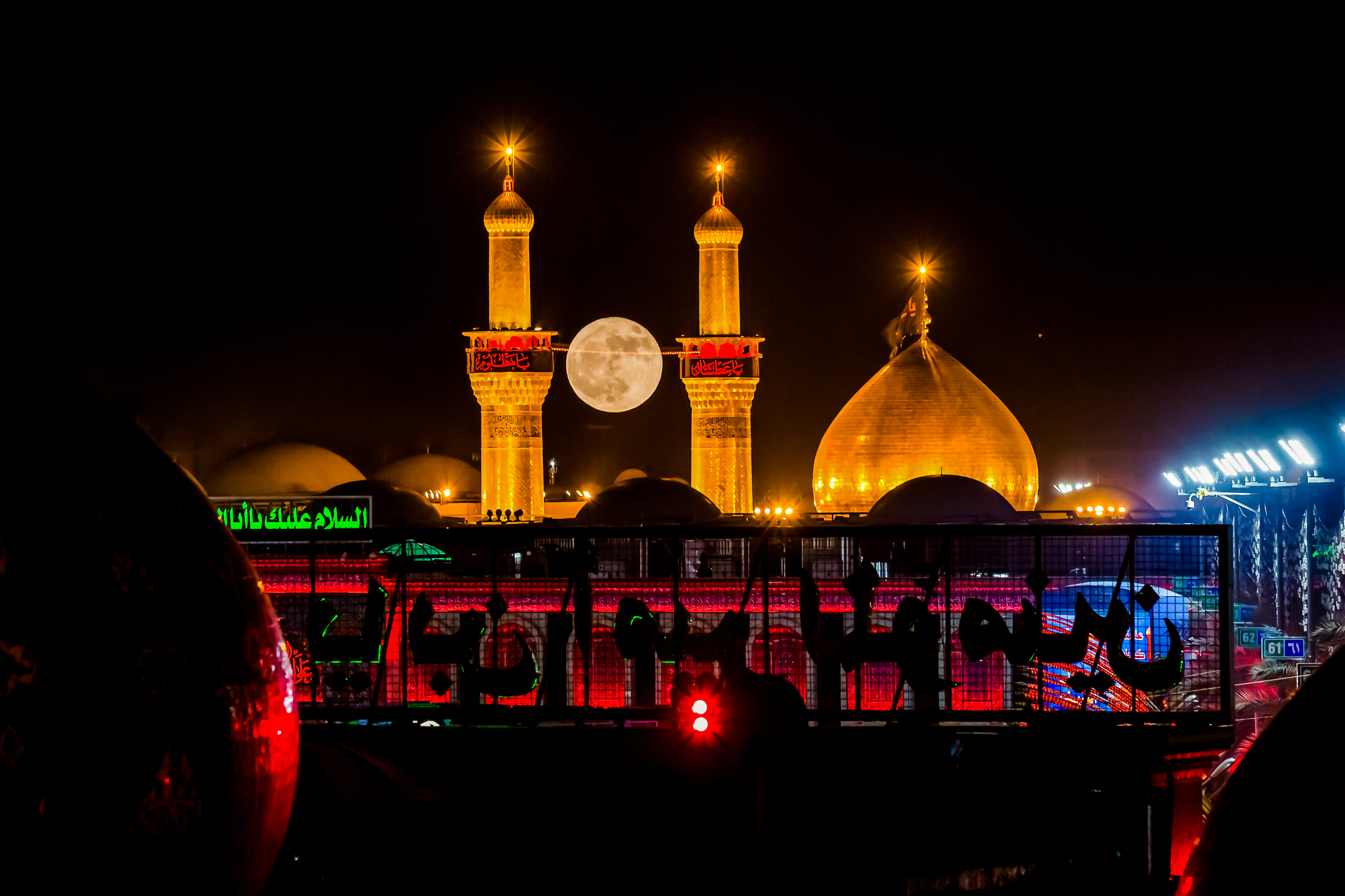
Imam Hussein Shrine in Karbala, a holy site for Shia Muslims

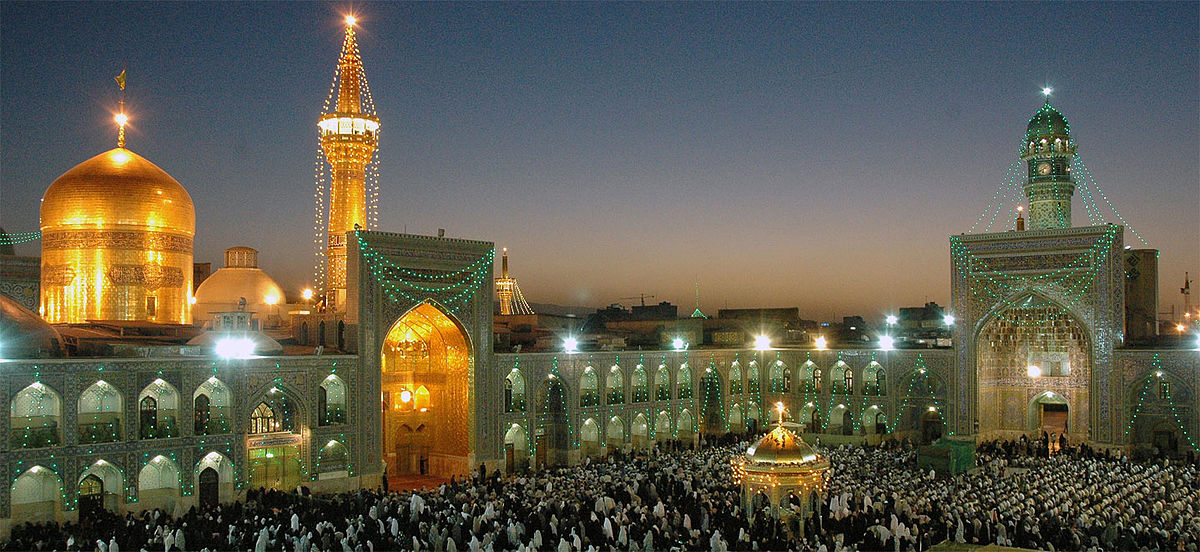
Imam Reza shrine, the world's largest mosque, in Mashhad, Iran. 25 million Shias visit the shrine each year.

=== Muhakkima ===
Ibadism is the third-largest branch of Islam whose roots go back to the Kharijite secession from the fourth Caliph, Ali. It is practised by 1.45 million Muslims around the world (~0.08% of all Muslims), most of them in Oman. Ibadism is often associated with and viewed as a moderate variation of the Kharijites, though Ibadis themselves object to this classification. The kharijites were groups that rebelled against Caliph Ali for his acceptance of arbitration with someone they viewed as a sinner. Unlike most kharijite groups, Ibadism does not regard sinful Muslims as unbelievers. Ibadi hadiths, such as the Jami Sahih collection, use chains of narrators from early Islamic history they consider trustworthy, but most Ibadi hadiths are also found in standard Sunni collections and contemporary Ibadis often approve of the standard Sunni collections.

An overview of the major sects and madhahib of Islam

=== Other denominations ===
- The Ahmadiyya Movement was founded in British India in 1889 by Mirza Ghulam Ahmad of Qadian, who claimed to be the promised Messiah ("Second Coming of Christ"), the Mahdi awaited by the Muslims as well as a "subordinate" prophet to the Islamic prophet Muhammad. There are a wide variety of distinct beliefs and teachings of Ahmadis compared to those of most other Muslims, which include the interpretation of the Quranic title Khatam an-Nabiyyin and interpretation of the Messiah's Second Coming. These perceived deviations from normative Islamic thought have resulted in rejection by most Muslims as heretics and persecution of Ahmadis in various countries, particularly Pakistan, where they have been officially declared as non-Muslims by the Government of Pakistan. The followers of the Ahmadiyya Movement in Islam are divided into two groups: the first being the Ahmadiyya Muslim Community, currently the dominant group, and the Lahore Ahmadiyya Movement for the Propagation of Islam.
- Alevism is a syncretic and heterodox local Islamic tradition, whose adherents follow the mystical (bāṭenī) teachings of Ali and Haji Bektash Veli. Alevism is a blend of traditional 14th-century Turkish beliefs, with possible syncretist origins in Shamanism and Animism alongside Shia and Sufi beliefs. It has been estimated that there are 10 million to over 20 million (~0.5–1% of all Muslims) Alevis worldwide.
- Quranism is a religious movement of Islam based on the belief that Islamic law and guidance should only be based on the Quran and not the sunnah or Hadith, with Quranists notably differing in their approach to the five pillars of Islam. The movement developed from the 19th century onwards, with thinkers like Syed Ahmad Khan, Abdullah Chakralawi and Ghulam Ahmed Perwez in India questioning the hadith tradition. In Egypt, Muhammad Tawfiq Sidqi penned the article Islam is the Quran alone in the magazine Al-Manār, arguing for the sole authority of the Quran. A prominent late 20th century Quranist was Rashad Khalifa, an Egyptian-American biochemist who claimed to have discovered a numerological code in the Quran, and founded the Quranist organization United Submitters International.
- Mu'tazilism was an early Islamic theological school known for their use of rationalism, particularly towards the two primary sources of Islam, the Qur'an and the hadith. The school was founded on five main principles: the monotheism (tawhid), divine justice, the certainty of divine promises and threats, an intermediate position regarding the status of great sinners, and the obligation to enjoin good and forbid evil. Unlike the Sunnis, Mu'tazilite rejected the traditional view that the Qur'an was the uncreated word of God, and instead held that the Qur'an was a created revelation, to affirm the absolute oneness of God. Emphasizing the use of reason, they argued that human free will allowed individuals to choose between good and evil, making them responsible for their actions. Although the Mu'tazila's influence waned due to social and political pressure from orthodox Sunnis, their rationalist legacy remains important in Islamic intellectualism.

=== Non-denominational Muslims ===
Non-denominational Muslims is an umbrella term that has been used for and by Muslims who do not belong to or do not self-identify with a specific Islamic denomination. Recent surveys report that large proportions of Muslims in some parts of the world self-identify as solely Muslim, although there is little published analysis available regarding the motivations underlying this response. Pew Research reports that respondents self-identifying as solely muslim make up a majority of Muslims in seven countries (and a plurality in three others), with the highest proportion in Kazakhstan at 74%. At least one in five Muslims in at least 22 countries self-identifies in this way.

== Mysticism ==
=== Sufism ===
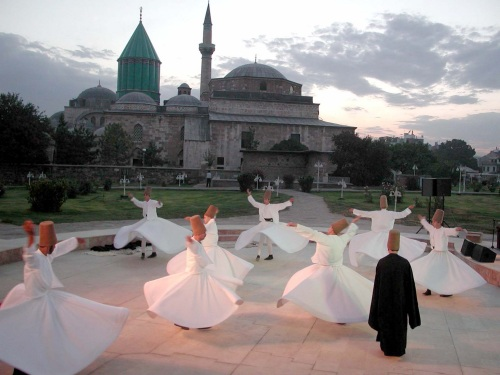
The Whirling Dervishes, or Mevlevi Order by the tomb of Sufi-mystic Rumi

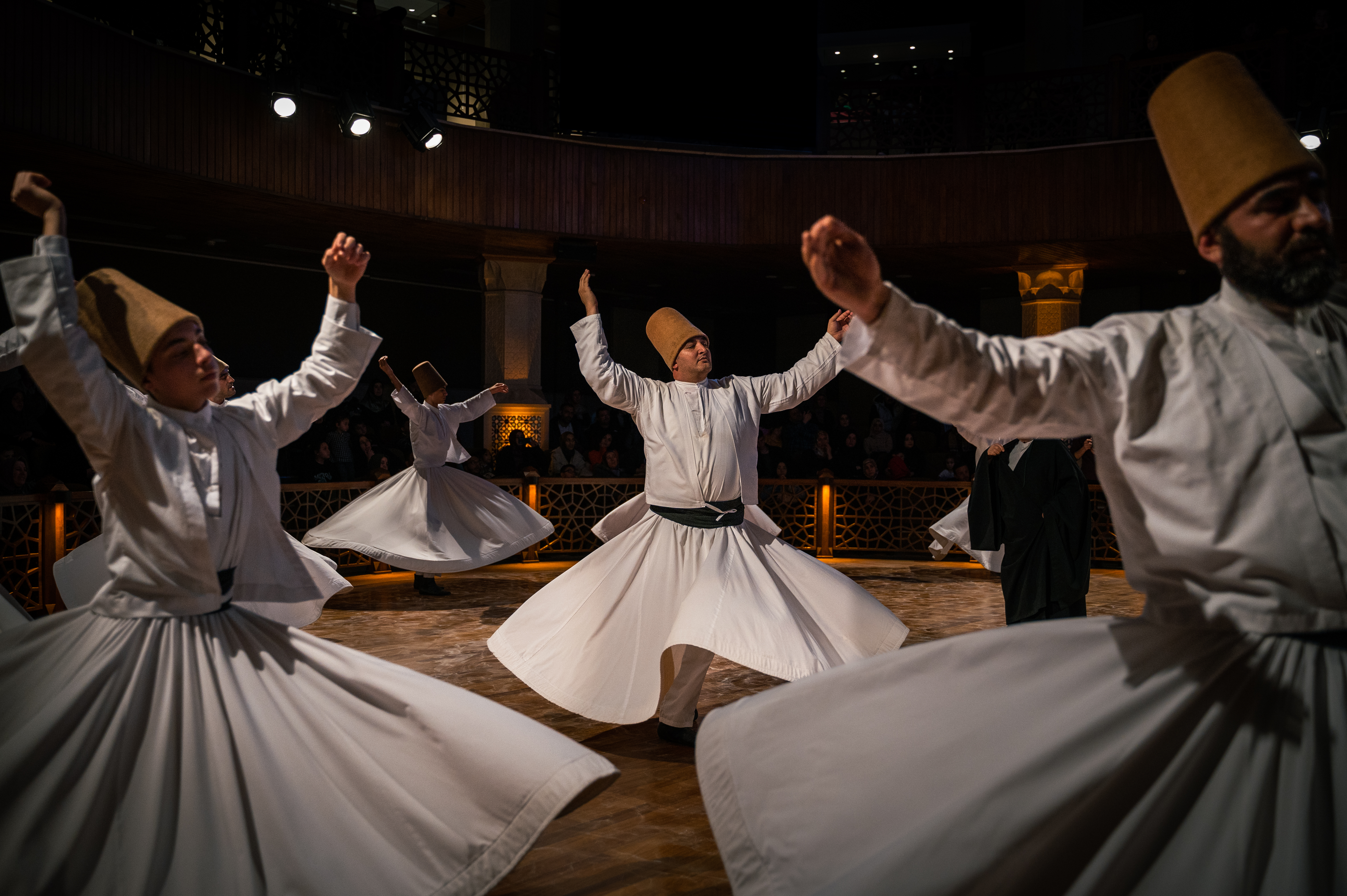
Sufism in Konya, Turkey

Sufism (Arabic: تصوف, tasawwuf), is a mystical ascetic approach to Islam that seeks to find a direct personal experience of God. Classical Sufi scholars defined tasawwuf as "a science whose objective is the reparation of the heart and turning it away from all else but God", through "intuitive and emotional faculties" that one must be trained to use. Ahmad ibn Ajiba defined tasawwuf as "a return to the tradition, and its beginning is knowledge, its middle is action [upon that knowledge], and its end is a gift [from Allah]." It is not a sect of Islam, and its adherents belong to the various Muslim denominations. Isma'ilism, whose teachings are rooted in Gnosticism and Neoplatonism as well as by the Illuminationist and Isfahan schools of Islamic philosophy, has developed mystical interpretations of Islam. Hasan al-Basri, the early Sufi ascetic often portrayed as one of the earliest Sufis, emphasized fear of failing God's expectations of obedience. In contrast, later prominent Sufis, such as Mansur Al-Hallaj and Jalaluddin Rumi, emphasized religiosity based on love towards God. Such devotion would also have an impact on the arts, with Rumi still one of the bestselling poets in America.

Sufis see tasawwuf as an inseparable part of Islam. Traditional Sufis, such as Bayazid Bastami, Jalaluddin Rumi, Haji Bektash Veli, Junaid Baghdadi, and Al-Ghazali, argued for Sufism as being based upon the tenets of Islam and the teachings of the prophet. Historian Nile Green argued that Islam in the medieval period was more or less Sufism. Followers of the Sunni revivalist movement known as Salafism have viewed popular devotional practices, such as the veneration of Sufi saints, as innovations from the original religion. Salafists have sometimes physically attacked Sufis, leading to a deterioration in Sufi–Salafi relations.

Sufi congregations form orders (tariqa) centred around a teacher (wali) who traces a spiritual chain back to Muhammad. Sufis played an important role in the formation of Muslim societies through their missionary and educational activities. The Sufism-influenced Ahle Sunnat movement or Barelvi movement claims over 200 million followers in South Asia. Sufism is prominent in Central Asia, as well as in African countries like Tunisia, Algeria, Morocco, Senegal, Chad and Niger.

== Law and jurisprudence ==
=== Sharia ===
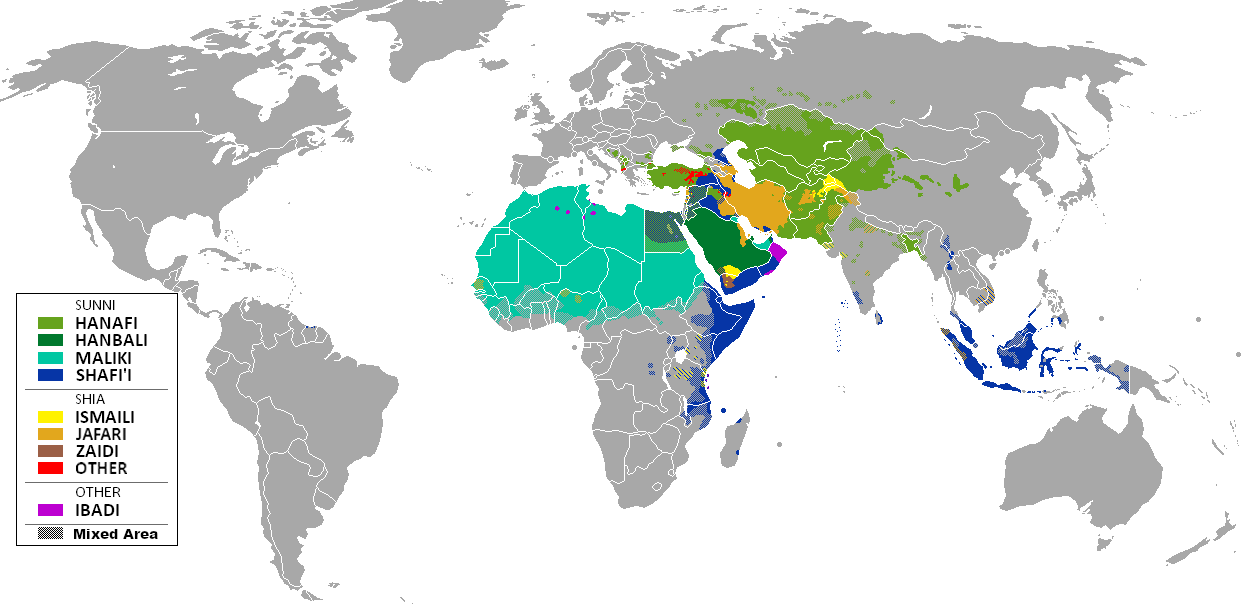
Islamic schools of law in the Muslim world

Sharia is the body of Islamic religious law. The desire to delineate and discover laws in a comprehensive and consistent method led to the development of the theory of law, called fiqh. Conversely, bid'ah is used to refer to unlawful innovations in matters of religion. Differing methodologies, called principles of fiqh or Usul al-fiqh, have developed and a school of jurisprudence arising around a methodology is known as a madhhab (Arabic: مذهب). The conformity in following of decisions by a religious expert or school is called taqlid. The term ghayr muqallid refers to those who do not use taqlid and, by extension, do not have a madhab. The practice of an individual interpreting law with independent reasoning is called ijtihad. Those who interpret shariah are known as muftis and their legal opinions are called fatwas.

The primary sources of Shariah are the Quran and Sunnah. A common third source is qiyas (analogical reasoning) which is used for legal questions not dealt with literally in the Qur’ān or Sunnah. Parallels would be searched for to find the illah, or effective cause, which is the reason behind the existing ruling. For example, from the specific prohibition of wine is deduced a broad prohibition on alcohol as they share the operative cause identified as the mind-altering nature of all alcoholic drinks. The Zahiri school adheres to strict literalism and thus rejects qiyas. Consensus of opinion is ijma, while ikhtilaf refers to scholarly disagreement. Rulings assign actions to one of five categories called ahkam: mandatory (fard), recommended (mustahabb), permitted (mubah), abhorred (makruh), and prohibited (haram).

In the modern era, sharia-based criminal laws were widely replaced by statutes inspired by European models. The Ottoman Empire's 19th-century Tanzimat reforms led to the Mecelle civil code and represented the first attempt to codify sharia. While the constitutions of most Muslim-majority states contain references to sharia, its classical rules were largely retained only in personal status (family) laws. Legislative bodies which codified these laws sought to modernize them without abandoning their foundations in traditional jurisprudence. The Islamic revival of the late 20th century brought along calls by Islamist movements for complete implementation of sharia. The role of sharia has become a contested topic around the world. There are ongoing debates as to whether sharia is compatible with secular forms of government, human rights, freedom of thought, and women's rights due to concerns including on censorship and violence.

== Society ==
=== Religious personages ===
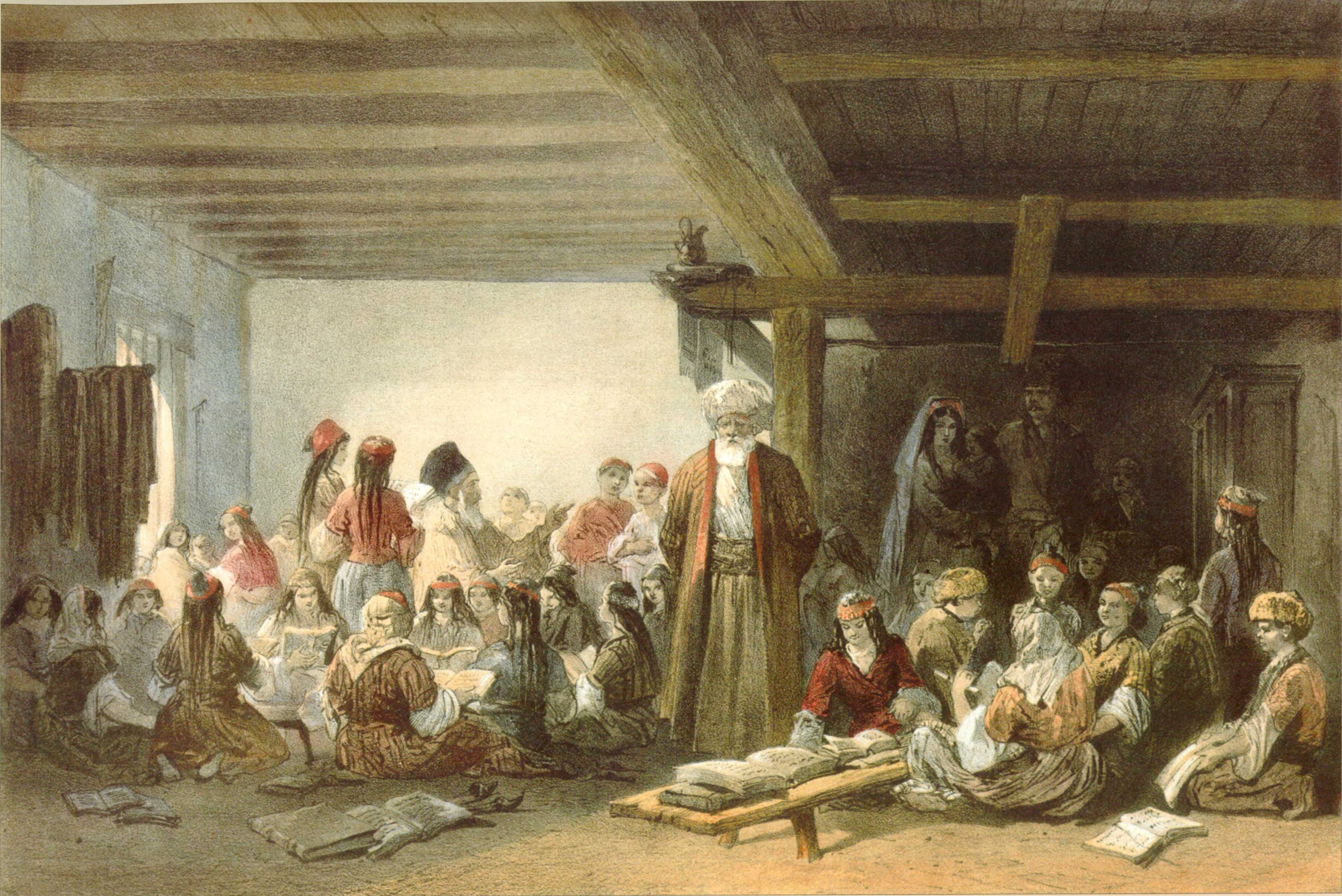
Crimean Tatar Muslim students (1856)

Islam has no clergy in the sacerdotal sense, such as priests who mediate between God and people. Imam (إمام) is the religious title used to refer to an Islamic leadership position, often in the context of conducting an Islamic worship service. Religious interpretation is presided over by the 'ulama (Arabic: علماء), a term used describe the body of Muslim scholars who have received training in Islamic studies. A scholar of the hadith is called a muhaddith, a scholar of jurisprudence is called a faqih (فقيه), a jurist who is qualified to issue legal opinions or fatwas is called a mufti, and a qadi is an Islamic judge. Honorific titles given to scholars include sheikh, mullah and mawlawi. Some Muslims also venerate saints associated with miracles (كرامات, karāmāt).

=== Governance ===
In Islamic economic jurisprudence, hoarding of wealth is reviled and thus monopolistic behavior is frowned upon. Attempts to comply with sharia has led to the development of Islamic banking. Islam prohibits riba, usually translated as usury, which refers to any unfair gain in trade and is most commonly used to mean interest. Instead, Islamic banks go into partnership with the borrower, and both share from the profits and any losses from the venture. Another feature is the avoidance of uncertainty, which is seen as gambling and Islamic banks traditionally avoid derivative instruments such as futures or options which has historically protected them from market downturns. The Rashidun and Umayyad Caliphate used to be involved in distribution of charity from the treasury, known as Bayt al-mal, before it became a largely individual pursuit around the year 720. The first Caliph, Abu Bakr, distributed zakat as one of the first examples of a guaranteed minimum income, with each citizen getting 10 to 20 dirhams annually. During the reign of the second Caliph Umar, child support was introduced and the old and disabled were entitled to stipends, while the Umayyad Caliph Umar II assigned a servant for each blind person and for every two chronically ill persons.

Jihad means "to strive or struggle [in the way of God]" and, in its broadest sense, is "exerting one's utmost power, efforts, endeavors, or ability in contending with an object of disapprobation". Shias in particular emphasize the "greater jihad" of striving to attain spiritual self-perfection while the "lesser jihad" is defined as warfare. When used without a qualifier, jihad is often understood in its military form. Jihad is the only form of warfare permissible in Islamic law and may be declared against illegal works, terrorists, criminal groups, rebels, apostates, and leaders or states who oppress Muslims. Most Muslims today interpret Jihad as only a defensive form of warfare. Jihad only becomes an individual duty for those vested with authority. For the rest of the populace, this happens only in the case of a general mobilization. For most Twelver Shias, offensive jihad can only be declared by a divinely appointed leader of the Muslim community, and as such, is suspended since Muhammad al-Mahdi's occultation in 868 CE.

=== Daily and family life ===
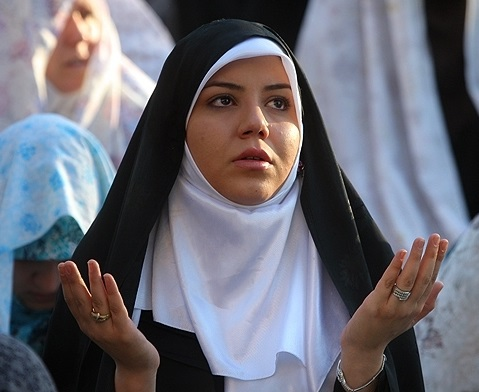
A woman wearing an Islamic veil

Many daily practices fall in the category of adab, or etiquette. Specific prohibited foods include pork products, blood and carrion. Health is viewed as a trust from God and intoxicants, such as alcoholic drinks, are prohibited. All meat must come from a herbivorous animal slaughtered in the name of God by a Muslim, Jew, or Christian, except for game that one has hunted or fished for oneself. Beards are often encouraged among men as something natural and body modifications, such as permanent tattoos, are usually forbidden as violating the creation. (Note: Some Muslims in dynastic era China resisted footbinding of girls for the same reason.) Silk and gold are prohibited for men in Islam to maintain a state of sobriety. Haya, often translated as "shame" or "modesty", is sometimes described as the innate character of Islam and informs much of Muslim daily life. For example, clothing in Islam emphasizes a standard of modesty, which has included the hijab for women. Similarly, personal hygiene is encouraged with certain requirements.

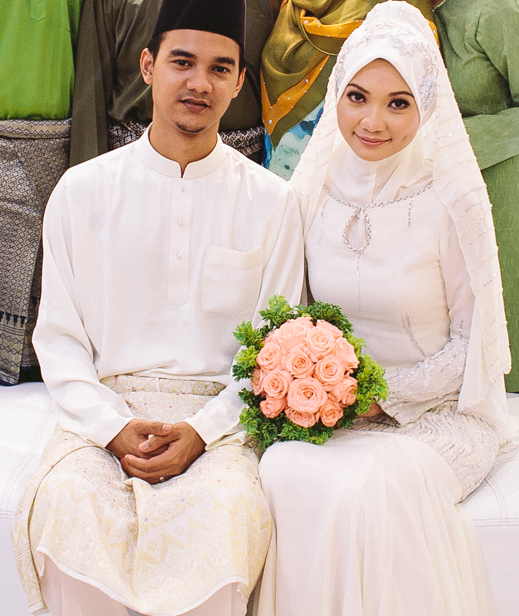
A Muslim couple

In Islamic marriage, the groom is required to pay a bridal gift (mahr). Most families in the Islamic world are monogamous. Muslim men are allowed to practice polygyny and can have up to four wives simultaneously. Islamic teachings strongly advise that if a man cannot ensure equal financial and emotional support for each of his wives, it is recommended that he marry just one woman. One reason cited for polygyny is that it allows a man to give financial protection to multiple women, who might otherwise not have any support (e.g. widows). However, the first wife can set a condition in the marriage contract that the husband cannot marry another woman during their marriage. There are also cultural variations in weddings. Polyandry, a practice wherein a woman takes on two or more husbands, is prohibited in Islam.

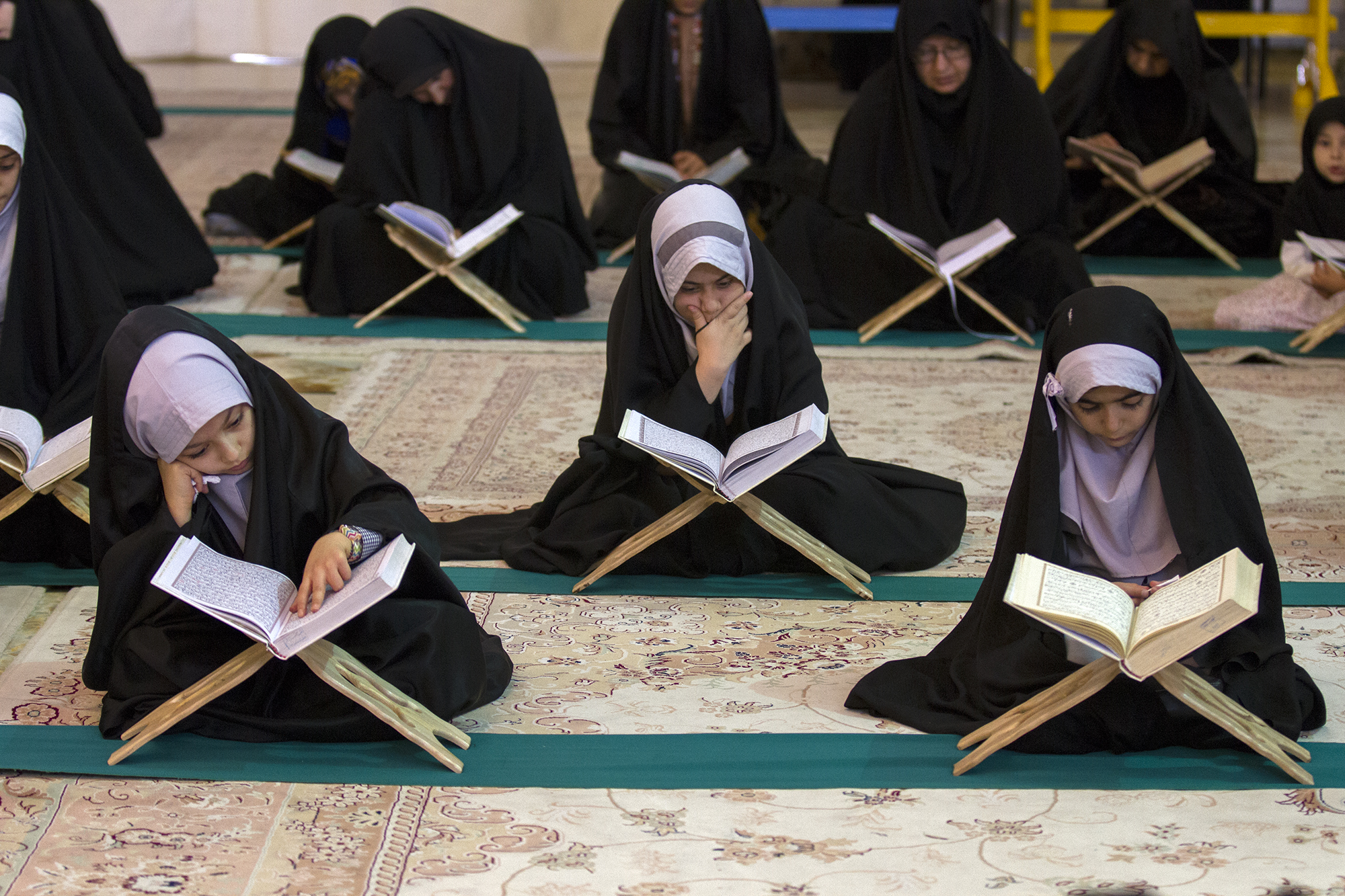
Muslim girls studying the Quran placed atop folding lecterns (rehal) during Ramadan in Qom, Iran

After the birth of a child, the adhan is pronounced in the right ear. On the seventh day, the aqiqah ceremony is performed, in which an animal is sacrificed and its meat is distributed among the poor. The child's head is shaved, and an amount of money equaling the weight of its hair is donated to the poor. Male circumcision, called khitan, is often practised in the Muslim world. Respecting and obeying one's parents, and taking care of them especially in their old age is a religious obligation.

A dying Muslim is encouraged to pronounce the Shahada as their last words. Paying respects to the dead and attending funerals in the community are considered among the virtuous acts. In Islamic burial rituals, burial is encouraged as soon as possible, usually within 24 hours. The body is washed, except for martyrs, by members of the same gender and enshrouded in a garment that must not be elaborate called kafan. A "funeral prayer" called Salat al-Janazah is performed. Wailing or loud, mournful outcrying, is discouraged. Coffins are often not preferred and graves are often unmarked, even for kings.

=== Arts and culture ===
The term "Islamic culture" can be used to mean aspects of culture that pertain to the religion, such as festivals and dress code. It is also controversially used to denote the cultural aspects of traditionally Muslim people. Finally, "Islamic civilization" may also refer to the aspects of the synthesized culture of the early Caliphates, including that of non-Muslims, sometimes referred to as "Islamicate".

Islamic art encompasses the visual arts including fields as varied as architecture, calligraphy, painting, and ceramics, among others. While the making of images of animate beings has often been frowned upon in connection with laws against idolatry, this rule has been interpreted in different ways by different scholars and in different historical periods. This stricture has been used to explain the prevalence of calligraphy, tessellation, and pattern as key aspects of Islamic artistic culture. Additionally, the depiction of Muhammad is a contentious issue among Muslims. In Islamic architecture, varying cultures show influence such as North African and Spanish Islamic architecture such as the Great Mosque of Kairouan containing marble and porphyry columns from Roman and Byzantine buildings, while mosques in Indonesia often have multi-tiered roofs from local Javanese styles.

The Islamic calendar is a lunar calendar that begins with the Hijra of 622 CE, a date that was reportedly chosen by Caliph Umar as it was an important turning point in Muhammad's fortunes. Islamic holy days fall on fixed dates of the lunar calendar, meaning they occur in different seasons in different years in the Gregorian calendar. The most important Islamic festivals are Eid al-Fitr (Arabic: عيد الفطر) on the 1st of Shawwal, marking the end of the fasting month Ramadan, and Eid al-Adha (عيد الأضحى) on the 10th of Dhu al-Hijjah, coinciding with the end of the Hajj (pilgrimage).

Cultural Muslims are religiously non-practicing individuals who still identify with Islam due to family backgrounds, personal experiences, or the social and cultural environment in which they grew up.

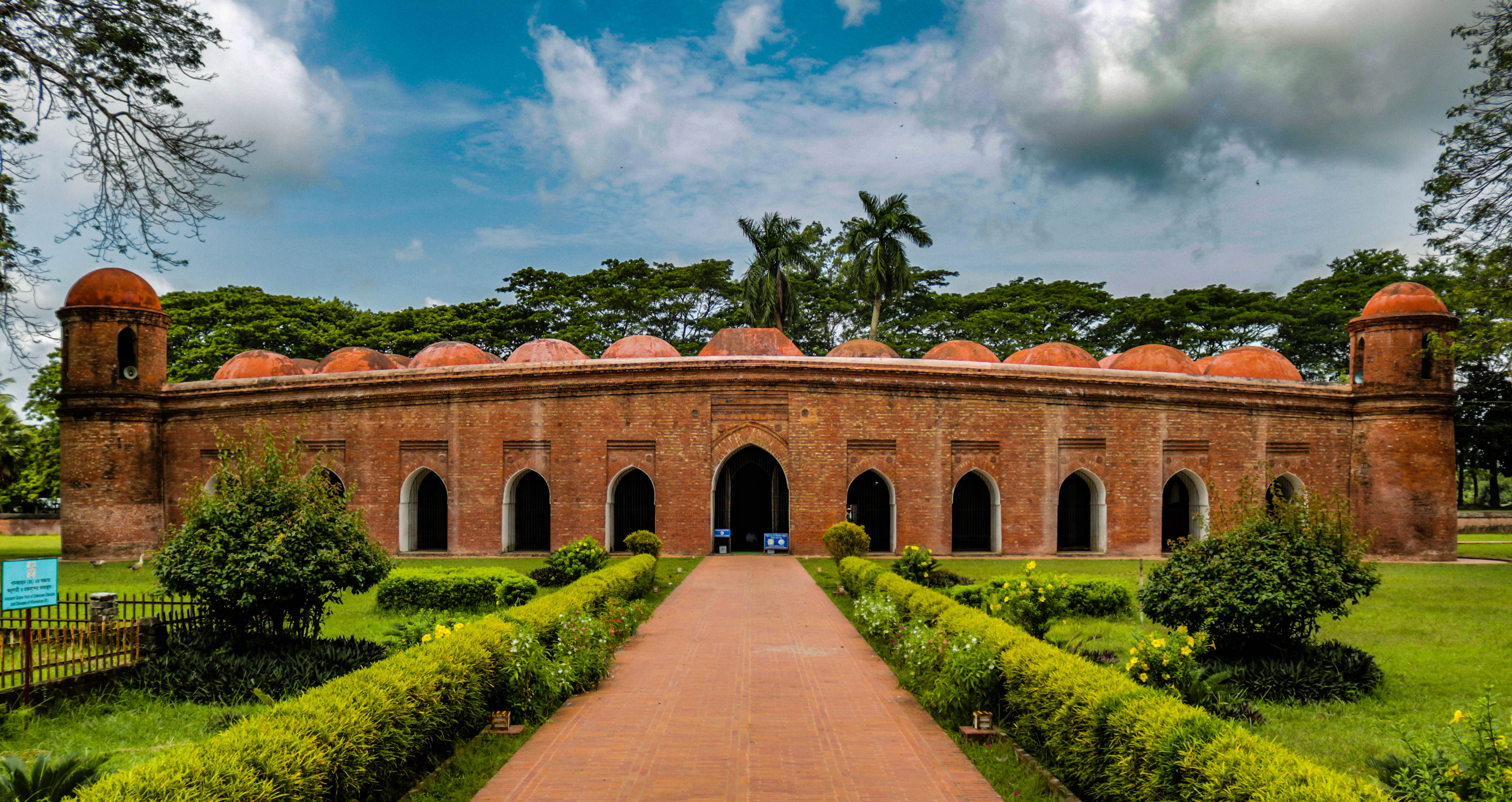
14th-century Sixty Dome Mosque, in Khalifatabad, Bangladesh

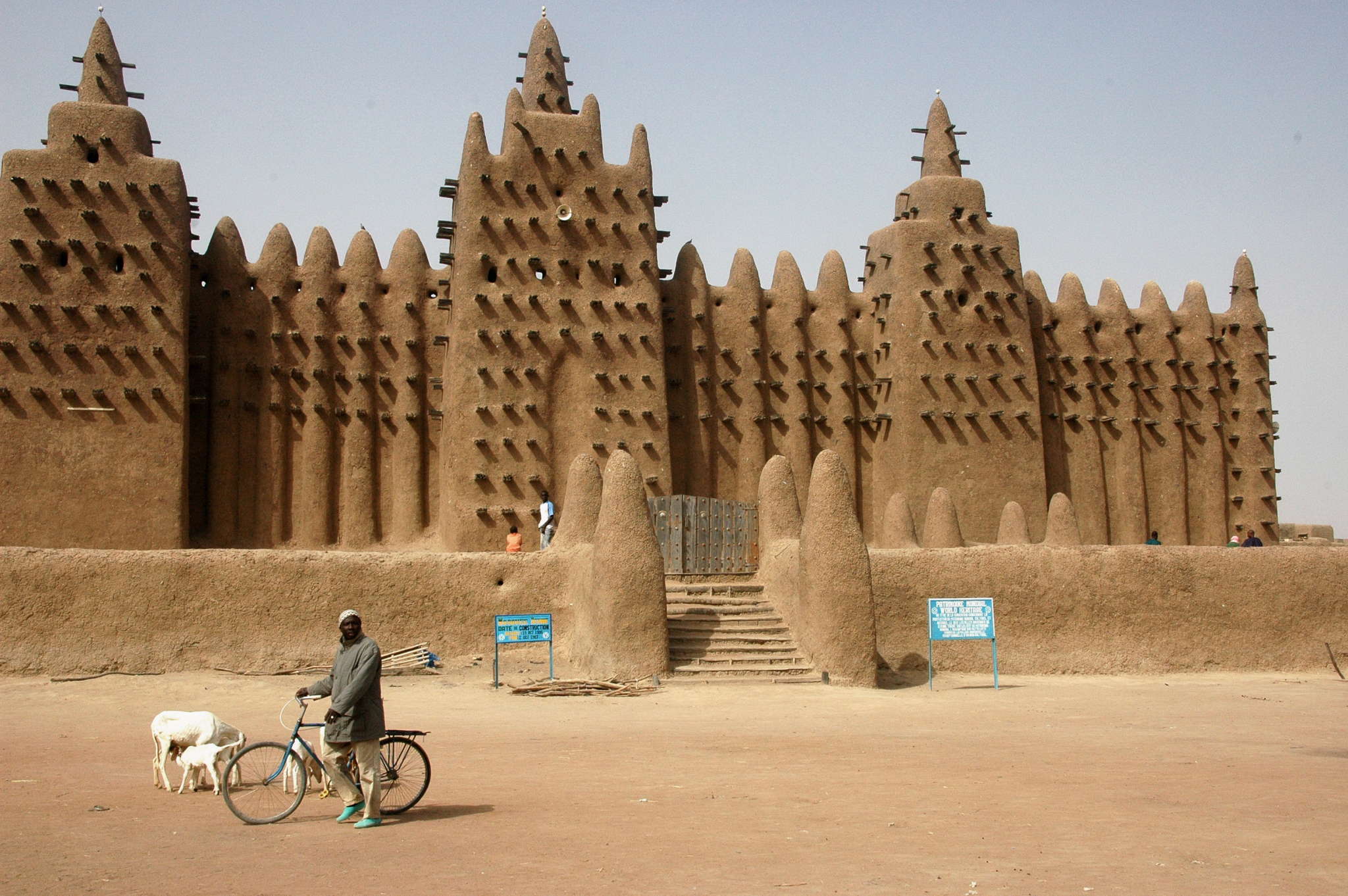
Great Mosque of Djenné, in the west African country of Mali

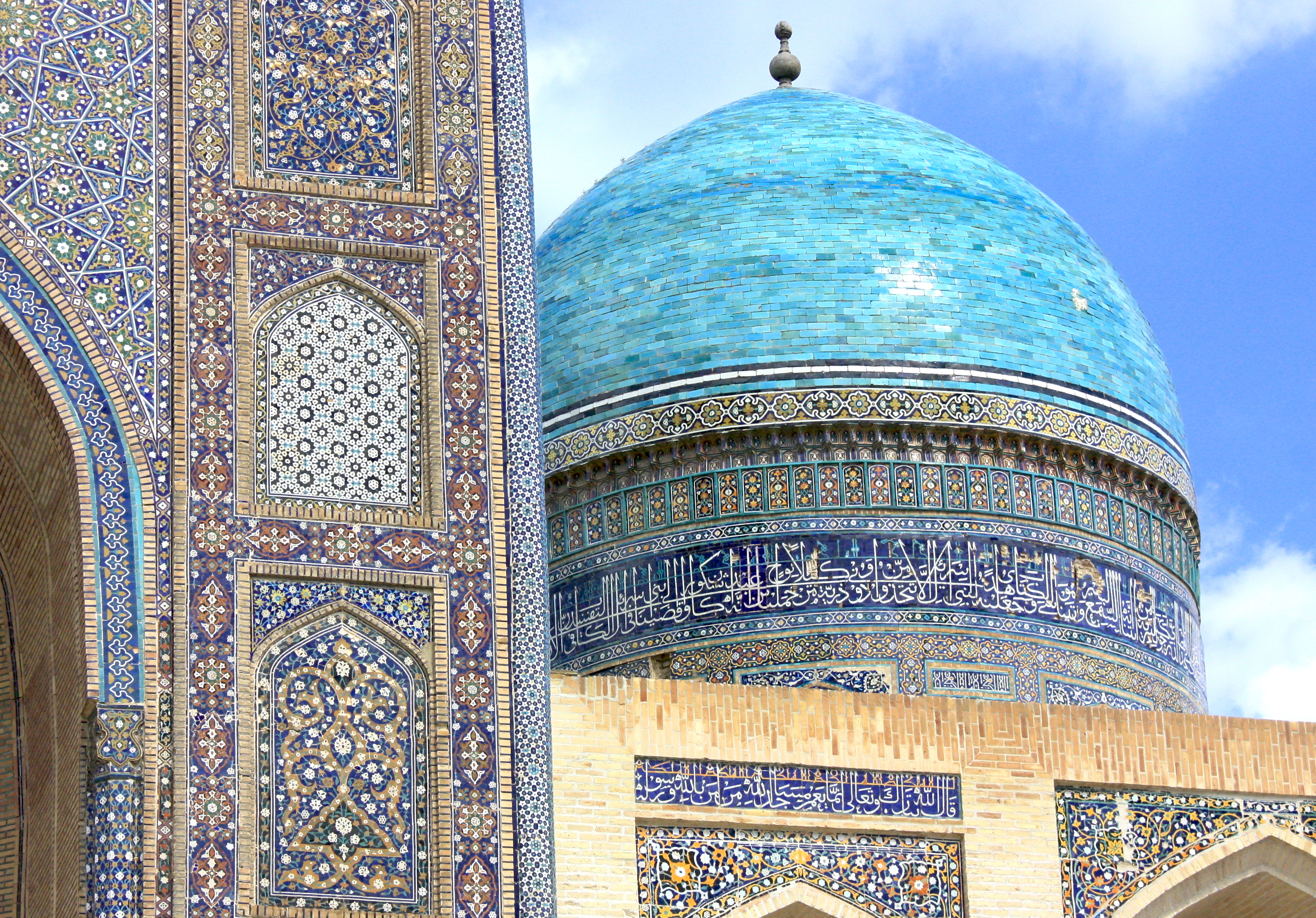
Dome in Po-i-Kalyan, Bukhara, Uzbekistan

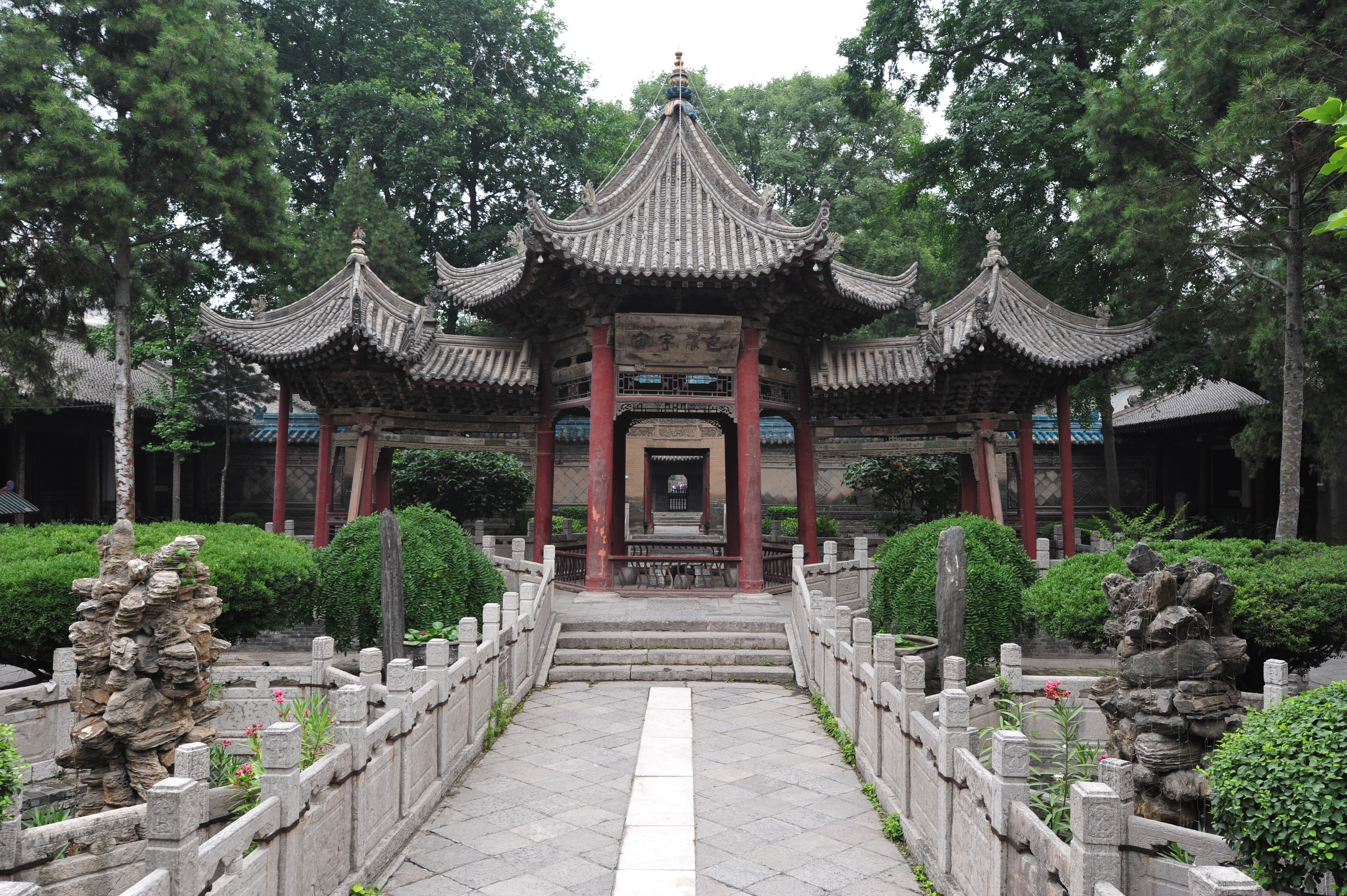
14th-century Great Mosque of Xi'an in China

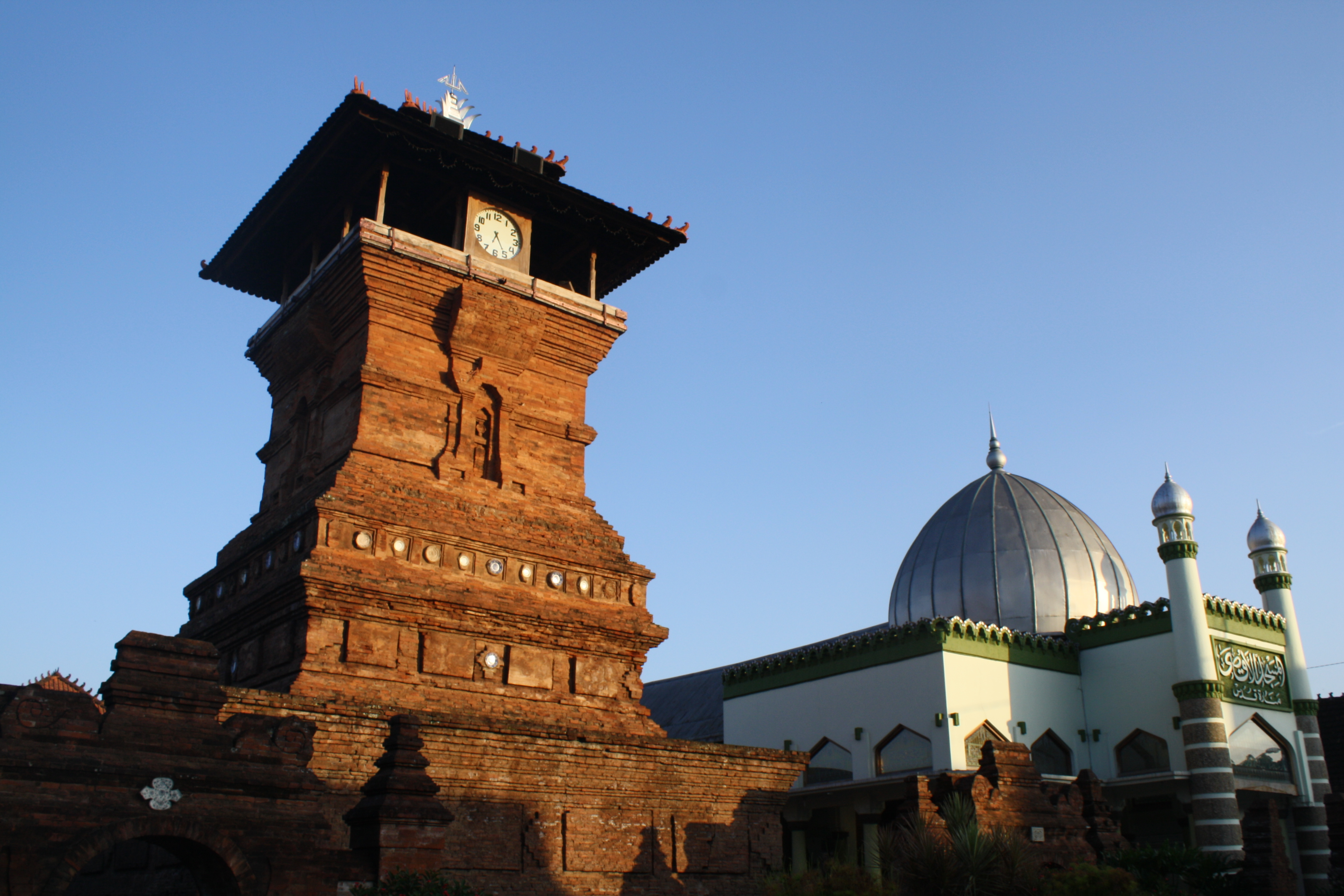
16th-century Menara Kudus Mosque in Indonesia showing Indian influence

The phrase Bismillah in an 18th-century Islamic calligraphy from the Ottoman region

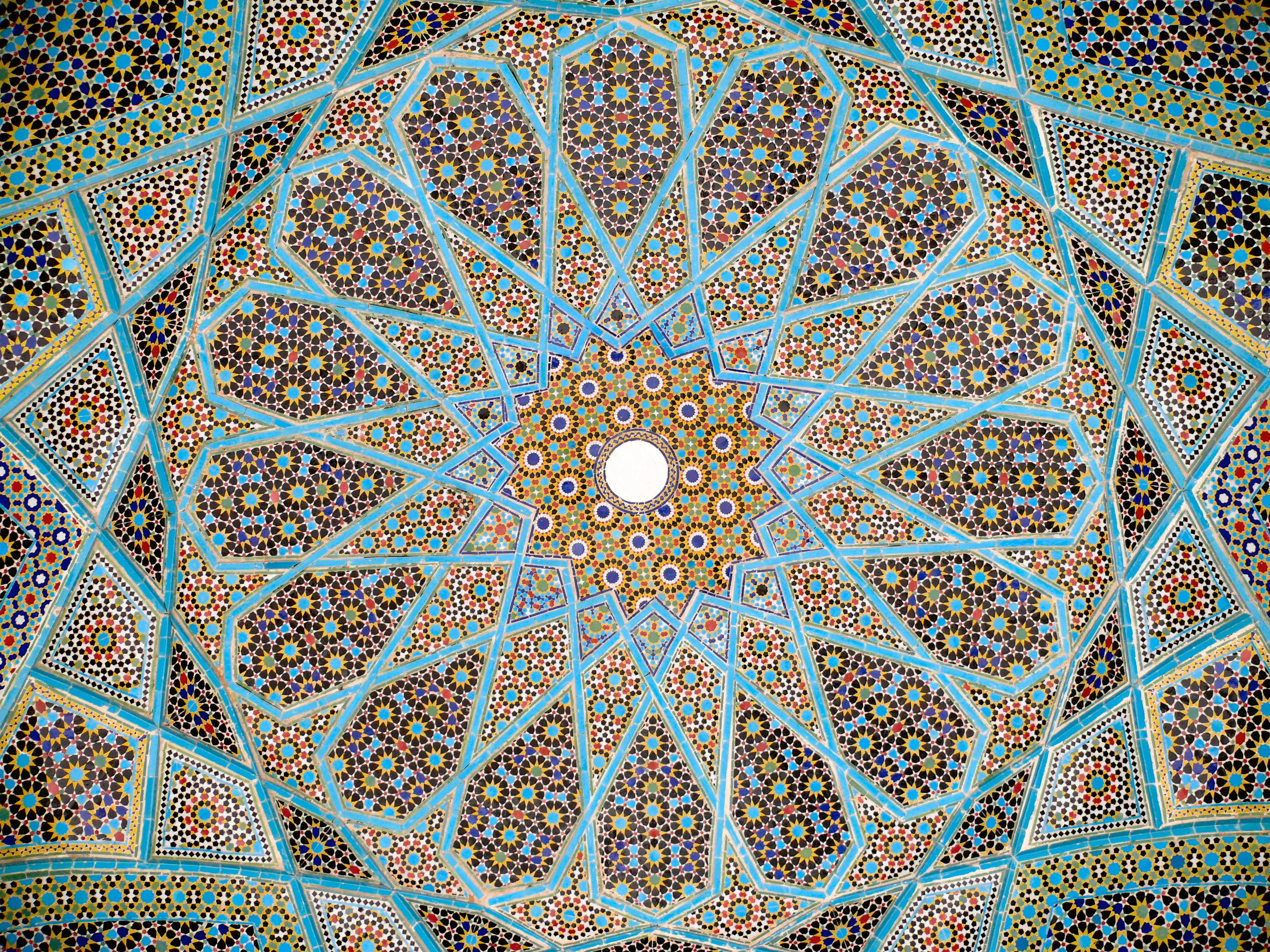
Geometric arabesque tiling on the underside of the dome of Hafiz Shirazi's tomb in Shiraz, Iran

== Islamist movements ==
Islamism is a range of religious and political ideological movements that believe that Islam should influence political systems; among the most prominent are the Khilafat Movement, Islamic revival, Islamic democracy, the Deobandi movement, the Salafi movement, among others. Its proponents believe Islam is innately political, and that Islam as a political system is superior to communism, liberal democracy, capitalism, and other alternatives in achieving a just, successful society. The advocates of Islamism, also known as "al-Islamiyyun", are usually affiliated with Islamic institutions or social mobilization movements, emphasizing the implementation of sharia, pan-Islamic political unity, and the creation of Islamic states.

== Influences on other religions ==
Whether movements such as the Druze, Berghouata and Ha-Mim, either emerged from Islam or came to share certain beliefs with Islam, and whether each is a separate religion or a sect of Islam are controversial viewpoints. The Druze faith further split from Isma'ilism as it developed its own unique doctrines, and finally separated from both Ismāʿīlīsm and Islam altogether; these include the belief that the Imam Al-Ḥākim bi-Amr Allāh was God incarnate. Yazdânism is seen as a blend of local Kurdish beliefs and Islamic Sufi doctrine introduced to Kurdistan by Sheikh Adi ibn Musafir in the 12th century. Bábism stems from Twelver Shia passed through Siyyid 'Ali Muhammad i-Shirazi al-Bab while one of his followers Mirza Husayn 'Ali Nuri Baha'u'llah founded the Baháʼí Faith. Yarsanism, Din-i Ilahi, and Ali-Illahism are considered separations from Islam. Sikhism, founded by Guru Nanak in Punjab in the late 15th century, was influenced by Islam.

== Criticism ==
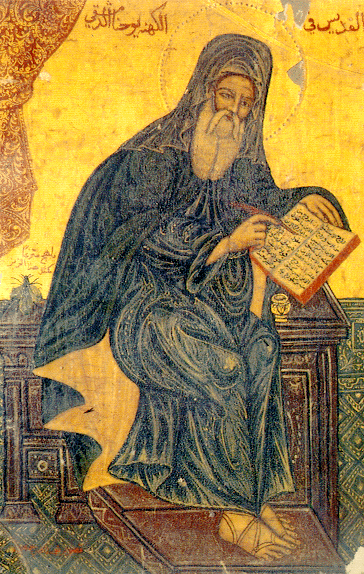
John of Damascus, under the Umayyad Caliphate, viewed Islamic doctrines as a hodgepodge from the Bible.

Criticism of Islam has existed since its formative stages. Early criticism came from Jewish authors, such as Ibn Kammuna, and Christian authors, many of whom viewed Islam as a Christian heresy or a form of idolatry, often explaining it in apocalyptic terms. Christian writers criticized Islam's sensual descriptions of paradise. Ninth-century Muslim scholar Ali ibn Sahl Rabban al-Tabari defended the Quranic description of paradise by asserting that the Bible also implies such ideas, such as drinking wine in heaven in the Gospel of Matthew. Christian 4th-century theologian Augustine of Hippo's doctrines led to the broad repudiation of bodily pleasure in both life and the afterlife.

Defamatory images of Muhammad, derived from early 7th-century depictions of the Byzantine Church, appear in the 14th-century epic poem Divine Comedy by Dante Alighieri. Here, Muhammad is depicted in the eighth circle of hell, along with Ali. Dante does not blame Islam as a whole but accuses Muhammad of schism, by establishing another religion after Christianity.

Other criticisms centre on the treatment of individuals within modern Muslim-majority countries, including issues related to human rights, particularly in relation to the application of Islamic law. Furthermore, in the wake of recent multiculturalism trends, the supposed ability of Muslim immigrants in the West to assimilate has been criticized and blamed upon Islamic backgrounds by some. A study found higher Islamic religiosity correlated with higher Islamic extremism. However, a systematic review found that personal religiosity had predominantly insignificant effects on extremist tendencies, identifying psychosocial factors—such as perceived threat, discrimination, and group deprivation—as the primary predictors.

== See also ==
- Glossary of Islam
- Index of Islam-related articles
- Islamic mythology
- Islamic studies
- Quranism
- Ban on Hadith

=== Lists ===
- List of scientists in the medieval Islamic world
- List of Islamic texts
- List of Islamic political parties
- List of Islamic apologetic works
- List of Islamic muftiates
- List of Islamic years
- List of Islamic seminaries
- List of Islamic educational institutions

=== Other ===
- Major religious groups
- Religion in pre-Islamic Arabia
- Monotheism
  - Abrahamic religions
