= Criticism of hadith =

Critique of the classical Islamic consensus on the collection and use of hadith

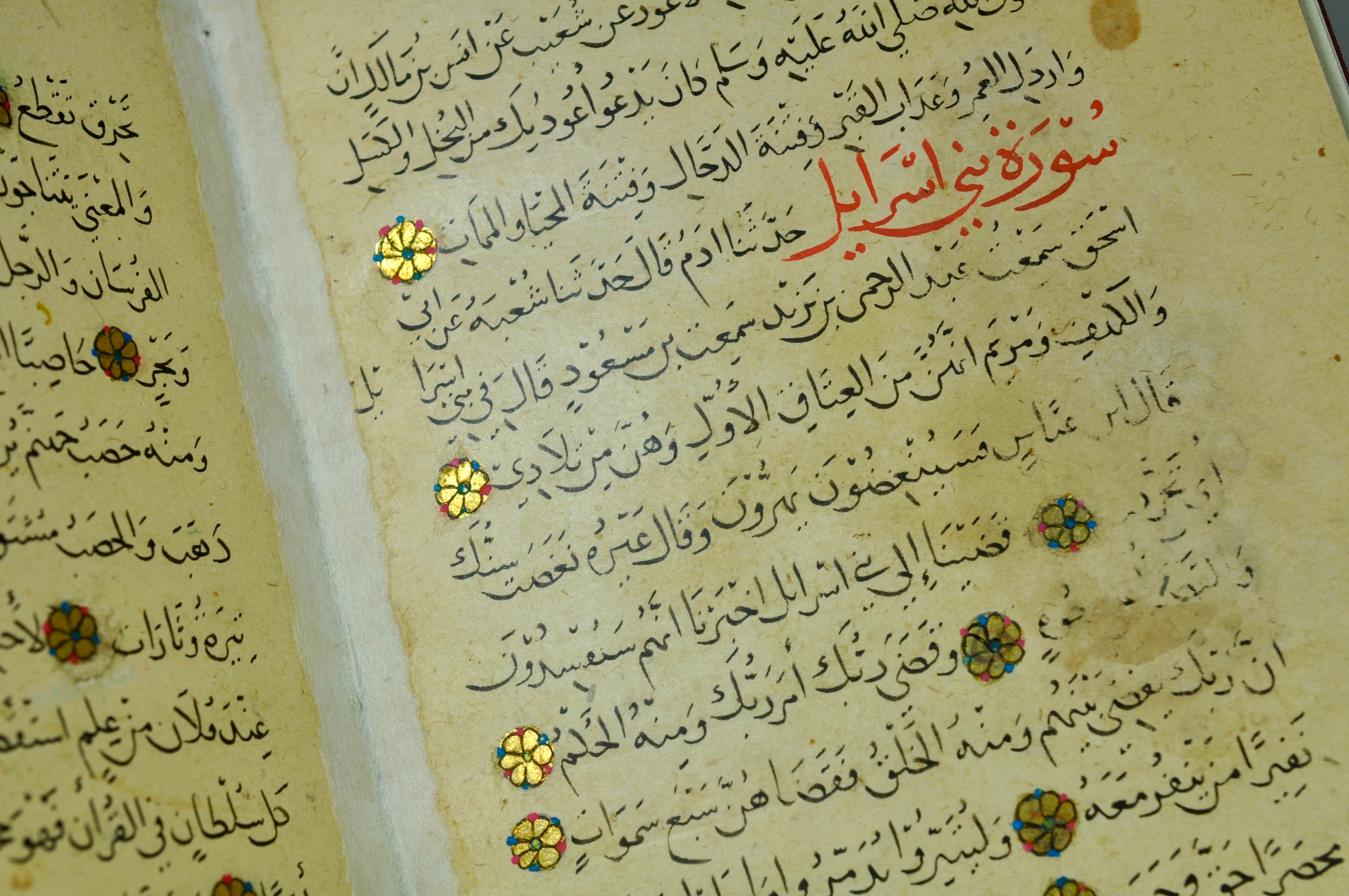
A manuscript copy of Sahih al-Bukhari, Mamluk era, 13th century, Egypt. Adilnor Collection, Sweden.

Criticism of ḥadīth (Note: The plural form of hadith in arabic is aḥādīth, أحاديث, ʼaḥādīth but hadith will be used for both singular and plural in this article.) or hadith criticism is the critique of ḥadīth—the genre of canonized Islamic literature made up of attributed reports of the words, actions, and the silent approval of the Islamic prophet Muhammad. (Note: Islamic scholar Patricia Crone writes "Nowadays, hadith almost always means hadith from Mohammed himself", but traditionally hadith meant "short reports (sometimes just a line or two) recording what an early figure, such as a companion of the prophet or Mohammed himself, said or did on a particular occasion, prefixed by a chain of transmitters.")

In mainstream Islam, the Sunnah (the teachings and practices of Muhammad) is regarded as an authoritative source of guidance, and many detailed rulings of Sharia (Islamic law) are derived from Hadith literature in addition to the Quran. However, Quranists reject the authority of the hadiths, viewing them as un-Quranic; they believe that obedience to Muhammad means obedience to the Quran; some further claim that most hadiths are fabrications (pseudepigrapha) created in the 8th and 9th century AD, and which are falsely attributed to Muhammad. Historically, some sects of the Kharijites also rejected the hadiths, while Mu'tazilites rejected the hadiths as the basis for Islamic law, while at the same time accepting the Sunnah and Ijma.

Criticism of ḥadīth has taken several forms. The classical Islamic science of ḥadīth studies was developed to weed out fraudulent accounts and establish a "core" of authentic (i.e., "sound" or ṣaḥīḥ) ḥadīth compiled in classical ḥadīth collections. But some Muslim thinkers and schools of Islam contend that these efforts did not go far enough. Among their complaints is that there was a suspiciously large growth in the number of ḥadīth with each early generation; (Note: According to Ibn Rawandi, "the danger inherent in this criticism is that it leads Muslims who accept it to the fatally dangerous conclusion that the body of Hadith is not the sayings of the Prophet and therefore does not carry his authority: [quoting Hossein Nasr] 'In this way one of the foundations of divine law and a vital source of guidance for the spiritual life is destroyed. It is as if the whole foundation were pulled from underneath the structure of Islam'".) that large numbers of ḥadīth contradicted each other; and that the genre's status as a primary source of Islamic law has motivated the creation of fraudulent ḥadīth.

These critics range from those who accept the techniques of ḥadīth studies but believe a more "rigorous application" is needed (Salafi Jamal al-Din al-Qasimi) in preparation for updating and re-establishing Sharia law; to those who believe it is important to follow the Sunnah but that the only handful of ḥadīth (mutawātir ḥadīth) are of sufficiently reliable basis to accept (19th-century modernist Sayyid Ahmad Khan); to "deniers of hadith" or "Hadith rejectors" who believe that the ḥadīth are not part of the Sunnah and that what Muslims are required to obey is contained entirely in the Quran (20th-century Quranist Aslam Jairajpuri). The term "Hadithist" is a term of reference or depiction, used by Hadith-rejecting Muslims to describe those who adhere to the Hadith.

== Emergence of hadith ==
=== Background ===
The earliest schools and scholars of Islamic law—starting around a century and a half after the death of Muhammad—did not all agree on the importance of Prophetic sunnah and its basis, being hadith ultimately attributed to Muhammad. Opinion ranged from prophetic hadith being one source of law among others (such as caliphal tradition or reports going back to Muhammad's followers), as was held by the ahl al-raʿy to outright rejection of hadith on the basis of their potentially tenuous historicity, as was held by the ahl al-kalām (referred to by some as "speculative theologians").

=== Al-Shafi'i and the canonization of hadith ===
A sizable shift in practice in favor of the tradition of prophetic hadith and its basis for Islamic law (fiqh) came with al-Shāfiʿī (767–820 CE), founder of the Shafi'i school of law. According to this school of thought, prophetic hadith override all other hadith. It is unlikely that consensus yet existed for this view at this time as Shafi'i would come to spend great effort on establishing and promulgating his views over other ones. For those who criticized the reliability of hadith on the basis of their long phase of oral transmission, al-Shafi'i responded by arguing that God's wish for people to follow Muhammad's example would result in God ensuring the preservation of the tradition. Sunnah became a source of divine revelation (wahy) and the basis of classical Islamic law (Sharia), especially in consideration of the brevity dedicated to the subject of law in the Quran (which, for example, does not comment in detail on ritual like Ghusl or Wudu, or salat, the correct forms of salutations, and the importance of benevolence to slaves.) Al Shafi'is advocacy played a decisive role in elevating the status of hadith although some skepticism along that of earlier lines would continue.

=== Hadith sciences ===
Once (authentic) hadith had attained their elevated status among the group inspired by al-Shafi'i who sought to establish Islamic practice on the basis of the Sunnah (Muhammad's deeds and sayings), the focus shifted amongst advocates of this group (who were called the ahl al-sunnah, or the "People of the Sunnah") to delineating between reliable or "sound" (ṣaḥīḥ) with unreliable hadith. The field that arose to meet this need came to be known as the hadith sciences (ʻilm al-ḥadīth), and this practice had entered into a mature stage by the 3rd century of Islam. (Note: The last compiler of the six Sunni Kutub al-Sittah to die, al-Nasa'i, passed on in 303 AH, 915 CE; some of the classical the Shia The Four Books were compiled later; Al-Shafiʿi had died in the middle of the second century) The hadith sciences helped undergird the triumph of Al-Shafi'is prioritization of prophetic hadith which became the primary sources of Islamic law and also became "ideological" tools in political/theological conflicts.

A challenge the hadith sciences had to confront was the massive scale of hadith forgery, (Note: According to Ibn Rawandi, "the danger inherent in this criticism is that it leads Muslims who accept it to the fatally dangerous conclusion that the body of Hadith is not the sayings of the Prophet and therefore does not carry his authority: [quoting Hossein Nasr] 'In this way one of the foundations of divine law and a vital source of guidance for the spiritual life is destroyed. It is as if the whole foundation were pulled from underneath the structure of Islam'".) with Muhammad al-Bukhari claiming that only ~7,400 narrations of 600,000 he investigated met his criteria for inclusion. Even among those 7,400, a large fraction were variants of the same report, but with a different chain of transmitters (isnad). (Note: (Experts, in general, have estimated the number of full-isnad narration at 7,397; eliminating those hadith with the same or only slightly different content, but with different chains of narrators, reduces the number to approximately 2,602.)) The criteria for establishing the authenticity (sihha) of hadith came down to corroboration of the same report but from different transmitters, assessing the reliability and character of the transmitters listed in the chain (although Muhammad's companions, the sahaba, were excluded from this as their association with Muhammad immediately guaranteed their character and competence), and the lack of gaps in the chain. By implication, defects in hadith might assumed to be associated with the lack of character (ʿadāla) or competence (ḍābiṯ) of its transmitters. It was also thought that such faulty transmitters could be identified and that the isnad was a direct reflection of the history of transmission of a tradition. Evaluation rarely looked at the content (matn) of a narration as opposed to its isnad. (Note: although examining the content of the hadith (matn) was "not entirely unknown".) Ultimately, evaluations of hadith remained haphazard between authors until the practice of the hadith sciences was standardized by Ibn al-Salah in the 13th century. It is through the lenses of this framework, supplemented by some additional work from Al-Dhahabi in the 14th century and Ibn Hajar al-Asqalani in the 15th century, that Muslim scholars since understood the discipline.

The first collections to be accepted as authoritative among Sunnis by the tenth century CE were the Sahihayn, referring to Sahih al-Bukhari and Sahih Muslim. Even as the set of canonical texts grew, the Sahihayn remained the core of the canon, with Sahih al-Bukhari typically being viewed as the most pre-eminent of the two. The tenth century CE also saw the inclusion of another two collections to form a Four-Book canon, including the Sunan Abi Dawud and Sunan al-Nasa'i. This grew into a Five-Book canon in the twelfth century, when Sunan al-Tirmidhi was added. In the same century, the modern Six-Book canon, known as the Kutub al-Sittah, emerged. Depending on the list, the sixth canonical book was the Sunan ibn Majah, the Sunan of Al-Daraqutni, or the Muwatta of Malik ibn Anas.

== History of Muslim criticism ==
Historically, some sects of the Kharijites rejected the Hadith. There were some who opposed even the writing down of the Hadith itself for fear that it would compete, or even replace the Qur'an. Mu'tazilites also rejected the hadiths as the basis for Islamic law, while at the same time accepting the Sunnah and ijma. Under the Abbasid caliph Al-Ma'mun (r. 813-833), the adherents of Kalam were favoured and the supporters of Hadith were treated harshly. Al-Ma'mun was inclined towards rational inquiry in religious matters, supported the proponents of Kalam and persecuted the adherents of Hadith. His two immediate successors, Al-Mu'tasim (r. 833-842) and Al-Wathiq (r. 842-847), followed his policies. Unlike his three predecessors, Al-Mutawakkil (r. 847-861) was not inclined to rational inquiry in religious matters, and strove to bolster the Hadith as a necessary source of the Sunnah.

Similarly, critics of collection and/or use of hadith in Islam can be found in the early era when the classical consensus of al-Shafiʿi was being developed and established (particularly by the ahl-i-kalam and Muʿtazilites) and many centuries later in the modern era when Islamic reformists (such as the ahl-i-Quran and thinkers such as Syed Ahmed Khan, Muhammad Iqbal) sought to revitalize Islam.

Although scholars and critics of the Hadith such as Aslam Jairajpuri and Ghulam Ahmed Perwez) have "never attracted a large following", they and others who propose limitations on usage of ḥadīth literature outside of the mainstream include both early Muslims (Al-Nawawi, Wāṣil b. ʿAṭāʾ, Ibrahim an-Nazzam) and later reformers (Syed Ahmed Khan, Muhammad Iqbal). Both modernist Muslims and Quranists believe that the problems in the Islamic world come partly from the traditional elements of the hadith and seek to reject those teachings.

=== Medieval criticism ===
==== Sunnis ====
Whether al-Bukhari and other traditional hadith scholars were successful in narrowing down hadith to its authentic "core" is disputed among Sunni Muslim scholars, especially prior to the early modern era. Al-Nawawi wrote that "a number of scholars discovered many hadiths" in the two most authentic hadith collections known as the Sahihayn—Sahih al-Bukhari and Sahih Muslim—"which do not fulfill the conditions of verification assumed" by the collectors of those works. Al-Ghazali addresses questions from an unnamed "questioner" about a number of problems the questioner sees in several hadith, such as "Satan runs in the blood vessels of one of you"; "satans nourish themselves from manure and bones"; and "Paradise is as wide as heaven and earth", yet it must be "contained somewhere within the bounds of those two?"

In the fifteenth century, when Ibn Hajar al-Asqalani encountered the hadith

- When `God created Adam, and he was sixty arms tall,' and that, after Adam fell, 'mankind has continued to shrink since that time.'

he noted that the ancient inhabitants of houses carved out of cliffs he had seen must have been about the same size humans of his day, simply "admitted frankly that 'to this day, I have not found how to resolve this problem'", without doubting the hadith's authenticity. However, with the rise of natural sciences and technology of the West, some Muslims came to a different conclusion. Critics also complained of hadith that sound less like what a prophet would say than someone in the post-Shafiʿi era justifying fabricating hadith. Such as

- '[Sayings attributed to me] which agree with the Koran, go back to me, whether I actually said them or not', and
- 'Whatever good sayings there are, I said them.'

Joseph Schacht argues that the very large number of contradictory hadith are very likely the result of hadith fabricated "polemically with a view to rebutting a contrary doctrine or practice" supported by another hadith.

While criticism of the authenticity of any hadith in the Sahihayn ceased during the early modern era, it has been revived again by the Salafi movement, a prominent example of this being Al-Albani.

==== Kalam theologians ====
According to scholar Daniel W. Brown, the questioning of the authenticity, scholarship and importance of Hadith goes back to the second century of Islam when al-Shafiʿi was establishing the final authority of a hadith of Muhammad in Islamic law. An opposing group, known as Ahl al-Kalam (or the Kalam theologians), were "highly critical of both the traditionists' method and the results of their work", doubting "the reliability of the transmission" of the hadith, including the traditionists' evaluation of the "qualities of the transmitters" of hadith they considered "purely arbitrary", and thought the collections of hadiths to be "filled with contradictory, blasphemous, and absurd traditions."

They did not doubt that Muslims ought to follow the example of the prophet, but maintained his "true legacy" was found "first and foremost in following the Quran"—an "explanation of all things" (Quran 16:89)—which hadith "should never be allowed to rule on". If a question was "not referred to in the Qur'an", Ahl al-Kalam "tended" to regard it as "having been left deliberately unregulated by God." They contended that obedience to the Prophet was contained in obeying only the Qur'an that God has sent down to him, and that when the Qur'an mentioned "the Book" together with "Wisdom" (4:113, 2:231, 33:34), "Wisdom" was not another word for hadith, but for "the specific rulings of the Book".

==== Mutazilites ====
Later, a similar group, the Mu'tazilites (which flourished in Basra and Baghdad in the 8th–10th centuries CE), also viewed the transmission of the Prophetic sunnah as not sufficiently reliable. The Hadith, according to them, was mere guesswork and conjecture, while the Quran was complete and perfect, and did not require the Hadith or any other book to supplement or complement it." Mutazilites believed that hadith were susceptible to ideological manipulation, that scrutiny of authenticity should be extended to the matn (content) of the hadith and not just the isnad, and that only mutawatir hadith should be accepted (i.e. hadith so widely transmitted that it was thought they could not be invented). In later periods, it was still accepted (such as with Al-Nawawi in the thirteenth century CE) that ahad hadith (those with a single chain of transmitters) only yield theoretical probability of historicity and not certainty. However scholars like Ibn al-Salah (d. 1245 CE), al-Ansari (d. 1707 CE), and Ibn 'Abd al-Shakur (d. 1810 CE) found "no more than eight or nine" hadiths that fell into the mutawatir category. Wāṣil b. ʿAṭāʾ (700–748 CE) defined a mutawatir hadith as one passed on by four independent transmitters, inspired by the juridical notion of the necessary number of witnesses needed as proof that an event took place (and to the exclusion that they all collaborated on a lie). Abū l-Hudhayl al-ʿAllāf (d. 227/841) suggested that twenty transmitters were needed with at least one being a believer. Some of the strongest skepticism was expressed by Ibrahim an-Nazzam (c. 775 – c. 845), for whom even mutawātir reports were insufficient for yielding knowledge. According to his analysis, the matn (content) of such hadith in some cases involved contradiction; they were the product of faulty human memory and bias. Relatedly, he did not believe that consensus among scholars yielded knowledge either.

=== Modern criticism ===
Since the 19th century Islamic scholar Syed Ahmed Khan, three important subjects concerning Islamic discourse on hadith included the character and competence of the Companions of the Prophet, scrutiny over the means of the preservation and transmission of hadith, and discourse on how efficacious sinad criticism itself was in parsing between genuine and unreliable traditions. Many conservative revivalists and liberal modernists of 20th century believed that a recourse to the Quran should be made in evaluating the Sunnah, contrary to Al-Shafiʽi and classical hadith criticism.

==== Revivalists ====
Revivalists (like Shah Waliullah Dehlawi, Shibli Nomani, Rashid Rida, (Note: Rashid Riba has been called both a "conservative revivalist" and a "rationalist reformer") Salafi Jamal al-Din al-Qasimi, Abul A'la Maududi, and Mohammed al-Ghazali), however, believed in the classical principles of hadith and Shariah law and held highly negative views about those who express skepticism towards classical hadith collections. Nevertheless, some also believed in the re-examination of those classical collections and enhancing emphasis on the content (matn) of hadith during evaluation.

Later in the 20th century, Salafist revivalists Shibli Nomani, Rashid Rida, Abul A'la Maududi, and Mohammed al-Ghazali also sought "to restore Islam to ascendency" (not just in India) and in particular to restore Sharia to the law of the lands of Islam it had been before being replaced by "secular, Western inspired law codes" of colonialism and modernity. At the same time they agreed that restoring relevant Sharia required "some reformulation" of the law, which would require a return to sources, which required agreement on how the sources were to be "interpreted and understand" and reassessment of hadith.

Shibli Nomani (1857–1914) argued that the traditional science of Hadith had errored by ignoring legal scholarship when its work "required the participation of legal scholars" (fuqaha). Instead had been dominated by Hadith collectors (muhaddith).

Applying legal scholarship involved examining hadith content (matn) for its spirit and relevance "within the context of the Sharia as a whole" according to the method of scholars of Islamic law (fuqaha) and weeding out corrupted hadith inconsistent with "reason, with human nature, and with historical conditions". (Rather than hadith collectors being the scholars of hadith science, they more resembled "laborers" who provided the raw materials to the "engineers" of hadith—namely the scholars of Islamic law.) Abul A'la Maududi (1903–1979), the leading South Asian revivalist of the 20th century, also argued matn was neglected and resulting in Hadith collectors accepting "traditions that ring false" and rejecting "traditions that ring true".

Maududi also raised the question of the reliability of companions of the prophet as transmitters of hadith, saying "even the noble companions were overcome by human weaknesses, one attacking another", and cited disputes among the companions:

Ibn Umar called Abu Hurayra a liar; Aisha criticized Anas for transmitting traditions although he was only a child during the life of the Prophet, and Hasan b. Ali called both Ibn Umar and Ibn al-Zubayr liars. (Note: Quote is from Daniel Brown. All of the examples come from Ibn ʿAbd al-Barr, Jamiʿ)

(Maududi's criticism clashed with the doctrine of classical hadith criticism that the collective moral character (ʿadāla) of the first generation of Muslims was above reproach, and though Maududi strongly opposed modernists who thought hadith should be used sparingly or not at all in Islamic law, he nonetheless came under attack from traditional Islamic scholars (ulama) for his views).

==== Quranism ====
Another development was the view that the Quran (and sometimes mutawatir traditions) should be used to re-evaluate the Sunnah, as among Mohammed al-Ghazali (1917–1996). While Shafīʿī and classical scholarship held that the "Sunnah rules on the Quran", al-Ghazali (and Shibli, Rashid Rida, Maududi) believed that the Quran must be "the supreme arbiter of the authenticity" of hadith. Rida "argued that all traditions at variance with the Quran should be discarded, irrespective of their chain of transmission". Examples of conflicts between the two sources were

- whether consumption of beef was haram, (The Quran gave permission to eat it, but muhaddith Muhammad Nasiruddin al-Albani declared it forbidden citing a hadith.)
- Whether the murder of a non-Muslim should be punished just as the murder of a Muslim was—with qiṣāṣ, or retribution. (When a non-Muslim engineer was attacked and killed in Saudi Arabia, a religious judge—qadi—ruled that qiṣāṣ could not be applied to his murderer, citing a hadith stating la yuqtalu muslimun fi kafirin. According to Muhammad al-Ghazali, this violated a Quranic principle of human dignity, though others do not find it in disagreement with the Quran.)

==== Modernists ====
Later, in nineteenth century British Raj, Islamic modernists like Syed Ahmed Khan sought to deal with Western colonial influence and the decline of Muslim powers through greater understanding of science and application of reason. They often favored reinterpretation of some doctrines, including sharia law in favor of modern norms like equal rights, peaceful coexistence, and freedom of thought.

Ahmed Khan "questioned the historicity and authenticity of many, if not most, traditions, much as the noted scholars Ignaz Goldziher and Joseph Schacht would later do." He blamed corruption of hadith on transmission according to bi'l-ma'na (sense of the story rather than verbatim) in particular, and "came to believe" only mutawatir hadith as "a reliable basis for belief independent of the Quran". Ahmed Khan was one of the pioneers of "the argument that the traditional hadith scientists (muḥaddithūn) neglected criticism of the matn (hadith content)—emersed in the difficulties of "examining the trustworthiness" of the narrators of the hadith, "they never got around" to the task of examining the hadith content.

One of the most influential modernist critiques comes from Mahmoud Abu Rayya, who argued that the basis of Islam rests on the Quran, reason, and mutawatir (as opposed to merely sahih) hadith. Other reports might find fault due to their emphasis on conveying the sense of the story as opposed to its exact meaning. Likewise, others insisted that the Quran could be used to overrule hadith that are at variance with it, including Sayyid Ahmad Khan, Rashid Rida, and a number of Egyptian intellectuas.

Recent political reforms in Saudi Arabia under King Salman bin Abdulaziz Al Saud also reflect trends towards the belief that hadith can be redundant and that religious law can more closely emphasize the Quran.

== Hadith limitations ==
=== Arguments for unreliable hadith ===
==== Internal contradictions ====
Some examples of hadith members of the Muʿtazila found fault with include:

- "Whoever has a mustard seed's weight of pride (arrogance) in his heart, shall not be admitted into Paradise. And whoever has a mustard seed's weight of faith in his heart, shall not be admitted into the Fire." (Note: found in Jami` at-Tirmidhi and other collections.)
- There is none among the bondsmen who affirmed his faith in La illaha ill-Allah there is no God but Allah) and died in this state and did not enter Paradise ... even though he committed adultery and theft.

In combination, the two hadith suggest God considers adultery and theft less serious than a grain of pride.

==== Contradiction with science ====
In the 19th and 20th century, controversy grew in Islamic sources over the interpretation of hadith (sometimes called mushkil al-ḥadīth) that came into conflict with the growing body of scientific knowledge, leading some, like Ahmud Abu Rayya, to question the corpus. For example, one hadith in Sahih al-Bukhari describes the course of the sun involving a phase where it prostrates towards God after setting, which was difficult to reconcile with the finding that the sun was always visible from some part of the earth and that the phenomena of rising and setting is relative to one's position on the earth. Other examples include descriptions of the activity of the devil in relation to Islamic ritual.

Among the scholars who believe that even sahih hadith suffer from corruption or who proposed limitations on usage of hadith include early Muslims Al-Nazzam (775–845 CE), Ibn Sa'd (784–845 CE), Al-Nawawi (1233–1277 CE), Ibn Hajar (1372–1449 CE), later reformers Syed Ahmed Khan (1817–1898 CE), Muhammad Iqbal (1877–1938 CE); and scholars from the West such as Ignác Goldziher, Joseph Schacht, and G.H.A. Juynboll, (and in the present day Israr Ahmed Khan).

==== Influence of other religions ====
In hadith studies, narratives assumed to be of foreign import are known as Israʼiliyyat. Although the designation indicates such stories develop from Jewish/Israelite sources, they may derive from other religions such as Christianity or Zoroastrianism. Some pre-modern scholars enthusiastically used them in exegisis while others condemned their use. In modern times they have been criticized as unIslamic.

Mahmud Abu Rayya (d. 1970), a friend and fellow disciple of Rashid Rida, argued in a 1958 book entitled "Lights on Muhammad's Sunna" (Adwa' 'al al-sunna al-muhammadiyya) that "many supposedly authentic Hadiths were actually Jewish lore that had been attributed to Muhammad".

The earliest Western scholar to note a relation between the hadith and Jewish influences was the French Orientalist Barthélemy d'Herbelot (d. 1695), who "claimed that most of the six books" (i.e. the "Kutub al-Sittah", the six collections of Sunni sahih/sound hadith) "and many parts of the hadith literature were appropriated from the Talmud" (the Talmud being recorded in Jerusalem at least a century before the birth of Muhammad—between the 2nd and 5th centuries CE—and later in what is now Iraq). Later many others orientalists, like Aloys Sprenger (d. 1893), Ignaz Goldziher (d. 1921), etc. continued criticism in that direction.

A more elaborated study was "Al‐Bukhārī and the Aggadah" by W.R. Taylor. Taylor compared some hadiths from Sahih al-Bukhari with "haggadic texts from the Talmud and Midrash", and concluded that the "hadiths were appropriated from the Talmud and Midrash". Taylor argued that large amounts of Jewish "oral information, narrations, stories, and folkloric information" found its way into "Islamic literature in general, and hadith literature in particular, during the transcription of the Talmud and Mishnah and after the formation of hadiths via the Jews living in the Arabian Peninsula, as well as the church fathers and Christian community." Other scholars find different religious influences for hadith: Franz Buhl connects the hadith with a more Iranian/Zoroastrian background, David Samuel Margoliouth with Biblical apocrypha and Alfred Guillaume puts more stress on a generic Christian influence.

==== Other criticisms ====
Other criticisms of reliability of hadith have been made, including that unlike the Quran, hadith were transmitted according to their gist or apparent meaning as opposed to exact wording; that hadith were not put into writing until over a century after Muhammad's death leaving unknown the level of variation that occurred in this period; and the idea that while Islamic law (Shariah) must be based on the highest standards of confidence, the "authentic" hadith even when rated as hasan (good) and daif (weak) hadith do not reach the epistemological status of "certainty of knowledge" with the possible exception of mutawatir hadith (defined as "a large number of narrators whose agreement upon a lie is inconceivable"), although mutawatir hadith are extremely scarce. (Note: Syed Ahmed Khan believed there to be only five such hadith.)

=== Explanations for unreliable hadith ===
Flaws in traditional hadith science

For many critics, the contradictions of hadith with natural law and with other hadith demonstrated that the traditional scientists of hadith (muhaddithin) had failed to find all false hadith and there must be something wrong with their method. Explanations of why this was included the neglect of hadith content (matn) by muhaddithin in favor of the evaluation of chain/isnad of the hadith. But this did not mean critics accepted the traditional evaluation of hadith transmission with its supposed knowledge of the character and capacity of the reported narrators, that the scientists had focused on. How could the study of the character of transmitters (ʿilm al-rijāl) be an exact science when it was "difficult enough to judge the character of living people, let alone those long dead." Information on the narrators was scarce and often conflicting, hypocrites could be very clever, there was "no assurance that all the relevant information" had been gathered, and if hadith could be falsified, could not the historical reports about transmitters be as well?

And for that matter, if the content (matn) of a hadith could be forged, why could not the chain of transmitters—the isnad? This was an issue traditional scientists of hadith had "completely discounted" and was "perhaps the most serious challenge of all" to classical hadith criticism (according to Daniel Brown). How could a hadith be judged "reliable on the basis of its chain of transmission when we know that forgers commonly fabricated" these chains "in order to hide their forgery?" There was, after all, strong incentive "to attribute one's own information" to the most highly regarded authorities.

Motivations/explanations for corruption

According to Bernard Lewis, "in the early Islamic centuries there could be no better way of promoting a cause, an opinion, or a faction than to cite an appropriate action or utterance of the Prophet." This gave strong incentive to fabricate hadith.

According to Daniel W. Brown citing Syed Ahmed Khan and Shibli Nomani, the major causes of corruption of even the ṣaḥīḥ hadith of Bukhari and Muslim are:

1. political conflicts,
2. sectarian prejudice, and
3. the desire to translate the underlying meaning (bi'l-maʿnā), rather than the original words verbatim (bi'l-lafẓ).

==== Unreliable transmitters ====
The primary tool of orthodox ʻilm al-ḥadīth (Hadith studies) to verify the authenticity of hadith is the hadith's isnad (chain) of transmitters. But in the oldest collections of hadith (which have had less opportunity to be corrupted by faulty memory or manipulation) isnad are "rudimentary", while the isnads found in later "classical" collections of hadith are usually "perfect", suggesting the correlation between supposedly high quality isnads and authentic hadith is not good.

According to Muslim Islamic scholar Jonathan A.C. Brown, 20th century Egyptian scholar Mahmoud Abu Rayya noted the problem of transmission of hadith from allegedly reliable companions of the Prophet. One Abu Hurairah, joined the Muslim community only three years before the Prophet's death (i.e. when the community was becoming triumphant) yet was the "single most prolific" transmitter of hadiths from among the companions, passing on "thousands of hadiths he claimed" to have heard—far more traditions than companions who had been with Muhammad since the beginning. (Note: According to A. Kevin Reinhart, 5,374 hadith have been attributed to Abu Hurairah, though he spent only 2 years and 3 months in the company of the Prophet (according to Al-Bukhari's biography of Muhammad). Closer Companions are credited with far fewer hadith; Abu Bakr is credited with 142 hadith, Uthman ibn Affan with 146, Umar ibn Khattab with 537, and Ali ibn Abi Talib with no more than 586 hadith.) Abu Rayya and others think it highly unlikely Abu Hurairah could have heard the thousands of hadiths he claimed to transmitted, nor that he learned the details of ritual and law to avoid mangling the meanings of hadiths on these issues he reported. (Abu Hurayra was also known to be obsessed with isr'iliyyat, i.e. tales from Jewish lore about earlier prophets, see below).

According to some narrations, Caliph ʿUmar discouraged the systematic documentation of Prophetic sayings. However, he would also send letters documenting rulings provided by Muhammad. During the Umayyad dynasty, hadith forgeries that attacked their enemy Ali and supported dynasty founder Muʿāwiya were state sponsored. The succeeding dynasty—the ʿAbbāsids—circulated hadith predicting "the reign of each successive ruler". Even traditionists whose job it was to filter out false hadith, cirulated fabricated hadith for causes they thought worthy—one Nūḥ b. Maryam "passed on false traditions [hadith] in praise of the Quran".

=== Circumscribed application ===
Another argument is that those verses of the Quran enjoining Muslims to obey/imitate Muhammad are directed at the Muhammad's contemporaries and not later generations. A least one group of Muslims (the Quranist Ahle-Quran movement) argue that the verses were directed towards the particular circumstances of the companions of the Prophet, Muhammad's contemporaries, and not to generations thereafter. As circumstances change so must details of the law, while the basic unchangeable principles of Islam are found in the Quran. (In addition, while the Quran includes term sunnah several times, including in the phrase "sunnat Allah" (way of God), it never talks about "sunnat al-nabi" (way of the prophet)—the phrase customarily used by proponents of hadith—or "sunnah" in connection with Muhammad or other prophets.)

Later Quranists expanded on this. Early twentieth century scholar, Muhammad Tawfiq Sidqi (d. 1920) of Egypt argued that "even mutawatir connection" of a hadith was not enough to "prove that a practice is binding in every age and every place". Sidqi called the hadith-based sunnah of Muhammad "temporary and provisional law", and offered several reasons why the sunnah was "intended only for those who lived during the Prophet's era":

- that the sunnah "was not written" down for safe keeping "during the time of the Prophet";
- the companions of Muhammad "made no arrangement for the preservation of the Sunnah "whether in a book or in their memories";
- hadith were not transmitted from one generation to the next verbatim;
- the sunnah was "not committed to memory" like the Quran so that "differences developed among different transmitters";
- if the sunnah "had been meant for all people" this would not have happened and it "would have been carefully preserved and circulated as widely as possible";
- much of the sunnah obviously only applies to "Arabs of Muhammad's time and is based on local customs and circumstances".

== Alternative religious sources ==
Across Islamic history, both prior to the rise of the use of hadith with the school of al-Shafi'i and among later Muslims who criticized the use of canonical hadith as a basis for religious belief and practice, other or more limited traditional sources have been used to establish the basis for Islamic thinking.

=== Living practice ===
Malik ibn Anas, active in the second Islamic century, believed that the most reliable way to access the tradition and practice of Muhammad was to follow the living tradition as practiced in Medina, the city that dominated the locus of Muhammad's affairs in the last decade of his life. Today, some critics (Fazlur Rahman Malik, Javed Ahmad Ghamidi) have attempted to working around the problem of hadith authenticity by establishing "a basis for sunnah independent of hadith". Some of the most basic and important features of the sunnah—the five pillars of salat (ritual prayer) and zakat (alms), etc.—were known to Muslims from being passed down 'from the many to the many' (according to scholars of fiqh such as Al-Shafi'i) i.e. by Mutawatir practice bypassing books of hadith. (Muhammad Tawfiq Sidqi and Rashid Rida also strongly embraced the five pillars of salat, zakat, sawm, etc. while questing the importance of hadith.) Fazlur Rahman Malik argued sunnah should be "a general umbrella concept" but not one "filled with absolutely specific content" of hadith. Though hadith and isnad (chain of transmitters) had been tampered with and could not be held at the level of vertatim divine revelation, nonetheless they should not be discarded because they passed on the "spirit" of Prophet and should be given high regard as ijma (consensus or agreement of the Muslim scholars—which is another classical source of Islamic law).

=== Quran ===
Associated with the argument that verses of the Quran enjoining Muslims to obey and imitate Muhammad apply only to contemporaries of The Prophet, is the idea that for modern Muslims, not only is hadith unnecessary, so is (much) of its basis, the Sunnah. Obedience to the Prophet is contained in obeying the Qur'an, the book that God sent down to Muhammad; that the Quran was an explanation of everything (16:89). Quranists also appeal to Quranic self-descriptions of being detailed and/or fully explained (7:52 10:37 6:114), complete/perfect/fulfilled (6:115), a "detailed explanation of all things" (12:111) and as having not neglected anything (6:38). In this tradition, some, like Muhammad Tawfiq Sidqi have argued that any matter of necessity in religion would have been included into the Quran whose preservation is believed to be guaranteed." Some view the Quran as overruling hadith or any other content in disagreement with it.

=== Mutawatir hadith ===
Some believe that a small subset of hadith—known as mutawatir hadith—offer certainty in knowledge. Mutawātir involves something transmitted by "a large number of narrators whose agreement upon a lie is inconceivable. This condition must be met in the entire chain from the origin of the report to the very end." Among sources of mutawatir tradition including some elements of living tradition (like ṣalāt prayer and the ceremonies of hajj pilgrimage), the entire Quran, and a few hadith. However, mutawatir hadith are insufficient to substantiate the emergent tradition of Islamic jurisprudence. The vast majority of hadith were ahad—i.e. hadith without "textually identical channels of transmission which are sufficiently numerous as to preclude any possibility of collaboration on a forgery". The authenticity of these hadith "are known only with probability", not certainty. The exact number of muawatir hadith were disputed due to debates about how many transmitters would be needed to classify a hadith as mutawatir, with candidate proposals ranging all the way from 5 to 313.

== Academic hadith studies ==
=== Overview ===
The academic study of hadith begins with Ignác Goldziher (1850–1921) and Joseph Schacht (1902–1969). (Note: Earlier European scholars who expressed skepticism of the hadith system were Aloys Sprenger (1813-1893) and William Muir (1819-1905)) The general sentiment has been that hadith do not constitute a reliable corpus of sources that go back to the historical Muhammad. This includes the body of legal hadith, which was hard to trace back to a time before the end of the first century after the death of Muhammad.

Goldziher, Schacht and other Western scholars have criticised traditional hadith sciences as being almost entirely focused on scrutinizing the chain of transmittors (isnad) rather than the actual contents of the hadith (matn), and that scrutiny of isnad cannot determine the authenticity of a hadith. According to Wael B. Hallaq, as of 1999 scholarly attitude in the West towards the authenticity of hadith has taken three approaches:

since Schacht published his monumental work in 1950, scholarly discourse on this matter (i.e., the issue of authenticity) has proliferated. Three camps of scholars may be identified: one attempting to reconfirm his conclusions, and at times going beyond them; another endeavoring to refute them and a third seeking to create a middle, perhaps synthesized, position between the two. Among others, John Wansbrough, and Michael Cook belong to the first camp, while Nabia Abbott, F. Sezgin, M. Azami, Gregor Schoeler and Johann Fück belong to the second. Motzki, D. Santillana, G.H. Juynboll, Fazlur Rahman and James Robson take the middle position.

These figures believed that forgery began very early and such forged material went on to contaminate what would be collected into the authentic group of hadith, (Note: "In truth the Hadith must be regarded with marked scepticism, so far as it is used as a source for the life of Mohammed. The forgery or invention of traditions began very early. The Companions were not always too scrupulous to clothe their own opinions in the form of anecdotes ... These natural tendencies were magnified by the party spirit which early became rife in Islam. Each party counted among its adherents immediate followers of Mohammed. Each was anxious to justify itself by an appeal to his words and deeds. It is only the natural result that traditions with a notoriously party bias were circulated at an early day. A traditionist of the first rank admits that pious men were inclined to no sort of fraud so much as to the invention of traditions ... From our point of view, therefore, many traditions, even if well authenticated to external appearance, bear internal evidence of forgery.") with only a small number of hadith actually originated with Muhammad or his followers. (Note: "... European critics hold that only a very small part of the ḥadith can be regarded as an actual record of Islam during the time of Mohammed and his immediate followers. It is rather a succession of testimonies, often self contradictory, as to the aims, currents of thought, opinions, and decisions which came into existence during the first two centuries of the growth of Islam. In order to give them greater authority they are referred to the prophet and his companions. The study of the ḥadith is consequently of the greater importance because it discloses the successive stages and controlling ideas in the growth of the religious system of Islam.") In his Muslim Studies, Goldziher states: "it is not surprising that, among the hotly debated controversial issues of Islam, whether political or doctrinal, there is not one in which the champions of the various views are unable to cite a number of traditions, all equipped with imposing isnads". In general, historians have cast doubt on the historicity and reliability of hadith for several reasons, including that the hadith sciences:

1. Hadith sciences arose long after hadith and isnads had originated and become widespread
2. Often relied on vague or unspecified argumentation and criteria
3. Produced a highly contradictory collection of texts
4. Authenticated many hadith containing anachronism or manifestly false content
5. Involves circular reasoning
6. Often relied on intuition
7. Involved motivated reasoning that, in turn, produced "a consequent denial of, disregard for, or even obfuscation of inexpedient evidence".

=== Lateness of prophetic attribution ===
Also throwing doubt on the doctrine that common use of hadith of Muhammad goes back to the generations immediately following the death of the prophet is historian Robert G. Hoyland, who quotes acolytes of two of the earliest Islamic scholars:

- "I spent a year sitting with Abdullah ibn Umar (d.693, son of the second Caliph, who is said to be the second most prolific narrator of ahadith, with a total of 2,630 narrations) and I did not hear him transmit anything from the prophet";
- "I never heard Jabir ibn Zayd (d. ca. 720) say 'the prophet said ...' and yet the young men round here are saying it twenty times an hour".

Historian Robert G. Hoyland, states during Umayyad times only the central government was allowed to make laws, religious scholars began to challenge this by claiming they had been transmitted hadith by the Prophet. Al-Sha'bi, a narrator of hadith, when hearing of this, criticizes people who just go around narrating many prophetic hadiths without care by saying he never heard from Umar I's son 'Abdallah any hadith from the Prophet except just one. Hoyland vindicates Islamic sources as accurately representative of Islamic history. Gregor Schoeler writes:

"He [Hoyland] shows that they [non-Islamic sources] are hardly suitable to support an alternative account of early Islamic history; on the contrary, they frequently agree with Islamic sources and supplement them."

The creation of politically convenient hadith proliferated. Even in the present day, and in the buildup to the first Gulf War, a "tradition" was published in the Palestinian daily newspaper Al-Nahar on December 15, 1990, reading: "and described as `currently in wide circulation`", and it quotes the Prophet as predicting that "the Greeks and Franks will join with Egypt in the desert against a man named Sadim, and not one of them will return". (Note: David Cook notes the "tradition was" not the only one that appeared around the time of the Gulf War. He translates the story: "Believing tongues these days are passing around an unknown tradition, whether it proceeded from the great Messenger [Muhammad] or not. An examination of [whether] the source is trustworthy and the transmitters reliable has occurred, and until now a large number of religious authorities have refused to confirm or deny the reliability of this tradition, [that it] came from the Messenger [of God] Muhammad. The tradition says: 'The Messenger of God said: "The Banu al-Asfar [white people], the Byzantines and the Franks [Christian groups] will gather together in the wasteland with Egypt[ians] against a man whose name is Sadim [i.e., Saddam]-- none of them will return. They said: When, O Messenger of God? He said: Between the months of Jumada and Rajab [mid-November to mid- February], and you see an amazing thing come of it".' " The hadith is "unknown" and of course turned out to be very untrue, but uses terms "Byzantines" and "Frank" used in early Islam. The date given—December 15, 1990—was after the anti-Sadam Hussein "coalition" forces had mobilized but before the war had been fought.))

=== Isnads ===
Reza Aslan quotes Schacht's maxim: `the more perfect the isnad, the later the tradition`, which he (Aslan) calls "whimsical but accurate".

Isnads are thought to have entered usage three-quarters of a century after Muhammad's death, before which hadith were transmitted haphazardly and anonymously. Once they began to be used, the names of authorities, popular figures, and sometimes even fictitious figures would be supplied. Over time, isnads would be polished to meet stricter standards. Additional concerns are raised by the substantial percentages of hadith that traditional critics are reported to have dismissed and difficulties in parsing out historical hadith from the vast pool of ahistorical ones. This perspective casts doubt on traditional methods of hadith verification, given their presupposition that the isnad of a report offers a sufficiently accurate history of its transmission to be able to verify or nullify it and the prioritization of isnads over other criteria like the presence of anachronisms in a hadith which might have an isnad that passes traditional standards of verification.

=== Biographical evaluation ===
Another criticism of isnads was of the efficacy of the traditional Hadith studies field known as biographical evaluations (ʿilm al-rijāl)—evaluating the moral and mental capacity of transmitters/narrators. John Wansbrough argues that the isnads are should not be accepted, because of their "internal contradiction, anonymity, and arbitrary nature": specifically the lack of any information about many of the transmitters of the hadith other than found in these biographical evaluations, thus putting into question whether they are "pseudohistorical projections", i.e. names made up by later transmitters.

=== Isnad-cum-matn analysis ===
In the 1990s, hadith historians developed a method known as isnad-cum-matn analysis (ICMA) as an alternative approach compared with traditional hadith sciences towards identifying the origins and developmental stages of hadith traditions. ICMA seeks to date and trace the evolution of hadith by identifying how variation in the text or content (matn) of a hadith correlates with the variation in the listed chain of transmitters (isnād) across multiple versions of the same report.

== Traditionalist response ==
Against critics claims that oral transmission of hadith for generations allowed corruption to occur, conservatives argue that it is not oral transmission that is unreliable but written transmission. In fact oral transmission was "superior to isolated written documents" which had "little value" unless "attested by living witnesses". In contrast, the reliability of oral transmission was "assured by the remarkable memories of the Arabs".

Orthodox Muslims do not deny the existence of false hadith, but believe that through the work of hadith scholars, these false hadith have been largely eliminated. al-Shafi'i himself, the founder of the proposition that "sunna" should be made up exclusively of specific precedents set by Muhammad passed down as hadith, argued that "having commanded believers to obey the Prophet" (citing Quran 33: 21), "God must certainly have provided the means to do so." Hadith defenders suggest that they were evaluated for forgeries from the beginning, before the science of hadith was established. Defenders of hadith also claim that the number of false hadith is exaggerated, and that many hadith not in sahih collections are perfectly authentic. They also assert that the science of hadith reached such a level of perfection that "no further research is necessary or fruitful". Furthermore, they suggest that critics who cite hadith that criticize the use of hadith are "tacitly accepting its authority as a legitimate basis for argument" and so contradicting themselves.

Orthodox hadith scholars (like Wael Hallaq and Ibn al-Salah) disagree with the idea that the basis for practice and belief must be limited to mutawatir hadith, finding non-mutawatir hadith adequate. "According to the majority of the ulama of the four Sunni schools, acting upon ahad is obligatory even if ahad fails to engender positive knowledge. Thus, in practical legal matters, preferable zann [meaning, speculative] "is sufficient as a basis of obligation", according to Mohammad Hashim Kamal. (However, in "matters of belief", the bar is higher and ahad hadith are not sufficient.) Ibn al-Salah (d. 643/1245), "one of the most distinguished traditionists of the muta'akhkhirun", argues (according to Farooq), that because mutawatir type hadith is rare, "for much of Islamic praxis, certainty of knowledge is neither feasible nor required. Rather, probable or reasonable knowledge is adequate" for determining the gamut of Islamic practices.

Traditionalist approaches are viewed by supporters as more reliable than modern academic ones and those adhering to the former, such as Mustafa al-Siba'i and Muhammad Mustafa Al-A'zami, have produced works dedicated to demonstrating this. According to Jonathan Brown, more recent generations of modern hadith academics like Harald Motzki have taken a more positive view of the reliability of hadith compared to those from previous generations, like Ignaz Goldziher, Joseph Schacht, and G.H.A. Juynboll.
