= Ignác Goldziher =

Hungarian scholar of Islam (1850–1921)

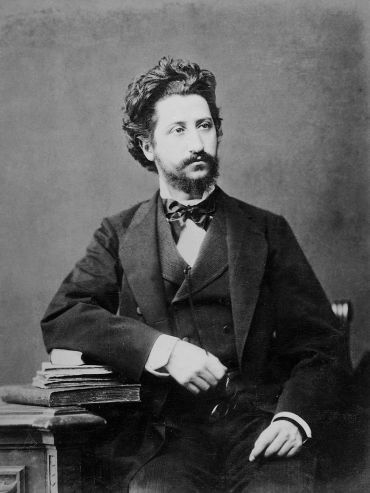
- Portrait
- Born: 22 June 1850; Székesfehérvár, Hungary
- Died: 13 November 1921 (aged 71); Budapest, Hungary
- Scientific career
- Fields: Islamic studies

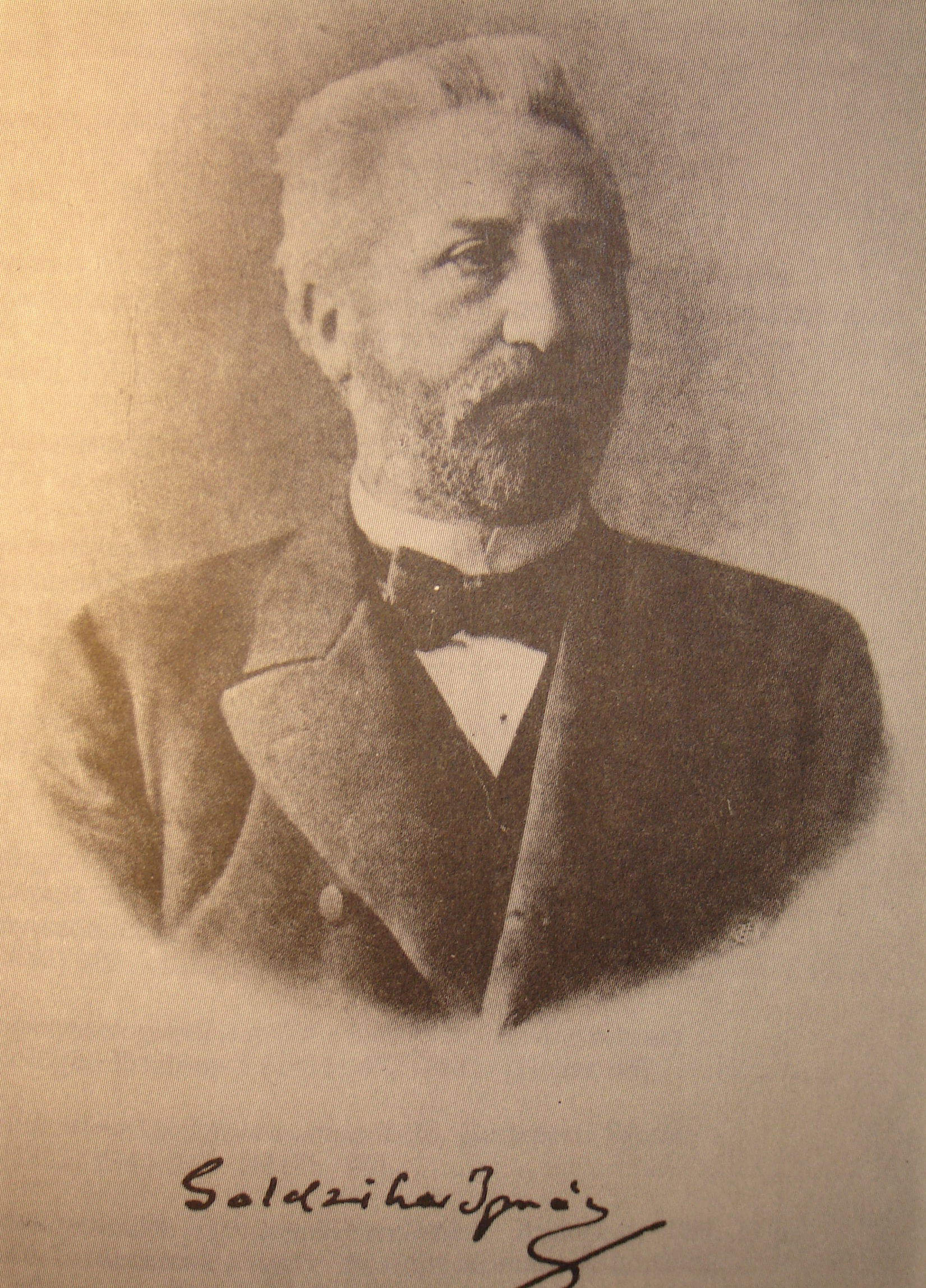
Goldziher image from a book

Ignác (Yitzhaq Yehuda) Goldziher (22 June 1850 – 13 November 1921), often credited as Ignaz Goldziher, was a Hungarian scholar of Islam. Alongside Joseph Schacht and G.H.A. Juynboll, he is considered one of the pioneers of modern academic hadith studies.

His most important work is the two-volume Muhammedanische Studien (Mohammedan Studies), especially its second volume, which addresses questions of the origins, evolution, and development of hadith.

== Biography ==
Letter (1888)

Born in Székesfehérvár of German Jewish heritage, he was educated at the universities of Budapest, Berlin, Leipzig and Leiden with the support of József Eötvös, Hungarian minister of culture. He became privatdozent at Budapest in 1872. In the next year, under the auspices of the Hungarian government, he began a journey through Syria, Palestine and Egypt, and took the opportunity of attending lectures of Muslim sheiks in the mosque of al-Azhar in Cairo. In 1888 he wrote his main studies of Islam which attributed several traditions of Muhammad to a later period. Goldziher was denied a teaching post at Budapest University until he was 44. He represented the Hungarian government and the Academy of Sciences at numerous international congresses. He received the large gold medal at the Stockholm Oriental Congress in 1889. He became a member of several Hungarian and other learned societies, and was appointed secretary of the Jewish community in Budapest. He was made Litt.D. of Cambridge (1904) and LL.D. of Aberdeen (1906). Goldziher died in Budapest.

== Religious views ==
Goldziher kept a personal record of his reflections, travel records and daily records. This journal was later published in his German mother tongue as Tagebuch. The following quotation from Goldziher's published journal provides insight into his feelings about Islam.

Ich lebte mich denn auch während dieser Wochen so sehr in den mohammedanischen Geist ein, dass ich zuletzt innerlich überzeugt wurde, ich sei selbst Mohammedaner und klug herausfand, dass dies die einzige Religion sei, welche selbst in ihrer doktrinär-offiziellen Gestaltung und Formulirung philosophische Köpfe befriedigen könne. Mein Ideal war es, das Judenthum zu ähnlicher rationeller Stufe zu erheben. Der Islam, so lehrte mich meine Erfahrung, sei die einzige Religion, in welcher Aberglaube und heidnische Rudimente nicht durch den Rationalismus, sondern durch die orthodoxe Lehre verpönt werden. (p. 59)

i.e., "In those weeks, I truly entered into the spirit of Islam to such an extent that ultimately I became inwardly convinced that I myself was a Muslim, and judiciously discovered that this was the only religion which, even in its doctrinal and official formulation, can satisfy philosophic minds. My ideal was to elevate Judaism to a similar rational level. Islam, as my experience taught me, is the only religion in which superstitious and heathen ingredients are not frowned upon by rationalism, but by orthodox doctrine."

Sander Gilman, in commenting on this passage, writes that, 'the Islam he discovered becomes the model for a new spirit of Judaism at the close of the nineteenth century.' In Cairo, Goldziher even prayed as a Muslim: "In the midst of the thousands of the pious, I rubbed my forehead against the floor of the mosque. Never in my life was I more devout, more truly devout, than on that exalted Friday."

Despite his admiration for Islam, Goldziher remained a devout Jew all his life. This bond to the Mosaic faith was unusual for a man seeking an academic career in Europe in the late 19th century. He turned down several academic appointments outside of Hungary and struggled to understand his faith while transcending conventional piety and patriotism. This fact is significant in understanding his work. He saw Islam through the eyes of someone who refused to assimilate into contemporary European culture. In fact, despite his fondness for Islam, he had little affection, if not outright scorn, for European Christianity.

=== Judaism and Zionism ===
Goldziher viewed Zionism as an ethno-nationalist sentiment and a distinctly separate ideology from the religion of Judaism or what makes one a Jew, writing:

Jewishness is a religious term and not an ethnographical one. As regards my nationality I am a Transdanubian, and by religion a Jew. When I headed for Hungary from Jerusalem I felt I was coming home. Man is the product of objective historical conditions. His character is determined by these conditions and not by the index of his skull.

== Islamic studies ==
In 1890, Ignaz Goldziher published his work Muhammedanische Studien, inaugurating what Fred Donner has called the "traditional-critical approach" to the studies of early Islam and Islamic texts. In this work, Goldziher became the first academic in the West to understand the corpus of hadith texts within the purview of the conflicting political, religious, and social interests that was faced by the Islamic community in the initial centuries of its existence. Goldziher argued, against prior views about the authenticity of the corpus, that these hadith were creations of later periods and that their origins often reflect the later types of interests by the community. The novelty of Goldziher's analysis, compared to earlier Muslim efforts that attempted to delineate between historical and ahistorical hadith, was that Goldziher's analysis were limited to hadith that had previously been considered authentic or historical in traditional Islamic narrative. Thus, Goldziher "inaugurated the critical study" of the hadith's authenticity and concluded that "the great majority of traditions from the Prophet are documents not of the time to which they claim to belong" but created "during the first centuries of Islam," i.e. were fraudulent. This included hadith "accepted even in the most rigorously critical Muslim collections", which meant that "the meticulous isnads which supported them were utterly fictitious" (R. Stephen Humphreys). Instead, Goldziher argued in his book Muslim Studies, hadith were the product of "debates and arguments within the emerging [Islamic] religion and society ... projected back into the time of the Prophet" and were a means of putting "support for one party or another ... into the mouth of the prophet" (in the words of G.R. Hawting). Tied to this, and Goldziher's observation of the massive scale on which hadith were forged, was his observation that each position in every political and doctrinal controversy could be paired with numerous supporting hadiths, each equipped with an isnad. Goldziher also observed replete anachronism in the hadith literature, including in:

reports supporting the legitimacy of dynasties; traditions addressing how believers should respond to ungodly rulers; hadith supporting particular positions in theological controversies; reports giving voice to local patriotism; reports praising the merits of particular localities, tribes or families; apocalyptic prophecies of conquests and rebellions; and hadith praising the descendants of ʿAlī or, conversely, seeking to limit Alid legitimacy.

As for isnads, Goldziher viewed them as a secondary attempt at justifying the traditions that particular actors cited during their controversies. The only relevant factor in evaluating the provenance and credibility of a hadith was its matn (content), and not its isnad.

He was a strong believer in the view that Islamic law owes its origins to Roman law but in the opinion of Patricia Crone his arguments here are "uncharacteristically weak".

== Influence and reception ==
=== Islamic studies ===
Goldziher's influence was a result of his careful investigation of pre-Islamic and Islamic law, tradition, religion and poetry, in connection with which he published a large number of treatises, review articles and essays contributed to the collections of the Hungarian Academy.

Goldziher's own analyses were limited to and sampled from legal and theological hadith, but his approach was extended into other categories of texts in the ensuing years, including Quran commentary, sirah literature, and more, especially by Henri Lammens and Leone Caetani in the immediate years following his major work. Another consequence of Goldziher's work has been to shift the conversation away from the study of the type of history that can be reconstructed from these types of sources, which Goldziher thought was very little, and into what they tell us about how Muhammad was represented in the second and third centuries of the Islamic era in literary sources.

Several scholars have challenged aspects of Goldziher’s conclusions, particularly his skepticism regarding the early written transmission of hadith. Among those advancing alternative models are Fuat Sezgin, Mustafa Aʿzami, Nabia Abbott, and Ibrahim Al-Sakran who argue for a more substantial role of written documentation in the formative period of hadith literature and supporting the use of the methods of the early Islamic scholars to parse out fabricated reports. However, according to Daniel W. Brown, this approach has not found much traction amongst other scholars, "Goldziher’s broad premise won the day: the vast bulk of the hadith literature will be of little help as a source for seventh‐century Arabia or the career of the Prophet, rather it will provide evidence about the beliefs of the Muslim community and the development of Islamic law and piety." Harald Motzki has also criticized Goldziher using source-critical methods, disputing the precision of his methods of dating hadith, arguing that his skepticism was excessive, and that more rigorous methods, such as isnad-cum-matn analysis, can date traditions earlier, to the late first or early second century after Muhammad. However, given these disagreements, Motzki's critique was "not to argue for the authenticity of hadith in the general sense".

Along with Joseph Schacht (1902–1969), who expanded on his work, Goldziher is thought to have authored one of the "two influential and founding works" of Islamic studies or "Orientalist" studies (Goldziher's being Muslim Studies) according to Mohammed Salem Al-Shehri.

=== Edward Said ===
Goldziher's works have taken on a renewed importance in recent times owing to Edward Said's book Orientalism. Said himself was to reprove his work's defect for failing to pay sufficient attention to scholars like Goldziher. Of five major German orientalists, he remarked that four of them, despite their profound erudition, were hostile to Islam. Goldziher's work was an exception in that he appreciated 'Islam's tolerance towards other religions', though this was undermined by his dislike of anthropomorphism in Mohammad's thought, and what Said calls 'Islam's too exterior theology and jurisprudence'.

== Works ==
- Ignác Goldziher, Abū Ḥātim Sahl ibn Muḥammad Sijistānī (1896). Kitāb al-muʻammirīn. Vol. 1-2 of Abhandlungen zur arabischen Philologie. Buchhandlung und Druckerei vormals E.J. Brill.
- Tagebuch, ed. Alexander Scheiber. Leiden: Brill, 1978. ISBN 90-04-05449-9
- Zur Literaturgeschichte der Shi'a (1874)
- Beiträge zur Geschichte der Sprachgelehrsamkeit bei den Arabern. Vienna, 1871–1873.
- Der Mythos bei den Hebräern und seine geschichtliche Entwickelung. Leipzig, 1876; or, "Mythology among the Hebrews," Eng. trans., R Martineau, London, 1877.
- Muhammedanische Studien. Halle, 1889–1890, 2 vols. ISBN 0-202-30778-6
  - English translation: Muslim Studies, 2 vols. Albany, 1977.
- Abhandlungen zur arabischen Philologie, 2 vols. Leiden, 1896–1899.
- Buch vom Wesen der Seele. Berlin 1907.
- Vorlesungen über den Islam. 1910; 2nd ed. revised by Franz Babinger, 1925.
  - English translation: Introduction to Islamic Theology and Law, trans. Andras and Ruth Hamori. Princeton University Press, 1981.
- A nyelvtudomány történetéröl az araboknál, 1878. (in Hungarian)
  - English translation: On the History of Grammar among the Arabs: An Essay in Literary History, Philadelphia, John Benjamins. 1994.

== See also ==
- Islamic scholars
- Isnad-cum-matn analysis
- Josef Horovitz
- Joseph Schacht
