= Ismail Adham =

Egyptian writer and literary critic (1911–1940)

Ismail Ahmed Adham
- إسماعيل بن أحمد بن إسماعيل بن إبراهيم بن أدهم
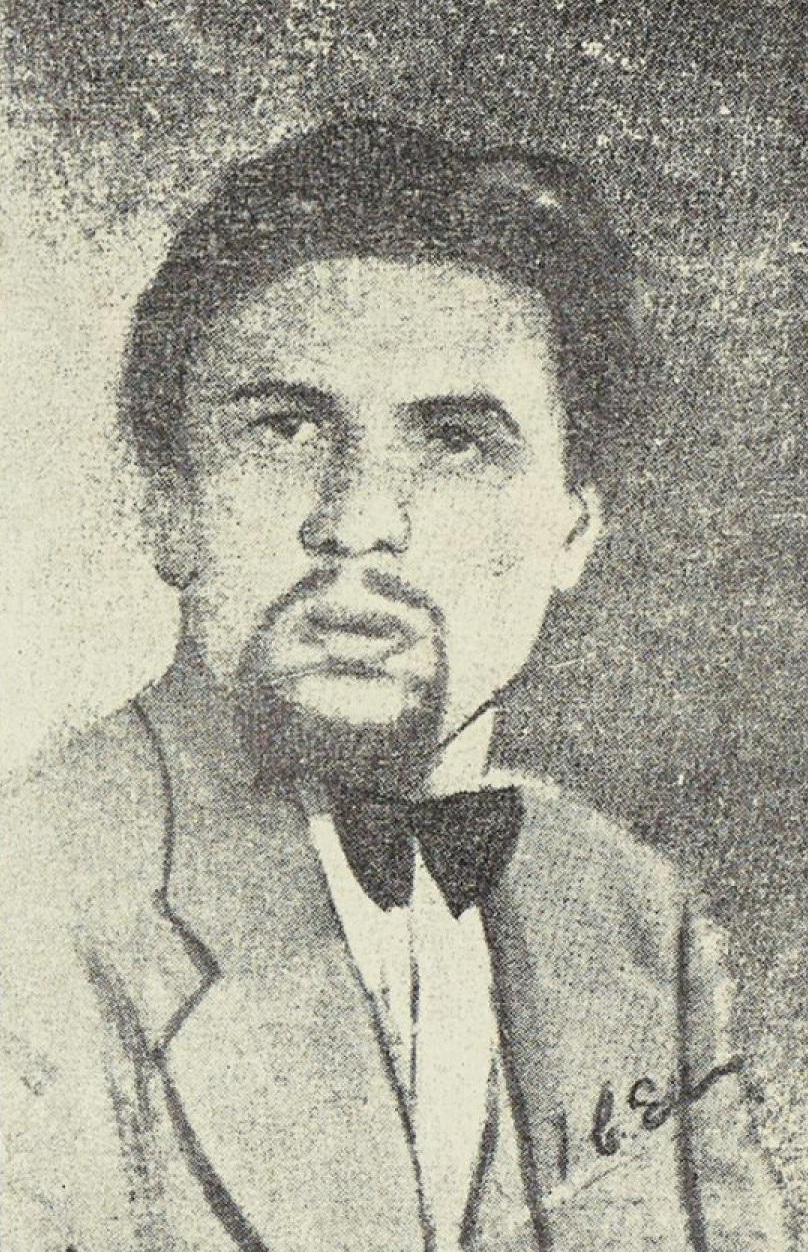
- Undated
- Born: Ismail bin Ahmed bin Ismail bin Ibrahim bin Adham; 17 February 1911; Alexandria, Egypt
- Died: 23 July 1940 (aged 29); The Mediterranean Sea, Alexandria, Egypt
- Citizenship: Egypt
- Occupation: Writer
- Writing career
- Notable works: Limāḏā ʾanā Mulḥid (Why Am I An Atheist?), Min masadir al-tarikh al-islami (From The Sources of Islamic History)

Ismail Ahmed Adham (Arabic: إسماعيل أحمد أدهم IPA: [esmæˈʕiːl ˈæħmæd ˈʔædhæm] Ismā'īl Aḥmed Adham; 17 February 1911 – 23 July 1940) better known as Ismail Adham was an Egyptian writer, and atheist. He is known primarily for his work (Why Am I An Atheist?), in which he declared his atheism in 1937.

== Life ==
He was born and educated in Alexandria, his father was a Turkish army officer Ahmed Adham, and his mother a German lady, he claimed to have obtained a Bachelor's degree in mathematics from Istanbul University, and to have received Ph.Ds doctorates in physics and philosophy from Moscow State University in 1931, and was appointed as a professor of physics for one year at Leningrad University. Then he went back to Turkey and was a teacher of mathematics or physics in Ankara, and returned to Egypt in 1935, he went to live on the small estate near Alexandria that his father had left him, furthermore he claimed that his mother was the daughter of J.H van't Hoff, a member of Prussian Academy of Sciences, and at one time professor at University of Berlin, it is unlikely that J.H van't Hoff was his grandfather, whom he mistook for a German, and claimed to have written books and articles in Russian, French, German, English, and Turkish.

== Career ==
=== Why Am I An Atheist? (1937) ===
In his article he declared himself an atheist for social, psychological, and scientific reasons, the last of which he set out to expound. There then follows a shallow, quasi-scientific exposé in which he argues that the world is subject to the all-embracing law of chance (qanun as-sudfa or at-tasaduf ash-shamil). That meant that the world could be compared with a printing-office with millions and millions of pieces of type. If one combines these pieces haphazardly for an infinite length of time, Adham argued, one can expect one day to see this article, or the Quran for that matter. Einstein, Adham said, found only one element in a book that remained unclear to him, and that element he called the intellect of the author. But, Adham concluded, in this Einstein overlooks the law of chance which, in the end, can be held responsible for the coming into existence of everything.

He declared in this booklet that he is happy and content with atheism, just as a believer in God feels happy and at peace.

After the publication of Limada ana mulhid (Why Am I An Atheist?), Adham became known as the "atheist who spoke his mind candidly", the book was criticized by Muslim writers and Azharites.

=== From The Sources of Islamic History (1936) ===
A book in which he disputed the authenticity and the historical reliability of hadith. He sent 100 free copies to the religious scholars at Al-Azhar. This enraged the Rector of Al-Azhar Muhammad Mustafa al-Maraghi, who complained to the Ministry of Interior, and within few days the book was banned.

He ended the book with two conclusions:

1. The Hadith originated later than the era of the Companions of the Prophet who knew Muhammad well.
2. The Hadith originated from the spirit of civilization brought to Islam by the new Muslims who wanted to know what Muhammad said and did.

He has been accused by some of plagiarism from the works of Orientalists Ignaz Goldziher and Leone Caetani.

== Views about him ==
Several historians and researchers, wrote about him, including Al-Zirakli in "Al-Alam", Al-Kayyali in “The Departed,” and Ahmed Al-Hawari in his collection of the aforementioned works. These short biographies were collected by the researcher Suleiman Al-Kharashi in his book “The Suicide of Ismail Adham,” with some references about Adham in newspapers and magazines, as well as responses and discussions, about his book (Why Am I An Atheist?).

In 1972, an article for Journal of arabic literature by G.H.A Juynboll said:

Adham never got any doctorate, never became a member of the Academy of Sciences, never published one book or article in either Russian, French or German, never wrote his two-volume work in Turkish, entitled Islam Tarihi, never made friends with the Russian Orientalist Barthold, who had already died in 1930, one year before Adham claims to have gone to Russia, and never met with favourable criticism from the Russian Orientalist Kazimirsky, because there was no such person.

It has been suggested that Adham may never have travelled beyond Egypt.

== Death ==
Adham apparently suffered from depression, and fueled his melancholy by reading Schopenhauer and Kierkegaard.

On the evening of July 23, 1940, the body of Ismail Adham was found floating on the waters of the Mediterranean coast, off Gleem Beach, In his coat, the police found a letter from him to the chief prosecutor informing him that he had committed suicide due to his asceticism in life and his hatred for it, and that he recommended that his body not be buried in a Muslim cemetery and requested that it be burned and his skull to be crushed.

=== Possible Suicide Motives ===
- It was well-known, some said, that he suffered from tuberculosis.
- Others have suggested the following he was soon to be evacuated from that part of Alexandria near the harbour where he lived, because of war danger.
- G.H.A Juynboll suggested that he committed suicide out of fear of being found out as an imposter, an idea that must have been a nightmare to him.

== Publications ==
Adham, Ismail Ahmed (1937). Why Am I An Atheist? (PDF).

Adham, Ismail Ahmed (1936). From The Sources of Islamic History (PDF).
