= Mahmud Abu Rayyah =

Egyptian writer and hadith critic (1889–1970)

- محمود أبو رية
- Born: 15 December 1889; Kafr al-Mandara, Dakahlia Governorate, Khedivate of Egypt
- Died: 11 December 1970 (Note: Most sources give 1970 as the year of death. One recent study gives 11 December 1971.); Giza, Egypt
- Education: Al-Azhar University
- Occupation: Writer
- Known for: Modernist criticism of hadith
- Notable work: Adwa' 'ala al-Sunna al-Muhammadiyya; Din Allah wahid Shaykh al-Mudira Abu Hurayra

Mahmud Abu Rayyah (Arabic: محمود أبو رية; 15 December 1889 – 11 December 1970) was an Egyptian writer and Islamic modernist known for his criticism of the hadith tradition in Sunni Islam. A discipline of the reformist Rashid Rida, Abu Rayyah argued that Islam should rest on the Qur'an, reason, and only the most widely transmitted reports of the Prophet's sayings. His principal work, Adwa' 'ala al-Sunna al-Muhammadiyya (transl. Lights on the Muhammadan Sunnah; 1958), was described by Jonathan A. C. Brown as the most controversial and trenchant modernist criticism of Sunni hadiths ever written.

Abu Rayyah's challenges to the reliability of the hadith narrated by Abu Hurayra and Ka'b al-Ahbar provoked significant controversy among Sunni scholars in 20th-century Egypt. Shi'i writers, by contrast, received his worth sympathetically. His views remain a subject of debate in hadith scholarship at present day.

Later in life, Abu Rayyah wrote Din Allah wahid (transl. God's Religion Is One), which argued for the essential unity of Judaism, Christianity, and Islam.

== Early life ==
Mahmud Abu Rayyah was born on 15 December 1889 in Kafr al-Mandara, a village in the Aja district of Dakahlia Governorate in the Nile Delta. He received both secular and religious schooling at the elementary and secondary levels. Thereafter, he enrolled at the al-Azhar University, where he completed a two-year course at Madrasat al-Da'wa wa-I-Irshad under the tutelage of Rashid Rida. He later worked at several foreign schools in Cairo. He spent most of his life in Mansoura before moving to Giza in 1957, where he remained until his death.

Abu Rayyah belonged to the reformist movement associated with Jamal al-Din al-Afghani and Muhammad Abduh. According to historians Ali Merad and Ronald Nettler, Abu Rayyah was a disciple of Abduh's student, Rashid Rida.

== Career ==
Abu Rayyah spent much of his career contributing to the Cairo literary magazine al-Risala, on hadith, Qur'an, and literature. His contributions included articles about Abu Bakr al-Siddiq (1943), the revelation of the Qur'an (1943), and a series entitled Fi al-Hadith al-Muhammadi (transl. On the Prophetic Hadith; 1951).

An early pronouncement of Abu Rayyah's ideas appeared in al-Risala in August 1945 in an article titled al-Hadith al-Muhammadi, which offered a summary of a forthcoming book Abu Rayyah was working on. The article drew a rebuttal in the same magazine from the Azhari scholar Muhammad Abu Shahba, who urged Abu Rayyah to reconsider his conclusions and rewrite the work. Abu Rayyah published a reply, describing his critic's article as one that "draws towards the truth and seeks it", but held the book back from publication for more than a decade.

Adwa' 'ala al-Sunna al-Muhammadiyya was eventually published in Cairo in 1958. Its chapter on Abu Hurayra was later developed into a separate book entitled Shaykh al-Mudira Abu Hurayra. The title of this work derives from an old nickname for Abu Hurayra, "the shaikh of the mudira", which alludes to a dish reportedly favoured at the table of Mu'awiya ibn Abi Sufyan; this culinary reference is well-documented in classical literature, such as al-Hamadani's Maqamat and the works of al-Zamakhshari. In Adwa' and the subsequent book, Abu Rayyah endorsed the verdict on Abu Hurayra reached by the Lebanese Shi'i scholar 'Abd al-Husayn Sharaf al-Din in his polemic, Abu Hurayra (1946).

Abu Rayyah also edited reformist texts. His 1966 edition of Muhammad Abduh's Risalat al-Tawhid restored a passage that Rashid Rida had removed from the text's second edition, published in 1908. That same year, Abu Rayyah edited the treatise of the fourteenth-century jurist Najm al-Din al-Tufi on giving precedence to the public interest (maslaha) over the text of revelation in social transactions.

Later in life, Abu Rayyah wrote Din Allah wahid 'ala alsinat jami' al-rusul (transl. God's Religion Is One on the Tongues of All the Messengers), which was first released in 1963, with an expanded second edition published in 1970. Religious authorities in Cairo protested the first edition, and it was nearly banned on completion of printing. Taha Hussein, who read the manuscript, wrote to Egypt's Minister of Culture, Mohamed Abdel Qader Hatim, that he had found nothing in it contrary to Islam. As a result, the minister authorized its publication. The book argued that the religion of God is one in essence across the messages of all the prophets, and that Jews and Christians, as People of the Book, should not be counted as unbelievers or polytheists. On the subject of Christians' and Jews' food, Abu Rayyah quoted Rida's Tafsir al-Manar.

== Views ==
Jonathan A. C. Brown identifies the modernist Salafi scholar, Rashid Rida, as Abu Rayyah's mentor. Abu Rayyah borrowed from Rida's works the hadiths he used to challenge the comprehensive scope of Islamic law, which he did more radically than Rida ever had. Rida had tried to limit the binding force of juristic opinion by reworking al-Shafi'is distinction between the "knowledge of the masses" and the "knowledge of the elect." Abu Rayyah instead held that hadiths not transmitted on a massive scale (i.e., mutawatir) and accepted by all Muslims were not part of the Sunnah at all. In his view, Islam should rest of the Qur'an, reason, and such mass-transmitted reports alone. The Prophet's normative precedent consisted only of the agreed-upon elements of Muslim practice—the practiced Sunnah (i.e., sunan 'amaliyya). Other hadiths lacking that level of transmission might be followed by individuals but could not serve as a basis for communal lawmaking (i.e., tashri' 'amm).

Abu Rayyah's most contentious claims concerned Abu Hurayra, the Companion credited with more hadith narrations than any other, conventionally numbered at 5,374. Abu Rayyah considered this volume implausible given that Abu Hurayra spent roughly three years—or, by some accounts, only a year and nine months—in the Prophet's company. He further asserted that the Companion's very name was a matter of unresolved disagreement, that he engaged in tadlis (i.e., obscuring one's true source in transmission), and that his conduct reflected an alignment with Umayyad interests under Mu'awiya.

Abu Rayyah's attack on the Isra'iliyyat (i.e., narratives of Jewish and biblical origin that entered Islamic literature) continued a theme developed by Rida. He set out his position as early as 1946, writing that this material had been meant to corrupt Islam from the outset. In this regard, he charged that Ka'b al-Ahbar, a Yemenite Jewish convert of the caliph Umar's era, had converted insincerely and had exploited Abu Hurayra's credulity in order to introduce Jewish lore into hadith; he extended similar criticism to Wahb ibn Munabbih and Abd Allah ibn Salam. Among the reports he singled out were traditions on the sun and moon being cast into hellfire, the celestial rooster, and the rivers of paradise, which he regarded as myths that exposed the religion to ridicule.

== Reception and legacy ==
Adwa' 'ala al-Sunna al-Muhammadiyya divided Egyptian opinion on its publication in 1958. Taha Hussein praised the Abu Rayyah's analyses, remarking that a contemplative reader would notice the years of reading in sources "that researchers can barely delve into". Traditional scholars responded with sustained refutations. Mustafa al-Siba'i answered him in al-Sunna wa-makanatuha fi al-tashri' al-islami, and Muhammad Abu Shahba in Difa' 'an al-Sunna. Abd al-Rahman al-Mu'allimi al-Yamani devoted a book-length reply, al-Anwar al-kashifa, specifically to Adwa' 'ala al-Sunna. The exchanges between Abu Rayyah and his critics form a central case study in Gautier Juynboll's monograph on the hadith debates of modern Egypt.

Abu Rayyah's critics argued that he confused tadlis with the accepted category of mursal al-sahabi (i.e., a Companion transmitting what he did not hear directly from the Prophet), that the collective probity (i.e., 'adala) of the Companions is a matter of scholarly consensus, and that his case against Ka'b al-Ahbar rested on attributions that the scholars of transmitter criticism did not accept, since authorities such as al-Dhahabi and Ibn Hajar al-Asqalani rated Ka'b as trustworthy. Brown observed that although reformers like Rida and Abu Rayyah identified genuinely provocative proof texts, their readings failed to persuade traditional scholars, who had long possessed interpretive frameworks for such material.

Abu Rayyah's work remains a standard reference point in modern debates over hadith authenticity, and refutations of his theses continue to appear in contemporary hadith scholarship.

== Works ==
- Adwa' 'ala al-Sunna al-Muhammadiyya (Cairo: Dar al-Ta'lif, 1958; later editions Cairo: Dar al-Ma'arif)
- Shaykh al-Mudira Abu Hurayra (later edition Beirut: Mu'assasat al-A'lami, 1993)
- Numerous articles in al-Risala magazine (1943–1951)

== See also ==
- Islamic modernism
- Rashid Rida
- Criticism of hadith
