= Mohammad Najeeb Qasmi =

Indian Sunni Islamic scholar

Mawlānā Muhammad Najeeb Qasmi Sambhali
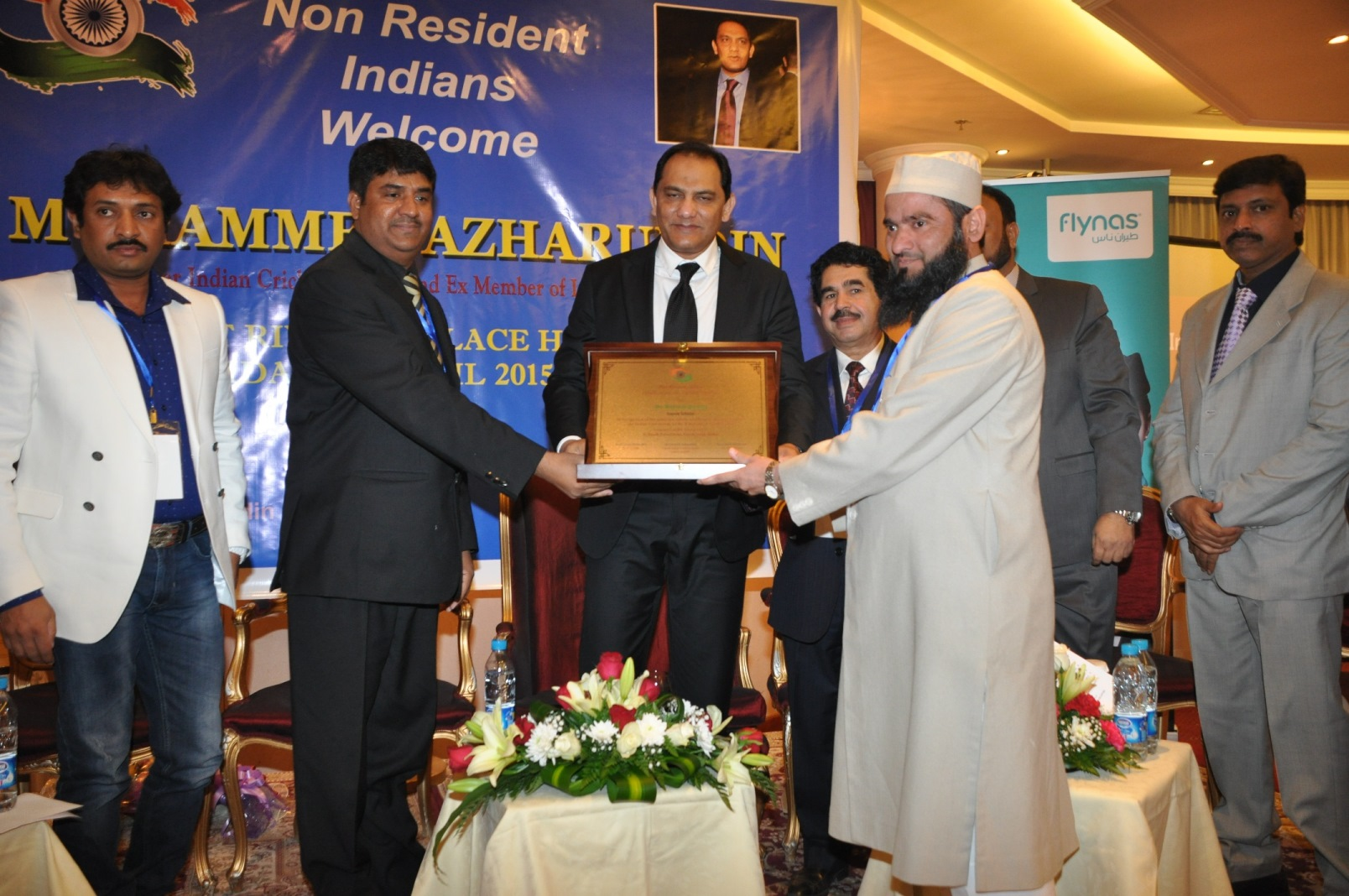
- Qasmi receiving memento from former Indian Cricket Team Captain Mohammad Azharuddin on 8 April 2015

Personal life
- Education: Darul Uloom Deoband, Jamia Millia Islamia, Delhi University

Religious life
- Religion: Islam
- Founder of: Al-Noor Public School, Sambhal
- Jurisprudence: Hanafi
- Movement: Deobandi

Muslim leader
- Awards: Watan Ke Ratna Award 2019
- Website: najeebqasmi.com

Mohammad Najeeb Qasmi Sambhali is an Indian Sunni Islamic scholar who established Al-Noor Public School, Sambhal. He is an alumnus of Darul Uloom Deoband, Delhi University and the Jamia Millia Islamia. He has authored Dars-e-Hadith, Dars-e-Quran, Islahi Mazameen, Journey to Madina, Qur'an and Hadith - Main Sources of Islamic Ideology and Umrah Ka Tariqah

== Biography ==
Mohammad Najeeb Qasmi is a grandson of Ismail Sambhali who was a hadith scholar and an activist of the Indian Independence movement. Ismail Sambhali was professor of hadith at the Madrasa Shahi in Moradabad and his students include Athar Mubarakpuri and Nizamuddin Asir Adrawi. Najeeb Qasmi studied traditional dars-e-nizami at the Darul Uloom Deoband and graduated from there in 1994. He received a B.A. from Jamia Millia Islamia and an M.A in Arabic from the Delhi University. He completed his doctoral studies at the Jamia Millia Islamia.

Qasmi established Al-Noor Public School in Sambhal, Uttar Pradesh on 21 December 2018. The foundation stone was laid down by teachers of the Darul Uloom Deoband and Jamia Millia Islamia. His articles have appeared in Monthly al-Bayyinat of Jamia Binoria and in Jahan-e-Urdu. His articles regularly appear in The Inquilab, The Munsif Daily, The Siasat Daily, Urdu Times, Avadhnama and other Indian and Pakistani newspapers like Daily Jang and Daily Express. He also writes on his website, which was released in a function held in Riyadh on 4 January 2013 by a number of Indian scholars. Saudi Gazette in its report called the website a brain child of Qasmi. At the launch program, Qasmi said, "Given the popularity of the Internet, many new websites with Islamic names are launched regularly, misinterpreting Islamic teachings. This website provides reliable Islamic content for users". He launched Hajj-e-Mabroor application to help provide accurate information about Hajj and Umrah. It was released in 2015 in by Muhammad Mustafa Azmi. The application has articles, books and videos of Qasmi in English, Hindi and Urdu covering various aspects of Hajj and Umrah. In 2019, Qasmi was conferred with the Watan Ke Ratna Award.

== Literary works ==
Qasmi's set of 38 books was released by Muhammad Mustafa Azmi whilst his six books were released in Ansari auditorium of Jamia Millia Islamia (JMI) by the former VC of JMI, Talat Ahmad, Akhtarul Wasey and Abul Qasim Nomani. His books include:

- Dars-e-Hadith
- Dars-e-Quran
- Islahi Mazameen (released by Akhtarul Wasey)
- Journey to Madina
- Qur'an and Hadith - Main Sources of Islamic Ideology
- Umrah Ka Tariqah
