= Shireen Dalvi =

Shireen Dalvi (or Shirin Dalvi; born 1971 or 1972) is an Indian journalist and editor.

Dalvi is a Konkani Muslim and has two children.

In 2011 she received a lifetime achievement from Maharashtra's Sahitya Akademi for her literary and journalistic contributions to the Urdu language. She returned the award in 2018 to protest the national government's Citizenship (Amendment) Act.

In 2014, she became the editor of the new Mumbai edition of the newspaper Avadhnama—the only women editor of an Urdu-language newspaper at that time. In 2015, Dalvi was arrested for reprinting controversial cartoons first published by Charlie Hebdo, following complaints and threats of protests from Rashtriya Ulema Council; she was later released on bail. Dalvi lost her job and the Mumbai edition was shut down by its publisher.
