= Hadith studies =

Modern academic study of the sayings and traditions of Muhammad

Hadith studies is the academic study of hadith, a literature typically thought in Islamic religion to be a record of the words, actions, and the silent approval of the Islamic prophet Muhammad as transmitted through chains of narrators.

A major area of interest in hadith studies has been the degree to which hadith can be used as a reliable source for reconstructing the biography of Muhammad, in parallel to the Islamic discipline of the hadith sciences. Since the pioneering work of Ignaz Goldziher, the consensus has been that hadith are a more faithful source for understanding the religious, historical, and social developments in the first two centuries of Islam than they are a reliable record of Muhammad's life, especially concerning the formation of Islamic law, theology, and piety during the Umayyad and early Abbasid eras.

Among other reasons, historians are skeptical of understanding the historical Muhammad through hadith due to the late date for when the hadith compilations were made, the sentiment that their chains of transmission (isnad) were a secondary development, and the prevalence of falsified hadith. In addition, there has been skepticism concerning whether the methods of the hadith sciences can reliably discriminate between authentic and inauthentic hadith. Despite this, recent methodological developments by scholars like Harald Motzki have shown that some hadith can be traced as early as the late seventh or early eighth century.

While hadith studies was preoccupied with the question of authenticity during the twentieth century, the scope of the field today has broadened to address questions such as what role hadith played in the intellectual and social histories of Muslim societies.

== Emergence of hadith ==
=== Hadith and Sunnah ===
The earliest schools and scholars of Islamic law—starting around a century and a half after the death of Muhammad—did not all agree on the importance of prophetic sunnah and its basis, the basis for which was the group of hadith ultimately attributed to Muhammad and his followers. Opinion ranged from prophetic hadith being one source of law among others (such as caliphal tradition or reports going back to Muhammad's followers), as was held by the ahl al-raʿy to outright rejection of hadith on the basis of their potentially tenuous historicity, as was held by the ahl al-kalām (referred to by some as "speculative theologians").

=== Hadith canonization ===
A sizable shift in practice in favor of the tradition of prophetic hadith and its basis for Islamic law (fiqh) came with al-Shāfiʿī (767–820 CE), founder of the Shafi'i school of law. According to this school of thought, prophetic hadith override all other hadith. It is unlikely that consensus yet existed for this view at this time as Shafi'i would come to spend great effort on establishing and promulgating his views over other ones. For those who criticized the reliability of hadith on the basis of their long phase of oral transmission, al-Shafi'i responded by arguing that God's wish for people to follow Muhammad's example would result in God ensuring the preservation of the tradition. Sunnah became a source of divine revelation (wahy) and the basis of classical Islamic law (Sharia), especially in consideration of the brevity dedicated to the subject of law in the Quran (which, for example, does not comment in detail on ritual like Ghusl or Wudu, or salat, the correct forms of salutations, and the importance of benevolence to slaves.) Al Shafi'is advocacy played a decisive role in elevating the status of hadith although some skepticism along that of earlier lines would continue.

=== Hadith authentication and collection ===
Once (authentic) hadith had attained their elevated status among the group inspired by al-Shafi'i who sought to establish Islamic practice on the basis of the Sunnah (Muhammad's deeds and sayings), the focus shifted amongst advocates of this group (who were called the ahl al-sunnah, or the "People of the Sunnah") to delineating between reliable or "sound" (ṣaḥīḥ) with unreliable hadith. The field that arose to meet this need came to be known as the hadith sciences (ʻilm al-ḥadīth), and this practice had entered into a mature stage by the 3rd century of Islam. (Note: The last compiler of the six Sunni Kutub al-Sittah to die, al-Nasa'i, passed on in 303 AH, 915 CE; some of the classical the Shia The Four Books were compiled later; Al-Shafiʿi had died in the middle of the second century) The hadith sciences helped undergird the triumph of Al-Shafi'is prioritization of prophetic hadith which became the primary sources of Islamic law and also became "ideological" tools in political/theological conflicts.

A challenge the hadith sciences had to confront was the massive scale of hadith forgery, (Note: According to Ibn Rawandi, "the danger inherent in this criticism is that it leads Muslims who accept it to the fatally dangerous conclusion that the body of Hadith is not the sayings of the Prophet and therefore does not carry his authority: [quoting Hossein Nasr] 'In this way one of the foundations of divine law and a vital source of guidance for the spiritual life is destroyed. It is as if the whole foundation were pulled from underneath the structure of Islam'".) with Muhammad al-Bukhari claiming that only ~7,400 narrations of 600,000 he investigated met his criteria for inclusion. Even among those 7,400, a large fraction were variants of the same report, but with a different chain of transmitters (isnad). (Note: (Experts, in general, have estimated the number of full-isnad narration at 7,397; eliminating those hadith with the same or only slightly different content, but with different chains of narrators, reduces the number to approximately 2,602.)) The criteria for establishing the authenticity (sihha) of hadith came down to corroboration of the same report but from different transmitters, assessing the reliability and character of the transmitters listed in the chain (although Muhammad's companions, the sahaba, were excluded from this as their association with Muhammad immediately guaranteed their character and competence), and the lack of gaps in the chain. By implication, defects in hadith might assumed to be associated with the lack of character (ʿadāla) or competence (ḍābiṯ) of its transmitters. It was also thought that such faulty transmitters could be identified and that the isnad was a direct reflection of the history of transmission of a tradition. Evaluation rarely looked at the content (matn) of a narration as opposed to its isnad. (Note: although examining the content of the hadith (matn) was "not entirely unknown".) Ultimately, evaluations of hadith remained haphazard between authors until the practice of the hadith sciences was standardized by Ibn al-Salah in the 13th century. It is through the lenses of this framework, supplemented by some additional work from Al-Dhahabi in the 14th century and Ibn Hajar al-Asqalani in the 15th century, that Muslim scholars since understood the discipline.

The first collections to be accepted as authoritative among Sunnis by the tenth century CE were the Sahihayn, referring to Sahih al-Bukhari and Sahih Muslim. Even as the set of canonical texts grew, the Sahihayn remained the core of the canon, with Sahih al-Bukhari typically being viewed as the most pre-eminent of the two. The tenth century CE also saw the inclusion of another two collections to form a Four-Book canon, including the Sunan Abi Dawud and Sunan al-Nasa'i. This grew into a Five-Book canon in the twelfth century, when Sunan al-Tirmidhi was added. In the same century, the modern Six-Book canon, known as the Kutub al-Sittah, emerged. Depending on the list, the sixth canonical book was the Sunan ibn Majah, the Sunan of Al-Daraqutni, or the Muwatta of Malik ibn Anas.

== Reliability of hadith ==
=== Lateness of prophetic attribution ===
Also throwing doubt on the doctrine that common use of hadith of Muhammad goes back to the generations immediately following his death is historian Robert G. Hoyland, who quotes acolytes of two of the earliest Islamic scholars:

- "I spent a year sitting with Abdullah ibn Umar (d.693, son of the second Caliph, who is said to be the second most prolific narrator of ahadith, with a total of 2,630 narrations) and I did not hear him transmit anything from the prophet";
- "I never heard Jabir ibn Zayd (d. ca. 720) say 'the prophet said ...' and yet the young men round here are saying it twenty times an hour".

Hoyland states that during Umayyad times only the central government was allowed to make laws; religious scholars began to challenge this by claiming they had been transmitted hadith by Muhammad. Al-Sha'bi, a narrator of hadith, when hearing of this, criticizes people who just go around narrating many prophetic hadiths without care by saying he never heard from Umar I's son ‘Abdallah any hadith from Muhammad except just one. Hoyland vindicates Islamic sources as accurately representative of Islamic history. Gregor Schoeler writes:

"He [Hoyland] shows that they [non-Islamic sources] are hardly suitable to support an alternative account of early Islamic history; on the contrary, they frequently agree with Islamic sources and supplement them."

The creation of politically convenient hadith proliferated. Even in the present day, and in the buildup to the first Gulf War, a "tradition" was published in the Palestinian daily newspaper Al-Nahar on December 15, 1990, reading: "and described as currently in wide circulation`", and it quotes Muhammad as predicting that "the Greeks and Franks will join with Egypt in the desert against a man named Sadim, and not one of them will return". (Note: David Cook notes the "tradition was" not the only one that appeared around the time of the Gulf War. He translates the story: "Believing tongues these days are passing around an unknown tradition, whether it proceeded from the great Messenger [Muhammad] or not. An examination of [whether] the source is trustworthy and the transmitters reliable has occurred, and until now a large number of religious authorities have refused to confirm or deny the reliability of this tradition, [that it] came from the Messenger [of God] Muhammad. The tradition says: ‘The Messenger of God said: "The Banu al-Asfar [white people], the Byzantines and the Franks [Christian groups] will gather together in the wasteland with Egypt[ians] against a man whose name is Sadim [i.e., Saddam]-- none of them will return. They said: When, O Messenger of God? He said: Between the months of Jumada and Rajab [mid-November to mid- February], and you see an amazing thing come of it".’ " The hadith is "unknown" and of course turned out to be very untrue, but uses terms "Byzantines" and "Frank" used in early Islam. The date given—December 15, 1990—was after the anti-Sadam Hussein "coalition" forces had mobilized but before the war had been fought.))

=== Isnads ===
Reza Aslan quotes Schacht's maxim: `the more perfect the isnad, the later the tradition`, which he (Aslan) calls "whimsical but accurate".

Isnads are thought to have entered usage three-quarters of a century after Muhammad's death, before which hadith were transmitted haphazardly and anonymously. Once they began to be used, the names of authorities, popular figures, and sometimes even fictitious figures would be supplied. Over time, isnads would be polished to meet stricter standards. Additional concerns are raised by the substantial percentages of hadith that traditional critics are reported to have dismissed and difficulties in parsing out historical hadith from the vast pool of ahistorical ones. This perspective casts doubt on traditional methods of hadith verification, given their presupposition that the isnad of a report offers a sufficiently accurate history of its transmission to be able to verify or nullify it and the prioritization of isnads over other criteria like the presence of anachronisms in a hadith which might have an isnad that passes traditional standards of verification.

=== Biographical evaluation ===
Another criticism of isnads was of the efficacy of the traditional Hadith studies field known as biographical evaluations (ʿilm al-rijāl)—evaluating the moral and mental capacity of transmitters/narrators. John Wansbrough argues that the isnads are should not be accepted, because of their "internal contradiction, anonymity, and arbitrary nature": specifically the lack of any information about many of the transmitters of the hadith other than found in these biographical evaluations, thus putting into question whether they are "pseudohistorical projections", i.e. names made up by later transmitters.

=== Effectiveness of hadith sciences ===
In general, historians have cast doubt on the historicity and reliability of hadith for several reasons, including that the hadith sciences. The following problems have been identified in hadith science methodology:

1. Arose long after hadith and isnads had originated and become widespread
2. Often relied on vague or unspecified argumentation and criteria
3. Produced a highly contradictory collection of texts
4. Authenticated many hadith containing anachronism or manifestly false content
5. Involves circular reasoning
6. Often relied on intuition
7. Involved motivated reasoning that, in turn, produced "a consequent denial of, disregard for, or even obfuscation of inexpedient evidence".

== Common-link theory ==
Common-link theory is an approach in hadith studies which seeks to identify the origins or earlier versions of hadith by comparing reports that have the same content (matn) but have different chains of transmission (isnads). If the chains of transmission converge on a single figure, then that figure may be taken as the original collector or fabricator of the tradition, depending on one's approach or conclusion. Common-link theory originated in the works of Joseph Schacht and G.H.A. Juynboll.

In his 1950 book The Origins of Muhammadan Jurisprudence, Schact introduced the concept of the "Common Link" (CL) to refer to the earliest point at which multiple chains of transmission (isnads) intersect. For Schact, the CL was equivalent to the point of origins of the tradition. Later, G.H.A. Juynboll would elaborate on and systematize earlier applications of common-link theory. Importantly, he introduced the notion of a Partial Common Link (PCL), which represents points of convergence of multiple isnads taking place among transmitters located after the common link themselves. In other words, a group of traditions may converge at one transmitter, and that transmitter's version of a tradition may converge among yet other versions at what is ultimately the common link.

While Schact believed that the common link was a legitimate purveyor of the tradition in question, Juynboll introduced the idea of a "seeming" CL or PCL, meaning that while several isnads may converge at a particular common link, the common link itself may be artificial. In reality, several isnads may have been fabricated and, in this case, a particular transmitter only turns up as a common link because several later figures falsely attributed the same tradition back to them. It is up to the investigator to determine if a CL or PCL is authentic, and Juynboll argued that the historical plausibility of a common-link is raised the more PCLs converge on it.

Another term Juynboll introduced into common-link theory was a "spider"; this refers to single strands of transmission that completely bypass the CL of many other versions of a report in finding their way to the original figure believed to have conveyed the tradition. Juynboll sees such "spiders" as fabricated isnads. Juynboll referred to attempts to create isnads bypassing the CL or PCL as "dives".

Direct forerunners to the ICMA approach, involving the combined study of the isnad and matn, included Jan Kramers' 1953 article "Une tradition à tendance manichéenne" and Josef van Ess in his 1975 volume Zwischen Ḥadīṯ und Theologie. The formal development of ICMA would only come with the work of Harald Motzki, Gregor Schoeler, and Andreas Görke in the 1990s.

=== Isnad-cum-matn analysis ===
In the 1990s, hadith historians developed a method known as isnad-cum-matn analysis (ICMA) as an alternative approach compared with traditional hadith sciences towards identifying the origins and developmental stages of hadith traditions. ICMA was invented twice independently in two publications that came out in 1996, one by Harald Motzki and the other by Schoeler. The primary advocate of ICMA in the initial stages of the development and application of the method was Motkzi; Motzki believed that the oral transmission of hadith would result in a progressive divergence of multiple versions of the same original report along different lines of transmitters. By comparing them to pinpoint shared wording, motifs and plots, the original version of a hadith that existed prior to the accrual of variants among different transmitters may be reconstructed. In addition, Motzki believed that a comparative study of the differences between reports could enable the identification of particular manipulations and other alterations. Put another way, ICMA seeks to date and trace the evolution of hadith by identifying how variation in the text or content (matn) of a hadith correlates with the variation in the listed chain of transmitters (isnād) across multiple versions of the same report.

== History of the field ==
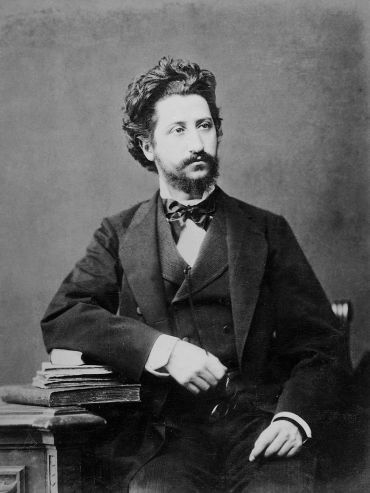
Ignác Goldziher

Modern academic study of hadith began with Ignác Goldziher (1850–1921), especially in the second volume of his work Muslim Studies (1890), and Joseph Schacht (1902–1969), in his Origins of Muhammadan Jurisprudence (1950). (Note: Earlier European scholars who expressed skepticism of the hadith system were Aloys Sprenger (1813-1893) and William Muir (1819-1905)) The general sentiment has been that hadith do not constitute a reliable corpus of sources that go back to the historical Muhammad. This includes the body of legal hadith, which was hard to trace back to a time before the end of the first century after the death of Muhammad. According to Wael B. Hallaq, as of 1999 scholarly attitude in the West towards the authenticity of hadith has taken three approaches:

since Schacht published his monumental work in 1950, scholarly discourse on this matter (i.e., the issue of authenticity) has proliferated. Three camps of scholars may be identified: one attempting to reconfirm his conclusions, and at times going beyond them; another endeavoring to refute them and a third seeking to create a middle, perhaps synthesized, position between the two. Among others, John Wansbrough, and Michael Cook belong to the first camp, while Nabia Abbott, F. Sezgin, M. Azami, Gregor Schoeler and Johann Fück belong to the second. Motzki, D. Santillana, G.H. Juynboll, Fazlur Rahman and James Robson take the middle position.

These figures believed that forgery began very early and such forged material went on to contaminate what would be collected into the authentic group of hadith, (Note: "In truth the Hadith must be regarded with marked scepticism, so far as it is used as a source for the life of Mohammed. The forgery or invention of traditions began very early. The Companions were not always too scrupulous to clothe their own opinions in the form of anecdotes ... These natural tendencies were magnified by the party spirit which early became rife in Islam. Each party counted among its adherents immediate followers of Mohammed. Each was anxious to justify itself by an appeal to his words and deeds. It is only the natural result that traditions with a notoriously party bias were circulated at an early day. A traditionist of the first rank admits that pious men were inclined to no sort of fraud so much as to the invention of traditions ... From our point of view, therefore, many traditions, even if well authenticated to external appearance, bear internal evidence of forgery.") with only a small number of hadith actually originated with Muhammad or his followers. (Note: "... European critics hold that only a very small part of the ḥadith can be regarded as an actual record of Islam during the time of Mohammed and his immediate followers. It is rather a succession of testimonies, often self contradictory, as to the aims, currents of thought, opinions, and decisions which came into existence during the first two centuries of the growth of Islam. In order to give them greater authority they are referred to the prophet and his companions. The study of the ḥadith is consequently of the greater importance because it discloses the successive stages and controlling ideas in the growth of the religious system of Islam.") In his Muslim Studies, Goldziher states: "it is not surprising that, among the hotly debated controversial issues of Islam, whether political or doctrinal, there is not one in which the champions of the various views are unable to cite a number of traditions, all equipped with imposing isnads".

== Reception of the field ==
=== Traditionalist response ===
Against critics claims that oral transmission of hadith for generations allowed corruption to occur, conservatives argue that it is not oral transmission that is unreliable but written transmission. In fact oral transmission was "superior to isolated written documents" which had "little value" unless "attested by living witnesses". In contrast, the reliability of oral transmission was "assured by the remarkable memories of the Arabs".

Orthodox Muslims do not deny the existence of false hadith, but believe that through the work of hadith scholars, these false hadith have been largely eliminated. Al-Shafi'i himself, the founder of the proposition that "sunna" should be made up exclusively of specific precedents set by Muhammad passed down as hadith, argued that "having commanded believers to obey the Prophet" (citing Quran 33: 21), "God must certainly have provided the means to do so."

=== Academics in Turkey ===
Academic hadith studies in modern times is usually viewed unfavorably amongst scholars with more traditional inclinations or Muslim scholars operating out of madrasas. In Turkey, the first favorable reference to Western scholarship on hadith came from Zakir Kadiri Ugan (d. 1954), titled ‘Dinî ve Gayri Dinî Rivayetler’ (‘Religious and Non-Religious Narrations’), published in the Turkish journal Dârülfünûn İlâhiyat Fakültesi Mecmuası which operated from 1925 to 1933. This paper also represented the only significant academic work on hadith from Turkey in its time. Ugan criticized the lack of analysis of the content (matn) of hadith in traditional work, and criticized the doctrine of the 'collective probity of the Companions' (taʿdīl al-ṣaḥābah) as leading to an undue acceptance of the reliability of Muhammad's followers.

Academic hadith work would be continued later by Muhammed Tayyib Okiç (d. 1977), who also established the tafsir and hadith faculties at Ankara University. Okiç did not believe that Western criticism was absolutely impartial, but he did believe that there were some who were moderate and unbiased. Henri Lammens was biased but, for Okiç, Ignaz Goldziher, was objective. He encouraging his students to familiarize themselves with Western work and the languages. One of his students, Talât Koçyiğit, went on to translate four papers by James Robson (d. 1981) into Turkish and critiqued Goldziher in one article. Koçyiğit also believed that some critics were impartial but took a dimmer view of Goldziher.

Okiç's other student, Mehmed Said Hatiboğlu, followed Goldziher's conclusions and had limited qualms with the majority of hadith academics. Hatiboğlu influenced later modernist scholars who went on to establish the journal İslamiyat (1998–2007) and two publishing houses. In the second half of the 20th century, the Faculty of Theology at Ankara trained a generation of scholars that engaged with and in Western hadith studies. Works by Wellhausen, Goldziher, Schacht, and Montgomery Watt were translated into Turkish. The number of theology faculties grew and, by 2017, there were 81 accepting students. This sizable growth concurrently led to a sizable growth of students in academic hadith and Islamic studies. Considerable translation of Western works occurred in turn, with several theses beginning to appear on the phenomena of Western academic studies, and a broader engagement with Western work in general.

Today, the main camps can be divided into "Istanbul-based traditionalists; Ankara-based modernists; and finally Kur’ancılar (Ahl al-Qurʾān)" where the primary points of contention are the Sunnah (and its relevance to modern times) and the authenticity of hadith. The primary issue voiced by traditionalists is that rejections of the authority of the historicity of hadith will cause future generations to abandon the Sunnah; modernists rebut that this concern stems from a misunderstanding of the mission of Muhammad leading to an acceptance of statements attributed to him that could not be true.
