= Matn =

Matn (Arabic: متن, lit. 'body, text') is an Islamic term that is used in relation to Hadith terminology. It means the text of the hadith, excluding the isnad.

== Use ==
A hadith is made of both an isnad (chain of transmission) and a matn.

A hadith would typically adopt the following formula:

"It was related to me by A, on the authority of B, on the authority of C, on the authority of D, from E (here a companion of Muhammad) that the Prophet said: '...' -and the matn would follow.

The matn would most often come in the form of an injunction, proverb, aphorism, brief dialogue or anecdote whose sense might apply to a range of new contexts.

=== Shi'a use ===
The Shi'a science of hadith outright rejects any hadith that contradicts the Qur'an. This is due to what they perceive as instructions from the Prophet Muhammad, the Shi'a Imam, and from the Qur'an itself, which says:

We have revealed the Book to you explaining clearly everything, and a guidance and mercy and good news for those who submit. (16:89)

== See also ==
- Isnad-cum-matn analysis
