= Muslim Studies (book) =

Book in hadith studies

Muhammedanische Studien, or in its English title, Muslim Studies, is a seminal and founding two-volume work in the field of Islamic studies by Ignác Goldziher (1850–1921), originally published in German in 1889–1890, and translated into English from 1966 to 1971 by C.R. Barber and S.M. Stern.

The first volume focuses on the reaction of Islam to Arab tribal societies, the reaction of Islam to the nationalities of the territories conquered early on (primarily the Persians), and finally the reactions of newly conquered peoples, especially the Persians, to emerging notions of Arab supremacy (especially as manifested by the shuʿūbiyya). The second and most well-known volume is a study on the development of hadith. This study is prominent in the field of hadith studies for being the first academic work to seriously introduce the view that the hadith are not a reliable source for the biography of Muhammad. A final and third essay occurs at the end of the second volume, on the role of the cult of saints in early Islam.

Muslim Studies has been said to have launched a "paradigm shift" in Islamic studies and Goldziher's studies on hadith as a whole have been called the "crown jewel" of his work in this field.

== Overview ==
=== Volume 1 ===
The first volume of Golziher's Muslim Studies focused on tensions between Arab and non-Arab Muslims in early Islamic history, as well as the shuʿūbiyya movement. Around the same time, Goldziher also published a separate paper in the journal Zeitschrift der Deutschen Morgenländischen Gesellschaft about the shuʿūbiyya in Al-Andalus in the 11th century AD, with a special focus on the figure Ibn Gharsiya. As a reaction to sentiments of Arab supremacy, the shuʿūbiyya arose as a political faction and a genre of literature, especially among elements emphasizing Persian nationalism, that expressed the opposite: that non-Arabs were superior to Arabs. According to Goldziher, the non-Arabs and their traditions were depicted positively and used to contrast against the more negatively portrayed lifestyle and traditions of the Arabs.

=== Volume 2 ===
The second volume of Muslim Studies concerned the history, origins, and development of the hadith literature. In contrast to earlier approaches, Goldziher thought to fundamentally rethink the origins of hadith and the role they can play as a source for Islamic history. Contrary to the traditional position (including how it had been taken in by the academics of his time), Goldziher did not believe that hadith stretched back to the time of Muhammad or the years that followed his death, but instead emerged in the second Islamic century in the context of the political and theological aspirations, debates, controversies, and polemics of the second Islamic century. Therefore, Goldziher underlined the utility of hadith in regards to their previously acknowledged, but greatly informative nature about the intellectual and social history of the Islamic religion during a still early, but more matured phase of it. Holtzman and Ovadia write, summarizing Muslim Studies:

In his monumental Muhammedanische Studien (published in 1888–1890, two years after Ueber Geberden), Goldziher devoted the majority of the second volume to an exploration of the development of the ḥadīth literature. Approaching the ḥadīth as the reservoir of Arab memory, Goldziher noted that in his reading method "the Hadith will not serve as a document for the history of the infancy of Islam, but rather as a reflection of the tendencies which appeared in the community during the mature stages of its development." Goldziher saw the ḥadīth as "the typical product of the religious spirit of the epoch." By "the epoch" Goldziher meant the first century of Islam, when "[t]he pious cultivated and disseminated in their orders the little that they had saved from early times or acquired by communication." He adds: "They also fabricated new material for which they could expect recognition." As is well known, the fabrication of ḥadīth material, which is broadly discussed in Muhammedanische Studien, became a cornerstone of Goldziher’s perception of the formation of the ḥadīth. This perception, however, does not contradict Goldziher’s basic approach to the ḥadīth as "a rich source for the intellectual history of early Islam and a record of how Muslims sought to establish their sense of self-identity as individuals and as a community of faith." And indeed, when he writes about gestures in the ḥadīth, his approach is clearly non-skeptical: He does not criticize the sources but conveys their content faithfully.

== Impact and reception in Islamic studies ==
While Goldziher's own work focused on the hadith literature, Joseph Schacht extended his findings to Islamic law (Shariah) in a seminal publication of his own, the Origins of Muhammadan Jurisprudence (1950).

Among academics of hadith in Turkey, Goldziher's work has been one of the primary loci of engagement with respect to the Western study of hadith, among those who are either generally in agreement or in disagreement with its conclusions.

Although less influential, the first volume of Muslim Studies was also an important contribution to Islamic studies, being the first to tackle questions of hierarchical versus egalitarian tendencies in early Islam, as well as the first serious study of the shuʿūbiyya, both as a movement and as a genre of literature. In the twentieth century, some parts of Goldziher's analysis were criticized by the Arabist H.A.R. Gibb (d. 1971) and Roy Mottahedeh. For Gibb, Goldziher had overemphasized the Persian element of the shuʿūbiyya. Mottahedeh believed that Goldziher (a Hungarian Jew) was reading contemporary Hungarian national problems into the history of the shuʿūbiyya, especially with respect to how the Hungarian nationalism of his time was posing an enlarging threat to local Jewish population from the end of the 19th century onwards. But for Mottahedeh, this was anachronistic: nationalism as an ideology only emerges in the 19th century. In response, Larsson has defended Goldziher, arguing that there is nothing in his works to suggest that his argument or thought emerged from or was related to concerns of contemporary nationalism.
