= Isnad =

Chain of narrators who have transmitted the Hadith

In the Islamic study of hadith, an isnād (chain of transmitters, or literally "supporting"; Arabic: اِسْناد) is a list of people who passed on a tradition, from the original authority to whom the tradition is attributed to, to the present person reciting or compiling that tradition. The tradition an isnad is associated with is called the matn. Isnads are an important feature of the genre of Islamic literature known as hadith and are prioritized in the process that seeks to determine if the tradition in question is authentic or inauthentic.

According to the traditional Islamic view, the tradition of the hadith sciences has succeeded in the use of isnads to distinguish between authentic and inauthentic traditions going back to Muhammad and his companions. The contemporary view in modern hadith studies, however, is that isnads were commonly susceptible to forgery and so had to be scrutinized before being used to guarantee the transmission of a tradition.

== Pre-Islamic background ==
Chains of transmission are found in many religious texts as an oral guarantor for the preservation of tradition (by contrast, written transmission was perceived to be unreliable). These include sources from rabbinic, Christian (including Papias, Ephrem, and the Pseudo-Clementine Homilies), and Manichaean backgrounds. In Christian circles, a criterion for authoritative transmission was that it would begin with an apostle and pass through a series of bishops. Apostolic succession is the belief that the leadership of the Church has occurred through continuous transmission going back to the apostles, which legitimizes traditions by extension of the authority of Jesus and the disciples. This practice has been compared to the Islamic idea of attributing the transmission of a tradition through a line of known tradents. These methods of transmission likely arose independently.

Joseph Horowitz proposed that the Islamic version of the practice of combining a tradition or saying with a chain of transmitters going back to an original authority stems from the instance of this tradition in rabbinic literature from whence it got adopted into the nascent hadith sciences, before it underwent a much more elaborate native systematization in the Islamic tradition. According to Michael Cook:

We can then go on to find elements in the Islamic edifice that look like specific borrowings from Judaism ... the chain of transmitters that accompanies an oral account, known on the Muslim side as the isnād, as in "Muḥammad ibn Yūsuf informed us from Sufyān from Abū ʾl-Zinād from Mūsā ibn Abī ʿUthmān from his father from Abū Hurayra from the Prophet who said..." The only other religious culture in which we find such a style of attribution is Judaism, as in “Rabbi Zeriqa said: Rabbi Ammi said: Rabbi Simeon ben Laqish said:...” What was different was that once adopted in Islam the practice was developed much more systematically and applied to a much wider range of material.

One Jewish chain of transmission is reiterated in the Quran (5:44).

== Origins in Islam ==
A number of propositions have been made concerning the time that isnads began to be used in conjunction with the passing on of tradition in the Islamic world. One of the most common pieces of evidence considered in these discussions is in a statement that has been attributed to the Basran scholar Ibn Sirin (d. 110/728 AD), which states:

Lam yakūnū yas’alūna ‘an al-isnād. Fa-lammā waqa‘at al-fitna qālū: "Sammū la-nā rijāla-kum fa-yunẓaru ilā ahl al-sunna fa-yu’khadhu ḥadīthu-hum wa-yunẓaru ilā ahl al-bida‘ fa-lā yu’khadhu ḥadīthu-hum."
They were not asking about the isnād. When the fitna (civil war) broke out, they said, "name to us your informants (rijāl), so that we can recognize the people of [orthodox] tradition and accept their ḥadīth, and recognize the people of [heretical] innovation and accept not their ḥadīth."

According to this tradition, the use of isnads begins with the era of the fitna. However, this term is ambiguous, and so much scholarly debate has concerned the meaning of fitna in this passage, as it could be taken as a reference to the First Fitna (656–616 AD) (the view of Muhammad Mustafa Azmi), the Second Fitna (680–692) (the view of G.H.A. Juynboll), or the Third Fitna (744–750) (the view of Joseph Schacht, only possible if the tradition has been misattributed to, and therefore post-dates, Ibn Sirin). Since Juynboll, who has observed that the earliest sources most commonly associate the use of this word in isolation with the Second Fitna, it has become increasingly accepted that the tradition in question localizes the beginnings of the use of isnads to the era of the Second Fitna. Furthermore, Juynboll's assessment has alleviated the skepticism towards the question of whether Ibn Sirin made this claim.

Therefore, isnads emerged in the Islamic tradition in the late first Islamic century. This occurred during the beginnings of efforts to offer systematic support for collected traditions. In this early stage, however, isnads were still not systematically invoked. The pivotal figure in the emergence of traditions concerning the Prophetic biography, Urwa ibn al-Zubayr, used isnads, but not consistently. Later on, as the hadith sciences emerged and were formalized, they were documented more rigidly.

== Reliability ==
In contemporary hadith studies, isnads have been subjected to a heightened level of scrutiny, and virtually all authorities believe that isnads have been afflicted with higher levels of partial or complete forgery than had been commonly presumed. Complete forgeries would constitute a wholesale invention of an isnad, whereas partial forgery typically involves fabricating a list of early transmitters of a tradition to connect it with a figure of higher prestige, such as Muhammad himself or one of his reputable followers. One of the most skeptical instances of modern views on isnads comes from the influential writings of Joseph Schacht (d. 1969), who, in his Origins of Muhammadan Jurisprudence (1950), argued that isnads were sweepingly fabricated towards the end of the second Islamic century. For Schacht, isnads "grew backwards", meaning that over time, the tradition was attributed to earlier and earlier authorities until they reached back to Muhammad. According to this view, as the hadith sciences developed and increasingly prioritized complete Prophetic isnads (without any missing links and going back to Muhammad) in the post-150 AH period, there was a growing incentive to modify or forge isnads to meet these criteria. Isnads recorded in this era but do not meet these criteria are therefore more likely to be real, as they had not been furnished and shaped according to the emerging editorial standards of hadith scholars (muhaddithin). This view has materialized in Schacht's oft-quoted maxim: "the more perfect the isnad, the later the tradition".

Today, isnads are thought to have entered usage three-quarters of a century after Muhammad's death, before which hadith were transmitted haphazardly and anonymously. Once they began to be used, the names of authorities, popular figures, and sometimes even fictitious figures would be supplied. Over time, isnads would be polished to meet stricter standards. Additional concerns are raised by the substantial percentages of hadith that traditional critics are reported to have dismissed and difficulties in parsing out historical hadith from the vast pool of ahistorical ones. This perspective casts doubt on traditional methods of hadith verification, given their presupposition that the isnad of a report offers a sufficiently accurate history of its transmission to be able to verify or nullify it and the prioritization of isnads over other criteria like the presence of anachronisms in a hadith which might have an isnad that passes traditional standards of verification.

== Isnad-cum-matn analysis ==
In the 1990s, hadith historians developed a method known as isnad-cum-matn analysis (ICMA) as an alternative approach compared with traditional hadith sciences towards identifying the origins and developmental stages of hadith traditions. ICMA was invented twice independently in two publications that came out in 1996, one by Harald Motzki and the other by Schoeler. The primary advocate of ICMA in the initial stages of the development and application of the method was Motkzi; Motzki believed that the oral transmission of hadith would result in a progressive divergence of multiple versions of the same original report along different lines of transmitters. By comparing them to pinpoint shared wording, motifs and plots, the original version of a hadith that existed prior to the accrual of variants among different transmitters may be reconstructed. In addition, Motzki believed that a comparative study of the differences between reports could enable the identification of particular manipulations and other alterations. Put another way, ICMA seeks to date and trace the evolution of hadith by identifying how variation in the text or content (matn) of a hadith correlates with the variation in the listed chain of transmitters (isnād) across multiple versions of the same report.
