= Avadhnama =

Indian Urdu and Hindi language newspaper

Avadhnama اودھ نامہ
- Type: Daily newspaper
- Format: Broadsheet
- Owner: Avadhnama Group of Publications
- Language: Urdu, Hindi
- Headquarters: Lucknow, India
- Website: www.avadhnama.com/

Avadhnama (Urdu: اودھ نامہ) is a popular Urdu and Hindi language newspaper serving major cities in the region of Awadh in India, including the cities of Lucknow, Aligarh, Ayodhya, Saharanpur, Kanpur and Azamgarh. The newspaper is available both in print and online.

== See also ==
- List of newspapers in India
