= Muhammad Mustafa Azmi =

Indian-born Saudi Arabian hadith scholar (1930–2017)

Muhammad Mustafa Al-A‘zami
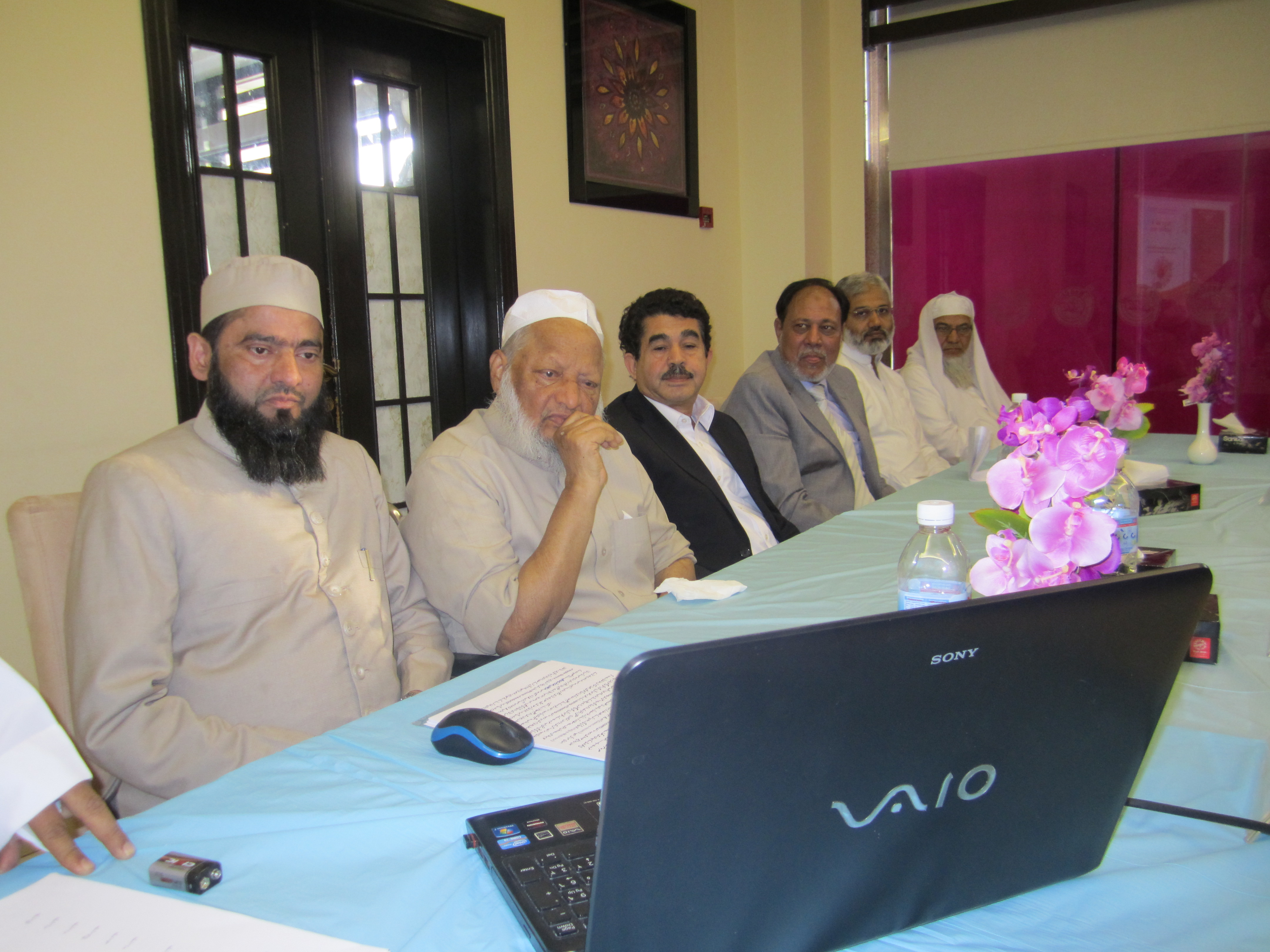
- Azmi (second from the left) while launching 39 electronic books of Mohammad Najeeb Qasmi

Personal life
- Born: 1930 Mau, United Provinces, British India (present-day Uttar Pradesh, India)
- Died: 20 December 2017 (aged 86-87) Riyadh, Saudi Arabia
- Resting place: Al-Rajhi Mosque, Riyadh
- Education: Darul Uloom Deoband; Al-Azhar University; University of Cambridge
- Occupation: Muhaddith

Religious life
- Religion: Islam

Muslim leader
- Awards: King Faisal International Award in 1980 (Islamic Studies Branch)

Muhammad Mustafa Al-A'zami (Arabic: محمد مصطفى الأعظمي; 1930 – 20 December 2017) was an Indian-born Saudi Arabian contemporary hadith scholar best known for his critical investigation of the theories of fellow Islamic scholars Ignác Goldziher, David Margoliouth, and Joseph Schacht.

== Life and education ==
He was born in Mau, India then in the Azamgarh district (hence his nisba) in the early part of the year 1930. Al-A'zami received his education successively at Darul Uloom Deoband (1952), Al-Azhar University (M.A., 1955), and the University of Cambridge in the United Kingdom (Ph.D., 1966).

Muhammad Mustafa Azmi died on 20 December 2017, aged 87.

== Career ==
Azmi was a Professor Emeritus at King Saud University where he also chaired the department of Islamic Studies. He served as curator of the National Public Library of Qatar, Associate Professor at Umm al-Qura University, visiting scholar at the University of Michigan (Ann Arbor), Visiting Fellow at St Cross College, Oxford, King Faisal Visiting Professor for Islamic Studies at Princeton University, and visiting scholar at the University of Colorado at Boulder. He was also an Honorary Fellow in Islamic Studies at the University of Wales, Trinity Saint David.

== Awards and recognition ==
In 1980, he was the recipient of the King Faisal International Award for Islamic Studies. Much of A'zami's work focused on challenging Western scholarship on hadith literature, especially on highlighting the fact that there was already intense literary activity on hadiths during the lifetime of the Muslim prophet Muhammad, at his encouragement.

== Literary works ==
- Studies in Early Hadith Literature, His doctoral thesis at the University of Cambridge
- Hadith Methodology and Literature, a general introduction to the subject
- The History of the Qur'anic Text from Revelation to Compilation: A Comparative Study with the Old and New Testaments
- On Schacht's Origins of Muhammadan Jurisprudence
- Dirasat fi al-Hadith an-Nabawi
- Kuttab an-Nabi
- Manhaj an-Naqd 'ind al-Muhaddithin
- al-Muhaddithun min al-Yamamah

His forthcoming works include The Qurʾānic Challenge: A Promise Fulfilled and The ʾIsnād System: Its Origins and Authenticity.

=== Edited works ===
- al-ʿIlal of Ibn al-Madini
- Kitāb at-Tamyiz of Imam Muslim
- Maghāzi Rasulullah of Urwah ibn Zubayr
- Muwatta Imam Malik
- Sahih Ibn Khuzaymah
- Sunan ibn Majah

== See also ==
- List of Deobandis

== Bibliography ==
- الشيخ محمد مصطفى الأعظمي ومساهمته العلمية في الحديث النبوي
- الشيخ محمد مصطفى الأعظمي ومساهماته العلمية في مجال الحديث النبوي: دراسة استقرائية
- Muhammad Mustafa Azamis Contribution to and hadith Literature and his Critique of Orientalists
