= Daniel W. Brown =

Western scholar of Islamic Studies

Daniel W. Brown is the author of the books A New Introduction to Islam (in its 3rd edition as of 2017), Rethinking Tradition in Modern Islamic Thought (1999). As of 2020 is under contract to write Muhammad Iqbal, (Makers of the Muslim World series) and is the editor of The Wiley Blackwell Concise Companion to the Hadith - Wiley Blackwell Companions to Religion (2020). He became Director of the Institute for the Study of Religion in the Middle East (ISRME) in Istanbul in 2011 and remains so as of 2020.

Brown was born and spent his first 18 years in Pakistan. He received a PhD in Islamic Studies in 1993 and has done research or been a visiting professor at Islamic Research Institute, (Islamabad); Cairo University, Cairo; Mount Holyoke College; Smith College; and the Institute for Middle East Studies, Arab Baptist Theological Seminary, Beirut.
