= Aloys Sprenger =

Austrian orientalist

Aloys Sprenger (born 3 September 1813, in Nassereith, Tyrol; died 19 December 1893 in Heidelberg) was an Austrian Orientalist.

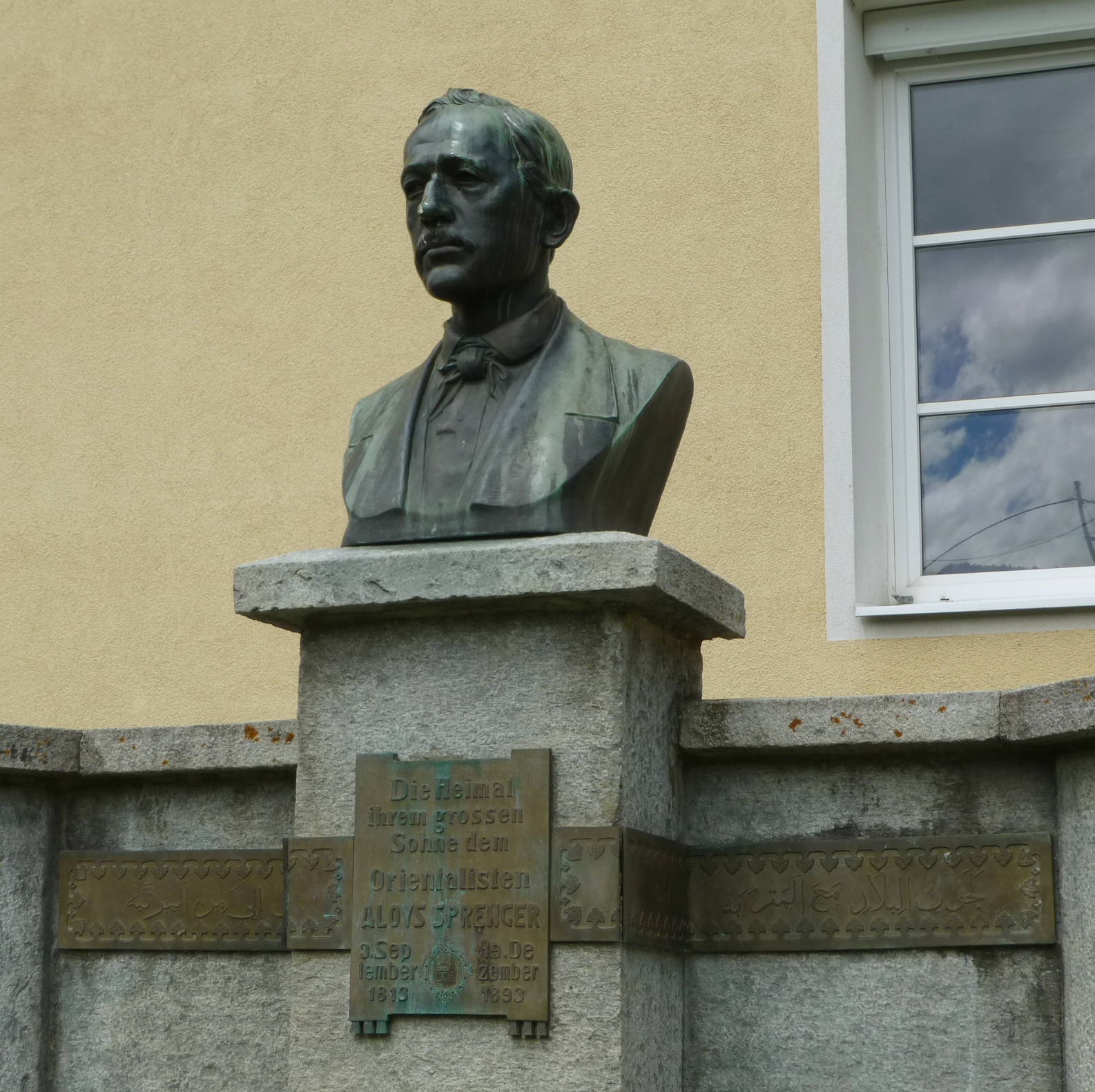
Bust in Nassereith.

Sprenger studied medicine, natural sciences as well as oriental languages at the University of Vienna. In 1836 he moved to London, where he worked with the Earl of Munster on the latter's Geschichte der Kriegswissenschaften bei den mohammedanischen Völkern, ‘History of Military Science among the Muslim Peoples’, and thence in 1843 to Calcutta, where he became principal of Delhi College. In this capacity he had many textbooks translated into Hindustani from European languages.

In 1848 he was sent to Lucknow, to prepare a catalogue of the royal library there, the first volume of which appeared in Calcutta in 1854. This book, with its lists of Persian poets, its careful description of all the chief works of Persian poetry and its valuable biographical material, became a worthy guide for the exploration of Persian literature.

In 1850 Sprenger was named examiner, official government interpreter, and secretary of the Asiatic Society of Calcutta. He published many works while holding this latter position, among them "Dictionary of the Technical terms used in the sciences of the Musulmans" (1854) and "Ibn Hajar's biographical dictionary of persons who knew Mohammed" (1856).

Sprenger took a position as professor of oriental languages at the University of Bern in 1857, moving in 1881 to Heidelberg. His voluminous collection of Arabic, Persian, Hindustani and other manuscripts and printed material was eventually acquired by the Berlin State Library.

== Bibliography ==
- Otby’s history of Mahmud of Ghaznah (Arabic, Delhi 1847)
- Notices of some Copies of the Arabic Work Entitled “Rasàyil Ikhwàm al-Cafâ” (Arabic, Journal of the Asiatic Society of Bengal, Calcutta 1848)
- El-Mas'ū dī’s Meadows of Gold and Mines of Gems (Transl., London 1849, Vol. 1)
- The Gulistân of Sady (Persian, Calcutta 1851)
- The Life of Muḥammad (Presbyterian Mission Press, Allahabad 1851).
- A Catalogue of the Arabic, Persian and Hindûstâny Manuscripts, of the Libraries of the King of Oudh, Compiled under the Orders of the Govt. of India Vol. 1, containing Persian & Hindûstâny poetry. (Calcutta 1854)
- Dictionary of the Technical Terms used in the Sciences of the Musulmans. (Calcutta 1854)
- Soyuti’s Itqân on the Exegetic Sciences of the Qoran in Arabic. (Calcutta 1856)
- Ibn Hajar’s Biographical Dictionary of Persons Who Knew Mohammed. (Calcutta 1856)
- Das Leben und die Lehre des Mohammed. Nach Bisher Größtenteils Unbenutzten Quellen. (Reprint of the German edition, Berlin 1861; Olms, Hildesheim 2003)
1. ISBN 3-487-12021-6
2. ISBN 3-487-12022-4
3. ISBN 3-487-12023-2
4. ISBN 3-487-12024-0
- A catalogue of the Bibliotheca Orientalis Sprengeriana. (Printed by W. Keller, Gießen 1857)
- Post- und Reiserouten des Orients. (Reprint of the German edition, Leipzig 1864; Institut für islamisch-arabische Geschichte, Frankfurt am Main. 1993)
- Die alte Geographie Arabiens als Grundlage der Entwicklungsgeschichte des Semitismus (Bern 1875)
- Babylonien, das reichste Land in der Vorzeit und das lohnendste Kolonisationsfeld (Heidelberg 1886)

== Literature ==
- Norbert Mantl (Editor): Aloys Sprenger, der Orientalist und Islamhistoriker aus Nassereith in Tirol. Selbstverlag der Gemeinde (self-published by the municipality), Nassereith 1993
- Meyers Konversationslexikon, public-domain encyclopaedia entry on Aloys Sprenger, on which this article (and its German-language counterpart) is based.
