= Isnad-cum-matn analysis =

Study of the development of hadith

Isnād-cum-matn analysis (ICMA) is a method in hadith studies that seeks to date hadith by identifying how variation in the text or content (matn) of a hadith correlates with the variation in the listed chain of transmitters (isnād) across multiple versions of the same report. ICMA enables a construction of a chronology of the textual development and transmission of hadith reports by reconstructing older versions and dating them on the basis of the time at which the transmitters of older versions were active; this may also allow for a reconstruction of the original version of a tradition at the common link of the versions of the tradition found across multiple sources.

Some consider ICMA the most reliable method at-present for studying hadith and the literature on the subject has become "vast" with the method being employed on a wide-scale since the second half of the 1990s. More recently, ICMA has been combined with form criticism, textual criticism, and geographical analysis to more exactly pinpoint the origins and dissemination of the tradition beyond the reconstructed version at the common link, which when applied alone, is the temporal limit of how early a source can be dated by ICMA. In addition, these developments enable a reconstruction of the wording of the Urtext (or the original wording) of the tradition at the common link, as opposed to prior approaches, which were only able to reconstruct the gist of the tradition at the common link.

== Methodology ==
=== Procedure ===
The method of performing an ICMA can be described in a five-step process:

1. Exhaustively identify all versions of a hadith across hadith collections.
2. Construct a diagram to visualize the transmission process based on the reported isnads. Identify Common Links and Partial Common Links.
3. Inspect whether the Common Link is authentic. This is done by performing an extensive synoptic comparison between the texts of each version of a report and how they vary.
4. Having completed identifying the variants, attempt to identify a correlation across the variants in the texts and the chains of transmission.
5. If (4) is successful in establishing a correlation, the original wording of the report may be possible to reconstruct. Detailed criteria have been proposed by some authors with respect to this reconstruction effort. Once this is done, the original version can be compared to the versions of the report that emerged across different subsequent transmitters to see who introduced which variants into the report.

=== Falsifiability ===
An important consideration among several historians has been how to validate or inspect the falsifiability of approaches based on ICMA. This would entail comparing the outcome of an ICMA analysis with an independent analysis of the history of the same tradition where high confidence can be placed in the timing of its origins and/or development.

=== Limitations ===
The method has several limitations, aside from the time-consuming process of conducting the ICMA itself. First, to produce the most reliable results, a tradition needs to have a large number of versions transmitted across many authorities. This requirement excludes the majority of hadith from being amenable to ICMA. Second, while the presence of variation in wording is important to conducting an ICMA, the "original" wording often cannot be entirely reconstructed in light of the variation. Third, hadith subject to ICMA analysis are still dated no earlier than sixty (or more) years after the events that they describe, usually from the Marwanid period onwards. The first Islamic century typically only reflects single strands of transmission, and common links occur more commonly among transmitters belonging to the third or fourth generation of Muslims. For this reason, ICMA only narrows the time gap between the events in question and when a narration entered into circulation. ICMA, by itself, cannot date traditions found in multiple sources earlier than their common link; it also remains controversial as to whether the common link should be seen as the origins of a tradition, and if not, how the version of the tradition in the common link should be related to prior versions of the tradition. Fourth, though the transmission up to a certain point can be verified using ICMA, the historicity of the narration in question cannot.

== Application ==
ICMA has been applied across a large number of hadith reports and traditions, including on traditions concerning the annexation of Damascus, the Raid of Hudhayl, the torture of ʿAmmār b. Yāsir, the letters of Urwa ibn al-Zubayr and more.

== History of scholarship ==
=== Background and common-link theory ===
Common-link theory is an approach in hadith studies which seeks to identify the origins or earlier versions of hadith by comparing reports that have the same content (matn) but have different chains of transmission (isnads). If the chains of transmission converge on a single figure, then that figure may be taken as the original collector of fabricator of the tradition, depending on one's approach or conclusion. Common-link theory originated in the works of Joseph Schacht and G.H.A. Juynboll. In his 1950 book The Origins of Muhammadan Jurisprudence, Schact introduced the concept of the "Common Link" (CL) to refer to the earliest point at which multiple chains of transmission (isnads) intersect. For Schact, the CL was equivalent to the point of origins of the tradition. Later, G.H.A. Juynboll would systematize earlier applications of common-link theory by elaborating a more consistent set of criteria and terminology. Importantly, he introduced the notion of a Partial Common Link (PCL), which represents points of convergence of multiple isnads taking place among transmitters located after the common link themselves. In other words, a group of traditions may converge at one transmitter, and that transmitters version of a tradition may converge among yet other versions at what is ultimately the common link. While Schact believed that the common link was a legitimate purveyor of the tradition in question, Juynboll introduced the terminology of a "seeming" CL (or PCL) for a concept that Schacht had established, referring to the idea that while several isnads may converge at a particular common link, the common link themselves may be artificial. In reality, several isnads may have been fabricated and, in this case, a particular transmitter only turns up as a common link because several later figures falsely attributed the same tradition back to them. It is up to the investigator to determine if a CL or PCL is authentic, and Juynboll argued that the historical plausibility of a common-link is raised the more PCLs converge on it. Another term Juynboll introduced into common-link theory was a "spider"; this refers to single strands of transmission that completely bypass the CL of many other versions of a report in finding their way to the original figure believed to have conveyed the tradition. Juynboll sees such "spiders" as fabricated isnads. Juynboll referred to attempts to create isnads bypassing the CL or PCL as "dives".

Direct forerunners to the ICMA approach, involving the combined study of the isnad and matn, included Jan Kramers' 1953 article "Une tradition à tendance manichéenne" and Josef van Ess in his 1975 volume Zwischen Ḥadīṯ und Theologie. The formal development of ICMA would only come with the work of Harald Motzki, Gregor Schoeler, and Andreas Görke in the 1990s.

=== Invention ===
ICMA was invented twice independently in two publications that came out in 1996, one by Harald Motzki (in an article where the name of the method was given) and the other by Schoeler. The primary advocate of ICMA in the initial stages of the development and application of the method was Motkzi; Motzki believed that the oral transmission of hadith would result in a progressive divergence of multiple versions of the same original report along different lines of transmitters. By comparing them to pinpoint shared wording, motifs and plots, the original version of a hadith that existed prior to the accrual of variants among different transmitters may be reconstructed. In addition, Motzki believed that a comparative study of the differences between reports could enable the identification of particular manipulations and other alterations.

== Terminology ==
The following list of terminology was largely developed by G.H.A. Juynboll and is taken from Little 2022.

strand
a segment of isnād, of any length

isnād bundle
a network of multiple, intersecting isnāds (which emerges or becomes visible when all of the isnāds for a given hadith are overlaid against each other)

single strand (SS)
a segment of an isnād that comprises a succession of individuals, or in other words: an isnād in which one tradent transmitted to only one other, etc.

key figure
any converged-upon tradent in an isnād bundle (i.e., a PCL, SPCL, CL, (S)CL, SCL, or spider)

partial common link (PCL)
a tradent who is converged upon by at least three non-SSs (i.e., direct collectors and/or other PCLs)

(seeming) partial common link ((S)PCL)
a tradent who is converged upon by only two non-SSs (i.e., direct collectors and/or other PCLs)

seeming partial common link (SPCL)
a tradent who is converged upon by a single non-SS (i.e., a direct collector or another PCL) and otherwise only SSs

common link (CL)
the earliest of those who are converged upon by PCLs when said PCLs are three or more in number

(seeming) common link ((S)CL)
the earliest of the tradents who are directly converged upon by PCLs, when said PCLs are only two in number

seeming common link (SCL)
the earliest of the tradents who are directly converged upon by PCLs, when said PCLs are only one in number and corroborated (in their transmission from the SCL) only by SSs

inverted common link (ICL)
a CL who cites a collective isnād or multiple strands as their source(s), such that they appear as a bottleneck in the overall isnād bundle.

dive
a (secondary, false) SS that specifically circumvents (i.e., "dives around") a PCL or CL.

spider
a network that converges upon a false CL

Since Juynboll, additional terms have been added by some historians to the repertoire:

key figure
a broader term referring to a CL, PCL, SCL, or SPCL

== See also ==
- Criticism of hadith
- Paleo-Arabic
