= Harald Motzki =

German-trained Islamic scholar (1948–2019)

Harald Motzki was born on August 25, 1948 in West Berlin, he grew up in a Catholic family as the son of Guenther and Brunhilde Motzki. Harald Motzki began his university studies focusing on comparative religion, Islamic studies, Old and New Testament studies, European history, Arabic, and Semitic languages. He received his doctorate in Islamic Studies in 1978 from the University of Bonn. He wrote on the transmission of hadith and was a professor of Islamic Studies at Nijmegen University (Radboud Universitet Nijmegen) in the Netherlands.

Motzki had been called by fellow scholar of Islam, Christopher Melchert, "the undisputed dean of hadith studies".

Motzki died on February 8, 2019.

== See also ==
- Islamic scholars
- History of Hadith

== Bibliography ==
- Reconstruction of a Source of Ibn Isḥāq’s Life of The Prophet and Early Qurʾān Exegesis (2017), Georgias Press. ISBN 978-14-63-20659-8
- Analyzing Muslim Traditions: Studies in Legal, Exegetical and Maghazi Hadith (2009) [with Nicolet Boekhoff-van der Voort and Sean W. Anthony) ISBN 978-90-04-18049-9
- Hadith: Origins and Developments (2004) ISBN 0-86078-704-4
- The Origins of Islamic Jurisprudence (2002) [with Marion H. Katz] ISBN 90-04-12131-5
- The Biography of Muhammad: The Issue of the Sources (2000), Brill Academic Pub ISBN 978-90-04-11513-2

== Festschrifts ==
- The Transmission and Dynamics of the Textual Sources of Islam: Essays in Honor of Harald Motzki, Brill Academic Pub.
