= G. H. A. Juynboll =

Gualtherüs (Gautier) Hendrik Albert Juynboll (1935–2010) was a scholar of Islam specializing in hadith (the collection of sayings attributed to the Prophet of Islam Muhammad), about which he published more than twenty articles. His contributions to hadith studies have been called "substantial and groundbreaking" (by Jonathan A. C. Brown), and he has been called "talented and tireless" (A. Kevin Reinhart); he was in 2020 the honorand of a Festschrift.

== Life ==
Juynboll was born in Leiden, Netherlands in 1935 and was from a "prominent" family of Orientalists. He studied Arabic and Islam at Leiden University and obtained his doctoral degree in 1969. He worked at the University of California, Los Angeles (UCLA) in the US, and the University of Exeter in the UK, but became "financially independent" in 1985.

He is noted for the contention that isnads (the chains of oral transmission of hadith) "tell us important things about the story to which the isnäd is attached". His developed important principles and terminology for the subsequent development of isnād-cum-matn analysis (ICMA).

== Works ==
A full bibliography of Juynboll's works has been published; his key publications were:

- Papers on Islamic History. Studies on the First Century of Islamic Society (Southern Illinois University Press, 1982)
- Muslim Tradition. Studies in Chronology, Provenance and Authorship of Early Hadith (Cambridge University Press, 1983)
- Studies on the Origins and Uses of Islamic Hadith (Routledge, 1996)
- Encyclopedia of Canonical Hadith (Brill, Leiden, 2007)
- History of Al-Tabari. Volume 13, the conquest of Iraq, Southwestern Persia, and Egypt translated by G.H.A. Juynboll. (SUNY Press, 1987)
