= Abu Sa'id al-Khudri =

7th-century Arabian and early Muslim

Abu Sa'īd al-Khūdrī al-Ansari
- أبو سعيد الخدري
- Born: c. 612 or 613; Yathrib (now Medina), Hejaz
- Died: c. 693 or 694; Medina, Hejaz, Umayyad Caliphate
- Burial place: Al-Baqi Cemetery, Medina
- Known for: Prolific hadith narrator and Ansari companion of Prophet Muhammad
- Arabic name
- Personal (Ism): Saʿd سعد
- Patronymic (Nasab): ibn Mālik ibn Sinān al-Khazrajī بْنُ مَالِكِ بْنِ سِنَانٍ الْخَزْرَجِيِّ
- Teknonymic (Kunya): Abū Saʿīd أَبُو سَعِيدٍ
- Toponymic (Nisba): al-Khudrī al-Anṣārī الخُدْرِيُّ الأَنْصَارِيُّ

Abū Saʿīd Saʿd ibn Mālik ibn Sinān al-Khazrajī al-Khudrī (Arabic: أبو سعيد سعد بن مالك بن سنان الخزرجي الخدري) was an early ally (Ansari) of the Islamic prophet Muhammad and one of the younger companions of the prophet, as well as being a supporter of Hadith prohibition.

Too young to fight at the Battle of Uhud in 625 where his father Malik ibn Sinan fell, he participated in subsequent campaigns. Although he traveled to Syria once to visit the Umayyad caliph Mu'awiya, he resided in Medina all his life. Later, he is said to have participated with his fellow Medinans in the defense of their city against the Umayyad army at the Battle of al-Harrah in 64/683. He is said variously to have died in 63/682, 64/683, 65/684, or 74/693.

Despite his withdrawal from broader hadith culture, Abu Said is found to be one of the most prolific narrators of hadith quoted in Sunni literature, with over 1170 narrations, making him the seventh most prolific Companion in the transmission of the hadith.

Shia Muslims do not categorically dismiss his narrations, but compare what he narrates with their own sources, as they believe his refusal to write hadiths to have been abused by many hadith narrators to fabricate many fanciful narrations, or to create justifications for practices not found from among the Ahl al-Bayt.

== Hadith attributed to him ==
The following quotations are from books of hadith. These books relate accounts taken from the life of the Islamic prophet Muhammad, his family, and his companions. They were compiled by Islamic scholars after Muhammad's death. These quotations include information about those who related the accounts, as well as the accounts themselves.

It was narrated from Abu Sa’id al-Khudri that the Messenger of Allah said: “Do not write anything from me; whoever has written anything from me other than the Qur’an, let him erase it and narrate from me, for there is nothing wrong with that.” (Narrated by Muslim, al-Zuhd wa’l-Raqa’iq, 5326)

Abu Sa'id al-Khudri reported that Muhammad said, "There is no gift better and wider than Ṣabr." from Sahih Bukhari and Sahih Muslim

Abu Sa'id al-Khudri narrates that Muhammad said, "He who fasts for a day in the Path of Allah, Allah will keep him away from Hell by a distance of seventy years of journey." from An-Nasa'i

Abu Sa'id al-Khudri narrated that Muhammad said, "The lasting good deeds are: (the saying of) La ilaha ilallah, Subhan Allah, Allahu Akbar, Alhamdulillah, and La hawla wa la quwwata illa billah." related from An-Nasa'i

Abu Saeed al Khudri reported that he heard Muhammad say, "While I was asleep, I dreamt that people are brought to me, all of them wearing shirts. Some of the shirts reached only up to the chest and some a little below the chest. Umar ibn al-Khattab was also brought to me. His shirt was so long that it trailed on the ground and he dragged it along as he walked." Some of the sahaba asked him its interpretation and he said, "Religion." from Sahih Bukhari and Muslim

== Narrations ==
- A narration concerning An-Nisa, 24
- A narration concerning Contraception

== See also ==
- Sunni view of the Sahaba
- List of Sahabah
