= United Submitters International =

Quranist-Islamic based in Arizona, US

The organisation United Submitters International (USI) founded by Khalifa has its center in Tucson, Arizona, United States. It has published a monthly newsletter with the title Submitter's Perspective since 1985. The movement popularised the phrase: "The Quran, the whole Quran, and nothing but the Quran. "Among those influenced by Khalifa's ideas include Edip Yüksel, Ahmad Rashad, and Supreme Court of Nigeria Judge, Isa Othman.

In the United States, at the end of the 20th century, the Egyptian Quranist Rashad Khalifa, who is known as the proponent of the Qur'an code (Code 19), which is a mathematical code in the Qur'an, developed a theological doctrine that influenced Quranists in many other countries. With the aid of computers, he performed a numerical analysis of the Qur'an that, according to his claims, demonstrated its divine origin. The number 19, which is mentioned in chapter 74 of the Qur'an as being "one of the greatest miracles" played the fundamental role, which according to Khalifa can be found everywhere in the structure of the Quran. Some objected to these beliefs and, in 1990, Khalifa was assassinated by someone associated with the Sunni group Jamaat ul-Fuqra.

A Turkish (of Kurdish descent) activist, Edip Yüksel, initially campaigned for a Quranist-Islamic revolution in Turkey, which is why he was imprisoned. Later he met Khalifa and joined the organisation after witnessing the "19 miracle". In 1989 he had to leave the country because of this and joined the headquarters in Tucson. Yüksel and two other authors created their own translation of the Quran. In some points, however, his views differ from those of Khalifa.
