= Hadith =

Collections of sayings and teachings of Muhammad

Hadith (Note: /ˈhædɪθ/ or /hɑːˈdiːθ/; Arabic: حديث, romanized: ḥadīṯ, Arabic pronunciation: [ħadiːθ]; pl. aḥādīth, أحاديث, ʾaḥādīṯ, (Note: The plural form of hadith in Arabic is aḥādīth, أحاديث, 'aḥādīth but hadith is used instead in this article.) Arabic pronunciation: [ʔaħaːdiːθ], lit. 'talk' or 'discourse') (Arabic: حديث) is the Arabic word for a 'report' or an 'account [of an event]' and refers to the Islamic oral tradition of anecdotes containing the purported words, actions, and silent approvals of the Islamic prophet Muhammad or his immediate circle (companions in Sunni Islam, Ahl al-Bayt in Shia).

These traditions initially circulated in early post-prophetic discussions, often without formal attribution. They began to be systematically compiled between the 7th and 10th centuries by Islamic scholars (muhaddiths), who organized them first according to the primary authority to whom they were attributed and subsequently by subject matter. In later traditions, each hadith is associated with a isnad, a lineage of people who reportedly heard and repeated the hadith from which the source of the hadith can be traced.

In the following centuries, hadith scholars established criteria to verify the authenticity of these narrations (Hadith sciences), with categories such as sahih ('authentic'), hasan ('good'), and da'if ('weak'). This process aimed to address and analyze contradictory or questionable statements within certain narrations. However, hadith classification developed into divergent lines, depending on surrounding cultural spheres where each sect established over time its own accredited corpus, and shaped by the presuppositions of religio-political divisions such as Sunni, Shia, and Kharijite. Differences in classification and interpretation paved the way for various Islamic schools of thought to adopt divergent approaches regarding their understanding and application of Sharia.

Hadiths are currently part of Sunnah, the Islamic body of traditions and practices. Hadiths gained importance in Islamic society over centuries over several distinct stages. Sunnah originally meant a tradition that did not contain the definition of good and bad. Later, "good traditions" began to be referred to as sunnah and the concept of "Muhammad's sunnah" was established, and Muhammad's sunnah gave way to the "hadiths of Muhammad".

Due to the gaining widespread respect in mainstream Islamic thought and its status as the second authority after the Quran, a significant portion of Sharia rules is derived from hadiths rather than the Quran. (Note: "The full systems of Islamic theology and law are not derived primarily from the Quran. Muhammad's sunnah was a second but far more detailed living scripture, and later Muslim scholars would thus often refer to Muhammad as 'The Possessor of Two Revelations'".) Throughout the history of early Islamic thought, there have been also approaches that question the authenticity, epistemological value, or capacity of hadiths to generate law or doctrine, and that limit or—either partially or entirely—reject them. These include the Kharijites, the Mu'tazila, certain early jurists (known as Ahl al-Ra'y, and theologians). Western critical scholarship participating in hadith studies categorically rejects the authenticity of hadith as an accurate record of the historical Muhammad.

Scholars argue that the relevant corpus does not reflect 7th-century reality; rather, it represents a retrospective projection of perspectives, manifesting through fabrications based on traditional systems of attribution, and shaped by the legal, theological, and political conflicts of the 8th to 10th centuries. Quranist Islam rejects the epistemic value of hadiths and does not attribute any sanctity to them.

== Terminology ==
In Arabic, the noun ḥadīth (حديث IPA: [ħæˈdiːθ]) means 'report', 'account', or 'narrative'. Its Arabic plural is aḥādīth (أحاديث [ʔæħæːˈdiːθ]). Hadith also refers to the speech of a person. Other terms used for the same purpose prior to hadith were as follows:

- Khabar (literally news, information, pl. akhbar) may be used as a synonym for hadith, but some scholars use it to refer to traditions about Muhammad's companions and their successors from the following generation, in contrast to hadith as defined as traditions about Muhammad himself. Another definition (by Ibn Warraq) describes them as "discrete anecdotes or reports" from early Islam that "include simple statements, utterances of authoritative scholars, saints, or statesmen, reports of events, and stories about historical events all varying in length from one line to several pages."
- Conversely, athar (trace, remnant) usually refers to traditions about the companions and successors, though sometimes connotes traditions about Muhammad.

In accordance with the prevailing understanding of the later era, knowledge based on transmitted reports was termed "Ilm" (knowledge/science), the gatherings where these reports were conveyed and classified were called "Majlis al-'Ilm" (assemblies of knowledge), and the resulting output was named as ʻilm al-ḥadīth i.e. hadith sciences.

== Definition / Evolution of the concept ==
In Islamic terminology, according to Juan Campo, the term hadith refers to reports of statements or actions of Muhammad, or of his tacit approval or criticism of something said or done in his presence. Classical hadith specialist Ibn Hajar al-Asqalani says that the intended meaning of hadith in religious tradition is something attributed to Muhammad, but that is not found in the Quran.

In contrast, according to the Shia Islam Ahlul Bayt Digital Library Project, "when there is no clear Qur'anic statement, nor is there a Hadith upon which Muslim schools have agreed. ... Shi'a ... refer to Ahlul-Bayt [the family of Muhammad] to derive the Sunnah of the Prophet, implying that while hadith is limited to the "Traditions" of Muhammad, the Shi'a Sunna draws on the sayings, etc. of the Ahlul-Bayt, i.e. the Imams of Shi'a Islam.

Hadith may be hadith qudsi (sacred hadith)—which some Muslims regard as the words of God—or hadith sharif (noble hadith), which are Muhammad's own utterances. According to as-Sayyid ash-Sharif al-Jurjani, the hadith qudsi differ from the Quran in that the former are "expressed in Muhammad's words", whereas the latter are the "direct words of God". A hadith qudsi need not be a sahih (sound hadith), but may be da'if (weak) or even mawdu' (fabricated).

An example of a hadith qudsi is the hadith of Abu Hurairah who said that Muhammad said:

When God decreed the Creation He pledged Himself by writing in His book which is laid down with Him: My mercy prevails over My wrath.

Non-prophetic hadith; Scholar Patricia Crone includes reports by others than Muhammad in her definition of hadith: "short reports (sometimes just a line or two) recording what an early figure, such as a companion of the prophet or Muhammad himself, said or did on a particular occasion, preceded by a chain of transmitters". However, she adds that "nowadays, hadith almost always means hadith from Muhammad himself." Joseph Schacht quotes a hadith of Muhammad that is used "to justify reference" in Islamic law to the companions of Muhammad as religious authorities—"My companions are like lodestars."

According to Schacht, (and other scholars) in the first generations after the death of Muhammad, use of hadith from Sahabah ("companions" of Muhammad) and Tabi'un ("successors" of the companions) "was the rule", while use of hadith of Muhammad himself by Muslims was "the exception". Schacht credits Al-Shafi'i—founder of the Shafi'i school of fiqh (or madh'hab)—with establishing the principle of the using the hadith of Muhammad for Islamic law, and emphasizing the inferiority of hadith of anyone else, saying hadith:

"... from other persons are of no account in the face of a tradition from the Prophet, whether they confirm or contradict it; if the other persons had been aware of the tradition from the Prophet, they would have followed it".

This led to "the almost complete neglect" of traditions from the Companions and others.

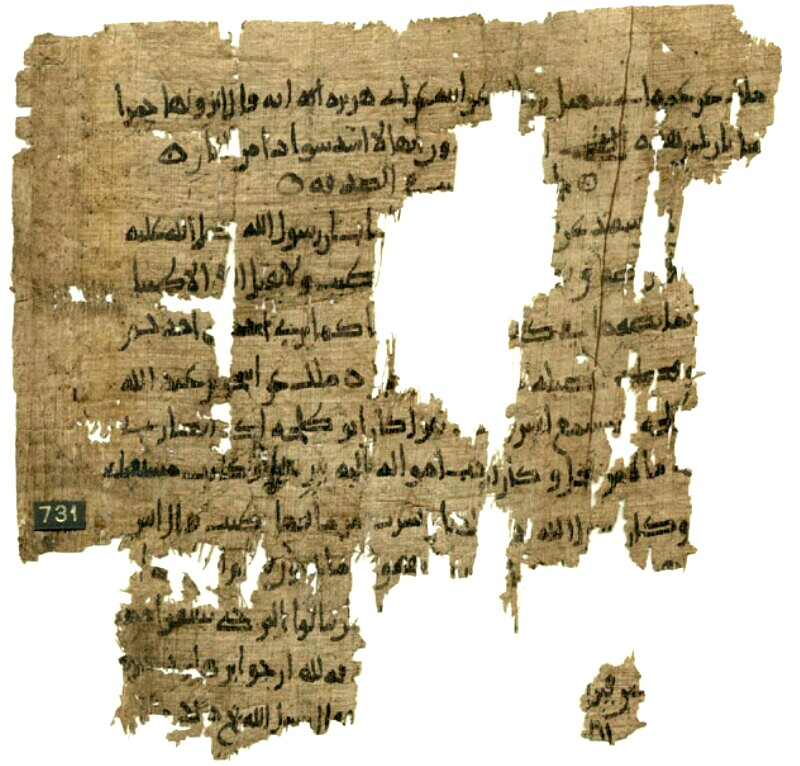
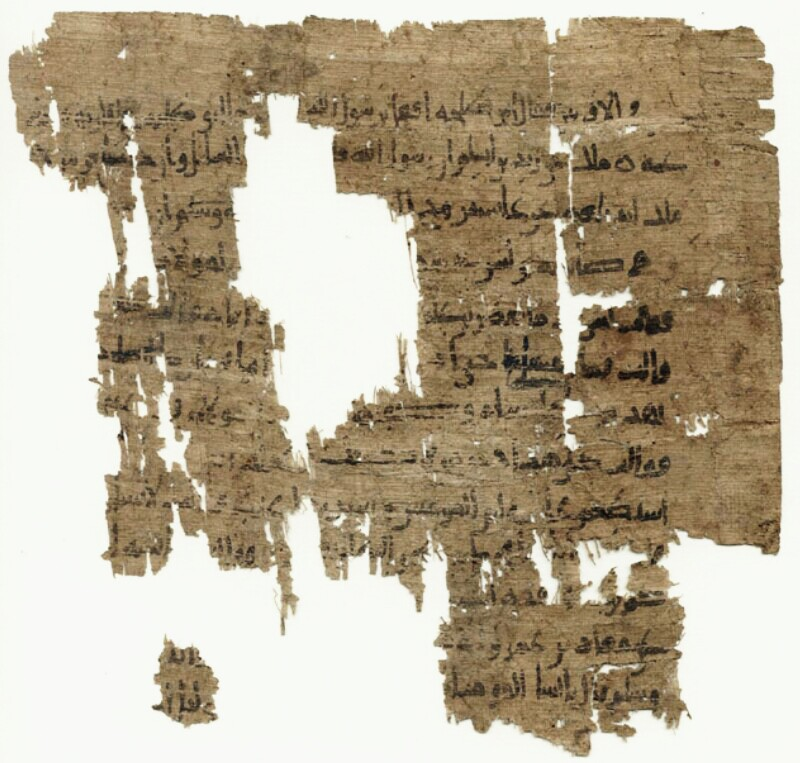
PERF No. 731, the earliest manuscript of Mālik's Muwaṭṭaʾ, dated to his own time. Recto (left) has the contents of Bāb al-Targib fī-Sadaqah, 795 AD.

Collections of hadith sometimes mix those of Muhammad with the reports of others. Muwatta Imam Malik is usually described as "the earliest written collection of hadith" but sayings of Muhammad are "blended with the sayings of the companions", (822 hadith from Muhammad and 898 from others, according to the count of one edition). In Introduction to Hadith by Abd al-Hadi al-Fadli, Kitab Ali is referred to as "the first hadith book of the Ahl al-Bayt (family of Muhammad) to be written on the authority of the Prophet". Hadith were classified as follows according to the last person to whom they were attributed in the chain of narration; the acts, statements or approvals of Muhammad are called "Marfu hadith", while those of companions are called "mawquf (موقوف) hadith", and those of Tabi'un are called "maqtu' (مقطوع) hadith".

=== Relationship with sunnah ===
The word sunnah is also used in reference to a normative custom of Muhammad or the early Muslim community. Joseph Schacht describes hadith as providing "the documentation" of the sunnah. Some sources (Khaled Abou El Fadl) limit hadith to verbal reports, with the deeds of Muhammad and reports about his companions being part of the sunnah, but not hadith.

Another source (Joseph A. Islam) distinguishes between the two saying:

Whereas the 'Hadith' is an oral communication that is allegedly derived from the Prophet or his teachings, the 'Sunna' (quite literally: mode of life, behaviour or example) signifies the prevailing customs of a particular community or people. ... A 'Sunna' is a practice which has been passed on by a community from generation to generation en masse, whereas the hadith are reports collected by later compilers often centuries removed from the source. ... A practice which is contained within the Hadith may well be regarded as Sunna, but it is not necessary that a Sunna would have a supporting hadith sanctioning it.

Sunnah originally meant a tradition (urf) that did not mean good or bad. Later, "good traditions" began to be referred to as sunnah in Islamic community and the concept of "Muhammad's sunnah" was established. Muhammad's sunnah gave way to the "hadiths of Muhammad" which were transmitted orally, then recorded in corpuses and systematized and purified within following centuries. Hadiths were later placed in a respected place among the sources of sharia in many Islamic sects, and thus replaced the sunnah in the establishment of sharia.

Islamic literary classifications similar to hadith (but not sunnah) are maghazi and sira. They differ from hadith in that they are organized "relatively chronologically" rather than by subject.

- Sīrat (literally 'way of going' or 'conduct'), biographies of Muhammad, written since the middle of the eighth century. Similar writings called maghazi (literally 'raid') preceded the sīrat literature, focusing on military actions of Muhammad, but also included non-military aspects of his life. Therefore, there is overlap in the meaning of the terms, although maghazi suggests military aspects rather than general biographical ones.

== Compilation and collections ==
The hadith literature in use today is based on spoken reports in circulation after the death of Muhammad. Hadith were not promptly written down during Muhammad's lifetime or immediately after his death. Hadith are oral cultural products consisting of words and deeds, the majority of which were documented several centuries after the time of Muhammad (Sunni sources, approximately 200–300 years and Shiite hadith books 400–500) and attributed to Muhammad through a chain of narrators over 1–2 mi away from where Muhammad is thought to have lived.

Different branches of Islam refer to different collections of hadith, although the same incident may be found in hadith from different collections. In general, the difference between Shi'a and Sunni collections is that Shia give preference to hadith attributed to Muhammad's family and close companions (Ahl al-Bayt), while Sunnis do not consider family lineage in evaluating hadith and sunnah narrated by any of twelve thousand companions of Muhammad.

=== Sunni ===
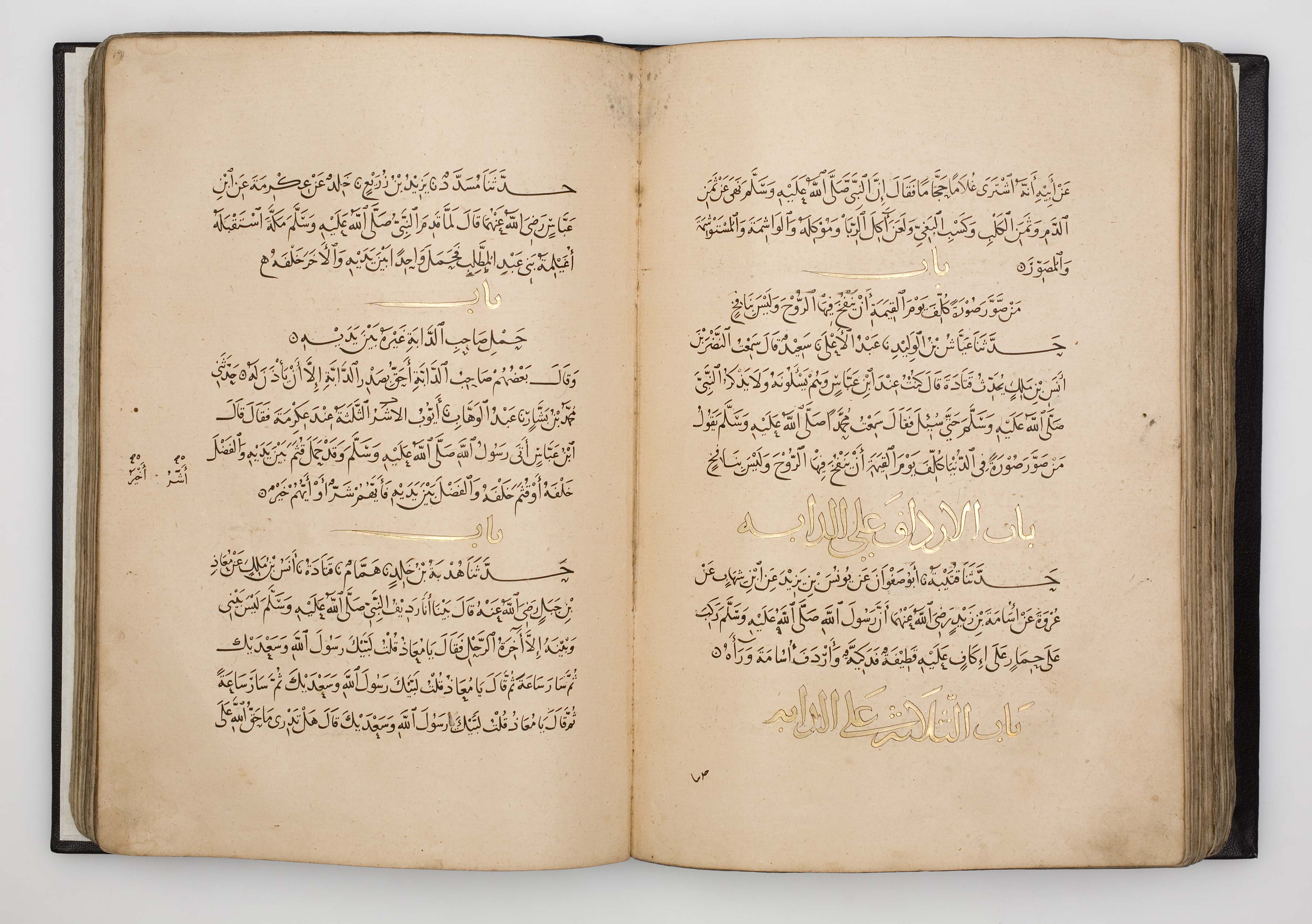
A 14/15th-century manuscript of Sahih al-Bukhari

- In the Sunni branch of Islam, the canonical hadith collections are the six books, of which Sahih al-Bukhari and Sahih Muslim generally have the highest status. The other books of hadith are Sunan Abu Dawood, Jami' al-Tirmidhi, Al-Sunan al-Sughra and Sunan ibn Majah. However the Malikis, one of the four Sunni "schools of thought" (madhhabs), traditionally reject Sunan ibn Majah and assert the canonical status of Muwatta Imam Malik.

=== Shia ===
- In the Twelver Shi'a branch of Islam, the canonical hadith collections are the Four Books: Kitab al-Kafi, Man la yahduruhu al-Faqih, Tahdhib al-Ahkam, and Al-Istibsar.
- The Ismaili shia sects use the Da'a'im al-Islam as their hadith collection.

=== Ibadi ===
- In the Ibadi branch of Islam, the main canonical collection is the Tartib al-Musnad. This is an expansion of the earlier Jami Sahih collection, which retains canonical status in its own right.

=== Others ===
- Some minor groups, collectively known as Quranists, reject the authority of the hadith collections altogether.

== Authentication ==
The two major aspects of a hadith are the text of the report (the matn), which contains the actual narrative, and the chain of narrators (the isnad), which documents the route by which the report has been transmitted. The isnad was an effort to document that a hadith actually came from Muhammad, and Muslim scholars from the eighth century to the present have never ceased to repeat the mantra "The isnad is part of the religion—if not for the isnad, whoever wanted could say whatever they wanted." The isnad literally means "support", and it is so named because hadith specialists rely on it to determine the authenticity or weakness of a hadith. The isnad consists of a chronological list of the narrators, each mentioning the one from whom they heard the hadith, until mentioning the originator of the matn along with the matn itself.

The first people to hear hadith were the companions who preserved it and then conveyed it to those after them. Then the generation following them received it, thus conveying it to those after them and so on. So a companion would say, "I heard the Prophet say such and such." The Follower would then say, "I heard a companion say, 'I heard the Prophet.'" The one after him would then say, "I heard someone say, 'I heard a Companion say, 'I heard the Prophet ...''" and so on.

Authenticity of a hadith is primarily verified by its chain of transmission (isnad) in classical Islam. Because a chain of transmission can be a forgery, the status of authenticity given by Muslim scholars are not generally accepted by Orientalists or historians, who largely consider hadith to be unverifiable. Ignác Goldziher demonstrated that several hadith do not fit the time of Muhammad chronologically and content-wise. As a result, Orientalists generally regard hadith as having little value in understanding the life and times of the historical Muhammad but are instead valuable for understanding later theological developments in the Muslim community. According to Bernard Lewis, "In the early Islamic centuries there could be no better way of promoting a cause, an opinion, or a faction than to cite an appropriate action or utterance of the Prophet." To fight these forgeries, the elaborate tradition of hadith sciences was devised to authenticate hadith known as ilm al jarh or ilm al dirayah Hadith science use a number of methods of evaluation developed by early Muslim scholars in determining the veracity of reports attributed to Muhammad. This is achieved by:

- the individual narrators involved in its transmission,
- the scale of the report's transmission,
- analyzing the text of the report, and
- the routes through which the report was transmitted.

Based on these criteria, various classifications of hadith have been developed. The earliest comprehensive work in hadith science was Abu Muhammad al-Ramahurmuzi's al-Muhaddith al-Fasil, while another significant work was al-Hakim al-Naysaburi's Ma‘rifat ‘ulum al-hadith. Ibn al-Salah's ʻUlum al-hadith is considered the standard classical reference on hadith science. Some schools of Hadith methodology apply as many as sixteen separate tests.

In the Shia school of thought, there are two fundamental viewpoints of hadith: The Usuli view and the Akhbari view. The Usuli scholars emphasize the importance of scientific examination of hadith through ijtihad while the Akhbari scholars consider all hadith from the four Shia books as authentic .

=== Biographical evaluation ===
Biographical analysis (‘ilm al-rijāl, lit. "science of people", also "science of Asma Al-Rijal or ‘ilm al-jarḥ wa al-taʻdīl", lit. "science of discrediting and accrediting"), in which details about the transmitter are scrutinized. This includes analyzing their date and place of birth; familial connections; teachers and students; religiosity; moral behaviour; literary output; their travels; as well as their date of death. Based upon these criteria, the reliability (thiqāt) of the transmitter is assessed. It is also determined whether the individual was actually able to transmit the report, which is deduced from their contemporaneity and geographical proximity with the other transmitters in the chain. Examples of biographical dictionaries include: Abd al-Ghani al-Maqdisi's Al-Kamal fi Asma' al-Rijal, Ibn Hajar al-Asqalani's Tahdhīb al-Tahdhīb and al-Dhahabi's Tadhkirat al-huffaz.

=== Scale of transmission ===
Hadith on matters of importance needed to come through a number of independent chains, this was known as the scale of transmission. Reports that passed through many reliable transmitters in many isnad up until their collection and transcription are known as mutawātir. These reports are considered the most authoritative as they pass through so many different routes that collusion between all of the transmitters becomes an impossibility. Reports not meeting this standard are known as aahad, and are of several different types.

=== Analyzing text ===
According to Muhammad Shafi, Hadith whose isnad has been scrutinized then have their text or matn examined for:

- contradiction of the Quran;
- contradiction of reliable hadith;
- making sense, being logical;
- being a report about the importance of an individual (or individuals) transmitted only through their supporters or family, and which is not supported by reports from other independent channels.

=== Accreditation terminology (Admissibility) ===
Having been evaluated, hadith may be categorized. Two categories are:

- ṣaḥīḥ (sound, authentic),
- ḍaʿīf (weak)

Other classifications include:

- ḥasan (good), which refers to an otherwise ṣaḥīḥ report suffering from minor deficiency, or a weak report strengthened due to numerous other corroborating reports;
- mawḍūʿ (fabricated),
- munkar (denounced), which is a report that is rejected due to the presence of an unreliable transmitter contradicting another more reliable narrator.

Both sahīh and hasan reports are considered acceptable for usage in Islamic legal discourse.

== Impact ==
The hadith have been called by American-Sunni scholar Jonathan A. C. Brown as "the backbone" of Islamic civilization. Much of the early Islamic history available today is also based on the hadith, although it has been challenged for its lack of basis in primary source material and the internal contradictions of available secondary material.

The hadith had a profound and controversial influence on tafsir (commentaries of the Quran). The earliest commentary of the Quran known as Tafsir Ibn Abbas is sometimes attributed to the companion Ibn Abbas. "Many thousands of times" more numerous than the verses of the Quran, hadith have been described as resembling layers surrounding the "core" of Islamic beliefs (the Quran). Well-known, widely accepted hadith make up the narrow inner layer, with a hadith becoming less reliable and accepted with each layer stretching outward.

The hadith were used the form the basis of sharia (the religious law system forming part of the Islamic tradition), and fiqh (Islamic jurisprudence). The hadith are at the root of why there is no single fiqh system, but rather a collection of parallel systems within Islam. Some important elements, which are today taken to be a long-held part of Islamic practice and belief are not mentioned in the Quran, but are reported in hadith. The reports of Muhammad's (and sometimes his companions') behavior collected by hadith compilers include details of ritual religious practice such as the five salat (obligatory Islamic prayers) that are not found in the Quran, as well as everyday behavior such as table manners, dress, and posture. Hadith are also regarded by Muslims as important tools for understanding things mentioned in the Quran but not explained, a source for tafsir (commentaries written on the Quran). Therefore, Muslims usually maintain that hadith are a necessary requirement for the true and proper practice of Islam, as it gives Muslims the nuanced details of Islamic practice and belief in areas where the Quran is silent. Details of the prescribed movements and words of the prayer (known as rak'a) and how many times they are to be performed, are found in hadith. However, hadith differ on these details and consequently salat is performed differently by different hadithist Islamic sects. (Note: Muslims have come to blows over differences in the proper ritual movement in salat prayer. In the 18th century, a man was "almost beaten to death" in the great mosque of Delhi for raising his hands during salat in the manner that revivalist preacher/scholar Shah Waliullah Dehlawi had advocated. The victim's assailants supported the doctrine of traditionalists of Hanafi fiqh, which held that one's hands should be raised only once during the ritual prayer, while Waliullah held that madhhab schools of fiqh had ignored authentic hadith, which made clear hands should be raised over ears multiple times during the praying of salat.)

Quranists, on the other hand, believe that if the Quran is silent on some matter, it is because God did not hold its detail to be of consequence; and that some hadith contradict the Quran, proving that some hadith are a source of corruption and not a complement to the Quran.

Hadith were also deployed to legitimize Sufism’s more formal structures of brotherhoods (tariqas), hierarchies of initiation, and rituals that were articulated from the 9th century onward. Some readings had a ceremonial value sanctifying occasions such as the ascent of a dynast or the birth of a child. (a religious scholar, religious or political leader)

== History, tradition and usage ==
=== History ===
According to the British historian of Arab world, Alfred Guillaume, it is "certain" that "several small collections" of hadith were "assembled in Umayyad times." There are conflicting reports as to whether recording hadith from the pre-Umayyad period was recommended or prohibited, and there is no extant collection of hadiths from this period. (see:Ban on Hadith)

In Islamic law, the use of hadith as it is understood today (hadith of Muhammad with documentation, isnads, etc.) came gradually. According to scholars such as Joseph Schacht, Ignaz Goldziher, and Daniel W. Brown, early schools of Islamic jurisprudence used the rulings of the Prophet's Companions, the rulings of the Caliphs, and practices that "had gained general acceptance among the jurists of that school". On his deathbed, Caliph Umar instructed Muslims to seek guidance from the Quran, the early Muslims (muhajirun) who emigrated to Medina with Muhammad, the Medina residents who welcomed and supported the muhajirun (the ansar) and the people of the desert.

It was Abū ʿAbdullāh Muhammad ibn Idrīs al-Shāfiʿī (150-204 AH), known as al-Shafi'i, who emphasized the final authority of a hadith of Muhammad, so that even the Quran was "to be interpreted in the light of traditions (i.e. hadith), and not vice versa." While traditionally the Qur'an has traditionally been considered superior in authority to the sunna, Al-Shafi'i "forcefully argued" that the sunna was "on equal footing with the Quran", (according to scholar Daniel Brown) for (as Al-Shafi'i put it) "the command of the Prophet is the command of God." According to the scholars Harald Motzki and Daniel W. Brown the earliest Islamic legal reasonings that have come down to us were "virtually hadith-free", but gradually, over the course of second century A.H. "the infiltration and incorporation of Prophetic hadith into Islamic jurisprudence" took place.

In 851 the rationalist Mu`tazila school of thought fell out of favor in the Abbasid Caliphate. The Mu`tazila, for whom the "judge of truth ... was human reason," had clashed with traditionists who looked to the literal meaning of the Quran and hadith for truth. While the Quran had been officially compiled and approved, hadith had not. One result was the number of hadith began "multiplying in suspiciously direct correlation to their utility" to the quoter of the hadith (Traditionists quoted hadith warning against listening to human opinion instead of Sharia; Hanafites quoted a hadith stating that "In my community there will rise a man called Abu Hanifa [the Hanafite founder] who will be its guiding light". In fact one agreed upon hadith warned that, "There will be forgers, liars who will bring you hadith which neither you nor your forefathers have heard, Beware of them." In addition the number of hadith grew enormously. While Malik ibn Anas had attributed just 1720 statements or deeds to the Muhammad, it was no longer unusual to find people who had collected a hundred times that number of hadith.

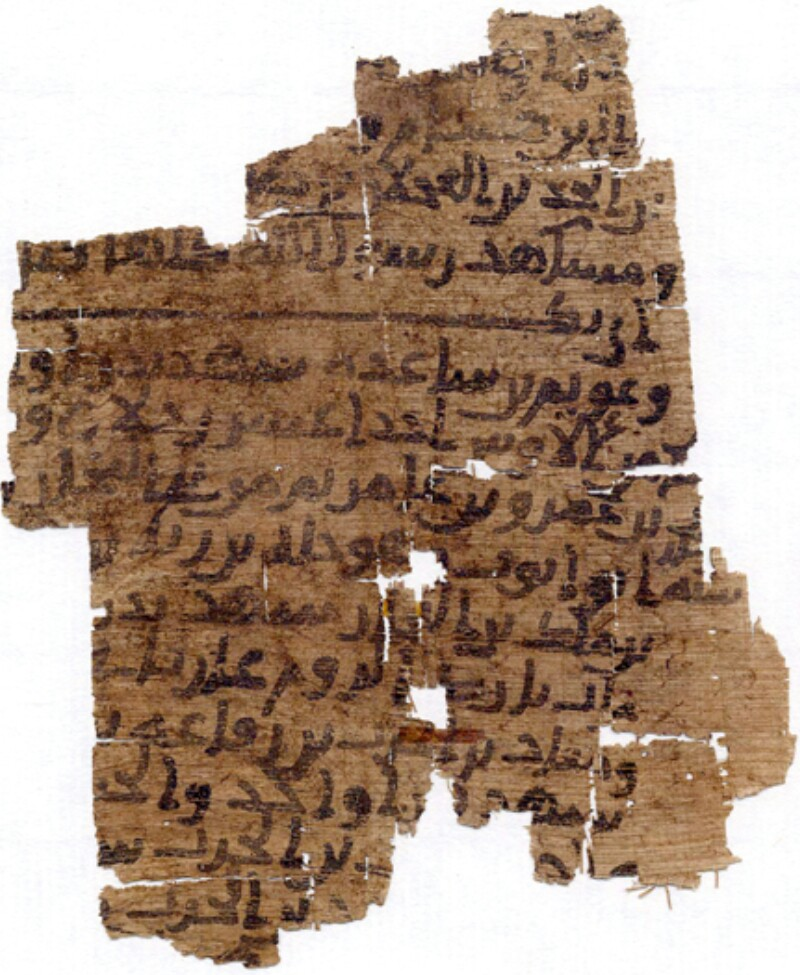
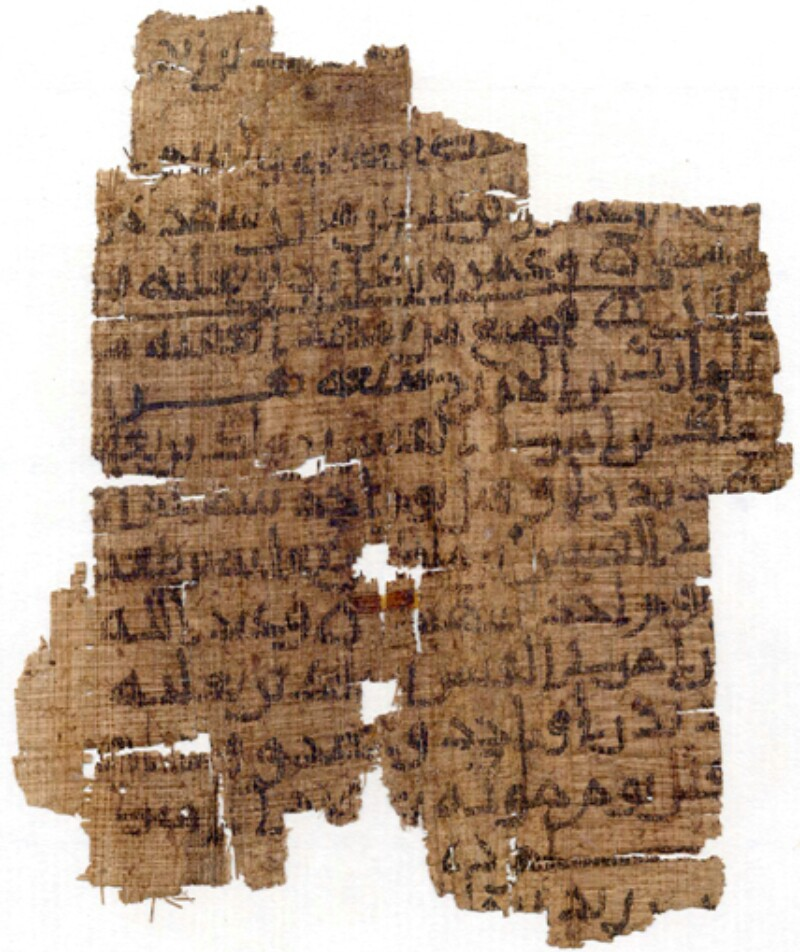
PERF No. 665: The earliest extant manuscript of The Sirah Of Prophet Muḥammad by Ibn Hisham. This manuscript is believed to be transmitted by students of Ibn Hishām (d. 218 AH /834 CE), perhaps soon after his death.

Faced with a huge corpus of miscellaneous traditions supporting different views on a wide variety of controversial matters—some of them flatly contradicting each other—Islamic scholars of the Abbasid period sought to authenticate hadith. Scholars had to decide which hadith were to be trusted as authentic and which had been fabricated for political or theological purposes. To do this, they used a number of techniques that Muslims now call the science of hadith.

The earliest surviving hadith manuscripts were copied on papyrus. A long scroll collects traditions transmitted by the scholar and qadi 'Abd Allāh ibn Lahīʻa (d. 790). A Ḥadīth Dāwūd (History of David), attributed to Wahb ibn Munabbih, survives in a manuscript dated 844. A collection of hadith dedicated to invocations to God, attributed to a certain Khālid ibn Yazīd, is dated 880–881. A consistent fragment of the Jāmiʿ of the Egyptian Maliki jurist 'Abd Allāh ibn Wahb (d. 813) is finally dated to 889.

=== Shia and Sunni textual traditions ===
Sunni and Shia hadith collections differ because scholars from the two traditions differ as to the reliability of the narrators and transmitters. Narrators who sided with Abu Bakr and Umar rather than Ali, in the disputes over leadership that followed the death of Muhammad, are considered unreliable by the Shia; narrations attributed to Ali and the family of Muhammad, and to their supporters, are preferred. Sunni scholars put trust in narrators such as Aisha, whom Shia reject. Differences in hadith collections have contributed to differences in worship practices and shari'a law and have hardened the dividing line between the two traditions.

==== Extent and nature in the Sunni tradition ====
In the Sunni tradition, the number of such texts is somewhere between seven and thirteen thousand, (Note: See the references and discussion by Abdul Fattah Abu Ghuddah Thalathatu rasa'il fi ulum al-hadith; risalat abi dawud ila ahl makkata fi wasf sunanihi, p. 36, footnote. Beirut: Maktaba al-Matbu'at al-Islamiyah: 2nd ed 1426/2005.) but the number of hadith is far greater because several isnad sharing the same text are each counted as individual hadith. If, say, ten companions record a text reporting a single incident in the life of Muhammad, hadith scholars can count this as ten hadith. Thus, Musnad Ahmad, for example, has over 30,000 hadith—but this count includes texts that are repeated in order to record slight variations within the text or within the chains of narrations. Identifying the narrators of the various texts, comparing their narrations of the same texts to identify both the soundest reporting of a text and the reporters who are most sound in their reporting occupied experts of hadith throughout the 2nd century. In the 3rd century of Islam (from 225/840 to about 275/889), (Note: The earliest book, Bukhari's Sahih was composed by 225/840 since he states that he spent sixteen years composing it (Hady al-Sari, introduction to Fath al-Bari, p. 489, Lahore: Dar Nashr al-Kutub al-Islamiya, 1981/1401) and also that he showed it to Yahya ibn Ma'in who died in 233. Nasa'i, the last to die of the authors of the six books, died in 303/915. He probably completed this work a few decades before his death: by 275 or so.) hadith experts composed brief works recording a selection of about two- to five-thousand such texts that they felt to have been most soundly documented or most widely referred to in the Muslim scholarly community. (Note: Counting multiple narrations of the same texts as a single text, the number of hadiths each author has recorded roughly as follows: Bukhari (as in Zabidi's Mukhtasar of Bukhari's book) 2134, Muslim (as in Mundhiri's Mukhtasar of Muslim's book) 2200, Tirmidhi 4000, Abu Dawud 4000, Nasa'i 4800, Ibn Majah 4300. There is considerable overlap amongst the six books so that Ibn al-Athir's Jami' al-Usul, which gathers together the hadiths texts of all six books deleting repeated texts, has about 9500 hadiths.) The 4th and 5th century saw these six works being commented on quite widely. This auxiliary literature has contributed to making their study the place of departure for any serious study of hadith. In addition, Bukhari and Muslim in particular, claimed that they were collecting only the soundest of sound hadith. These later scholars tested their claims and agreed to them, so that today, they are considered the most reliable collections of hadith. Toward the end of the 5th century, Ibn al-Qaisarani formally standardized the Sunni canon into six pivotal works, a delineation that remains to this day.

Over the centuries, several different categories of collections have emerged. Some are more general, such as the muṣannaf, the muʿjam, and the jāmiʿ, and some more specific, characterized either by the subjects covered, such as the sunan (restricted to legal-liturgical traditions), or bytheirs composition, such as the arbaʿīniyyāt (collections of forty hadith).

==== Extent and nature in the Shia tradition ====
Shi'a Muslims seldom if ever use the six major hadith collections followed by the Sunnis because they do not trust many of the Sunni narrators and transmitters. They have their own extensive hadith literature. The best-known hadith collections are The Four Books, which were compiled by three authors who are known as the 'Three Muhammads'. The Four Books are: Kitab al-Kafi by Muhammad ibn Ya'qub al-Kulayni al-Razi (329 AH), Man la yahduruhu al-Faqih by Muhammad ibn Babuya and Al-Tahdhib and Al-Istibsar both by Shaykh Muhammad Tusi. Shi'a clerics also make use of extensive collections and commentaries by later authors.

Unlike Sunnis, the majority of Shia do not consider any of their hadith collections to be sahih (authentic) in their entirety. Therefore, each individual hadith in a specific collection must be investigated separately to determine its authenticity. The Akhbari school, however, considers all the hadith from the four books to be authentic.

The importance of hadith in the Shia school of thought is well documented. This can be captured by Ali ibn Abi Talib, cousin of Muhammad, when he narrated that "Whoever of our Shia (followers) knows our Shariah and takes out the weak of our followers from the darkness of ignorance to the light of knowledge (Hadith) which we (Ahl al-Bayt) have gifted to them, he on the day of judgement will come with a crown on his head. It will shine among the people gathered on the plain of resurrection." Hassan al-Askari, a descendant of Muhammad, gave support to this narration, stating "Whoever he had taken out in the worldly life from the darkness of ignorance can hold to his light to be taken out of the darkness of the plain of resurrection to the garden (paradise). Then all those whomever he had taught in the worldly life anything of goodness, or had opened from his heart a lock of ignorance or had removed his doubts will come out."

Regarding the importance of maintaining accuracy in recording hadith, it has been documented that Muhammad al-Baqir, the great-grandson of Muhammad, has said that "Holding back in a doubtful issue is better than entering destruction. Your not narrating a Hadith is better than you narrating a Hadith in which you have not studied thoroughly. On every truth, there is a reality. Above every right thing, there is a light. Whatever agrees with the book of Allah you must take it and whatever disagrees you must leave it alone." Al-Baqir also emphasized the selfless devotion of Ahl al-Bayt to preserving the traditions of Muhammad through his conversation with Jabir ibn Abd Allah, an old companion of Muhammad. He (Al-Baqir) said, "Oh Jabir, had we spoken to you from our opinions and desires, we would be counted among those who are destroyed. We speak to you of the hadith which we treasure from the Messenger of Allah, Oh Allah grant compensation to Muhammad and his family worthy of their services to your cause, just as they treasure their gold and silver." Further, it has been narrated that Ja'far al-Sadiq, the son of al-Baqir, has said the following regarding hadith: "You must write it down; you will not memorize until you write it down."

=== Modern usage ===
Hadith as an Interpretation of the Quran:

Move not your tongue with it, to hasten with recitation of it. Indeed, upon Us is its collection and its recitation. So when We have recited it, then follow its recitation. Then upon Us is Interpretation. Surah Al Qiyamah, verse 16–19.

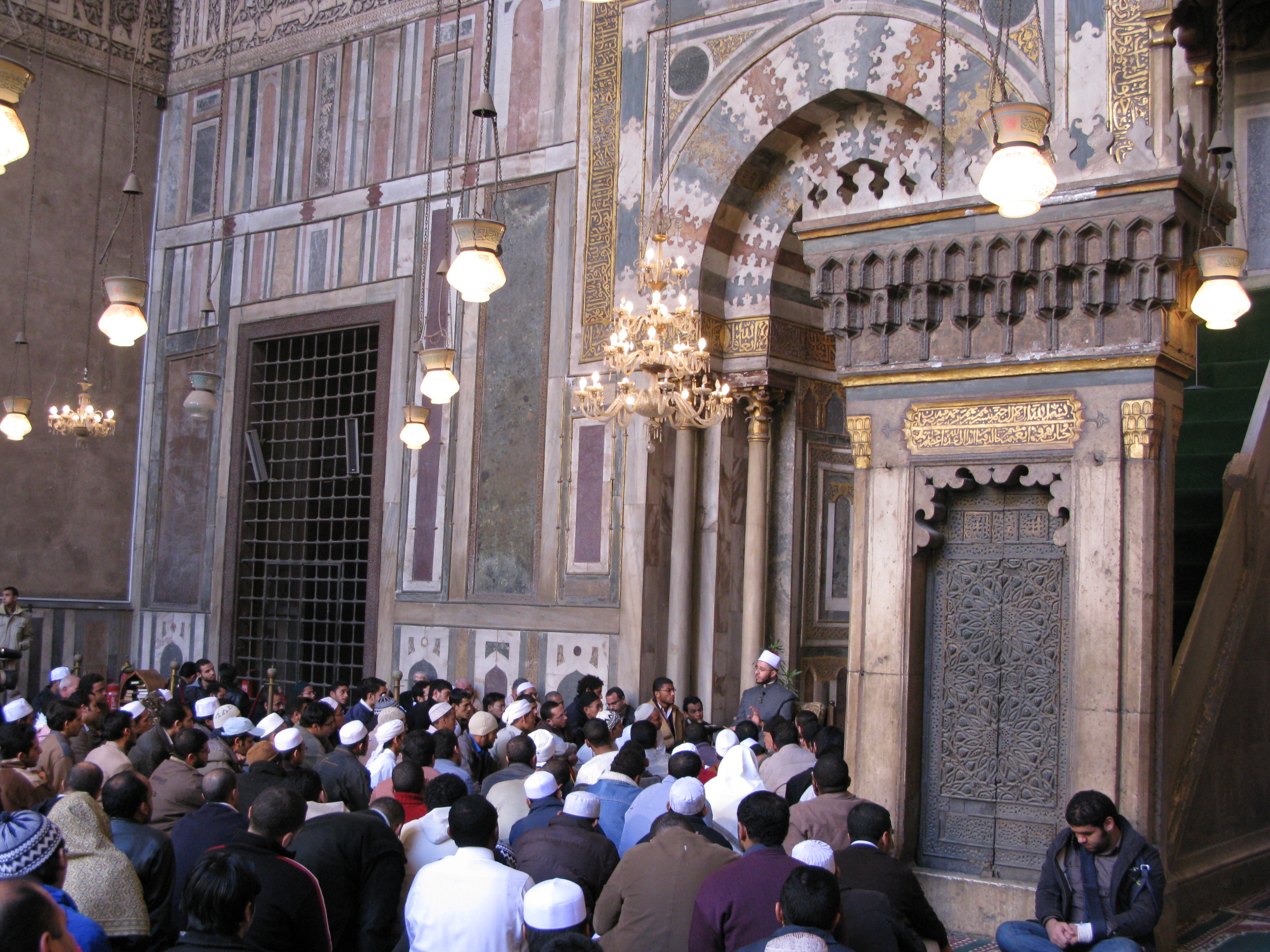
Imam Nawawi's Forty Hadith taught in the Mosque-Madrassa of Sultan Hassan in Cairo, Egypt

Modern approaches include criticism of the text and content in addition to classical approaches that don't go beyond the criticism of the chain of narrators called "sanad" in order to verify a hadith; Weakness in the pronunciation of the text, the strange meaning, contrary to the dalil syar'i (evidences of sharia), and the mind, related to the priority of the mind, contains abominations, isra'iliyyat and bid'ah, not found in the main hadith book and exaggerates the reward or punishment for light deeds etc.

The mainstream sects consider hadith to be essential supplements to, and clarifications of, the Quran, Islam's holy book, as well as for clarifying issues pertaining to Islamic jurisprudence. Ibn al-Salah, a hadith specialist, described the relationship between hadith and other aspects of the religion by saying: "It is the science most pervasive in respect to the other sciences in their various branches, in particular to jurisprudence being the most important of them." "The intended meaning of 'other sciences' here are those pertaining to religion," explains Ibn Hajar al-Asqalani, "Quranic exegesis, hadith, and jurisprudence. The science of hadith became the most pervasive due to the need displayed by each of these three sciences. The need hadith has of its science is apparent. As for Quranic exegesis, then the preferred manner of explaining the speech of God is by means of what has been accepted as a statement of Muhammad. The one looking to this is in need of distinguishing the acceptable from the unacceptable. Regarding jurisprudence, then the jurist is in need of citing as an evidence the acceptable to the exception of the later, something only possible utilizing the science of hadith."

=== Western scholarship ===
Western scholarly criticism of hadith began in colonial India in the mid 19th century with the works of Aloys Sprenger and William Muir. These works were generally critical of the reliability of hadith, suggesting that traditional Muslim scholarship was incapable of determining the authenticity of hadith, and that the hadith tradition had been corrupted by widespread fabrication of fraudulent hadith. The late 19th century work of Ignaz Goldziher, Muhammedanische Studien (Muslim Studies), is considered seminal in the field of Western hadith studies. Goldziher took the same critical approach as Sprenger and Muir, suggesting that many hadith showed anachronistic elements indicating that they were not authentic, and that the many contradictory hadith made the value of the entire corpus questionable.

The work of Joseph Schacht in the 1950s sought to obtain a critical understanding of the chains of transmission of particular hadith, focusing on the convergence of transmission chains of particular hadith back to a single "common link" from who all later sources ultimately obtained the hadith, who Schacht considered to be the likely true author of the hadith, which could allow dating of when particular hadith began circulating. This method is widely influential in Western hadith scholarship, though has received criticism from some scholars. Schacht's arguments regarding the validity of hadith have been vigorously disputed by Muslim scholars like Muhammad Mustafa Azmi, who contended that hadith were written down already during Muhammads lifetime, and that large scale creation of fraudulent hadith was implausible.

Some modern scholars have contested Schacht's assertion that the "common links" were likely forgers of the hadith, instead suggesting that they were avid collectors of hadith, though their arguments for this have been criticised by other scholars.

== Criticism ==
The major points of intra-Muslim criticism of the hadith literature is based in questions regarding its authenticity. However, Muslim criticism of hadith is also based on theological and philosophical Islamic grounds of argument and critique.

Historically, some sects of the Kharijites rejected the Hadith. There were some who opposed even the writing down of the Hadith itself for fear that it would compete with or even replace the Quran. Mu'tazilites also rejected the hadith as the basis for Islamic law, while at the same time accepting the Sunnah and ijma. For Mu'tazilites, the basic argument for rejecting the hadith was that "since its essence is transmission by individuals, [it] cannot be a sure avenue of our knowledge about the Prophetic teaching unlike the Qur'an about whose transmission there is a universal unanimity among Muslims".

With regard to clarity, Imam Ali al-Ridha has narrated that "In our Hadith there are Mutashabih (unclear ones) like those in al-Quran as well as Muhkam (clear ones) like those of al-Quran. You must refer the unclear ones to the clear ones."

Muslim scholars have a long history of questioning the hadith literature throughout Islamic history. Western academics also became active in the field later (in Hadith studies), starting in 1890, but much more often since 1950.

Some Muslim critics of hadith even go so far as to completely reject them as the basic texts of Islam and instead adhere to the movement called Quranism. Quranists argue that the Quran itself does not contain an invitation to accept hadith as a second theological source alongside the Quran. Both modernist Muslims and Quranists believe that the problems in the Islamic world come partly from the traditional elements of the hadith and seek to reject those teachings.

Among the most prominent Muslim critics of hadith in modern times are the Egyptian Rashad Khalifa, who became known as the "discoverer" of the Quran code (Code 19), the Malaysian Kassim Ahmad and the American-Turkish Edip Yüksel (Quranism).

Western scholars, notably Ignaz Goldziher and Joseph Schacht among others, have criticised traditional hadith sciences as being almost entirely focused on scrutinizing the chain of transmitters (isnad) rather than the actual contents of the hadith (matn), and that scrutiny of isnad cannot determine the authenticity of a hadith. Many Western scholars suspect that there was widespread fabrication of hadith (either entirely or by the misattribution of the views of early Muslim religious and legal thinkers to Muhammad) in the early centuries of Islam to support certain theological and legal positions. In addition to fabrication, it is possible for the meaning of a hadith to have greatly drifted from its original telling through the different interpretations and biases of its varying transmitters, even if the chain of transmission is authentic. While some hadith may genuinely originate from firsthand observation of Muhammad (particularly personal traits that were not of theological interest, like his fondness for tharid and sweets), Western scholars suggest that it is extraordinarily difficult if not impossible to determine which hadith accurately reflect the historical Muhammad. Orthodox Muslims, including compilers of the accounts (in particular hadith), agree the original sources contained many falsified historical accounts, but maintain that the science of hadith has determined their accuracy. Revisionists dispute this. One concern is that rather than decreasing in number over time as they were lost or forgotten, the number of hadith increased, a red flag that fabrications must have been added. Patricia Crone argues that it is impossible to find a "core" of authentic hadith because we do not know when the fabrication of them started.

Bukhari [810–870 CE] is said to have examined a total of 600,000 traditions attributed to the Prophet; he preserved some 7000 (including repetitions), or in other words dismissed some 593,000 as inauthentic. If Ibn Hanbal [ (780–855 CE)] examined a similar number of traditions, he must have rejected about 5700, his collection containing some 30,000 (again including repetitions). Of Ibn Hanbal's traditions, 1,710 (including repetitions) are transmitted by the companion Abd Allah ibn Abbas [(619–687 CE)]. Yet less than fifty years earlier one scholar had estimated that Ibn Abbas had only heard nine traditions from the Prophet, while another thought that the correct figure might be ten. If Ibn Abbas had heard ten traditions from the Prophet in the years around 800, but over a thousand by about 850 CE, how many had he heard in 700 or 632? Even if we accept that ten of Ibn Abbas' traditions are authentic, how do we identify them in the pool of 1,710?

Hadith scholar Muhammad Mustafa Azmi has disputed the claims made by Western scholars about the reliability of traditional hadith criticism.

== See also ==
- Glossary of Islam
- Outline of Islam
- Index of Islam-related articles
- Categories of Hadith
- Criticism of hadith
- Hadith studies
- Hadith terminology
- Islamic honorifics
- Kutub al-Sittah
- List of fatwas
- List of hadith authors and commentators
- List of hadith collections
- Oral Torah
  - Talmud
- Prophetic biography
- Sacred tradition
- Sharia
- Tafsir

== Bibliography ==
- Berg, H. (2000). The development of exegesis in early Islam: the authenticity of Muslim literature from the formative period. Routledge. ISBN 0-7007-1224-0.
- Brown, Daniel W. (1996). Rethinking tradition in modern Islamic thought. Cambridge University Press. ISBN 0521570778.
- Brown, Daniel (1999). Rethinking Tradition in Modern Islamic Thought. Cambridge University Press. ISBN 978-0-521-65394-7.
- Brown, Jonathan A. C. (2004). "Criticism of the Proto-Hadith Canon: Al-daraqutni's Adjustment of the Sahihayn". Journal of Islamic Studies. 15 (1): 1–37. doi:10.1093/jis/15.1.1.
- Brown, Jonathan A.C. (2007). The Canonization of al-Bukhārī and Muslim (PDF). Leiden, Netherlands: Brill. ISBN 9789004158399.
- Brown, Jonathan A.C. (2009). Hadith: Muhammad's Legacy in the Medieval and Modern World (Foundations of Islam). Oneworld Publications. ISBN 978-1851686636.
- Brown, Jonathan A.C. (2014). Misquoting Muhammad: The Challenge and Choices of Interpreting the Prophet's Legacy. Oneworld Publications. ISBN 978-1780744209.
- Hallaq, Wael B. (1999). "The Authenticity of Prophetic Ḥadîth: A Pseudo-Problem". Studia Islamica (89): 75–90. doi:10.2307/1596086. ISSN 0585-5292. JSTOR 1596086. S2CID 170916710.
- Ibn Warraq, ed. (2000). "1. Studies on Muhammad and the Rise of Islam". The Quest for the Historical Muhammad. Prometheus. pp. 15–88.
- Little, Joshua (2024). "'Where did you learn to write Arabic?': A Critical Analysis of Some Ḥadīths on the Origins and Spread of the Arabic Script". Journal of Islamic Studies. 35 (2): 145–178. doi:10.1093/jis/etae008. hdl:11370/c06a9514-d66c-4ed8-af2a-02d33203eddd.
- Lucas, S. (2004). Constructive Critics, Hadith Literature, and the Articulation of Sunni Islam. Brill Academic Publishers. ISBN 90-04-13319-4.
- Muhyi ad-Din Abu Zakariyya Yahya bin Sharaf an-Nawawi (1975). Riyadh as-Salihin [Gardens of the Righteous]. Translated by Mauhammad Zafulla Khan. New York: Olive Branch Press.
- Robinson, C. F. (2003). Islamic Historiography. Cambridge University Press. ISBN 0-521-62936-5.
- Robson, J. "Hadith". In P.J. Bearman; Th. Bianquis; C.E. Bosworth; E. van Donzel; W.P. Heinrichs (eds.). Encyclopaedia of Islam Online. Brill Academic Publishers. ISSN 1573-3912.
- Schacht, Joseph (1950). The Origins of Muhammadan Jurisprudence. Oxford: Clarendon
- Senturk, Recep (2005). Narrative Social Structure: Anatomy of the Hadith Transmission Network, 610-1505. Stanford, CA: Stanford University Press. ISBN 9780804752077.
- Swarup, Ram (1983). Understanding Islam through Hadis. New Delhi: Voice of India. ISBN 9788185990736. Archived from the original on 10 October 2017.
