= Al-Rabi' bin Habib al-Farahidi =

- الربيع بن حبيب الفراهيدي
- Title: Imam

Personal life
- Born: Early 8th century CE (late 1st / early 2nd century AH) Batinah, Oman
- Died: c. 786 CE (170 AH) Oman
- Notable work: Jami Sahih

Religious life
- Religion: Islam
- Denomination: Ibadi

Al-Rabi' bin Habib al-Farahidi (Arabic: الربيع بن حبيب الفراهيدي), frequently referred to simply as Imam al-Rabi', was an 8th-century (2nd century AH) Islamic scholar, traditionist (muhaddith), and an early leader of the Ibadi branch of Islam. He is best known as the original compiler of Jami Sahih (also widely known as Musnad al-Rabi' ibn Habib or Tartib al-Musnad), which serves as the principal collection of hadith for Ibadi Muslims globally.

== Early life and education ==
Al-Rabi' bin Habib was born in the Batinah region of Oman during the late first century or early second century of the Islamic calendar (early 8th century CE). He belonged to the Al-Farahidi tribe, an Arab lineage.

Seeking advanced religious education, Al-Rabi' migrated to Basra, Iraq, which was a major intellectual center and the early epicenter of the Ibadi movement. In Basra, he became a central disciple of Abu 'Ubaydah Muslim bin Abi Karimah, the leading Ibadi scholar and organizer of the sect following the death of its founder, Jabir ibn Zayd. Under Abu 'Ubaydah's tutelage, Al-Rabi' studied Islamic jurisprudence (fiqh), theology, and the transmission of hadith. He became a member of the "Campaigners of Knowledge" (Hamalat al-'Ilm), a select group of scholars trained by Abu 'Ubaydah and dispatched to regions like Oman, Yemen, and North Africa to propagate the Ibadi doctrine.

== Leadership and role in Ibadism ==
Following the death of Abu 'Ubaydah, Al-Rabi' bin Habib succeeded him as the spiritual and intellectual leader of the Ibadi community in Basra. He played a significant role in systematizing the theological and legal frameworks of Ibadism.

His leadership coincided with a period of political turbulence during the early Abbasid caliphate. This prompted Al-Rabi' to maintain a largely quietist and scholarly approach in Iraq, while simultaneously supporting the establishment of independent Ibadi Imamates elsewhere, such as the Rustamid dynasty in North Africa and the early Imamates in his native Oman. Eventually, facing mounting political pressure in Basra, Al-Rabi' returned to Oman, where he spent his final years teaching and advising the local Ibadi leadership until his death around 170 AH (786 CE).

== Jami Sahih ==
Al-Rabi's best-known scholarly contribution is his hadith compilation, Jami Sahih. This text forms the bedrock of Ibadi hadith literature, theology, and jurisprudence.

- Content and structure: The original collection consisted of just over a thousand individual hadiths. It is defined by its highly concise chains of transmission (isnads). A standard chain in this work often features only three links directly to the Prophet Muhammad: Al-Rabi' narrating from his teacher Abu 'Ubaydah, who narrates from Jabir ibn Zayd, who narrates directly from Companions like Ibn Abbas, Anas bin Malik, or Aisha.
- The Tartib al-Musnad: In the 12th century CE (6th century AH), the North African Ibadi scholar Abu Ya'qub Yusuf bin Ibrahim al-Warjilani (d. 570 AH / 1175 CE) reorganized Al-Rabi's compilation. He arranged the collection into a formal musnad format categorized by topic and narrator, and appended additional subsequent narrations. This rearranged and expanded version, known as Tartib al-Musnad, is the standard format widely used and printed today.
- Status in Ibadism: For Ibadi Muslims, Jami Sahih holds a canonical status equivalent to that of Sahih al-Bukhari and Sahih Muslim in Sunni Islam. Ibadis consider it the most authentic collection of Prophetic traditions due to the strict piety, moral rectitude, and precision they attribute to its specific chain of early transmitters.

== Legacy and reception ==
The historical reception of Al-Rabi' bin Habib and his scholarly output depends heavily on sectarian lines:

- Ibadi perspective: He is venerated as the "Imam of the Sunnah" and a major preserver of the Prophet's authentic teachings. His interpretations of hadith influence core Ibadi theology, including their views on the impossibility of physically seeing God in the afterlife, the created nature of the Quran, and their specific doctrines regarding intercession and major sins.
- Sunni perspective: Al-Rabi' bin Habib is largely absent from the major Sunni biographical dictionaries (kutub al-rijal). Because Sunni hadith scholars historically classified the Ibadi movement under the broader umbrella of the Kharijites (a historical label Ibadis reject), Sunni traditionists generally do not utilize his compilation. Classical Sunni scholars often view Al-Rabi' and his teacher Abu 'Ubaydah as majhul (unknown or unreliable transmitters within the Sunni science of hadith), leading them to largely disregard his work in mainstream Sunni jurisprudence.
