= Sunnah =

Literature on Muhammad's deeds and sayings

Sunnah is the body of traditions and practices of the Islamic prophet Muhammad that constitute a model for Muslims to follow. For Muslims, the sunnah is what all the Muslims of Muhammad's time supposedly saw, followed, and passed on to the next generations. However, what constitutes the Sunnah, and its interpretation, depends significantly on the specific Islamic sect and school of thought. Sunnis rely on six major canonical hadith collections to document the Sunnah, known as Kutub al-Sittah. For Shias, the sunnah is generally documented in Kutub al-'Arba'a, which give preference to hadiths attributed to the Prophet's family (Ahl al-Bayt) and the Twelve Imams. For Ibadis, the sunnah is documented in the two hadith collections Jami Sahih and Tartib al-Musnad. Sufis hold that Muhammad transmitted his sunnah, including his spiritual values, "through a series of Sufi teachers".

According to classical Islamic theories, the sunnah is primarily documented by hadith—which are the verbally-transmitted record of the teachings, actions, deeds, sayings, and silent approvals or disapprovals attributed to Muhammad—and alongside the Qur'an (the book of Islam) are the divine revelation (wahy) delivered through Muhammad that make up the primary sources of Islamic law, beliefs, and theology. The sunnah is classified into different types based on Muhammad's actions: his specific words (Sunnah Qawliyyah), his actions such as habits and practices (Sunnah Fiiliyyah), and silent approvals (Sunnah Taqririyyah). However, some Muslims, such as the Kharijites and Mu'tazilites, have distinguished between the Sunnah and Hadith, accepting the Sunnah as an authoritative practice while being critical of the Hadith's reliability as a source for Islamic law. The Quranist stance on the Sunnah varies from outright rejection to an approach that considers external sources as secondary and dependent on the Qur'an for verification.

Historically, in pre-Islamic Arabia, the term sunnah referred to 'manner of acting', (Urf) whether good or bad and recording of it was also an Arab tradition. Later, "good traditions" began to be referred to as sunnah and the concept of "Muhammad's sunnah" was established. During the early Islamic period, it included precedents set by both Muhammad, and his companions. In addition, the sunnah of Muhammad was not necessarily associated with hadith. The strict focus of Muhammad’s example—especially as recorded in hadith—as the only authoritative source of sunnah was established later, particularly by the scholar al-Shafi'i (d. 820 CE), in the late second century of Islam. The term as-sunnah (السنة, lit. 'the Sunnah') then eventually came to be viewed as synonymous with the sunnah of Muhammad, based on hadith reports, distinct from other practices.

== Definitions and usage ==
Sunnah (سنة [ˈsʊn.næ], pl.: سنن sunan [ˈsʊ.næn]) is an Arabic word that means:

- "habit" or "usual practice" (USC glossary);
- "habitual practice, customary procedure or action, norm, usage sanctioned by tradition" (Wehr Dictionary);
- "a body of established customs and beliefs that make up a tradition" (Oxford Islamic Studies Online);
- "a path, a way, a manner of life" (M. A. Qazi);
- "precedent" or "way of life" (pre-Islamic definition, Joseph Schacht and Ignác Goldziher).

Its religious definition can be:

- "the Sunna of the Prophet, i.e., his sayings and doings, later established as legally binding precedents" (along with the Law established by the Quran) (Hans Wehr);
- "All of the traditions and practices of the Prophet" of Islam, "that have become models to be followed" by Muslims (M. A. Qazi);
- "the body of traditional social and legal custom and practice of the Islamic community" (Encyclopædia Britannica);
- "the actions and sayings of the Prophet Muhammad" (Oxford Islamic Studies Online).
- "Al-Hikma (wisdom)", as per definition of Shafi'i school in his book, ar-Risala, based on his interpretation of Qur'an chapter Al Imran 3:164.

Islam Web gives two slightly different definitions:

- "the statements, actions and approvals (or disapprovals) of Prophet Muhammad", (definition used by "legal theorists");
- "anything narrated from or about the Prophet... either before or after he became a prophet, of his statements, actions, confirmations, biography, and his physical character and attributes" (used by scholars of hadith).

It was first used with the meaning of "law" in the Syro-Roman law book before it became widely used in Islamic jurisprudence.

=== Sunnah and hadith ===
In the context of biographical records of Muhammad, sunnah often stands synonymous with hadith since most of the personality traits of Muhammad are known from descriptions of him, his sayings and his actions from hadith. According to Seyyed Nasr, the hadith contains the words of Muhammad, while the sunnah contains his words and actions along with pre-Islamic practices of which he approved. In the context of sharia, Malik ibn Anas and the Hanafi scholars are assumed to have differentiated between the two: for example Malik is said to have rejected some traditions that reached him because, according to him, they were against the "established practice of the people of Medina".

=== Sunnah Salat ===
In addition to being "the way" of Islam or the traditional social and legal custom and practice of the Islamic community, sunnah is often used as a synonym for mustahabb (encouraged) rather than wajib/fard (obligatory), regarding some commendable action (usually the saying of a prayer). An example of the sunnah would be to offer two extra rakat of prayer after the Maghrib prayer.

=== Ahl as-Sunnah ===
Sunni Muslims are also referred to as Ahl as-Sunnah wa'l-Jamā'ah ("people of the tradition and the community (of Muhammad)") or Ahl as-Sunnah for short. Some early Sunnî Muslim scholars (such as Abu Hanifa, al-Humaydî, Ibn Abî 'Âsim, Abû Dâwûd, and Abû Nasr al-Marwazî) reportedly used the term "the sunnah" narrowly to refer to Sunni Doctrine as opposed to the creeds of Shia and other non-Sunni Islamic sects. Sunnah literally means "face", "nature", "lifestyle", etc. In the time of Muhammad's companion, newly converted Muslims accepted and rejected some set of creed by using reason. So many early Muslim scholars started writing books on creed entitled as "sunnah".

=== In the Quran ===
The word "sunna" appears several times in the Qur'an, but there is no specific mention of sunnah of the messenger or prophet (sunnat al-rasool, sunnat al-nabi or sunna al-nabawiyyah), i.e. the way/practice of Muhammad (there are several verses calling on Muslims to obey Muhammad—see below). Four verses (8.38, 15.13, 18.55) use the expression "sunnat al-awwalin", which is thought to mean "the way or practice of the ancients". It is described as something "that has passed away" or prevented unbelievers from accepting God. "Sunnat Allah" (the "way of God") appears eight times in five verses. In addition, verse 17.77 talks of both the way of other, earlier Muslim messengers (Ibrahim, Musa, etc.), and of "our way", i.e. God's way:

[This is] the way (sunna) of those whom we sent [as messengers] before you, and you will not find any change in Our way (sunnatuna).

This indicates to some scholars (such as Javed Ahmad Ghamidi) that sunnah predates both the Quran and Muhammad, and is actually the tradition of the prophets of God, specifically the tradition of Abraham. Christians, Jews and the Arab descendants of Ishmael, the Arabized Arabs or Ishmaelites, when Muhammad reinstituted this practice as an integral part of Islam.

== History and etymology ==
Prior to the "golden age of classical Islamic jurisprudence", (Note: According to Mahmoud El-Gamal.) the "ancient schools" of law prevailed.

The traditions not directly sourced from hadith or practice of Muhammad and instead traced solely to some Sahabah were also acknowledged as a source of jurisprudence. These were regarded by scholars of Islam – such as Nawawi – as "unrecorded hadith" which, while not explicitly attributed to Muhammad himself – were clearly practiced by the first generation of Muhammad's followers. Al-Nawawi has listed Zubayr ibn al-Awwam's ruling regarding ethics of sitting down during eating and drinking in his book, Riyadh as Shaliheen, by basing the ethic in az-Zubayr practice, which was narrated by his son, Abdulah. Another manners and ethic ruling based on az-Zubayr is the prohibition of sleeping after Sübuh, as well as the one concerning the ethics of sitting down while drinking.

Other examples of this kind of sunnah also include:

- the difference in the number of lashes used to punish alcohol consumption, Caliph Ali reported that (Muhammad and Abu Bakr ordered 40 lashes, Umar 80) — "All this is sunna";
- Umar's deathbed instructions on where Muslims should seek guidance: from the Qur'an, the early Muslims (muhajirun) who emigrated to Medina with Muhammad, the Medina residents who welcomed and supported the muhajirun (the ansar), the people of the desert, and the protected communities of Jews and Christians (ahl al-dhimma); hadith of Muhammad are not mentioned.

According to historians (particularly Daniel W. Brown), the classical Islamic definition of sunnah as the customs and practices of Muhammad (only) was not the original one.

In al-Ṭabarī's history of early Islam, the term "Sunnah of the Prophet" is not only used "surprisingly infrequently", but used to refer to "political oaths or slogans used by rebels", or "a general standard of justice and right conduct", and not "to specific precedents set by Muhammad", let alone hadith. An early theological writing by Hasan al-Basri (Risala fi'l Qadar) also is "empty of references to specific cases" when mentioning "Sunnah of the Prophet". Daniel Brown states that the first extant writings of Islamic legal reasoning were "virtually hadith-free" and argues that other examples of a lack of connection between sunnah and hadith can be found in:

- Kitāb al-Irjāʾ of al-Hasan b. Muhammad b. al-Hanafiyya;
- the first letter of Abdallah ibn Ibad to Abd al-Malik ibn Marwan;
- and the Risāla of Abu Hanifa addressed to ʿUthman al-Battī".

According to one source (Ahmad Kazemi Moussavi and Karim Douglas Crow), early Sunni scholars often considered sunnah equivalent to the biography of Muhammed (sira). As the hadith came to be better documented and the scholars who validated them gained prestige, the sunnah came often to be known mostly through the hadith, especially as variant or fictional biographies of Muhammad spread.

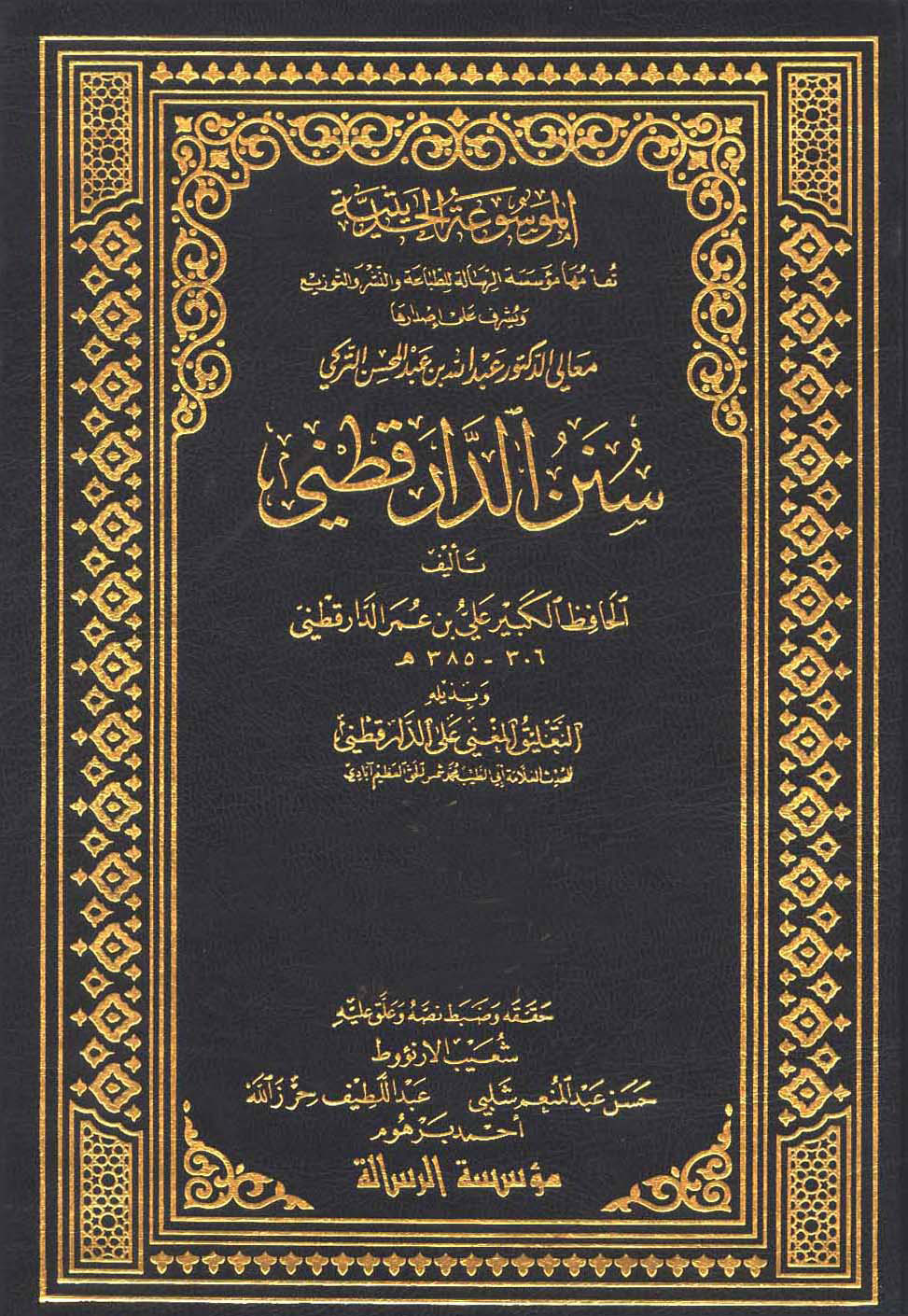
The Sunan ad-Darakutni, an important work for the implication of the sunnah

=== Four Madhhabs ===
The golden age, starting with the creation of the Hanafi, Maliki, Shafi'i, Hanbali, and other schools of fiqh in the second century of Islam, limited sunnah to "traditions traced back to the Prophet Muhammad himself" (sunna al-nabawiyyah). The ancient regional schools of law, located in several major cities of the new Arab empire of Islam, including Mecca, Kufa, Basra, and Syria, had a more flexible definition of sunnah than is now commonly used. This being the "acceptable norms" or "custom", which included examples of Muhammad's companions, the rulings of the Caliphs, and practices that "had gained general acceptance among the jurists of that school".

Abū ʿAbdullāh Muhammad ibn Idrīs al-Shāfiʿī (150–204 AH), known as al-Shafi'i, argued against flexible sunnah and the use of precedents from multiple sources, emphasizing the final authority of a hadith of Muhammad, so that even the Qur'an was "to be interpreted in the light of traditions (i.e. hadith), and not vice versa". While the sunnah has often been called "second to the Quran", hadith has also been said to "rule over and interpret the Quran". (Note: Ahmad Hasan calls the dictum that states: "The Sunnah decides upon the Qur'an, while the Qur'an does not decide upon the Sunnah" ألسنة قاضي على ألقرﺁن ,وليس ﺁلقرﺁن بقاض على ألسنة – "well known".) Al-Shafiʿi "forcefully argued" that the sunnah stands "on equal footing with the Quran" (according to scholar Daniel Brown), both being divine revelation. As Al-Shafi'i put it, "the command of the Prophet is the command of God" This, though, contradicts another point Shafi made, which was the sunnah was below the Quran.

Sunnah of Muhammad outranked all other, and "broad agreement" developed that "hadith must be the basis for authentication of any sunnah", (according to M. O. Farooq). Al-Shafiʿi's success was such that later writers "hardly ever thought of sunnah as comprising anything but that of the Prophet".

=== Systemization of hadith ===
While the earliest Muslim lawyers "felt no obligation" to provide documentation of hadith when arguing their case, and the sunnah was not recorded and written during Muhammad's lifetime, (according to scholar Khaled Abou El Fadl), all this changed with the triumph of al-Shafi'i and a "broad agreement" that hadith should be used to authenticate sunnah (according to M. O. Farooq), over the course of the second century, when legal works began incorporating Prophetic hadith.

Hadith was now systematically collected and documented, but several generations having passed since the time of its occurrence meant that "many of the reports attributed to the Prophet are apocryphal or at least are of dubious historical authenticity" (according to Abou El Fadl). "In fact, one of the most complex disciplines in Islamic jurisprudence is one which attempts to differentiate between authentic and inauthentic traditions." (Note: According to at least one source Abd Allah ibn 'Amr was one of the first companions to write down the hadith, after receiving permission from Muhammad to do so. Abu Hurayrah memorized the hadith.)

=== Classical Islam ===
Islam jurists divide sunnah into that which has no legal consequences – al-sunna al-ʿādīyah (the "personal habits and preferences" of Muhammad); and that which is binding on Muslims – al-sunna al-hudā. The literalist Zāhirī school disagrees holding that there was no sunnah whose fulfillment is not rewarded or neglect punished, while classical Islam holds that following non-binding al-sunna al-ʿādīyah is meritorious but not obligatory.

Sufis see the "division between binding and non-binding" sunnah as "meaningless". Muhammad is al-insān al-kāmil, the perfect man, labib-Allah beloved of God, an intercessor, a "channel of divine light". Imitating his every action is "the ultimate expression" of piety. or in the words of Al-Ghazālī:

Know that the key to joy is following the sunnah and imitating the Prophet in all his comings and goings, words and deeds, extending to his manner of eating, rising, sleeping and speaking. I do not say this only in relation to requirements of religion [ʿibādāt], for there is no escaping these; rather, this includes every area of behavior [ʿādāt].

=== Modernist Islam ===
In the 19th century, "social and political turmoil" starting with the decline of the Mughal Empire, caused some Muslims to seek a more humanized figure of Muhammad. The miracle-performing "larger than life" prophetic figure was de-emphasized in favor of "a practical model for restoration of the Muslim community", a virtuous, progressive social reformer. Nasserist Egypt, for example, celebrated the "imam of socialism" rather than the cosmic "perfect man". One who argued against the idea of sunnah as divine revelation, and for the idea that Muhammad's mission was simply to transmit the Quran was Ghulam Ahmed Perwez (1903–1985). He quoted the Quranic verse "The messenger has no duty except to proclaim [the message]" (Q.5:99), and pointed out several other verses where God corrects something Muhammad has done or said (8:67), (9:43), (66:1), thus demonstrating Muhammad's lack of supernatural knowledge.

This era of rapid social and technological change, decline of Muslim power, and replacement of classical madhhab by Western-inspired legal codes in Muslim lands, also suggested a turn away from the "detailed precedents in civil and political affairs", called for by traditional hadith, "for if worldly matters require detailed prophetic guidance, then every age will require a new prophet to accommodate changing circumstances".

=== Islamic revivalism ===
With de-colonialization in the late 20th century, a new Islamic revival emerged. Activists rather than theorists, they sought "to restore Islam to ascendency", and in particular to restore Sharia to the law of the lands of Islam it had been before being replaced by "secular, Western-inspired law codes" of colonialism and modernity. Like modernists, revivalists "vehemently rejected" taqlid and were not particularly interested in the classical schools of law (madhhab). But revivalists like Abul A'la Maududi and Mustafa al-Siba'i support for "the authority of sunnah and the authenticity of hadith in general" was "unwavering", as was their opposition to "Hadith denialism". At the same time they agreed that restoring relevant Sharia required "some reformulation" of the law, which would require a return to sources, which required agreement on how the sources were to be "interpreted and understand" and reassessment of hadith. This involved examining hadith content (matn) for its spirit and relevance "within the context of the Sharia as a whole" according to the method of scholars of Islamic law (fuqaha) and weeding out corrupted hadith inconsistent with "reason, with human nature, and with historical conditions". Shibli Nomani, Abul A'la Maududi, Rashid Rida, and Mohammed al-Ghazali being proponents of this effort.

== Alternatives to classical hadith-based sunnah ==
Although "most writers agree"—including skeptics—that "sunnah and hadith must stand or fall together", some (Fazlur Rahman Malik, Javed Ahmad Ghamidi) have attempted to "establish a basis for sunnah independent of hadith", working around the problem of hadithic authenticity raised by modernist and Western critics, while reaching back to a pre-al-Shafiʿi meaning of sunnah.

=== "Living sunnah" ===
In the 1960s, Fazlur Rahman Malik, an Islamic modernist and former head of Pakistan's Central Institute for Islamic Research, advanced the idea that the (prophetic) sunnah—the normative example of Muhammad—should be understood as "a general umbrella concept," not one "filled with absolutely specific content" or that was static over the centuries. He argued that Muhammad had come as a "moral reformer" and not a "pan-legit", and that the specifics of the sunnah would be agreed upon community of his followers, evolving with changing times as a "living and on-going process". He accepted the criticism of Western and Muslim scholars that the content of many hadith and isnad (chain of transmitters) had been tampered with by Muslims trying to prove the Muhammad had made a specific statement—but this did not make them fraudulent or forgeries, because if "Hadith verbally speaking does not go back to the Prophet, its spirit certainly does". Instead these collections of hadith of al-Bukhari and al-Muslim's were ijma (consensus or agreement of the Muslim scholars—which is another classical source of Islamic law). Doing so, they follow the spirit of Muhammad's mission, and "resurrect" the legal methodology of the pre-Shafi'i "Ancient schools". But just as second and third century Muslims could re-formulate hadith and law around a prophetic spirit, so can modern Muslims—redefining riba and replacing medieval laws against bank interest with measures that help the poor without harming economic productivity.

=== Sunnah from practice not hadith ===
Some of the most basic and important features of the sunnah – worship rituals like salat (ritual prayer), zakat (ritual tithing), hajj (pilgrimage to Mecca), sawm (dawn to dusk fasting during Ramadan) – are known to Muslim from being passed down 'from the many to the many' (according to scholars of fiqh such as Al-Shafi'i), bypassing books of hadith, (which were more often consulted for answers to details not agreed upon or not frequently practiced) and issues of authenticity.

Modernist Rashid Rida thought this "the only source of sunnah that is beyond dispute". S.M. Yusuf argued "practice is best transmitted through practice", and a more reliable way to establish sunnah than hadith. He also believed that the passing down of practice from generation to generation independent of hadith explained why early schools of law did not differentiate between sunnah of the caliphate and sunnah of the prophet. According to Javed Ahmad Ghamidi, another Modernist, this passing down by continuous practice of the Muslim community (which also indicates consensus, ijma) was similar to how the Qur’ān has been "received by the ummah" (Muslim community) through the consensus of the Muhammad's companions and through their perpetual recitation. Consequently, Ghamidi sees this more limited sunnah of continuous practice as the true sunnah – equally authentic to the Quran, but shedding orthodox sunnah and avoiding problematic basis of the hadith.

=== "Inner states" ===
Sufi thinkers "emphasized personal spirituality and piety rather than the details of fiqh". According to the view of some Sufi Muslims who incorporate both the outer and inner reality of Muhammad, the deeper and true sunnah are the noble characteristics and inner state of Muhammad – Khuluqin Azim or "Exalted Character". To them Muhammad's attitude, his piety, the quality of his character constitute the truer and deeper aspect of what it means by sunnah in Islam, rather than the external aspects alone. They argue that the external custom of Muhammad loses its meaning without the inner attitude and also many hadiths are simply custom of the Arabs, not something that is unique to Muhammad.

== Basis of importance ==
The Qur'an contains numerous commands to follow Muhammad. Among the Quranic verses quoted as demonstrating the importance of hadith/sunnah to Muslims are:

Say: Obey Allah and obey the Messenger.

Which appears in several verses: 3:32, 5:92, 24:54, 64:12

Your fellow man is neither misguided nor astray. Nor does he speak of his own whims.

— Surah An-Najm 53:2-3

Since We have sent you a messenger from among yourselves—reciting to you Our revelations, purifying you, teaching you the Book and wisdom, and teaching you what you never knew

— Surah Al-Baqara 2:151

Indeed, in the Messenger of Allah you have an excellent example for whoever has hope in Allah and the Last Day, and remembers Allah often.

— Surah Al-Ahzab 33:21

The teachings of "wisdom" (hikma) have been declared to be a function of Muhammad along with the teachings of the scripture. Several Quranic verses mention "wisdom" (hikmah) coupled with "scripture" or "the book" (i.e. the Quran) – al-kitāb wa al-ḥikma. Mainstream scholars starting with al-Shafi'i believe hikma refers to the sunnah, and this connection between sunnah and the Quran is evidence of the sunnah's divinity and authority.

- 4:113 – "For Allah hath sent down to thee the Book and wisdom and taught thee what thou Knewest not (before): and great is the Grace of Allah unto thee."
- 2:231 – "...but remember Allah's grace upon you and that which He hath revealed unto you of the Scripture and of wisdom, whereby He doth exhort you."
- 33:34 – "And bear in mind which is recited in your houses of the revelations of God and of wisdom."

Therefore, along with the Quran, the sunnah was revealed. Modern Sunni scholars have examined both the sira and the hadith in order to justify modifications to jurisprudence (fiqh). Hence, the imitation of Muhammad helps Muslims to know and be loved by God.

Another piece of evidence for the divinity of the Sunnah—according to its supporters—are verses in the Quran that refer to revelations not found in the Quran. For example, there is no verse mentioning the original direction of prayer (the qibla) in the Quran, but God in the Quran does say He appointed the original qibla (2:143). Other events mentioned in the Quran that already happened without Quranic command or description include a dream in which Muhammad would enter Mecca (2:231); Muhammad's marriage to Zayd's ex-wife (33:37); and the dispute over the division of spoils after the Battle of Badr ^{[ 8:7]}; all "definitive proof that besides the Quran other commands came to the Prophet by the agency of waḥy", according to revivalist Abul A'la Maududi. Yet another piece of evidence offered is that "Prophet witness" is "the chief guarantee" of what is divine revelation. In other words, "Muslims only know the Quran is revelation because of Muhammad's testimony to this fact. If prophetic word is not to be trusted, then the Quran itself is open to suspicion." Since the Quran is not, the sunnah must be trustworthy.

=== Alternative view ===
The minority argument against the sunnah of Muhammad being divine revelation (waḥy) goes back to the ahl al-Kalam who al-Shāfiʿī argued against in the second century of Islam. Their modern "Quranists", the modern successors of the ahl al-Kalam, argue that the sunnah falls short of the standard of the Quran in divinity. Specifically because

1. with the exception of the ḥadīth qudsī, sunnah was not revealed and transmitted verbatim, as was the Quran; it was often transmitted giving the sense or gist of what was said (known as bi'l-maʿnā);
2. the process of revelation was not "external, entirely independent of the influence of the messenger"; it bares the "personality" or "mentality" (baṣīrat) of Muhammad;
3. unlike the Quran, it was not "preserved in writing" until over a century after Muhammad's death, which opens the question of how much corruption and/or error entered the writings and why, if it was divinely revealed, eternal truth, orders were not given to the earliest Muslims to write it down as they were for the Quran.

=== Providing examples ===
According to John Burton, paraphrasing Al-Shafi'i, "it must be remembered that the Quran text are couched in very general terms which it is the function of the sunnah to expand and elucidate, to make God's meaning absolutely clear." There are a number of verses in the Quran where "to understand the context, as well as the meaning", Muslims need to refer to the record of the life and example of Muhammad.

It is thought that verses 16:44 and 64 indicate that Muhammed's mission "is not merely that of a deliveryman who simply delivers the revelation from Allah to us, rather, he has been entrusted with the most important task of explaining and illustrating" the Quran.

˹We sent them˺ with clear proofs and divine Books. And We have sent down to you ˹O Prophet˺ the Reminder, so that you may explain to people what has been revealed for them, and perhaps they will reflect.

— Surah An-Nahl 16:64

We have revealed to you the Book only to clarify for them what they differed about, and as a guide and mercy for those who believe.

— Surah An-Nahl 16:64

For example, while the Quran presents the general principles of praying, fasting, paying zakat, or making pilgrimage, they are presented "without the illustration found in Hadith, for these acts of worship remain as abstract imperatives in the Qur'an".

== Types of sunnah ==
Sunnah upon which fiqh is based may be divided into:

- Sunnah Qawliyyah – the sayings of Muhammad, generally synonymous with "hadith", since the sayings of Muhammad are noted down by the companions and called "hadith".
- Sunnah Amaliyyah – the actions of Muhammad, including both religious and worldly actions.
- Sunnah Taqririyyah – the approvals of Muhammad regarding the actions of the Companions which occurred in two different ways:
  - When Muhammad kept silent for an action and did not oppose it.
  - When Muhammad showed his pleasure and smiled for a companion's action.

It may be also divided into sunnah that is binding for Muslims and that which is not. Ibn Qutaybah (213-276 AH) distinguished between:

1. sunnah "brought by Gabriel";
2. sunnah from "Muhammad's own ra'y and is binding, but subject to revision";
3. "non-binding sunnah", which Muslims are not subject to "penalty for failure to follow".

In the terminology of fiqh (Islamic jurisprudence), sunnah denotes whatever though not obligatory, is "firmly established (thabata) as called for (matlub)" in Islam "on the basis of a legal proof (dalîl shar`î).

=== Sciences of sunnah ===
According to scholar Gibril Fouad Haddad, the "sciences of the Sunnah" ('ulûm as-Sunna) refer to:

the biography of the Prophet (as-sîra), the chronicle of his battles (al-maghâzî), his everyday sayings and acts or "ways" (sunan), his personal and moral qualities (ash-shamâ'il), and the host of the ancillary hadîth sciences such as the circumstances of occurrence (asbâb al-wurûd), knowledge of the abrogating and abrogated hadîth, difficult words (gharîb al-hadîth), narrator criticism (al-jarh wat-ta`dîl), narrator biographies (al-rijâl), etc., as discussed in great detail in the authoritative books of al-Khatîb al-Baghdâdî.

== In Shia community ==
Shia Muslims do not follow the Kutub al-Sittah (six major hadith collections) followed in Sunni Islam, therefore in Shia and Sunni Islam, the sunnah refer to different collections of religious canonical literature.

The primary collections of Shia community were written by three authors known as the "Three Muhammads", and they are:

- Kitab al-Kafi by Muhammad ibn Ya'qub al-Kulayni al-Razi (329 AH);
- Man la yahduruhu al-Faqih by Ibn Babawayh and Tahdhib al-Ahkam; and
- Al-Istibsar, both by Shaykh Tusi.

Unlike Akhbari Twelver Shiites, Usuli Twelver Shiite scholars do not believe that everything in the four major books of the Shia is authentic.

In Shia hadees one often finds sermons attributed to Ali in The Four Books or in the Nahj al-Balagha.

== See also ==
- Bid'ah
- Categories of Hadith
- Sharia
