= Rashad Khalifa =

Egyptian-American Quranist (1935–1990)

Dr. Rashad Khalifa

Personal life
- Born: November 19, 1935 Kingdom of Egypt
- Died: January 31, 1990 (aged 54) Tucson, Arizona, United States
- Cause of death: Assassination
- Children: Sam Khalifa and Beth Bujarski
- Notable work: Quran - the Final Testament
- Education: Ain Shams University; University of Arizona; University of California, Riverside

Religious life
- Religion: Submission (Quranist Islam)

Rashad Khalifa (Arabic: رشاد خليفة; November 19, 1935 – January 31, 1990) was an Egyptian-American biochemist, closely associated with the United Submitters International (USI), an organization that promotes the practice and study of "Quran, the Whole Quran, and Nothing But the Quran." Khalifa saw his role as purging the accretions that found their way into Islam via hadith and sunnah, which he claimed were corruptions. Similarly, he believed that previous revelations of God, such as the Bible, contained contradictions due to human interference (a concept known as tahrif). Instead, he believed that the beliefs and practices of Islam should be based on the Quran alone. He is also known for his claims regarding the existence of a Quran code, also known as The Number 19. In the last years of his life, Khalifa used the English words “Submission” and “Submitter” instead of the Arabic words ‘Islam’ and “Muslim”, and stated this in his publications and used it in his 1989 translation of the Qur'an.

His changing views regarding the essence of faith, recorded in his two renditions of the Quran, and declaring himself as a divine messenger who communicated with Gabriel, drew opposition from other Muslims. On January 31, 1990, Khalifa was found stabbed to death inside the Mosque of Tucson, in Arizona, which he founded.

== Life ==
Khalifa was born in Egypt on November 19, 1935. He obtained an honors degree from Ain Shams University, before he immigrated to the United States in 1959. He later earned a Master's Degree in biochemistry from University of Arizona and a Ph.D. from University of California, Riverside. He became a naturalized U.S. citizen and lived in Tucson, Arizona. He was married to an American woman and they had a son and a daughter together.

Khalifa worked as a science adviser for the Libyan government for about one year, after which he worked as a chemist for the United Nations Industrial Development Organization. He next worked as a senior chemist in Arizona's State Office of Chemistry in 1980.

He founded the United Submitters International (USI), an organization that promulgated his beliefs.

== Doctrine ==
He saw his role as purging the accretions that found their way into Islam via hadith and sunnah, which he claimed were corrupted. Similarly, he believed that previous revelations of God, such as the Bible, contained contradictions due to human interference (a concept known as tahrif). Instead, he believed that the beliefs and practices of Islam should be based on the Quran alone.

Starting in 1968, Khalifa used computers to analyze the frequency of letters and words in the Quran. He published his findings in 1973 in the book Miracle of the Quran: Significance of the Mysterious Alphabets, in 1981 in the book The Computer Speaks: God's Message to the World, and in 1982 in the book Quran: Visual Presentation of the Miracle. Khalifa claimed that the Quran, unlike the Hadith, was incorruptible because it contained a mathematical structure based on the number 19, namely the Quran code or known as Code 19. For example, he claimed that this mathematical structure rejected the Quranic verses 9:128-129. Most Muslims object to this interpretation. However, Khalifa believed this mathematical structure prevented the Quran from being adulterated and that it was proof of its divine authorship.

Khalifa's research did not receive much attention in the West. In 1980, Martin Gardner mentioned it in Scientific American. Gardner later wrote a more extensive and critical review of Khalifa and his work.

== Assassination ==
On January 31, 1990, Khalifa was found stabbed to death inside the mosque of Tucson, Arizona, which he founded.

Nineteen years after the murder, on April 28, 2009, the Calgary Police Service arrested Glen Cusford Francis, a 52-year-old citizen of Trinidad and Tobago, on suspicion of having killed Rashad Khalifa. Investigators in Tucson learned that Francis, who was going by the name Benjamin Phillips, had begun his studies under Khalifa in January 1990. Phillips disappeared shortly after the slaying, and was said to have left the country. An investigation revealed Phillips and Francis were the same man when the police analyzed fingerprints found in Phillips' apartment. A specialty unit of the Tucson Police Department progressed in its investigation in 2006 and in December 2008, and was able to use DNA testing on forensic evidence from the crime scene to tie Francis to the assassination. In October 2009, a Canadian judge ordered Francis's extradition to the United States to face trial.

The trial for the murder began on December 11, 2012. On December 19, the jury, after a three-hour deliberation, found Glen Francis guilty of first-degree murder and sentenced him to life in prison. Prior to the Francis trial, James Williams, an alleged member of the Jamaat ul-Fuqra organization, was convicted of conspiracy in the slaying. Williams disappeared in 1994 on the day of his sentencing. In 2000, Williams was apprehended attempting to re-enter the United States and was sentenced to serve 69 years in prison. In 2003, his convictions were upheld on appeal by the Colorado Court of Appeals, except for one count of forgery.

== Bibliography ==
- Miracle of the Quran: Significance of the Mysterious Alphabets, Islamic Productions, St. Louis, Missouri, 1973.
- The Computer Speaks: God's Message to the World, Renaissance Productions, Tucson, Arizona, 1981.
- Qur'an: The Final Scripture, Islamic Productions, Tucson, Arizona, 1981.
- Qur'an: Visual Presentation of the Miracle, Islamic Productions, Tucson, Arizona, 1982.
- Qur'an, Hadith and Islam, Islamic Productions, Tucson, Arizona, 1982.
- Qur'an: The Final Testament, Islamic Productions, Tucson, Arizona, 1989.

== See also ==
- Criticism of Hadith
