= Categories of Hadith =

Different categories of hadith (sayings attributed to the Islamic prophet Muhammad) have been used by various scholars. Experts in hadith studies generally use two terms - taqrīr for tacit approvals, and khabar for sayings and acts ascribed to Muhammad.

The term taqrīr implies that, in the presence of Muhammad a believer did something, which the Prophet noticed but did not disapprove or condemn. Thus, the act done by a believer acquired tacit approval from Muhammad. It is commonly acknowledged that a khabar can be true or false. The scholars of the science of hadith criticism hold that a khabar and, therefore, a hadith can be a true report or a concoction. It is on the basis of this premise that the Muslim scholars hold that a hadith offers a ẓannī (inconclusive/probably true) evidence. It is as though a hadith may have many possibilities on the plane of reliability. This classification refers to non-absolute, subjective evaluations that express the conclusions reached by the hadith writer as a result of his own studies and evaluations. What one hadith writer finds reliable, another may regard it as weak or even fabricated.

== Categorization based on reliability ==
- Categories of hadith
  Ṣaḥīḥ - transmitted through an unbroken chain of narrators all of whom are of sound character and memory. Such a hadith should not clash with a more reliable report and must not suffer from any other hidden defect.
- Ḥasan - transmitted through an unbroken chain of narrators all of whom are of sound character but at least one of whom possessed weak memory. This hadith should not clash with a more reliable report and must not suffer from any other hidden defect.
- Ḍaʻīf - below the status of hasan because it lacks one or more elements of a hasan hadith. (For example, if the narrator is not of sound memory and sound character, or if there is a hidden fault in the narrative or if the chain of narrators is broken).
- Mawḍūʻ - fabricated and wrongly ascribed to Muhammad. (For example, if the chain of narrators includes a known liar).
- Maqlūb - It is that hadith, in two different narrations of which the names of narrators have been changed.

== Categorization based on number of narrators ==
- Khabar-i mutawatir - A mutawatir hadith is reported by such a large number of narrators that cannot be perceived to have jointly forged and narrated a tradition about an issue without a compelling force.
- Khabar-i wāhid (pl.: akhbār-i āhād)- signifies a historical narrative that falls short of yielding certain knowledge. Even if more than one person reports the narrative, that does not make it certain and conclusive truth except when the number of narrators reporting it grows to the level that the possibility of their consensus on forging a lie is perfectly removed.

== Classification by epistemic value ==
In one of the major works in the science of hadith, Al-Khatib al-Baghdadi has divided the individual narratives in the following categories, according to their epistemic value:

- A hadith which are clearly genuine and acceptable

1. The narratives that contain reports testified by the "human intellect" (mimmā tadullu al-‘uqūl ‘alā mūjabihī) and that which are aligned with common sense.
2. The narratives that are a corollary of the Quranic text and the Sunnah.
3. The narratives that have been received as acceptable by the ummah as a whole.

- A hadith which are clear fabrications

1. The narratives that offend reason.
2. The narratives that contradict the Quran and the Sunnah.
3. The narratives that discuss issues of prime importance in the religion which require absolute certainty.
4. The individual narratives regarding issues which, by their very nature, demand that they should have been reported by a large number of people are also not acceptable.

According to the Hanafi jurists, in the issues of ‘umūm-i balwā (issues which by nature attract attention of the entire community. For example, the number and form of the Prayer by its position in the religion requires that it should be received, practiced and communicated by the entire generation. Such issues are not left on the choice of few individuals.), the individual narratives carry no weight. In such issues they prefer qiyas and ijtihad over these types of individual narratives.

- A hadith whose status is not clear

1. Narratives that give contradicting directives on a single issue and make it difficult to determine the final command in that regard form the third category. While deciding on the applicability of the directives contained in these types of ahadith, only such narratives should be accepted as valid which correspond to and accord with the wording of the collated narratives, textual evidence from the Quran and the Sunnah.

== See also ==
- History of hadith
- Hadith terminology
- Hadith studies
- Biographical evaluation
