= Tartib al-Musnad =

Hadith collection of the Ibadi branch of Islam

Tartib al-Musnad is the principal hadith collection of the Ibadi branch of Islam. It has one thousand and five individual hadiths, some of which are also found in Sunni hadiths. The collection is not used outside Ibadism. It is a "musnad", that is to say, a collection of hadiths organized into parts according to which narrator is the source of each hadith. (Other collections are generally organized into parts according to the subject of the hadiths.)

== History ==
Tartib al-Musnad is a rearrangement and expansion of the hadith collection Jami Sahih compiled by Al-Rabi' bin Habib Al-Farahidi in the Islamic second century. Abu Yaaqub Yusef bin Ibrahim al-Warjilani (d. 570/1175) rearranged the collection and added further narratives.

== Contents ==
The work is divided into four parts:

- the first two parts contain 742 muttasil hadith
- the third part contain narrations from al-Rabi' and Abu Yaqub
- the fourth part contains further hadith added by Abu Yaqub from various sources.

The 263 hadith of parts three and four are those added by Abu Yaqub's work.
