= Sam Khalifa =

American baseball player (born 1963)

- Shortstop
- Born: December 5, 1963 (age 62); Fontana, California, U.S.
- Batted: Right Threw: Right

MLB debut
- June 25, 1985, for the Pittsburgh Pirates

Last MLB appearance
- July 31, 1987, for the Pittsburgh Pirates

MLB statistics
- Batting average: .219
- Home runs: 2
- Runs batted in: 37
- Stats at Baseball Reference

Teams
- Pittsburgh Pirates (1985–1987)

Sam Khalifa (born December 5, 1963) is an American former professional baseball player. An infielder, Khalifa played in Major League Baseball (MLB) for the Pittsburgh Pirates from 1985 through 1987. The first (and to date, only) practicing Muslim to play in the majors, he retired from baseball when his father, Islamic scholar Rashad Khalifa, was murdered in 1990.

== Early life ==
Khalifa was born in Fontana, California, while his father, Rashad Khalifa, obtained a Ph.D in Biochemistry at the University of California, Riverside. As a child, he relocated to the Middle East on two occasions. When he was a few months old, his family moved to Alexandria, Egypt, where his father worked for the Egyptian government. After three years in Egypt, the Khalifas moved to St. Louis, Missouri, where they lived for seven years. They then moved to Tripoli, Libya, as his father consulted for the Libyan government for a year. Then, his family moved to Tucson, Arizona.

== Career ==
Khalifa attended Sahuaro High School in Tucson. For the school's football team he played quarterback and was named All-City by the Arizona Daily Star. He received several Division I football scholarship offers to play quarterback. He also played shortstop on the school's baseball team, which won the Class 5A state championship, defeating Phoenix Brophy High School. He was named the Arizona High school Player of the Year in 1982 and also selected to the 1982 All American Baseball Team.

Khalifa was chosen by the Pittsburgh Pirates as the seventh overall selection in the 1982 Major League Baseball draft. Though he signed a letter of intent to attend Arizona State University, Khalifa signed with the Pirates, receiving a $100,000 signing bonus. In 1982, he played for the Gulf Coast Pirates of the Rookie-level Gulf Coast League (GCL) and the Greenwood Pirates of the Class A South Atlantic League. In 48 games played for Greenwood, Khalifa had a .305 batting average. He played six games for the GCL Pirates. In 1983, he played for the Alexandria Dukes of the Class A Carolina League and made the All Star team, batting .270 in 103 games, and received five games of playing time for the Lynn Sailors of the Class AA Eastern League.

Khalifa spent the 1984 season with the Nashua Pirates of the Eastern League in 1984. He batted .238 in Nashua in 91 games, as he missed playing time when he fractured his wrist on two occasions. Pirates' manager Chuck Tanner wanted Khalifa to begin the 1985 season as a member of the Pirates' major league roster, but Pete Peterson, the Pirates' general manager, decided that Khalifa needed to spend time in Class AAA before he would be ready for the major leagues. Khalifa started the 1985 season with the Hawaii Islanders of the Class AAA Pacific Coast League, and after batting .282 for the Islanders, he made his MLB debut on June 25, 1985, replacing the injured Johnnie LeMaster, becoming the sixth player to start for the Pirates at shortstop during the 1985 season. The Pirates began the season with Tim Foli and Rafael Belliard. Foli received his release, while Belliard had been demoted to Hawaii. Jerry Dybzinski received one game at shortstop for the Pirates, who was followed by Bill Almon, and the trade acquisition of LeMaster from the Cleveland Indians.

Khalifa recorded six hits in his first eleven at-bats. In his rookie season, he had a .238 batting average across 95 games played. In 1986, Khalifa platooned at shortstop with Rafael Belliard, as Khalifa struggled, batting .185. He was sent down to the minor leagues, and Jay Bell solidified himself as the Pirates' starting shortstop. Khalifa played for the Vancouver Canadiens of the Pacific Coast League in 1987. He split the 1988 season with the Harrisburg Senators of the Eastern League and the Buffalo Bisons of the Class AAA International League. He again played for Buffalo in 1989. One day, he was five minutes late for the team bus, it left without him, and he returned home to Tucson.

Joe L. Brown, the former general manager of the Pirates, arranged a tryout for Khalifa with the San Diego Padres in 1990. Khalifa quit baseball without attending the tryout following the murder of his father. He played 164 games across three seasons in the majors, most as a shortstop. His primary historical importance arises from his status as the first man of Egyptian descent to play major league baseball. He ended his career with a .219 batting average, a .294 on-base percentage, and a .285 slugging percentage.

== Personal life ==
Khalifa's father, Rashad Khalifa, was murdered on January 31, 1990. Islamic extremists opposed to his teachings were connected to it. Trinidad and Tobago national Glen Cusford Francis was arrested in Calgary on April 28, 2009, in connection with the elder Khalifa's murder. Francis was convicted of Khalifa's murder.

Khalifa is no longer involved with professional baseball. He currently resides in Tucson, Arizona, where he purchased his parents' house. He coaches both baseball and football at Sahuaro High School.
