= Ban of Hadiths =

Ban by Umar, second Rashidun Caliph

The ban on Hadith is a historical tradition (Arabic: حديث, ḥadīth), which says that Umar, the second Caliph of the Rashidun Caliphate (ruled 634-644 CE) ordered a ban on the writing down of oral traditions about the Islamic Prophet Muhammad, who died in 632 CE. Although the tradition is prominently quoted and referred to, it was not given any formal name, in contrast to other Hadiths such as the Hadith of the pond of Khumm or the Hadith of the thaqalayn.

== Introduction ==
During Umar's reign as Caliph, hadith were not being narrated by the people.

Many sources state that it was Umar himself who was the first person to ban hadith. Certainly during his rule Umar strictly followed the policy of banning the hadith and prohibited reporting and transmission of hadith altogether. Whenever he sent a group to a city, he would prohibit them from narrating hadith.

This banning continued through the caliphate of the Rashidun caliphs into the Umayyad period and did not cease until the period of Umar ibn 'Abd al-'Aziz, who ruled from 717 to 720 CE.

== Mainstream Muslim view ==
Muslims view this hadith as notable and important on several accounts: several prominent persons are mentioned in the hadith and several controversial issues are dealt with.

=== Sunni view ===
Muhammad Husayn Haykal

Umar ibn al-Khattab once tried to deal with the problem of committing the Hadith to writing. The companions of the Prophet whom he consulted, encouraged him, but he was not quite sure whether he should proceed. One day, moved by God's inspiration, he made up his mind and announced: "I wanted to have the traditions of the Prophet written down, but I fear that the Book of God might be encroached upon. Hence I shall not permit this to happen." He, therefore, changed his mind and instructed the Muslims throughout the provinces: "Whoever has a document bearing a prophetic tradition, shall destroy it." The Hadith, therefore, continued to be transmitted orally and was not collected and written down until the period of al-Mamun.

Dr. Mohammad Hamidullah

The story of Abu Bakr burning the hadith he had collected is not authentic, as reported by Ath-Thahabi in Tadhkirat Al-Huffaath. He quoted:

Tadhkirat Al-Huffaath reports: The Caliph Abu-Bakr compiled a work, in which there were 500 traditions of the Prophet, and handed it over to his daughter 'Aishah. The next morning, he took it back from her and destroyed it, saying: "I wrote what I understood; it is possible however that there should be certain things in it which did not correspond textually with what the Prophet had uttered." As to Umar, we learn on the authority of Ma'mar ibn Rashid, that during his caliphate, Umar once consulted the companions of the Prophet on the subject of codifying the Hadith. Everybody seconded the idea. Yet Umar continued to hesitate and pray to God for a whole month for guidance and enlightenment. Ultimately, he decided not to undertake the task, and said: "Former peoples neglected the Divine Books and concentrated only on the conduct of the prophets; I do not want to set up the possibility of confusion between the Divine Qur’an and the Prophet's Hadith."

Ath-Thahabi then said: "This narration is not authentic, and Allah knows best."

Kanz Al-'Ummaal said: "Ibn Katheer said about this story and its chain of narrators: "This is a very strange hadith, because Ali ibn Salih is an unknown narrator."

=== Shi'a view ===
Ali Asgher Razwy, a 20th century Shi'a Islamic scholar writes:

Muhammad, the Apostle of God, had expressed the wish, on his deathbed, to write his will, and as noted before, Umar had thwarted him by shouting that the Book of God was sufficient for the Muslim umma, and that it did not need any other writing from him.

Umar, it appears, actually believed in what he said, viz., a will or any other writing of the Prophet was redundant since Qur’an had the ultimate answers to all the questions. And if any doubts still lingered in anyone's mind on this point, he removed them when he became khalifa.

Muhammad lived in the hearts of his companions and friends. After his death, they wished to preserve all their recollections of his life. These recollections were of two kinds - his words and his deeds. The two together formed his Sunnah (the trodden path). Anything he said, and was quoted by a companion, is called a hadith or ‘tradition.'

But Umar did not want the companions to preserve any recollection of the words and the deeds of the Prophet. He, apparently, had many reservations regarding the usefulness, to the Muslim umma, of these recollections. He, therefore, forbade the companions to quote the sayings of the Prophet in speech or in writing. In other words, he placed the Hadith of the Prophet under a proscription.
