= Edip Yüksel =

Kurdish American activist and Quranist (born 1957)

Dr. Edip Yüksel
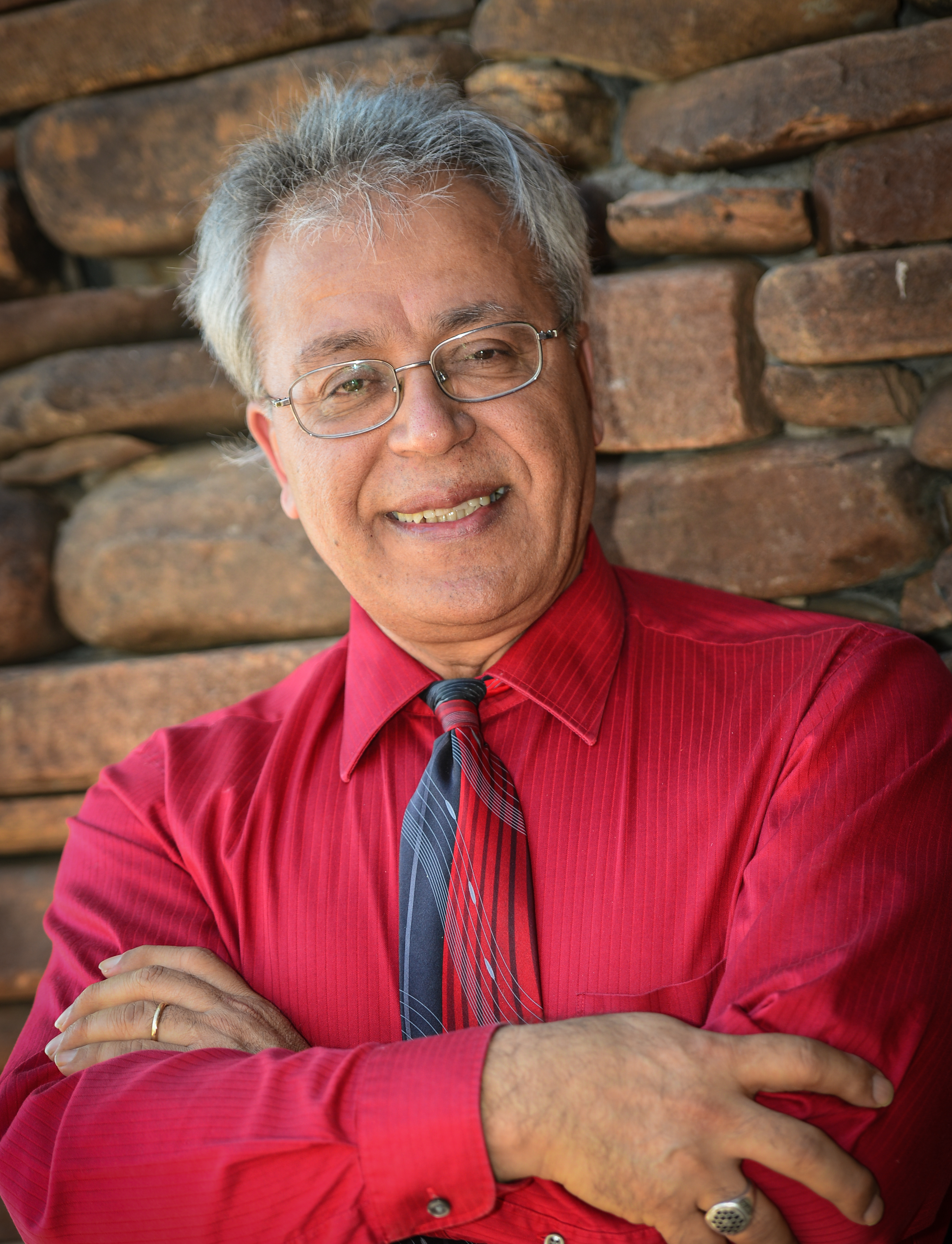

Personal life
- Born: 20 December 1957 (age 68) Güroymak, Bitlis, Turkey
- Parent: Sadrettin Yüksel (father)
- Main interest(s): Religion, philosophy, law
- Education: Middle East Technical University; Boğaziçi University

Religious life
- Religion: Islam
- Denomination: Quranism

Muslim leader
- Influenced by: Rashad Khalifa
- Website: 19.org

Edip Yüksel (born December 20, 1957) is an American-Kurdish activist and prominent figure in the Quranism movement. Born in Güroymak, Yuksel is the author of more than twenty books on religion, politics, philosophy and law in Turkish. After settling in the United States, where he began his career as a lawyer, he became a colleague and friend of Rashad Khalifa. However, his interpretation of the Qur'an has differed with Khalifa on a number of issues, and his work has represented a new trend within the Quranist movement.

== Biography ==
Yüksel comes from a Kurdish family who lived in Turkey, and is brother of Metin Yüksel. He is the author of more than twenty books on religion, politics, philosophy and law in Turkish. He has also written various articles and essays in English. He was a Turkish Islamist and a popular Islamic commentator until the mid-1980s when he rejected his previous religious beliefs and only used the Quran as the source of divine laws. He became a Quran-only Muslim, or known as Quranist. However, this movement is very controversial in the main Muslim circles, and thus Yüksel gained the rejection and hostility of many religious Islamic authorities in his home country. In 1989 Yüksel was forced to emigrate. He then settled in the United States of America, where he began his career as a lawyer. In the US, he worked with Rashad Khalifa, who claimed to have discovered a Quran code, also known as Code 19, in the Quran and called on Muslims to return to the Quran alone and to abandon all hadiths.

Yüksel is critical of Islamic creationists, such as Harun Yahya.

Professor Aisha Musa, from Florida International University, says in her book Hadith as Scripture about Yüksel:

Although Yüksel initially came to his belief that the Qur'an is the only legitimate source of religious guidance in Islam, his own writings show much more independence than does the work of Kassim Ahmad. Like Khalifa and Ahmad, Yüksel rejects the Hadith using the same Qur'anic criteria. However, he differs with Khalifa in his interpretation of the Qur'an on a number of issues, [...]. Yüksel's work represent a new trend that has emerged in the modern-day Qur'anist movement in the last several years[.]

== English Books ==
- 19 Nineteen: God's Signature in Nature and Scripture
- Peacemaker's Guide to Warmongers: Exposing Robert Spencer, David Horowitz, and other
- 19 Questions for Muslim Scholars
- Test Your Quranic Knowledge
- 19 Questions for Christian Clergy
- An Unconventional Skirmish on "Unintentional" Lies
- Unorthodox Articles
- The Prime Argument
- Running Like Zebras: An Internet Debate
- Miscellanous Articles on Philosophy and Law
- Quran: A Reformist Translation
- Manifesto for Islamic Reform

== Turkish Books ==
- Yusuf'un 40. Emri
- Kur'an'da Demirin Kimyasal Esrarı
- Kur'an: Görülen Mucize
- İlginç Sorular-1
- İlginç Sorular-2
- Kitap Okumanın Zararları
- Sakıncalı Yazılar
- Müslüman Din Adamlarına 19 Soru
- Türkçe Kur'an Çevirilerindeki Hatalar
- Üzerinde 19 Var
- Demokrasi/Oligarşi/Teokrasi
- Asal Tartışma
- Mesaj: Kur'an Çevirisi
- Mor Mektuplar
- Hristiyan Din Adamlarına 19 Soru
- Takanlar ve Takılanlar Politik ve Dini Açıdan Türban Nedir? Ne Değildir?
- Norşin'den Arizona'ya - Sıradan Bir Adamın Sıradışı Öyküsü
