= Jami Sahih =

Jami Sahih is, along with Tartib al-Musnad, the most important hadith collection for Ibadis. It was compiled by Al-Rabi' bin Habib Al-Farahidi and later on organized and arranged by Yusuf Ibrahim al-Warjilani (يوسف إبراهيم الوارجلاني). The most frequent transmitter is Jabir ibn Zayd.
