= Quran code =

Hypothetical mathematical code in the Quran

The term Quran code (also known as Code 19) refers to the claim that the Quranic text contains a hidden mathematically complex pattern. The claimed code is based on alleged multiple appearances of the number 19 in counts of words, letters and surahs. Advocates believe that the code represents a mathematical proof of the divine authorship of the Quran. The most notable proponent was Rashad Khalifa.

== History ==
In 1969, Rashad Khalifa, an Egyptian-American biochemist, began analyzing the separated letters of the Quran (also called Quranic initials or Muqattaʿat), and the Quran to examine certain sequences of numbers. In 1973 he published the book Miracle of the Quran: Significance of the Mysterious Alphabets, in which he describes the Quranic initials through enumerations and distributions.

In 1974, Khalifa claimed to have discovered a mathematical code hidden in the Quran, a code based around the number 19. He wrote the book The Computer Speaks: God's Message to the World, in which he thematizes this Quran code. He relies on Surah 74, verse 30 to prove the significance of the number: "Over it is nineteen".

Proponents of the code include United Submitters International (an association initiated by Rashad Khalifa) as well as some Quranists and traditional Muslims.

== Example ==
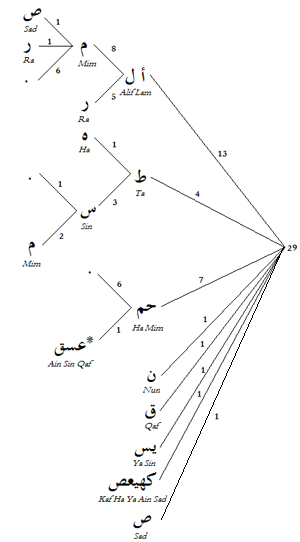
A tree diagram of the Qur'anic initial letters, The Quran Code argues that these letters are repeated in multiples of 19 in the relevant surahs.

Believers in Quran Code often use certain word counts, checksums and cross sums to legitimize the code.

Edip Yüksel, a Turkish Quranistic author and colleague of Rashad Khalifa, makes the following claims in his book Nineteen: God's Signature in Nature and Scripture:

- The Bismillah (bismi ʾllāhi ʾr-raḥmāni ʾr-raḥīm), the Quranic opening formula, which, with one exception, is at the beginning of every Surah of the Quran, consists of exactly 19 letters.
- The first word of the Bismillah, Ism (name), without contraction, occurs 19 times in the Quran (19×1). [Also no plural forms, or those with pronoun endings]
- The second word of the Bismillah, Allah (God), occurs 2698 times (19×142).
- The third word of the Bismillah, Rahman (Gracious), occurs 57 times (19×3).
- The fourth word of the Bismillah, Rahim (Merciful), occurs 114 times (19×6).
- The multiplication factors of the words of the Bismillah (1+142+3+6) give 152 (19×8).
- The Quran consists of 114 chapters (19×6).
- The total number of verses in the Quran including all unnumbered Bismillahs is 6346 (19×334). The cross sum of 6346 is 19.
- The Bismillah appears 114 times (despite its absence in chapter 9, it appears twice in chapter 27); 114 is 19×6.
- From the missing Bismillah in chapter 9 to the additional Bismillah in chapter 27, there are exactly 19 chapters.
- The occurrence of the additional Bismillah is in Surah 27:30. Adding this chapter number and the verse number gives 57 (19×3).

== The separated letters in the Quran ==
The Quran consists of 114 Surahs, of which a total of 29 Surahs are provided with separated letters, Muqattaʿat or also called Quranic initials. These are listed in the following table:

Number of the Surah	Initial letter(s)	Number of verses in that Surah
2	Alif–Lām–Mīm	286
3	Alif–Lām–Mīm	200
7	Alif–Lām–Mīm–Sād	206
10	Alif–Lām–Rāʾ	109
11	Alif–Lām–Rāʾ	123
12	Alif–Lām–Rāʾ	111
13	Alif–Lām–Mīm–Rāʾ	43
14	Alif–Lām–Rāʾ	52
15	Alif–Lām–Rāʾ	99
19	Kāf–Hāʾ–Yāʾ–ʿAin–Sād	98
20	Ṭāʾ–Hāʾ	135
26	Ṭāʾ–Sīn–Mīm	227
27	Ṭāʾ–Sīn	93
28	Ṭāʾ–Sīn–Mīm	88
29	Alif–Lām–Mīm	69
30	Alif–Lām–Mīm	60
31	Alif–Lām–Mīm	34
32	Alif–Lām–Mīm	30
36	Yāʾ–Sīn	83
38	Sād	88
40	Ḥāʾ–Mīm	85
41	Ḥāʾ–Mīm	54
42	Ḥāʾ–Mīm and ʿAin–Sīn–Qāf	53
43	Ḥāʾ–Mīm	89
44	Ḥāʾ–Mīm	59
45	Ḥāʾ–Mīm	37
46	Ḥāʾ–Mīm	35
50	Qāf	45
68	Nūn	52

Rashad Khalifa wrote in his book, The Computer Speaks: God's Message to the World, that the separated letters of the Quran, or Quranic Initials, held the key to the Quran Code. By analyzing the Quran's 29 initialized Surahs statistically, Khalifa claimed to reveal complex mathematical patterns centered around the number 19.

== Quranic Gematria ==
Each Arabic letter can be assigned a specific numerical value, also called Abjad numerals or gematria:

Alif ا 1
Yā' 10 ي	Ṭā' 9 ط	Ḥā' 8 ح	Zāy 7 ز	Wāw 6 و	Hā' 5 ه	Dāl 4 د	Jīm 3 ج	Bā' 2 ب
Qāf 100 ق	Sād 90 ص	Fā' 80 ف	ʿAin 70 ع	Sīn 60 س	Nūn 50 ن	Mīm 40 م	Lām 30 ل	Kāf 20 ك
Ghain 1000 غ	Zā' 900 ظ	Dād 800 ض	Dhāl 700 ذ	Chā' 600 خ	Thā' 500 ث	Tā' 400 ت	Shīn 300 ش	Rā' 200 ر

This system is the same as Syriac alphabetic numerals.

Abdullah Arik, a Quranistic author, uses this method in his book Beyond Probability: God's Message in Mathematics to analyze the Basmala gematrically. He gives various numerological arguments relying on these values to bolster his arguments.

== Reception in the Western world ==
Khalifa's research received little attention in the Western world. In 1980, Martin Gardner mentioned Khalifa's work in Scientific American. In 1997, after Khalifa's death, Gardner devoted a short article to the subject while a columnist for the Skeptical Inquirer.

== Criticism ==
Common critiques of numerological claims also apply to the Quran Code. Critics often invoke the concept of stochastic processes to explain how seemingly mystical patterns could appear in any large dataset. One such critic was Bilal Philips, who argued that Rashad Khalifa's "miracle 19" theory was a hoax based on falsified data, misinterpretations of the Quran's text, and grammar inconsistencies.

Additionally, since early Quran manuscripts can contain orthographic differences in certain passages, the precise number of letters in those sections can be unclear. For example, since the frequency of the letter Alif is subject to debate, there is not a universally agreed letter count in the Alif initialized Surahs. However, to prove his theory Khalifa chose those versions of the text that included letter frequencies divisible by 19. Additionally, Khalifa claimed that the initial "Nūn" in Surah 68 should be spelled as to include an additional Nūn: "Nūn Wāw Nūn" in place of the orthodox spelling, "Nūn". This allowed Khalifa to claim that there are 133 (19×7) Nūns in Surah 68, instead of 132, which is not a multiple of 19. However, Khalifa's spelling does not appear in any Quranic manuscripts. He also assumed that the correct spelling or reading of the word "basṭatan", which occurs in Surah 7, verse 69, contains the Arabic letter Sīn instead of the letter Suād, which is the conventional spelling. He based this assertion on the Samarkand Codex, a 9th-century Quranic manuscript which includes a spelling with the letter Sīn in place of Suād.

Khalifa also claimed that two verses in the Quran, specifically Surah 9, verses 128 and 129, were humanly added, and should not be included. He supports this claim by the hadith Sahīh al-Bukhārī 7425, according to which Zaid ibn Thābit, tasked by Abu Bakr with compiling the Quran, found only one witness to attest to the validity of verses 9:128–129, Khuzaima al-Ansari. Thus, Khalifa claimed that the Quran has only 6346 verses instead of the traditional count of 6348. The omission of these verses is integral to his theory; if these two verses are taken into account, there are 2699 occurrences of the word "Allah" and 115 occurrences of the word "Rahim", neither of which are multiples of 19.

Furthermore, the version of the Quran code is questioned, as it is only used for certain aspects or Quranic initials. Surahs that are not initiated are not fully examined in this context. Since early Quran manuscripts differ orthographically in certain passages, it makes it difficult to reconstruct an "urtext" – or in another expression a "primordial text" – for the Quran, which in turn is used for letter enumerations as well as gematria.

== See also ==
- Bible code
- Cryptography
- Karamat

== Bibliography ==
- Abdullah Arik (2012), Beyond Probability: God's Message in Mathematics, ICS Press
- Ahmed Deedat (1979), Al-Qur'an: The Ultimate Miracle, Library of Islam
- Edip Yüksel, Nineteen: God's Signature 1
- Edip Yüksel (2012), Running Like Zebras, Brainbow Press, ISBN 978-0982586730
- Rashad Khalifa (1981), The Computer Speaks: God's Message to the World, Renaissance Productions International, ISBN 9780934894388
- Stanley, Matthew (2 August 2016), A Miracle on Trial: A Critical Analysis of the Mathematical Miracle of the Quran, Matthew Stanley, ISBN 978-0-9979040-2-4
- José Argüelles (2002), Time and the Technosphere: The Law of Time in Human Affairs, Inner Traditions/Bear, ISBN 9781591438731
- Philips, Bilal (1987). The Qur'an's Numerical Miracle: Hoax and Heresy (Paperback). Al Furqan Advertising Agency. p. 64.
- Yvonne Haddad-Yazbeck (1994), Muslim Communities in North America, State University of New York Press, pp. 34–36, ISBN 9780791420195
