= Theory of limits in Islam =

Religious law theory

Theory of limits (Arabic: نظرية الحدود, romanized: naẓariyyat al-ḥudūd) is a method of interpreting the legal verses of the Quran developed by the Syrian thinker Muhammad Shahrur (1938–2019). It was first presented in his book Al-Kitāb wa-l-Qurʾān: Qirāʾa Muʿāṣira (1990) and further elaborated in Nahwa Uṣūl Jadīda li-l-Fiqh al-Islāmī (2000). Shahrur may have been influenced by the idea of upper and lower limits of punishment from the Lebanese scholar Abdallah al-Alayli (1914–1996), with whom he was personally acquainted and who had published this idea in his book Ayn al-khatāʾ? (1978, "Where is the mistake").

== Core idea ==
Shahrur argued that many Quranic legal rulings do not prescribe a single fixed rule. Instead, God establishes a lower limit (al-ḥadd al-adnā) and an upper limit (al-ḥadd al-aʿlā). Between these two boundaries lies a space in which human societies may exercise ijtihad according to changing social conditions, provided they do not go below the minimum or above the maximum.

He linked this framework to two Quranic concepts: istiqāma (the fixed, unchanging limits set by God) and ḥanīfiyya (the human capacity for flexibility and adaptation within those limits).

=== 1. Only a lower limit ===
God sets a minimum. You cannot go below it, but you can go higher above it.

Example: The women whom a man is forbidden to marry (Quran 4:22–23). Shahrur treats the women explicitly prohibited in these verses as a minimum limit of prohibition.

=== 2. Only an upper limit ===
God sets a maximum. You cannot go above it, but you can choose a lesser option below it.

Example: The punishment for theft (Quran 5:38). Shahrur understands the cutting off of the hand as the upper limit of punishment. A lesser punishment may therefore be applied, but the upper limit cannot be exceeded.

=== 3. Both a lower and an upper limit ===
God sets both a minimum and a maximum. Human decisions may vary within the range between them.

Example: Inheritance (Quran 4:11–12). Shahrur interprets the Qur'anic inheritance rules as establishing lower and upper limits within which the distribution may vary according to circumstances.

=== 4. Lower and upper limits meet at one point ===
The minimum and maximum are the same. There is therefore only one permissible point, leaving no room for variation.

Example: The punishment for adultery (Quran 24:2). Shahrur understands the prescribed one hundred lashes as both the lower and upper limit, so the punishment cannot be reduced or increased.

=== 5. Both limits exist, but neither may be exceeded ===
God sets both a lower and an upper boundary. Human action may take place between them, but crossing either boundary violates the limit.

Example: Relations between men and women. Shahrur places adultery at the upper limit. Conduct between men and women that does not constitute adultery remains within the space between the limits.

=== 6. A positive upper limit and a negative lower limit ===
God sets a positive upper limit and a negative lower limit. Human activity may move between the two, while the positive upper limit cannot be exceeded.

Example: Material relations between people. Shahrur places riba at the positive upper limit and zakat at the negative lower limit. Zakat may be exceeded through voluntary charity, while the upper limit represented by riba cannot be exceeded.

== Applications in family law ==
In inheritance, Shahrur treated the classic 2:1 ratio as movable boundaries rather than a rigid formula. The share of women may increase toward equality when economic and social realities justify it, provided women do not receive less than the Quranic minimum.

In polygamy (Quran 4:3), he combined a quantitative upper limit (maximum of four wives) with a qualitative condition: the additional wives should be widows responsible for orphaned children. The purpose, in his reading, is social protection rather than personal desire.

== Reception ==
The theory has been widely discussed in contemporary Islamic legal studies. Supporters view it as a method that preserves the authority of the Quran while allowing legal practice to respond to modern conditions. Critics argue that it departs from classical principles of uṣūl al-fiqh, minimises the role of Hadith, and stretches the linguistic meaning of the text beyond acceptable limits.

== See also ==
- Muhammad Shahrur
- Quranism
- Ijtihad
- Islamic modernism
