= 1999 Nigerian Senate elections in Bauchi State =

The 1999 Nigerian Senate election in Bauchi State was held on February 20, 1999, to elect members of the Nigerian Senate to represent Bauchi State. Bashir Mustapha representing Bauchi North, Idi Othman Guda representing Bauchi Central and Salisu Matori representing Bauchi South all won on the platform of the Peoples Democratic Party.

== Overview ==
Affiliation	Party		Total
Affiliation	PDP	AD	Total
Before Election			3
After Election	3	0	3

== Summary ==
District	Incumbent	Party	Elected Senator	Party
Bauchi North			Bashir Mustapha	PDP
Bauchi Central			Idi Othman Guda	PDP
Bauchi South			Salisu Matori	PDP

== Results ==
=== Bauchi North ===
The election was won by Bashir Mustapha of the Peoples Democratic Party.

2003 Nigerian Senate election in Bauchi State
Party	Candidate	Votes	%
PDP	Bashir Mustapha		
Total votes			
PDP hold			

=== Bauchi Central ===
The election was won by Idi Othman Guda of the Peoples Democratic Party.

2003 Nigerian Senate election in Bauchi State
Party	Candidate	Votes	%
PDP	Idi Othman Guda		
Total votes			
PDP hold			

=== Bauchi South ===
The election was won by Salisu Matori of the Peoples Democratic Party.

2003 Nigerian Senate election in Bauchi State
Party	Candidate	Votes	%
PDP	Salisu Matori		
Total votes			
PDP hold			
