= Epe Central Mosque =

Mosque in Epe, Lagos, Nigeria

Coordinates: 6°35′13″N 3°58′57″E

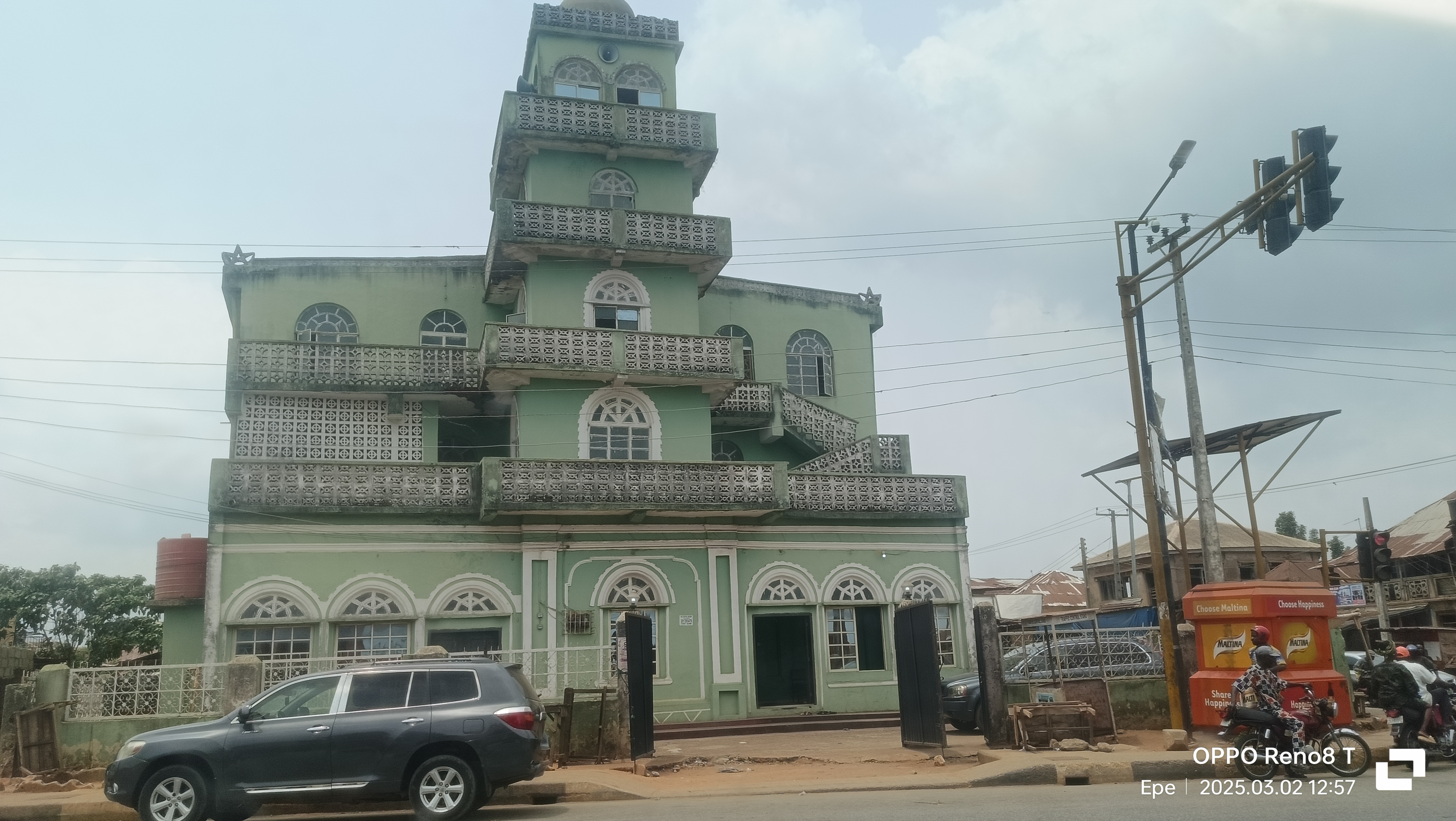
Epe Central Mosque, Ita-Opo

First Epe Central Mosque is a historic mosque located in Epe, Lagos State, Nigeria built in 1862. It is regarded as one of the earliest surviving Islamic landmarks in Lagos and reflects the growth of Islam in the town during the nineteenth century.

== History ==
Islam was introduced to Epe following the arrival of the exiled Lagos ruler Kosoko and his followers in 1852. Prior to this period, the inhabitants of Epe largely practised traditional Yoruba religion. The spread of Islam in the community was aided by members of Kosoko's entourage, including Muhammad Audu, a Hausa Muslim from Katsina, who is credited with being the first person to call Muslims to prayer in Epe.

According to historical accounts, one of Kosoko's chiefs, Balogun Ajeniya, donated land for the construction of an early mosque near his residence. This mosque, known as Atirin Mosque, served as an important centre for Islamic worship and learning in the community.

A commemorative plaque on the First Epe Central Mosque states that the mosque was built in 1862 and rebuilt in 1930. The structure was later renovated and upgraded to a modern facility. Following these improvements, it was recommissioned on 2 July 2006 by Oba M. A. Balogun Agbaje, Arojoyoye III, the Olu-Epe of Epe Kingdom.

== Significance ==
The First Epe Central Mosque is considered an important symbol of the introduction and development of Islam in Epe and Lagos State, and the mosque architecture signifies a cross-fertilization of Luso-Brazilian design elements blended with traditional West African Islamic architecture. As one of the oldest mosques in Lagos State, it represents a significant aspect of the religious and cultural heritage of the Epe community.

== See also ==
- Epe
- Lagos State
- Islam in Nigeria
