= Quranism =

Islamic view holding the Quran as the sole source of faith

Quranism (Arabic: القرآنية, romanized: al-Qurʾāniyya) is an Islamic denomination that generally rejects the authoritative role of Hadiths, and considers the Qur'an to be the only dependable religious text. Quranist Muslims believe that the Qur'an is clear and complete and can be fully understood without recourse to external sources.

Quranists are often divided into two main branches: those who believe the Qur'an is the primary source and consider external sources such as the Hadiths and Sunnah as secondary and dependent, and those who accept no texts other than the Qur'an and disregard tradition altogether. The extent to which Quranists reject the authenticity of the Sunnah varies, though the most established groups of Quranism have thoroughly criticised the Hadith, the most prevalent being the Quranist claim that the Hadith is not mentioned in the Qur'an as a source of Islamic theology or practice, was not recorded in written form until two centuries after the death of the Islamic prophet Muhammad, contains perceived errors and contradictions, and promotes sectarianism, anti-science, anti-reason, and misogyny. Quranists also believe that previous revelations of God have been altered, and that the Qur'an is the only book of God that has valid divine significance.

As they believe that Hadith, while not being reliable sources of religion, can serve as historical records, Quranists cite some early Islamic writings in support of their positions, including those attributed to Muhammad, caliph Umar (r. 634–644) and materials dating to the Umayyad and Abbasid caliphates. Modern scholarship holds that controversy over the sufficiency of the Qur'an as the only source of Islamic law and doctrine dates back to the early centuries of Islam, where some scholars introduced followers of the Qur'an alone as Mu'tazilites or sects of the Kharijites, such as the Haruri and the Azariqa. Though the Qur'an-only view waned during the classical Islamic period, it re-emerged and thrived with the modernist thinkers of the 19th century in Egypt and the Indian subcontinent. Quranism has since taken on political, reformist, fundamentalist, and militant dimensions in various countries.

In matters of faith, jurisprudence, and legislation, Quranists differ from Ahl al-Hadith, who consider the Hadith (Kutub al-Sittah) in addition to the Quran. Unlike the Sunni and Shia sects, the Quranist view argues that Islam can be practised without the Hadith. Whereas Hadith-followers believe that obedience to Muhammad entails obedience to Hadiths, Quranists believe that obedience to Muhammad means obedience to the Qur'an. In addition, several extra-Quranic traditions upheld by Sunnis, such as kissing the Black Stone, the symbolic Stoning of the Devil, and the Tashahhud during the Ṣalāh, are regarded as idolatry (shirk) or possible idolatry by Quranists. This methodological difference has led to considerable divergence between Quranists and both Sunnis and Shias in matters of theology and law as well as the understanding of the Qur'an. Despite this, aspects of Quranism have been adopted by non-Quranists, such as some Shia reformist scholars.

== Terminology ==
"Quranists" (Arabic: القرآنية, romanized: al-Qurʾāniyya) are also referred to as "reformists" or "Quraniyun" (those who ascribe to the Qur'an alone).

== Doctrine ==
Quranists believe that the Qur'an is clear, complete, and that it can be fully understood without recourse to the Hadith and Sunnah. Therefore, they use the Qur'an itself to interpret the Qur'an:

[A] literal and holistic analysis of the text from a contemporary perspective and applying the exegetical principle of tafsir al-qur'an bi al-qur'an (explaining the Qur'an with the Qur'an) and the jurisprudential principle al-asl fi al-kalam al-haqiqah (the fundamental rule of speech is literalness), without refracting that Qur'anic usage through the lens of history and tradition.

This methodology differs from Tafsir bi'r-Riwāyah, which is the method of commenting on the Qur'an using traditional sources, and Tafsir al-Qur'an bi-l-Kitab, which refers to interpreting the Qur'an with/through the Bible, generally referred to in Quranic studies as the Tawrat and the ʾInjīl.

In the centuries following Muhammad's death, Quranists did not believe in naskh. The Kufan scholar Dirar ibn Amr's Quranist belief led him to deny in the Dajjal, Punishment of the Grave, and Shafa'a in the 8th century. The Egyptian scholar Mohammed Abu Zaid al-Damanhury's Quranist commentaries led him to reject the belief in the ’Isrā’ and Miʿrāj in the early 20th century. In his rationalist Qur'an commentary published in 1930, which uses the Qur'an itself to interpret the Qur'an, he claimed that verse 17:1 was an allusion to the Hijrah and not ’Isrā’ and Miʿrāj.

Syed Ahmad Khan argued that, while the Qur'an remained socially relevant, reliance on Hadith limits the vast potential of the Qur'an to a particular cultural and historical situation.

The extent to which Quranists reject the authority of Hadith and Sunnah varies, but the more established groups have thoroughly criticised the authority of Hadith and reject it for many reasons. The most common being the Quranists who say that Hadith is not mentioned in the Qur'an as a source of Islamic theology and practice, was not recorded in written form until a century after the death of Muhammad, and contain internal errors and contradictions as well as contradictions with the Quran. For Sunni Muslims, the Sunnah, i.e the Sunnah (the way) of the Prophet, is one of the two primary sources of Islamic law, and while the Qur'an has verses enjoining Muslims to obey the Messenger, the Qur'an never talks about Sunnah in connection with Muhammad or other prophets. The term Sunnah appears several times, including in the phrase sunnah Allah (way of God), but not sunnah an-Nabi (way of the Prophet) – the phrase customarily used by proponents of Hadith.

The concept of taḥrīf has also been advocated by Quranists such as Rashad Khalifa, who believed that previous revelations of God, such as the Bible, contained contradictions due to human interference. Instead, he believed that the beliefs and practices of Islam should be based on the Qur'an alone. Another Quranist who believes the Bible contains contradictions is Edip Yüksel.

=== Differences with mainstream Islam ===
Quranists believe that the Qur'an is the sole source of religious law and guidance in Islam and reject the authority of sources outside of the Qur'an like Hadith and Sunnah. Quranists suggest that vast majority of Hadith literature are forged and that the Qur'an criticises the Hadith both in technical sense and general sense. Quranists claim that the Sunnis and Shias have distorted the meaning of the verses to support their agenda, especially in verses about women and war. Due to these differences in theology, there are differences between traditional Islamic and Quranist practices.

Several extra-Quranic traditions upheld by Sunnis, such as kissing the Black Stone, the symbolic Stoning of the Devil, and the Tashahhud during the Ṣalāh, are regarded as idolatry (shirk) or possible idolatry by Quranists.

==== Shahada (creed) ====
The Shahada accepted by a number of Quranists is la ilaha illa'llah ("There is nothing worthy of worship except God").

==== Ṣalāh (prayer) ====
Quranists pray three times a day; they do not recognise the Hadiths that specify five prayers per day. The practice of praying five times daily does not appear in the Quran, but the practice originated in Hadiths about Muhammad's ’Isrā’ and Miʿrāj.

The blessings for Muhammad and Abraham, which are part of the traditional ritual, are not practiced by most Quranists in the call to prayer and in the prayer itself, arguing that the Qur'an mentions prayers are only for God, and the Qur'an tells believers to make no distinction between Messengers of God.

There are other minor differences: for Quranists, menstruation does not constitute an obstacle to prayer, men and women are allowed to pray together in a mosque and that there is no catching up later once a prayer is missed.

==== Wuḍūʼ (ablution) ====
Quranist ablution before prayer only includes washing the face, hands up to the elbows and stroking the head and feet, since only these steps are mentioned in the Qur'an 5:6.

==== Zakāh (alms tax) ====
In traditional Islam, giving Zakāh is a religious duty and amounts to 2.5 percent of the annual income. The Quranists give Zakāh based on the Quranic verses. In the opinion of many Quranists, Zakāh must be paid, but the Qur'an does not specify a percentage because it does not appear explicitly in the Qur'an. Other Quranists are in agreement with the 2.5 percent, but do not give the Zakāh annually, but from all money they earn.

==== Ṣawm (fasting) ====
The majority of Quranists fast for all of Ramadan, but do not see the last day of Ramadan as a holy day.

==== Ḥajj (pilgrimage) ====
Extra-Quranic traditions in the Ḥajj, such as kissing or hugging the Black Stone and the symbolic Stoning of the Devil are rejected and seen as shirk by Quranists.

==== Ridda (apostasy) ====
The Quranic verse "there shall be no compulsion/pressure in religion" is taken into account and everyone is allowed to freely decide on their religion.

==== Polygamy ====
Some Quranist movements allow polygamy only on the condition of the adoption of orphans who have mothers and do not want to lose them, as the Quranic verse 4:3 set the condition after the Battle of Uhud where many of the male companions martyred; but other Quranist movements argue that although it is not explicitly banned, polygamy is a thing of the past because the regulations which are contained in the Qur'an are very strict and they have been fulfilled by almost nobody on Earth, therefore polygamy cannot be practiced anymore. In the extremely rare case in which it may be practiced, there is a strict limit on the number of wives, which is four.

==== Military Jihad ====
Most Quranist movements interpret the "holy war" as a solely defensive war, because according to them that is the only type of war allowed in the Quran. A war is only holy when Muslims are threatened on their own lands. Therefore, unlike the Jihadis, for the Quranists "holy war" does not refer to an offensive war against non-Muslim countries or communities in any circumstances.

==== Food ====
Quranists can eat food which is prepared by Christians and Jews as stated in the Qur'an, but some Quranists believe that animals which are raised by Christians and Jews should still be blessed before they are eaten. According to Quranists, the Qur'an forbids the inflicting of pain on the animal during its slaughter, thus for them, the techniques of slaughtering animals in the Western world are illegitimate. Unlike Sunnis, Quranists can eat food with both of their hands, even with their left hands because the Qur'an does not forbid it.

==== Dress code ====
Clothing does not play a key role in Quranism. All Quranist movements agree that Islam has no sets of traditional clothing, except for the rules described in the Qur'an. Therefore, beards and the Ḥijāb are not necessary.

==== Hadith ====
Quranists reject Hadiths altogether. Some Quranists believe that Hadiths – while not being reliable sources of religion – can be used as a reference to get an idea on historical events. They argue that there is no harm in using Hadiths to get a common idea on the history as long as they are not taken as historical facts. According to them, a Hadith narration about history can be true or can be false, but a Hadith narration adding rulings to religion is always false.

==== Tafsīr ====
Although there are Quranist Tafsīr works, for the most part Quranists do not think that it is needed. They believe the Qur'an does not give anyone the authority to interpret because, as stated in Qur'an, Allah sends guidance individually.

==== Other ====
The following aspects can be cited as further examples which, compared to traditional Islam, are rejected by Quranists or regarded as irrelevant:

- Quranists see circumcision as irrelevant; circumcision is not mentioned in the Qur'an.
- Quranists see Eid al-Fitr (festival of breaking the fast) and Eid al-Adha (Islamic festival of sacrifice) as merely cultural holidays, not holy.
- Quranists do not consider the headscarf for women to be obligatory.
- Quranists believe cremation is permissible in Islam as there is no prohibition in the Qur'an against cremation, and that burial is not the only Islamic method that is approved by God.
- Quranists are strictly against torture.
- Quranists are strictly against stoning of adulterers or homosexuals because stoning is not mentioned in the Qur'an.
- Quranists reject the prohibition of music and the drawing of creatures or making statues of them, including drawings of the prophets.
- Quranists are against the prohibition for a man to wear gold or silk, to shave his beard, etc.
- Quranists do not consider dogs unclean or to be avoided.
- Quranists do not believe in the Mahdī or the Dajjal, as they are not mentioned in the Qur'an.

== History ==
=== Early Islam ===
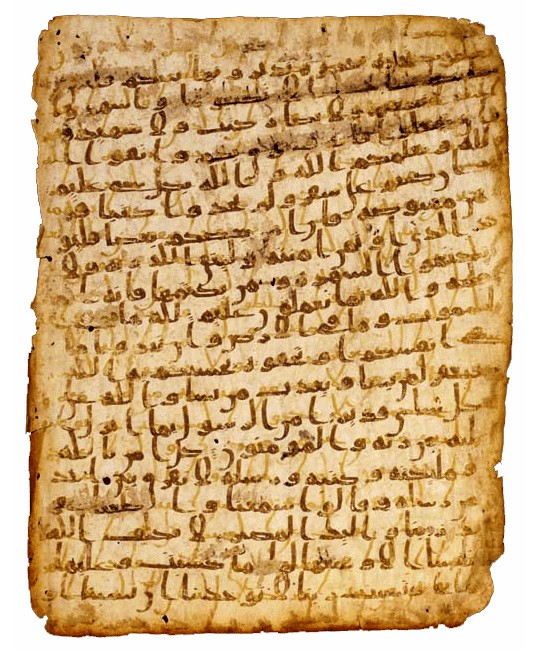
Sura al-Baqarah, verses 282–286, from an early Quranic manuscript written on vellum (mid-late 7th century)

Quranists date their beliefs back to the time of Muhammad, who they claim prohibited the writing of Hadiths. As they believe that Hadith, while not being reliable sources of religion, can be used as a reference to get an idea on historical events, they point out several narrations about early Islam to support their beliefs. According to one of these narrations, Muhammad's companion and the second caliph ʿUmar (r. 634–644) also prohibited the writing of Hadith and destroyed existing collections during his reign. Similar reports claim when Umar appointed a governor to Kufa, he told him: "You will be coming to the people of a town for whom the buzzing of the Qur'an is as the buzzing of bees. Therefore, do not distract them with the Hadith, and thus engage them. Bare the Qur'an and spare the Hadith from God's Messenger!"

=== The Kharijite rejection of Hadiths ===
A categorical rejection of Hadiths, as can be found today among the Quranists, is already known in the early days of Islam by the Kharijites. For example, Abū l-Qāsim al-Balkhī (d. 931) in his Kitāb al-Maqālāt speaks of the Kharijites as "those who declare the tradition completely null and void and claim that one only needs to know what the Book literally speaks of" (allaḏīna yufsidūna n-naql kullahu wa-yazʿumūna annahu lā yajibu l-ʿilm illā bimā naṭaqa bihi al-kitāb naṣṣan). The Muʿtazilite thinker Dirār ibn ʿAmr (d. ca. 815) reports that, according to the teachings of the two Kharijite sects the Azraqites and Bazīghites, "knowledge of religion can only be acquired from the Qur'an and they rejected the Ijmāʿ and the traditions" (ʿilm al-dīn innamā yudraku min qibal al-Qurʾān faqaṭ wa-ankarū al-ijmāʿ wa-l-aḫbār kullahā). A letter that the early Khārijī ʿAbdallāh ibn Ibād is said to have sent to the Umayyad caliph ʿAbd al-Malik ibn Marwān in the year 76 of the Hijra (695) rejects Hadiths as the basis for the imposition of duties and prohibitions and admonishes people to adhere only to the Qur'an. The Bidʿīya, a subgroup of the Azraqites, is said to have recognised only two daily obligatory prayers with reference to Sura 11:114.

Some of the Kharijites rejected the punishment of adultery with stoning. Although the Qur'an does not prescribe this penalty, Sunnis hold that such a verse existed in the Qur'an, which was then abrogated. A Hadith is ascribed to Umar, asserting the existence of this verse in the Qur'an. These Kharijites rejected the authenticity of such a verse. The Islamic scholar Abū al-Ḥasan al-Ashʿarī attributed this position to the Kharijite sect, the Azariqa, who held a strict scripturalist position in legal matters (i.e. following only the Qur'an and rejecting commonly held views if they had no Quranic basis), and thus also refused to enforce legal punishment on slanderers when the slander was targeted at a male.

Muhammad ibn Idrīs ash-Shafiʿī (d. 820) also reports in his tractate Jimāʿ al-ʿIlm of a group of scholars who completely rejected the authority of the Hadiths. He summarises their reasoning as follows: The Qur'anic text in Sura 16:89, which states that the Qur'an is a "clarification for every thing" (tibyān li-kull shaiʾ), shows that the Qur'an contains all the necessary information for the derivation of legal rules; therefore, there is no need for Hadith reports to interpret the normative content of Qur'anic verses. Since the Qur'an does not specify a specific number or time for ritual prayer, nor a specific amount for Zakah, a person fulfills his duties if he prays only once a day or every few days, or gives the smallest amount that can be considered alms. At no point in his text does ash-Shafiʿī mention the names of individual persons or the school of thought that held these positions. Joseph Schacht was of the opinion that this group were Muʿtazilites. On the other hand, due to the similarity of these teachings to what is reported about the Kharijites, Hüseyin Hansu suspects that the group of scholars described by ash-Shafiʿī consisted of Kharijites.

Although there were also various critical positions among the Muʿtazilites regarding Hadiths, they did not completely reject extra-Qur'anic prophetic authority, but demanded that only what could be known with certainty could serve as the basis for Islamic legal norms. They therefore did not accept isolated Hadiths, but only those that were so widely accepted that their untruthfulness seemed unthinkable. After the 9th century, however, the Muʿtazilites abandoned this strict position and swung to the line of ash-Shafiʿī by accepting Hadiths handed down only by individuals as sources of certainty.

=== Umayyad period ===
The centrality of the Qur'an in the religious life of the Kufans that Umar described was quickly changing, however. A few decades later, a letter was sent to the Umayyad caliph ʿAbd al-Malik ibn Marwān (r. 685–705) regarding the Kufans: "They abandoned the judgement of their Lord and took Hadiths for their religion; and they claim that they have obtained knowledge other than from the Qur'an... They believed in a book which was not from God, written by the hands of men; they then attributed it to the Messenger of God."

In the following years, the taboo against the writing and following of hadiths had receded to such an extent that the eighth Umayyad caliph ʿUmar ibn ʿAbd al-ʿAzīz (r. 717–720) ordered the first official collection of Hadith. ʾAbū Bakr ibn Muhammad ibn ʿAmr ibn Ḥazm and ʾAbū Bakr Muḥammad az-Zuhrī, were among those who wrote Hadiths at ʿUmar ibn ʿAbd al-ʿAzīz's behest.

=== Abbasid period ===
Despite the trend towards Hadiths, the questioning of their authority continued during the Abbasid period and existed during the time of ash-Shafiʿī, when a group known as Ahl al-Kalam argued that the prophetic example of Muhammad "is found in following the Qur'an alone", rather than Hadith. The majority of Hadiths, according to them, was mere guesswork, conjecture, and bid'a, while the Book of God was complete and perfect, and did not require the Hadith to supplement or complement it. There were prominent scholars who rejected traditional Hadiths like Dirar ibn Amr. He wrote a book titled The Contradiction Within Hadith. However, the tide had changed from the earlier centuries to such an extent that Dirar was beaten up and had to remain in hiding until his death. Like Dirar ibn Amr, the scholar ʾAbū Bakr al-Aṣamm also had little use for Hadiths.

Under the Abbasid caliph al-Maʾmūn (r. 813–833), the adherents of Kalam were favoured and the supporters of Hadiths were dealt harshly. Al-Maʾmūn was inclined towards rational inquiry in religious matters, supported the proponents of Kalam and persecuted the adherents of Hadiths. His two immediate successors, al-Muʿtaṣim (r. 833–842) and al-Wāthiq (r. 842–847), followed his policies. Unlike his three predecessors, al-Mutawakkil (r. 847–861) was not inclined to rational inquiry in religious matters, and strove to bolster the Hadiths as a necessary source of the Sunnah.

=== The emergence of Quranism in modern India and Egypt ===
In the 18th and 19th centuries, Muslim reform thinkers began to deal again with the authority of Islamic sources of law, rejected the taqlīd and demanded a return to the Qur'an and the Sunnah. In addition, there was the confrontation with the superiority of the Western great powers. Muslim scholars now had to deal with new questions and problems that arose from the influence of Western ideas, which were spread by missionaries and Orientalists, among others. They also tried to find an explanation for the backwardness of Muslims compared to the progress made in Western countries. In order to provide an answer to these questions, to defend Islam against accusations, and to interpret it in such a way that it is compatible with rational and scientific ideas, some modernist scholars have sought to separate the foundations of religion from historical influences and tradition. To this end, they critically examined the four traditional sources of Islamic law (Qur'an, Sunnah, Ijmāʿ, Qiyās).

In this context, especially in British India at the time, a number of thinkers and scholars emerged who rejected Hadiths and wanted to establish the Qur'an as the main source. Syed Ahmad Khan (d. 1898), founder of the Aligarh Movement, argued that the Qur'an is the only authoritative source of Islam. The Hadith corpus is unreliable, since in traditional Hadith criticism only the trustworthiness of the narrators was used as evidence for the authenticity of the Hadiths. However, one should also critically analyse the Hadith text (matn) and check its compatibility with the Qur'an and reason. On the basis of this foundation, some theological dogmas and legal regulations would have to be rationally justified and interpreted according to criteria of reason, independent of tradition. Another important point in Syed Ahmad Khan's thinking was his definition of nature. He equated the laws of nature, the "Work of God," with revelation, the "Word of God." Among other things, this led to him being dismissed by other scholars as a "naturalist" (Naychirī) and his ideas were criticised by numerous contemporary scholars.

Chiragh Ali (d. 1895) further developed the ideas of Syed Ahmad Khan and took a stricter view of the use of Hadiths as an authoritative source. He also criticised the focus of Muslim scholars on the criticism of isnād and pointed that the Hadiths were not collected until decades after the death of the Prophet Muhammad, and concluded that almost all Hadiths were inauthentic. This assumption made it possible for him to invalidate and reform all regulations and institutions based on the Hadiths. Ali's starting point, however, was not the criticism of the Hadith per se, but the defense of the feasibility of Islam in the modern age and the search for the "True Islam" far from the ideas of traditional Muslims and the accusations of Western Orientalists.

At the same time as Syed Ahmad Khan, Muhammad ʿAbduh (d. 1905) began to cautiously criticise Hadiths in Egypt. He considered only mutawātir Hadiths to be ultimately binding, i.e. those handed down by a large number of people. However, aḥād Hadiths, i.e. those that have been handed down by only one person, are only to be followed if they convince the reader. In doing so, he opened the door to a personal assessment of the binding nature of the Hadiths without rejecting them as a whole. His focus was on rejecting the imitation of earlier schools of law and scholars, which in his opinion had contributed greatly to the retrogression of Muslims in his country.

In 1906, the Egyptian physician Muhammad Tawfiq Sidqi (d. 1920) published an article entitled "Islam is the Qur'an Alone" (Al-Islām huwa l-Qurʾān Waḥda-hū) in Rashīd Rida's magazine Al-Manār. As the name of the article suggests, Sidqi accepted the Qur'an alone as an authoritative religious source and was convinced that it contained all the necessary information. The Sunnah of the Prophet was only a model for his contemporaries. If the Prophet had wanted Hadiths to reach future generations, he would have had them written down – just like the Qur'an. Muslims today are therefore free to decide whether or not to follow something that is narrated by the Prophet and is not contained in the Qur'an. Sidqi's article drew a long discussion and several refutations, which were published in the journal along with his response.

What is obligatory for man does not go beyond God's Book. If anything other than the Qur'an had been necessary for religion, the Prophet would have commanded its registration in writing, and God would have guaranteed its preservation.

— Muhammad Tawfiq Sidqi

=== Quranic thinkers in India from Chakralawi to Ghulam Ahmed Perwez ===
At the beginning of the 20th century, Abdullah Chakralawi (d. 1916) founded the community of the Ahl aḏ-Ḏhikr wa-l-Qurʾān (Ahl al-Qurʾān for short) in Lahore. He was convinced that the Qur'an was so comprehensive that it was sufficient as a divine source for the guidance of Muslims, and therefore the rest of the written tradition, including the Hadiths and earlier Quranic commentaries, could be excluded. Thus, Chakralawi and his followers, in contrast to their predecessors, rejected the Hadiths as a whole recognising only the Qur'an as an authoritative and valid source on theological and ritual issues, and breaking away from classical exegetical methods. Between 1903 and 1932, they also published the journal Ishāʿat al-Qurʾān.

A few years after Chakralawi's death, Khwaja Ahmad ad-Din Amritsari (d. 1936) founded another Quranist movement in Amritsar, the Anjuman-i Ummat-i Muslimah, with the magazines al-Balāḡ and al-Bayān. The return to the Qur'an as the only authoritative source, in his opinion, should cleanse Islam of previous theological conclusions and jurisprudences, as well as of Arab-dominated thinking, thus making it a universal faith that can create harmony between the different religions.

The historian and Islamic scholar Aslam Jairajpuri (d. 1955) developed a Quranic history of the Hadith and saw the Hadiths not as a religiously binding, but very important historical source. With regard to ritual questions, he considered the actions of the Prophet (Sunnah al-Mutawātir), which had been handed down over many strands, to be trustworthy.

His student Ghulam Ahmed Perwez (d. 1985) became one of the most influential and productive personalities of the Quranist movement. In 1938, he founded the organisation Tolu-e-Islam in Delhi, which was later relocated to Lahore and published the journal Tolu-e-Islam, which had previously been edited by Syed Nazeer Niazi. Like his teacher, Perwez regarded the Hadiths as a purely historical source and attributed authority to the Prophet's interpretation mainly in his time. However, the Hadiths would have to be compared with the Qur'an, selected and thus cleansed. Similar to Amritsari, he ascribed to Islam a universal character, which could be achieved on the basis of the Qur'an. As far as the details of interpretation and implementation are concerned, these would have to be determined by a central Muslim authority – also in the form of a state – in a contemporary manner. In this context, Perwez also developed a theory of the state and later supported the partition of India and the founding of Pakistan. In particular, his views on Hadiths brought him much criticism. It even got to the point that 1000 traditionalist scholars declared him an infidel in a Takfīr-Fatwa. However, the movement he founded is still active today and has followers in Pakistan and Europe, among other places.

=== Quranism in modern Iran ===
Like some of their counterparts in Egypt such as Muhammad Tawfiq Sidqi and Mohammed Abu Zaid al-Damanhury, some reformist scholars in Iran who adopted Quranist beliefs came from institutions of higher learning. Shaykh Hadi Najmabadi, Mirza Rida Quli Shari'at-Sanglaji, Mohammad Sadeqi Tehrani, and Sayyid Abu al-Fadl Burqaʻi were educated in traditional Shia universities in Najaf and Qom. However, they believed that some beliefs and practices that were taught in these universities, such as the veneration of Imamzadeh and a belief in Raj'a, were irrational and superstitious and had no basis in the Qur'an. And rather than interpreting the Qur'an through the lens of Hadith, they interpreted the Qur'an with the Qur'an (Tafsīr al-Qur’an bil-Qur’an). These reformist beliefs provoked criticism from traditional Shia scholars like Ayatollah Khomeini, who attempted to refute the criticisms made by Sanglaji and other reformists in his book Kashf al-Asrar. Qur'an-centered beliefs have also spread among Muslims like Ali Behzadnia, who became Deputy Minister of Health and Welfare and Acting Minister of Education shortly after the Iranian Revolution. He has criticised the government in Iran for being undemocratic and totally alien to the "Islam of the Quran".. In Pakistan There Are many Shias Calls themselves As Ahle Quran Shia but However, they are closer to the Ideology of Zaydis.

=== The Yan Tatsine movement in Nigeria ===
A new current with a Quranist orientation emerged in the 1960s with the Yan Tatsine movement in Nigeria under Mohammed Marwa, better known by his nickname Maitatsine (d. 1980), which later led to an armed uprising. Muhammad Marwa came from Maroua in northern Cameroon and came to Kano in 1945. In the early 1960s, he began preaching a particular form of Quranic exegesis that was radically different from the commonly used Sunni Quranic commentaries in Kano and Northeastern Nigeria. Marwa rejected all Western inventions such as wristwatches, bicycles, cars and televisions. He also rejected the teachings of the Prophet Muhammad and recognised only the Qur'an as an authoritative religious source. Marwa and his followers derived their specific prohibitions directly from the Qur'an, excluding traditional literature and using the Hausa language. Those who did not obey these precepts were labeled as polytheists. In December 1980, they finally stormed the Friday Mosque of Kano. The uprising was crushed by the Nigerian Army. Several thousand people died in the fighting, including Marwa himself. However, the movement lived on and led to uprisings in other parts of northern Nigeria for some time.

=== Libya under Gaddafi ===
The military coup in Libya in 1969 brought Muammar Gaddafi (d. 2011) to power, who initially gave the country a pan-Arabist, socialist and later increasingly clear Islamic orientation. Gaddafi ascribed a universal claim to Islam and called for a return to the "essence of Islam" and its fundamental source, the Qur'an, which was interpreted in a progressive way. In the Declaration on the Authority of the People of 1977 the Qur'an was declared the "constitution" of the People's Republic of Libya. Gaddafi asserted the Qur'an as the sole guide to Islamic governance and the unimpeded ability of every Muslim to read and interpret it. The Islamic tradition, including the Hadiths, the schools of law and jurisprudence of earlier scholars, was rejected by Gaddafi, on the grounds that it distracted Muslims from the "primordial source of divine truth". In contrast, the religious acts of the Prophet Muhammad such as ritual prayer were recognised as Sunnah In 1978, the year zero of the Islamic calendar was also changed from the Hijrah to the anniversary of the Prophet's death. Gaddafi was also critical of the various schools of jurisprudence, such as the Hanafi, Maliki, and Hanbali, charging that they are the product of a struggle for political power and unconnected with either Islam or the Qur'an.

=== Rashad Khalifa and his international impact ===
In the United States, the Egyptian Rashad Khalifa developed a new theological doctrine at the end of the 20th century, which had an influence on Quranists in many other countries. With the help of computers, he carried out a numerical analysis of the Qur'an, which was supposed to prove unequivocally that it was of divine origin. The fundamental role was played by the number 19, which is mentioned in a verse and which Khalifa sought to find everywhere in the structure of the Qura'an as the "Qur'an code" or "Code 19". This "scientific" approach was initially welcomed by many Muslims. However, Khalifa's subsequent conclusions led to strong criticism from Muslims and scholars around the world. Khalifa claimed that the Sunnah and the Hadith were pure speculation and satanic traps for the people, and their observance was tantamount to associating partners with God (shirk). He also excluded two verses from the Qur'an (Q 9:128–129) as "satanic" because they were incompatible with his theory based on the number 19. Rashad Khalifa also founded an organisation called United Submitters International, which published a monthly newsletter entitled Submitter's Perspective from 1985 onwards. Like Muhammad Marwa before him, Rashad Khalifa declared himself God's Messenger of the Covenant in 1989, causing a great stir and outrage.

With his teachings, Rashad Khalifa developed a strong international reputation as early as the 1980s. It is worth mentioning, for example, the Egyptian activist Ahmad Subhy Mansour, who was relieved of his professorship of Islamic history at Al-Azhar University in 1985 because of his Quranist ideas and imprisoned two years later. In January 1988, he traveled to the United States and joined Rashad Khalifa, but soon left his circle. In 2002, he was granted asylum in the United States and founded the "International Quranic Center" there, which is mainly active online. In addition to a return to the Qur'an alone, the goals of the organisation include the promotion of democracy and human rights.

The circle of Quranists around Rashad Khalifa also includes Edip Yüksel, a Kurdish activist from Turkey who initially campaigned for an Islamic revolution in Turkey, which is why he was imprisoned. Through the works of Rashad Khalifa, he became acquainted with the ideas of Quranism and began to propagate them. In 1989, he had to leave the country and joined the Submitters in Tucson, but left them some time later. Yüksel and two other authors produced their own translation of the Qur'an and disseminated their own and Khalifa's ideas in numerous Turkish and English books as well as online – above all the doctrine of the number 19. In some respects, however, his views differ from those of the Submitters. In his opinion, for example, one only has to pray three times a day, because only three prayer times are mentioned in the Qur'an, and there are no fixed dress codes during prayer.

Rashad Khalifa himself was murdered in 1990 in the Tucson Mosque, where he had previously worked as an Imam for eleven years. However, the organisation he founded, called United Submitters International, continues to exist. Followers, albeit few in number, can also be found in other regions of America and Canada and are mainly active online. They see themselves as a "moderate reformist religious community" and are not associated with other Muslim communities, as they believe that they do not really follow the Qur'an. The Submitters practice the Five Pillars of Islam with deviations from the practice of the majority of Muslims, which in their opinion is not found in the Qur'an. The women do not wear headscarves and take an active part in community life.

Rashad Khalifa also had some long-distance effect with his teachings. In Malaysia, for example, under his influence, Kassim Ahmad (d. 2017) wrote the book Hadith: A Re-evaluation in 1997, in which he called for a scientific evaluation of Hadiths and the entire Islamic tradition, as they were responsible for the retrogression of Muslims. He saw the Qur'an as the only Sunnah of the Prophet Muhammad and criticised the classical Sunni view of the Sunnah and Hadiths since ash-Shafiʿī. Although his ideas are largely in line with those of Rashad Khalifa, Ahmad uses a milder tone, calling on people to think rationally and for social reform at the same time. His book was banned in Malaysia and Ahmad was declared a heretic.

The South African preacher Ahmed Deedat also contributed to the dissemination of Khalifa's ideas with his book Al-Qurʾān – The Ultimate Miracle, which was strongly based on Khalifa's early writings. This book fell on particularly fertile ground with the former followers of the Maitatsine movement in Kano. There, in the late 1990s, Quranist movement formed among well-off civil servants and freelancers who called themselves Qurʾānawa. They accept the prophethood of Muhammad, but reject Hadiths. They do not see Rashad Khalifa as a prophet or a messenger of God, but they adhere to his teachings. To spread their teachings of the "mathematical miracle of the Qur'an" and the lack of authenticity of Hadiths, they rely heavily on the Internet. From Kano, the Quranist movement has also spread to other cities in northern Nigeria. Well-known Quranists who have been influenced by the teachings of Rashad include Isa Othman, a Supreme Court of Nigeria Judge from Maiduguri, and Uthman Muhammad Dangungu, a former leading preacher of the Izala Society. In Nigeria, the Quranists will also call Sunnis Qāla Qato (lit. "Man said"), after their statement that what man says is not accepted as authoritative, unlike the Qur'anic Qāla Allāhu ("God said").

=== Quranist movement in Turkey and Europe ===
In Turkey, Quranist ideas have been making themselves felt since the mid-1970s. One of the first and most important thinkers in this line is the Islamic theologian Hüseyin Atay. Among other things, he wrote his own translation of the Qur'an and was of the opinion that Islam at the time of the Prophet consisted only of the Qur'an and reason. It was only after the death of the Prophet that people began to refer to Hadiths, statements by companions of the Prophet and scholarly opinions, which in the long term led to alienation from the Qur'an and imitation of scholars. All extra-Quranic sources and tradition belonged only to the realm of religious culture and should be critically examined. Similar ideas were held by his student Yaşar Nuri Öztürk (d. 2016), who also wrote his own translation of the Qur'an.

Kerem Adıgüzel, a Swiss-Turkish author, founded the German-language website Alrahman.de in 2007 and the Al-Rahman – mit Vernunft und Hingabe (Al-Rahman – With Reason and Dedication) association in 2017. In addition to a return to the Qur'an, Adıgüzel is solely committed to a "de-Arabisation" of Islam, tries to make the Qur'an more accessible to German-speaking readers in particular and to enable independent interpretation. His arguments regarding the rejection of the Sunnah and Hadiths as well as his conviction of a mathematical code in the Qur'an are largely in line with the ideas of Edip Yüksel. In his book Key to Understanding the Qur'an, Adıgüzel describes his attitude to the hadiths as follows:

"Aḥādīṯ, in German sayings, do not explain the reading, but rather dilute it with new words and new questions, new (often meaningless) laws, superstitions and sometimes even blasphemies. They elevate themselves as another authority alongside God's Word by selling themselves as "Islamic." They unconsciously demand that we associate them with God's word and thus make ourselves guilty of the capital sin in faith par excellence, namely the shirk, the association of other deities and authorities besides God. These sayings do not represent prophetic words. The prophet himself was always against the writing of his personal sayings [...], which is why in the first century no book was written that records the personal words of the prophet."

– Adıgüzel: Key to Understanding the Koran. 2015, p. 197.

== Around the world ==
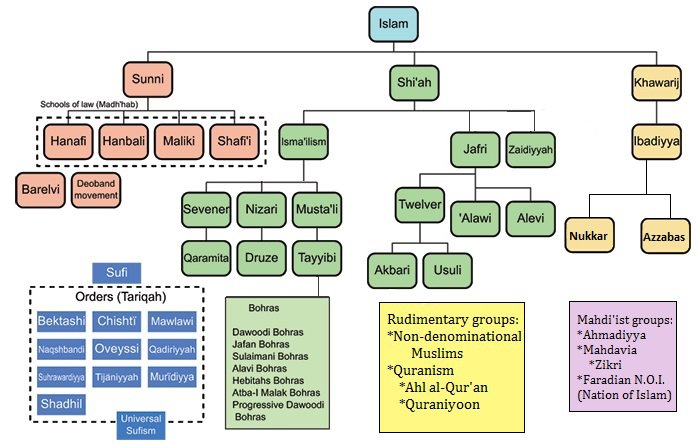
Diagram showing the branches of Sunnism, Shi'ism, Ibadism, Quranism, Non-denominational Muslims, Ahmadiyya and Sufism.

In the 21st century, Qur'anist rejection of the Hadith has gained traction among modernist Muslims who want to throw out any Hadith that they believe contradicts the Qur'an. Both modernist Muslims and Qur'anists believe that the problems in the Islamic world come partly from the traditional elements of the Hadith and seek to reject those teachings. Rejecting the Hadith has become a growing trend in the Middle East and North Africa, such as in Egypt and Morocco.

According to Dr. Aisha Y. Musa, Quranists in Egypt and elsewhere have stirred heated discussions in the Muslim world. Quranism has been criticised by Sunnis and Shias. The Sunni belief is that "...the Quran needs the Sunnah more than the Sunnah needs the Quran." The Sunnis and Shias argues that Islam can not be practised without Hadith. Sunnis have often described Quranists as Khawarij.

=== Egypt ===
In Egypt, Quranists are a religious minority. The Quranist trend began in 1977, when Quranists took the initiative to debunk Sahih al-Bukhari and its assumed sanctification inside Al-Azhar Mosque. Quranists who have been vocal in their criticism of Hadiths include Ahmed Subhy Mansour, Ibrahim Eissa, Islaam Behery, Khaled Muntaser, and Ahmed Abdo Maher.

=== India ===
Quranism gained a significant following in India in the 19th century. The movement introduced by Syed Ahmad Khan was the most influential and coordinated effort in the formation of Quranism. Another ground for the creation of Quranism was opposition to Ahl-i Hadith. Another influential Quranist during this period was Chiragh Ali. Two movements started in the Indian subcontinent after the publication of Syed Ahmad Khan's and Chiragh Ali's beliefs. The center of the first movement was in Lahore, led by Abdullah Chakralawi. Chakralawi founded the Ahl-i Quran movement, which has been described by Aziz Ahmad and Dietrich Reetz as a "fundamentalist splinter group of Ahl-i-Hadith" while Francis Robinson has described it as puritanical. Alongside his criticism of Hadiths, Chakralawi opposed Sufism and vehemently condemned the shrine-based practices and Piri-Muridi traditions of the time.

Chakralawi established a Quranist mosque with the financial assistance of his disciple Shaykh Muhammad Chittu (d. 1911) in Lahore. Mohammad Ramadan was a student of Chakralawi who established the Quranist sect "Omaht Moslem" and the Quranist institution "Ahl al-Zekr va al-Quran". Another Quranist sect in Amritsar was founded by Khawaja Ahmad al-Din Amritsari, who later founded the "Omeh Moslemeh Association" in Lahore.

In 2024, the Quranist population in India was estimated to be one million.

=== Morocco ===
In Morocco, rejecting the Hadith has become a growing trend. Quranists who have been vocal in their criticism of hadiths include Ahmed Assid, Mohamed Lamsiah, and Rachid Aylal.

=== Niger and Nigeria ===
Kala Kato is a Quranist movement based in Niger and northern Nigeria. Kala Kato leaders established a mosque in Kaduna. In 2009, they engaged in skirmishes with Nigerian police at Zango on the outskirts of Bauchi, resulting in the deaths of 38 people. Similar cases occurred in Maiduguri in 2004. In Niger, Sunni Imams have urged the government to suppress Kala Kato, who have been described as militant.

Previously in Nigeria, Quranism took on a militant dimension, with the Yan Tatsine movement, founded by Mohammed Marwa, better known by his nickname Maitatsine, which publicly adopted the slogan "Only Qur'an" as the foundation of the religion.

=== Pakistan ===
Quranists are present in Pakistan. In 1920, the Lahore High Court gave legitimacy to the Ahl-e Quran group as a Muslim sect.

=== Russia ===
In 2018, the Russian Council of Muftis issued a Fatwa that, contrary to its apparent intent, contained statements supportive of Quran-centric views. The Fatwa, ostensibly aimed at defending Sunnah, actually criticised Hadith-centrism and emphasised the primacy of the Qur'an. It suggested that an ideal Islamic society could be built solely on Quranic teachings, without the need for Hadiths. This unexpected stance from a major Islamic authority in Russia sparked debate within the Muslim community, with some praising the Fatwa's Quran-centric approach while others, particularly Hadith-centrists, expressed concern over its implications for traditional Islamic scholarship.

=== Saudi Arabia ===
In 2023, in a major departure from Wahhabism, King Salman bin Abdulaziz Al Saud ordered the establishment of an authority in Medina to scrutinise uses of the Hadith that are used by preachers and jurists to support teachings and edicts on all aspects of life. According to Khmer Times, the reforms of Saudi Crown Prince Mohammed bin Salman have been influenced by the Ahl-e Quran group.

Previously, in 2018, Saudi Quranist scholar Hassan al-Maliki was arrested and charged with capital crimes for his political views, opposition to the more strict Saudi Wahhabism, and for promoting ideas that have been described as "Quranist", "moderate", "tolerant". Other Saudi intellectuals, like Abd al-Rahman al-Ahdal, continue to advocate for the abandonment of Hadith and a return to the Qur'an.

=== Sudan ===
In 2015, Quranists in Sudan were imprisoned and sentenced to death for recognising the Qur'an and rejecting the Hadith. After being arrested for more than five weeks, the men were released on bail.

=== Syria ===
There is a Quranist community within Syria, who began forming in the 19th century and followed the teachings set forth by the Indian theologian Syed Ahmad Khan and then spread to Syria soon afterwards via intermediary pilgrims. However, Quranist adherents precede these 19th century developments in the form of Mu'tazilites such as Ibrāhīm an-Naẓẓām, who lived for some period in these environs. Contemporary adherents of Quranism in Syria have included Muhammad Shahrur.

=== Turkey ===
In Turkey, Quranist ideas became particularly noticeable, with portions of the youth either leaving Sunni Islam or converting to Quranism. There has been significant Quranist scholarship in Turkey, with there being even Quranist theology professors in significant universities, including scholars like Yaşar Nuri Öztürk and Caner Taslaman.

The "Ankara School" was characterised by historical criticism and a revivification of Mu'tazilite rationality. The origin of its approach is traced to the 1980s, when Edip Yüksel, invoking critical Hadith studies to question the reliability of the Sunnah's transmission, proposed a Quran-only formula.

Quranists have responded to the criticisms of the Turkish Directorate of Religious Affairs (Diyanet) with arguments and challenged them to a debate.

== Notable organisations ==
=== Association Internationale des Musulmans Coraniques (AIMC) ===
The Association Internationale des Musulmans Coraniques (AIMC), or International Association of Quranic Muslims is a Quranist organisation founded by the Tunisian author, professor, and Islamologist Mohamed Talbi. The organisation aims to promote Quranism and counter the preaching of Salafism and Wahhabism.

=== Izgi Amal ===
İzgi Amal (Kazakh: Ізгі амал) is a Quranist organisation in Kazakhstan. It has an estimated 70 to 80 thousand members. Its leader, Aslbek Musin, is the son of the former Speaker of the Majlis, Aslan Musin.

The first true Quranist was the Prophet Muhammad, who did not follow anything except the Qur'an. Quranists are not a new direction in this respect.

— Aslbek Musin

=== Kala Kato ===
Kala Kato is a Quranist movement whose adherents reside mostly in northern Nigeria, with some adherents residing in Niger. Kala Kato means a "man says" in the Hausa language, in reference to the sayings, or Hadiths, posthumously attributed to Muhammad. Kala Kato accept only the Qur'an as authoritative and believe that anything that is not Kala Allah, which means "God says" in the Hausa language, is Kala Kato.

=== Quran Sunnat Society ===
The Quran Sunnat Society is a Quranist movement in India. The movement was behind the first ever woman to lead mixed-gender congregational prayers in India. It maintains an office and headquarters within Kerala. There is a large community of Quranists in Kerala. One of its leaders, Jamida Beevi, has also spoken out against India's triple talaq law which is mostly based on the Sunni inspired Muslim Personal Law (Shariat) Application Act, 1937. The most prominent predecessor to the Quran Sunnat Society in India was the views put forth by Syed Ahmed Khan in the 19th century.

=== Tolu-e-Islam ===
The movement was initiated by Ghulam Ahmed Perwez. Ghulam Ahmed Perwez did not reject all Hadiths; however, he accepted only Hadiths that "are in accordance with the Quran or do not stain the character of the Prophet or his Companions." The organisation publishes and distributes books, pamphlets, and recordings of Perwez's teachings. Tolu-e-Islam does not belong to any political party, nor does it belong to any religious group or sect.

=== United Submitters International ===
In the United States, at the end of the 20th century, the Egyptian Quranist Rashad Khalifa, who is known as the proponent of the Qur'an code (Code 19), which is a mathematical code in the Qur'an, developed a theological doctrine that influenced Quranists in many other countries. With the aid of computers, he performed a numerical analysis of the Qur'an that, according to his claims, demonstrated its divine origin. The number 19, which is mentioned in chapter 74 of the Qur'an as being "one of the greatest miracles" played the fundamental role, which according to Khalifa can be found everywhere in the structure of the Quran. Some objected to these beliefs and, in 1990, Khalifa was assassinated by someone associated with the Sunni group Jamaat ul-Fuqra.

The organisation United Submitters International (USI) founded by Khalifa has its center in Tucson and has published a monthly newsletter with the title Submitter's Perspective since 1985. The movement popularised the phrase: "The Quran, the whole Quran, and nothing but the Quran." Among those influenced by Khalifa's ideas include Edip Yüksel, Ahmad Rashad, and Supreme Court of Nigeria Judge, Isa Othman.

A Turkish (of Kurdish descent) activist, Edip Yüksel, initially campaigned for a Quranist-Islamic revolution in Turkey, which is why he was imprisoned. Later he met Khalifa and joined the organisation after witnessing the "19 miracle". In 1989 he had to leave the country because of this and joined the headquarters in Tucson. Yüksel and two other authors created their own translation of the Quran. In some points, however, his views differ from those of Khalifa.

== Notable individuals ==
Individuals with full or partial Quranistic ideas include:

- Mohammad Sadeqi Tehrani (1926–2011), Iranian Shia thinker who followed a Quranist approach in his legal ways. He studied in seminaries of Qum, Iran under Ruhollah Khomeini and Muhammad Husayn Tabataba'i.
- Kassim Ahmad (1933–2017), Malaysian intellectual, writer, poet and an educator known for his rejection of the authority of Hadiths. He was the founder of the Quranic Society of Malaysia. At the time of his death, he was working on a Malay translation of the Quran.
- Muammar Gaddafi (1942–2011), Libyan revolutionary, politician and political theorist. He governed Libya as the "Brotherly Leader" of the Great Socialist People's Libyan Arab Jamahiriya until 2011. He ruled according to his own Third International Theory.
- Gamal al-Banna (1920–2013), Egyptian author and trade unionist.
- Muhammad Shahrur (1938–2019), Syrian philosopher and author.
- Mustafa İslamoğlu (born 1960), Turkish theologian, poet and writer. He was criticised in Turkey and received threats for his ideas that promoted logic above tradition and denying the authority of Hadith, who he saw to be fabricated.
- Rashad Khalifa (1935–1990), Egyptian-American biochemist, professor, theologian, computer expert and Islamic reformer. In his book Quran, Hadith and Islam and his English translation of the Qur'an, Khalifa argued that the Qur'an alone is the sole source of Islamic belief and practice. He claimed that the Qur'an had a code-system based on the number 19 which proved it's divinity. One of his students included Ahmad Rashad (born 1949), who studied the Arabic language and the Qur'an with Khalifa.
- Hassan al-Maliki (born 1970), a Saudi Arabian writer, historian and scholar.
- Ahmed Subhy Mansour (born 1949), Egyptian-American Islamic scholar.
- Chekannur Maulavi (born 1936), Islamic cleric who lived in Edappal in Malappuram district of Kerala, India. He was noted for his controversial and unconventional interpretation of Islam based on the Qur'an alone.
- Yaşar Nuri Öztürk (1951–2016), Turkish university professor of Islamic theology, lawyer, columnist and a former member of Turkish parliament. Öztürk died in 2016, due to stomach cancer.
- Muhammad Tawfiq Sidqi (1881–1920), Egyptian scholar and physician who focused on criticising Hadith as a whole from the Qur'an as well as based on Hadithic pseudo-scientific claims on medicine.
- Mohamed Talbi (1921–2017), Tunisian historian and professor. He was the founder of the Association Internationale des Musulmans Coraniques (AIMC), or International Association of Quranic Muslims.
- Caner Taslaman (born 1968), Turkish academician and writer known for his works on the Big Bang theory and the scientific structure of the Qur'an.
- Edip Yüksel (born 1957), Turkish philosopher, lawyer, Quranist advocate, author of Nineteen: God's Signature in Nature and Scripture, Manifesto for Islamic Reform and a co-author of Quran: A Reformist Translation. He taught philosophy and logic at Pima Community College and medical ethics and criminal law courses at Brown Mackie College.

== See also ==
- Liberalism and progressivism within Islam
- Islamic schools and branches
- Protestantism and Islam
- Sola scriptura, an analogous doctrine within Christianity
- Karaite Judaism, an analogous movement within Judaism
- Ban on Hadith

== Sources ==
- Burton, John (1977). The Collection of the Qur'an. Cambridge: Cambridge University Press. ISBN 978-0-521-21439-1.
- Della Vida, Giorgio Levi (1978). "Khāridjites". In van Donzel, E.; Lewis, B.; Pellat, Ch. & Bosworth, C. E. (eds.). The Encyclopaedia of Islam, Second Edition. Volume IV: Iran–Kha. Leiden: E. J. Brill. pp. 1074–1077. ISBN 978-90-04-05745-6. OCLC 758278456.
- Lewinstein, Keith (1991). "The Azāriqa in Islamic Heresiography". Bulletin of the School of Oriental and African Studies, University of London. 54 (2): 251–268. doi:10.1017/S0041977X00014774. JSTOR 619134. S2CID 162230832.
- Lewinstein, Keith (2008). "Azāriqa". In Fleet, Kate; Krämer, Gudrun; Matringe, Denis; Nawas, John; Rowson, Everett (eds.). Encyclopaedia of Islam (3rd ed.). Brill Online. doi:10.1163/1573-3912_ei3_COM_0171. ISSN 1873-9830.
