= Yaşar Nuri Öztürk =

Turkish philosopher (1951–2016)

Prof. Dr. Yaşar Nuri Öztürk

Personal life
- Born: 5 February 1951 Bayburt, Turkey
- Died: 22 June 2016 (aged 65) Istanbul, Turkey
- Main interest(s): Islamic philosophy, 'Aqidah, Kalam, Tafsir, Sufism
- Notable works: Kur'an'daki İslam; Kur'an Meali
- Education: Istanbul University
- Website: ynovakfi.org

Religious life
- Religion: Islam
- Denomination: Quranism

Muslim leader
- Influenced by: al-Hallaj, Socrates, Ibrahim al-Nazzam, Nasir Khusraw, Mehmet Akif Ersoy, Mustafa Kemal Atatürk, Muhammad Iqbal, Muhammed Hamdi Yazır
- Influenced: Mustafa İslamoğlu, Edip Yüksel, Caner Taslaman

Yaşar Nuri Öztürk (February 5, 1951 – June 22, 2016) was a Turkish Islamic scholar, university professor of Islamic philosophy, lawyer, columnist and a former member of Turkish parliament. He has been described as a Quranist and has given many conferences on Islamic thought, humanity and human rights in Turkey, the US, Europe, the Middle East and the Balkans. In 1999, members of a violent extremist group called Great Eastern Islamic Raiders' Front (İBDA-C) confessed that they had planned an assassination attempt that never took place.

== Life ==
He was born in Bayburt on February 5, 1951, but grew up in the village of Fındıcak of Sürmene, Trabzon in Turkey's Black Sea Region.

He has served as both faculty member and dean at the Istanbul University for over 26 years. He taught Islamic thought at the Theological Seminary of Barrytown in New York for one year as a guest professor, during which time he also made major contributions to the Islamic section of the anthology, “The World Scripture.”

He has given many conferences on Islamic thought, humanity and human rights in Turkey, the US, Europe, the Middle East and the Balkans. Yaşar Nuri Öztürk represents an interpretation of Islam which is secular and social democratic.

Öztürk died in his home aged 65 in the afternoon of June 22, 2016. Diagnosed with stomach cancer, he underwent a surgery on November 12, 2011, and was treated then three and half months long. He was hospitalized a couple of days prior to his death in Yeditepe University's hospital, was discharged back home after treatment. On June 24, he was interred at Kanlıca Cemetery following the religious funeral service held at Şakirin Mosque in Istanbul.

=== Political life ===
Öztürk was elected to the Turkish Parliament in 2002 as Istanbul deputy, started People's Ascent Movement and in his leadership this movement turned into a political party (2005) named People's Ascent Party (HYP). However, he resigned from active politics in October 2009, and turned his efforts to writing and propagation of roots of Islam through understanding of Qur'an. Since then, he has appeared on many regularly scheduled TV shows, some of which he was a constant guest. A notable format of these shows is the reading and explanation of the Qur'an in Turkish. In these shows, a host would read the Qur'an in Turkish, and Prof. Öztürk would explain the meanings and significance.

== Publications ==
His lengthy articles, such as “Islam and Europe,” (Die Zeit, February 20, 2003); “Islam and Democracy,” [“Desperately Seeking Europe,” London (Archetype Publications), 2003, pp. 198–210; Europa Leidenschaftlich Gesucht, München-Zürich, (Piper Verlag) 2003, pp. 210–224], “İslam-Batı İlişkileri ve Bunun KEİ Ülkelerindeki Yansımaları” (Chelovecheskiy Faktor: Obschestvo i Vlast, 2004–4), along with the extensive interviews he has given on the subjects of Islam, the West and secularism [for example, see “al-Ahram” (weekly), February 1–7, 2001] have had a deep impact in both the West and the Islamic world.

His books, which have been published in Turkish, German, English and Persian, number than 30. His magnum opus, “The Islam of the Qur’an,” is considered one of the pioneering works of the “Back to the Qur’an” movement. Öztürk's role and contributions to this movement, along with the world of his thought, have been the subject of a large number of theses in Turkish, German, English and French at various international universities. He praised Sevener-Qarmatians during the first fifty pages of his recently published book about Mansur Al-Hallaj and the achievements of their social revolution.

The articles, poetry and interviews that have been published on Öztürk in the Turkish and international press now make up an archive, and an independent effort is in progress to assemble it all into book form.

He also made the first Turkish translation of the Qur'an after Elmalılı Muhammed Hamdi Yazır's Qur'anic exegesis-Hakk Dīni Kur'an Dili originally published in 1935. This translation, which went into 126 printings between 1993 and 2003, is recognized as the most printed book in the history of the Turkish Republic.

In addition to his many books on understanding Islam and the Qur'an he has written sociological/historical books; notably the "Kur'an Penceresinden Kurtuluş Savaşı'na Bir Bakış" (An Investigation of The War of Independence Through a Qur'anic Point of View). In this book he explains the true Islamic/Qur'anic roots of the secular Turkish republic. Thereby, Öztürk establishes that the founders of the Turkish Republic, their revolutions, and even the separation of religion and state were principles decreed by Islam and the Qur'an, and the founders (Kemal Atatürk in particular) were true followers of Islam, and Qur'anic principles. Moreover, he maintains some views on the possibility of reincarnation by the ta'wil of some mutashabih ayah of Qur'an.

Öztürk was among the contributors of the Hareket magazine.
