= Salisu =

Salisu is a given name and surname. Notable people with the name include:

== Given name ==
- Salisu Buhari (born 1970), former Speaker of the House of Representatives of Nigeria
- Salisu Matori, Nigerian Senator from Bauchi State
- Salisu Yusuf (born 1962), Nigerian footballer and manager

== Surname ==
- Mohammadu Salisu (born 1934), Ghanaian footballer
- Mohammed Salisu (born 1999), Ghanaian footballer
