= Mohammed Marwa =

Mohammed Marwa may refer to:

- Mohammed Buba Marwa, a Nigerian politician
- Maitatsine, born Mohammed Marwa, controversial Islamic scholar
