= Islam in Nigeria =

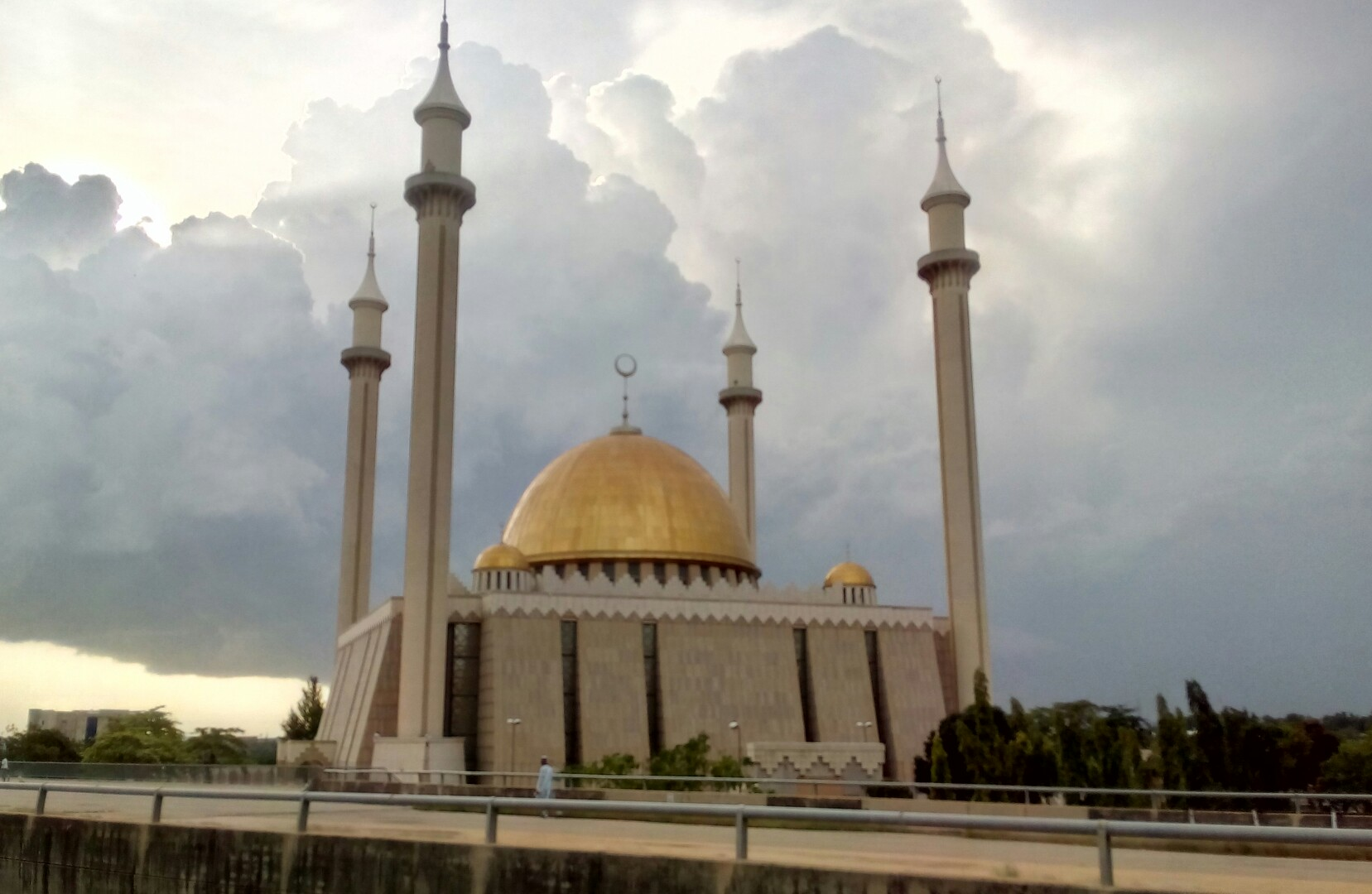
- Abuja National Mosque, the national mosque of Nigeria

Total population
- ▲120 million (est., 2020); 56.1% of the population.

Islam is one of the two largest religions in Nigeria. Nigeria also has the largest Muslim population in Africa. In 2018, the CIA World Factbook estimated that 53.5% of Nigeria's population is Muslim. Islam is predominantly concentrated in the northern half of the country, The southwestern states also have majority Muslim population. State like Lagos, Ogun, Oyo and Osun.The Eastern and the southern parts of the country also has a significant Muslim minority existing in the regions. Most of Northern Nigeria is governed under Sharia law, while the rest of the country is governed under secular law. The Muslim share of Nigeria's population is growing, due to a higher fertility rate.

Merchants from North Africa and the Senegalese basin introduced Islam to what is now Nigeria during the 11th century, and it was the first monotheistic Abrahamic religion to arrive in Nigeria. The northern half of Nigeria was historically under the rule of various Islamic states and empires such as the Kanem–Bornu Empire, the Mali Empire, the Songhai Empire, and the Hausa Kingdoms. The Sokoto Caliphate, founded by Fulani Islamic scholar Usman dan Fodio, dominated northern Nigeria throughout the 19th century during the Fula jihads, until it was annexed by the British Empire in 1903. Portuguese missionaries introduced Christianity to the southern half of Nigeria during the 15th century, and it grew to be a dominant religion in Nigeria alongside Islam during British colonial rule beginning in the late 19th century.

Muslims in Nigeria are predominantly Sunnis of the Maliki school of thought. However, there is a significant Shia minority, primarily in Kaduna, Kano, Katsina, Osun, Kwara, Yobe and Sokoto states (see Shia in Nigeria). In particular, A 2008 Pew Forum survey on religious diversity identified 5% of Nigerian Muslims as Shia. The Ahmadiyya movement and Non-denominational muslims also have a sizable presence in the country.

== History ==
=== Islam in Northern Nigeria ===
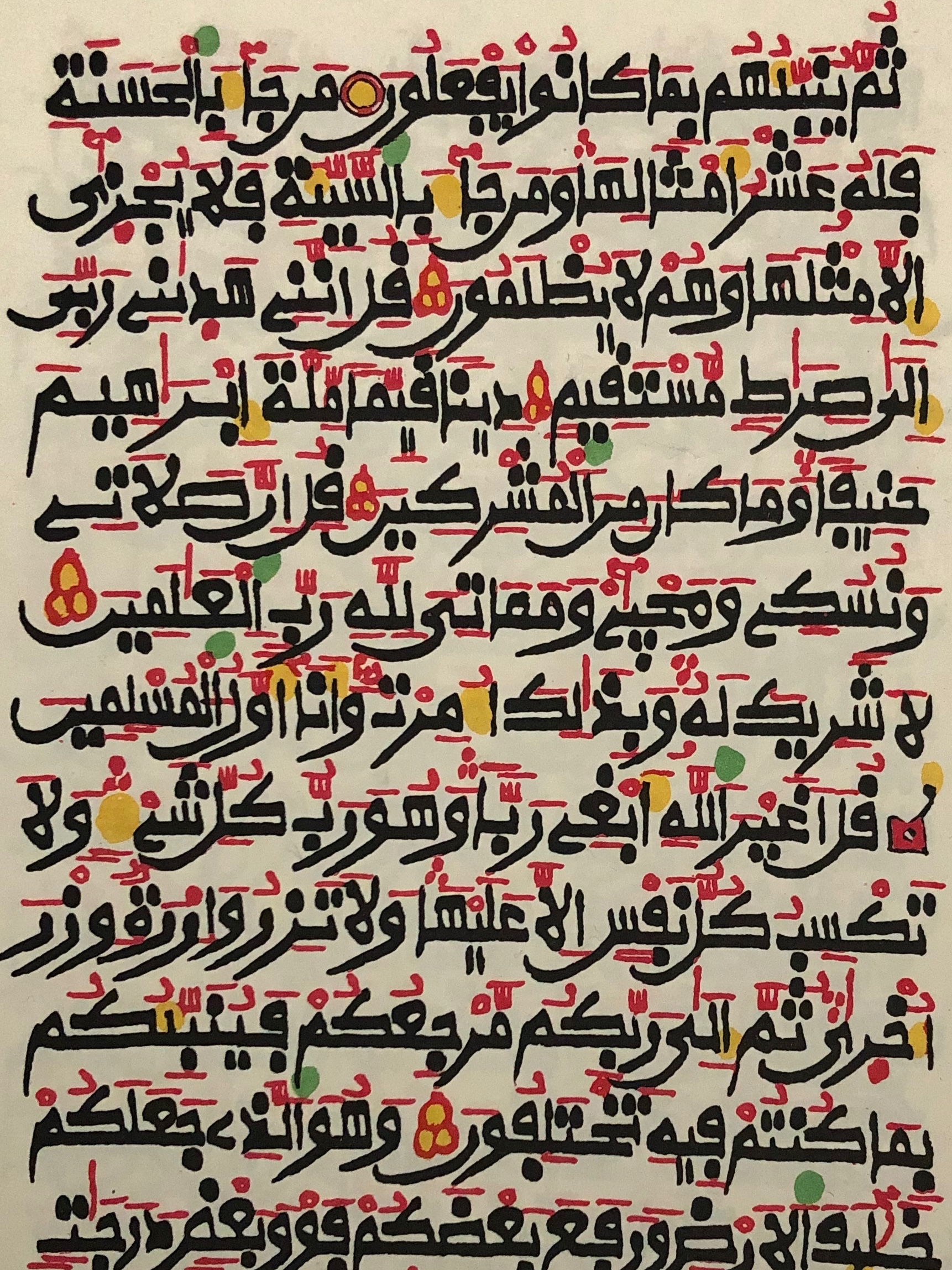
A page of the Qur'an written in the Hausawi script of Hausaland

Islam was introduced to Nigeria during the 11th century through two geographical routes: North Africa and the Senegalese Basin. The origins of Islam in the country is linked with the development of Islam in the wider West Africa. Trade was the major connecting link that brought Islam into Nigeria. Islam was first documented in Central Sudan by medieval Islamic historians and geographers such as Al-Bakri, Yaqut al-Hamawi and Al-Maqrizi and later works of Ibn Battuta and Ibn Khaldun offered more notes about Islam in West Africa.

Islam grew in North-East Nigeria, in particular, the Kanem empire as a result of trade between Kanem and Northern African regions of Fezzan, Egypt and Cyrenaica in the eleventh century. Muslim merchants from the North sometimes remained in settlements along trade routes, this merchant class would later preach the message of Islam to their host communities. The first documented conversion of a traditional ruler was in the eleventh century when Mai Ume Jilmi of Kanem was converted by a Muslim scholar whose descendants later held a hereditary title of Chief Imam of Kanem.

Writings by Ahmad Fartua an Imam during the period of Idris Alooma provided glimpse of an active Islamic community in Bornu while religious archives showed Islam had been adopted as the religion of the majority of the leading figures in the Borno Empire during the reign of Mai (king) Idris Alooma (1571–1603), although a large part of that country still adhered to traditional religions. Alooma furthered the cause of Islam in the country by introducing Islamic courts, establishing mosques, and setting up a hostel in Makkah, the Islamic pilgrimage destination, for Kanuris.

In Hausaland, particularly Kano, Islam is noted to have penetrated the territory in the fourteenth century from West African traders who were the Mande people Muslims from the Senegalese basin and Muslim traders from Mali Empire. Muhammed Rumfa (1463 - 1499) was the first ruler to convert to Islam in Hausaland. It had spread to the major cities of the northern part of the country by the 16th century, later moving into the countryside and towards the Middle Belt uplands. However, there are some claims for an earlier arrival. The Nigeria-born Muslim scholar Sheikh Dr. Abu-Abdullah Abdul-Fattah Adelabu has argued that Islam had reached Sub-Sahara Africa, including Nigeria, as early as the 1st century of Hijrah through Muslim traders and expeditions during the reign of the Arab conqueror, Uqba ibn al Nafia (622–683), whose Islamic conquests under the Umayyad dynasty, during Muawiyah's and Yazid's time, spread all Northern Africa or the Maghrib Al-Arabi, which includes present-day Algeria, Tunisia, Libya and Morocco.

==== Fulani War ====
In the early 19th century, Islamic scholar Usman dan Fodio launched a jihad, which is called the Fulani War, against the Hausa Kingdoms of Northern Nigeria. He was victorious, and established the Fulani Empire with its capital at Sokoto.

==== Sokoto Caliphate ====
Sokoto Caliphate, c. 1875

In 1803, Usman dan Fodio founded the Sokoto Caliphate. Usman dan Fodio was elected "Commander of the Faithful" (Amir al-Mu'minin) by his followers. The Sokoto Caliphate became one of the largest empires in Africa, stretching from modern-day Burkina Faso to Cameroon and including most of northern Nigeria and southern Niger. At its height, the Sokoto state included over 30 different emirates under its political structure. In its hold, the caliphate ruled through much of the 19th century, until 29 July 1903, the second battle of Burmi concluded its dissolution by British and German forces.

=== Islam in Southwestern Nigeria ===
Islam also came to the southwestern Yoruba-speaking areas during the time of the Mali Empire. In his Movements of Islam in face of the Empires and Kingdoms in Yorubaland, Sheikh Dr. Abu-Abdullah Adelabu supported his claims on early arrival of Islam in the southwestern Nigeria by citing the Arab anthropologist Abduhu Badawi, who argued that the fall of Koush southern Egypt and the prosperity of the politically multicultural Abbasid period in the continent had created several streams of migration, moving west in the mid-9th Sub-Sahara. According to Adelabu, the popularity and influences of the Abbasid dynasty, the second great dynasty with the rulers carrying the title of 'Caliph' fostered peaceful and prosperous search of pastures by the inter-cultured Muslims from Nile to Niger and Arab traders from Desert to Benue, echoing the conventional historical view that the conquest of North Africa by the Islamic Umayyad Caliphate between AD 647–709 effectively ended Catholicism in Africa for several centuries. Islam in Ancient Yoruba is referred to as Esin Imale, which folk etymology states it comes from the word "Mali." The earliest introduction of the religion to that region was through Malian itinerant traders (Wangara Traders) around the 14th century. Large-scale conversion to Islam happened in the 18th-19th centuries.

Yorubas came in contact with Islam around the 14th century during the reign of Mansa Kankan Musa of the Mali Empire. According to Al-Aluri, the first mosque was built in Ọyọ-Ile in AD 1550 although, there were no Yoruba Muslims, the mosque only served the spiritual needs of foreign Muslims living in Ọyọ.

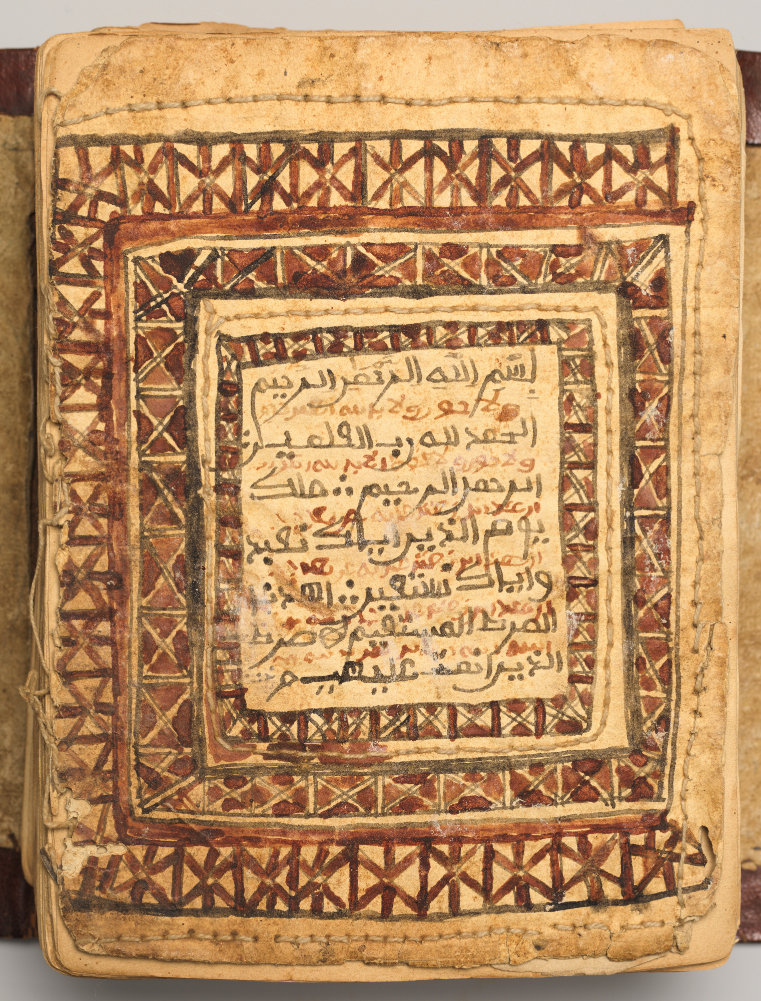
A 19th-century Qur'an written in the Barnawi script of Bornu

Progressively, Islam came to Yoruba land, and Muslims started building Mosques: Iwo town led, its first Mosque built in 1655 followed by Iṣẹyin, in 1760; Lagos, 1774; Ṣaki, 1790; and Oṣogbo, 1889. In time, Islam spread to other towns like Oyo (the first Oyo convert was Solagberu), Ibadan, Abẹokuta, Ijẹbu-Ode, Ikirun, and Ẹdẹ before the 19th-century Sokoto jihad. Several factors contributed to the rise of Islam in Yoruba land by mid 19th century. Before the decline of Ọyọ, several towns around it had large Muslim communities; when Ọyọ was destroyed these Muslims (Yoruba and immigrants) relocated to newly formed towns and villages and became Islam protagonists. Second, there was a mass movement of people at this time into Yoruba land, many of these immigrants were Muslims who introduced Islam to their host. According to Eades, the religion "differed in attraction" and "better adapted to Yoruba social structure, because it permitted polygamy"; more influential Yorubas like (Seriki Kuku of Ijebu land) soon became Muslims with positive impact on the natives. Islam came to Lagos at about the same time like other Yoruba towns, however, it received royal support from Ọba Kosọkọ, after he came back from exile in Ẹpẹ. According to Gbadamọṣi (1972; 1978 in Eades, 1980) Islam soon spread to other Yoruba towns, especially, during the intra-tribal wars-when there was a high demand for Islamic teachers-who dubbed as both Quran teachers and amulet makers for Yoruba soldiers during the intra-tribal wars in Yoruba land. Islam, like Christianity also found a common ground with the natives that believed in Supreme Being, while there were some areas of disagreements, Islamic teachers impressed upon their audience the need to change from worshipping idols and embrace Allah. Without delay, Islamic scholars and local Imams started establishing Quranic centers to teach Arabic and Islamic studies, much later, conventional schools were established to educate new converts and to propagate Islam. Traditional shrines and ritual sites were replaced with Central Mosques in major Yoruba towns and cities.

=== Maitatsine ===
A fringe and heretical group, led by the cleric Mohammed Marwa Maitatsine, started in Kano in the late 1970s and operated throughout the 1980s. Maitatsine (since deceased) was from Cameroon, and claimed to have had divine revelations superseding those of the Islamic prophet Muhammad. With their own mosques and a doctrine antagonistic to established Islamic and societal leadership, its main appeal was to marginal and poverty-stricken urban in-migrants, whose rejection by the more established urban groups fostered this religious opposition. These disaffected adherents ultimately lashed out at the more traditional mosques and congregations, resulting in violent outbreaks in several cities of the north.

=== Quranists ===
Non-sectarian Muslims who reject the authority of hadith, known as Quranists, Quraniyoon, or 'Yan Kala Kato, are also present in Nigeria. 'Yan Kala Kato is often mistaken for a militant group called Yan Tatsine (also known as Maitatsine), an unrelated group founded by Muhammadu Marwa. Marwa was killed in 1980. Marwa's successor, Musa Makaniki, was arrested in 2004 and sentenced in 2006, but later released. And another leader of Yan Tatsine, Malam Badamasi, was killed in 2009. Notable Nigerian Quranists include Islamic scholars Mallam Saleh Idris Bello.

== Islam in Nigerian society ==
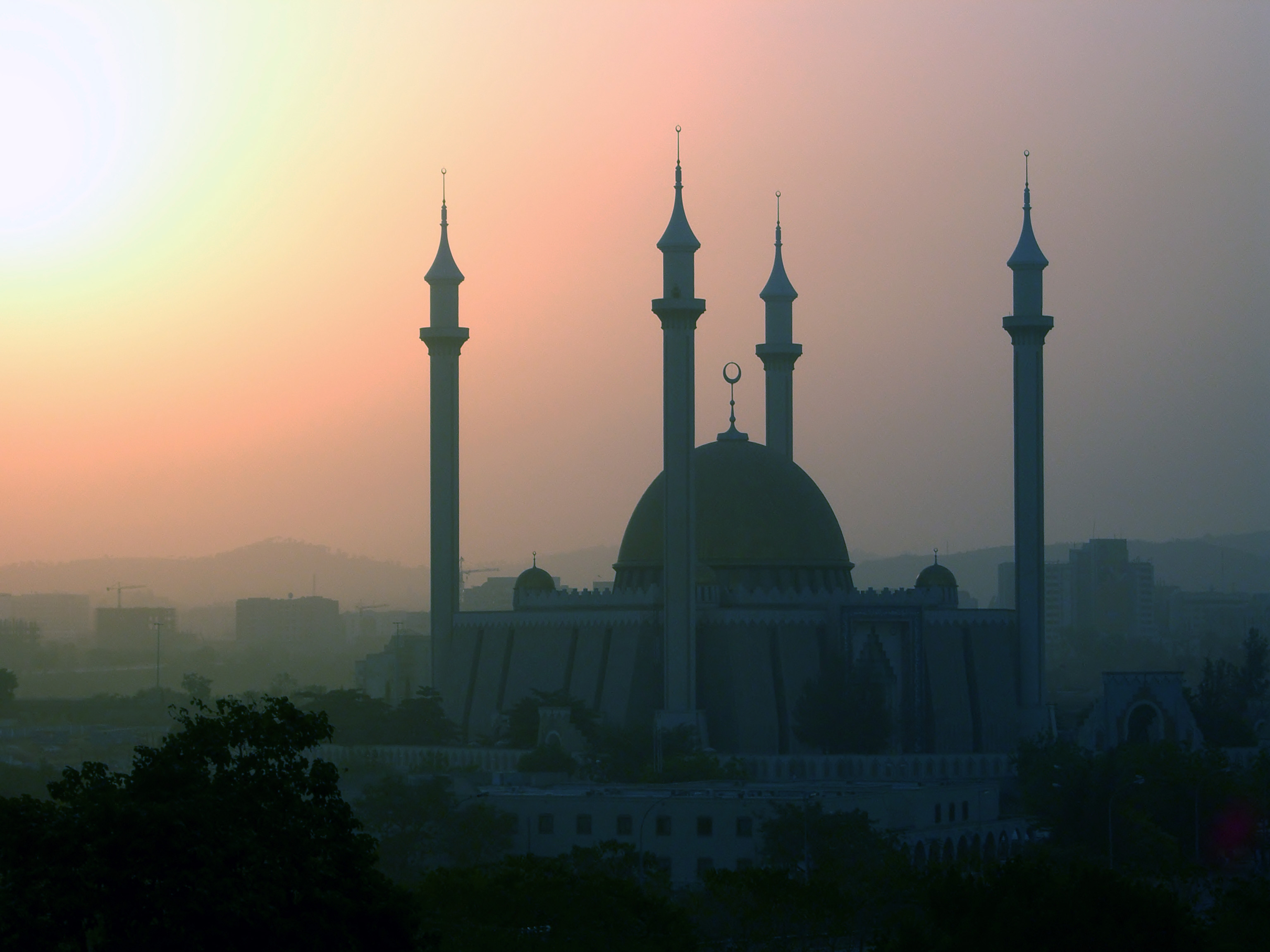
The national mosque during Harmattan

As an institution in Northern Nigeria, Islam plays an important role in society. The five pillars of Islam, including the annual pilgrimage and daily prayers, are seen as important duties of Muslims. Support for the inclusion of a sharia legal system that governs family law and a religious view about modes of personal conduct has support within society.

According to Pew Research Center in 2010, Muslims in Nigeria overwhelmingly favoured Islam playing a large role in politics. A majority of Muslims in Nigeria favoured stoning and/or whipping adulterers, cutting off hands for crimes like theft or robbery, and the death penalty for those who abandon Islam.

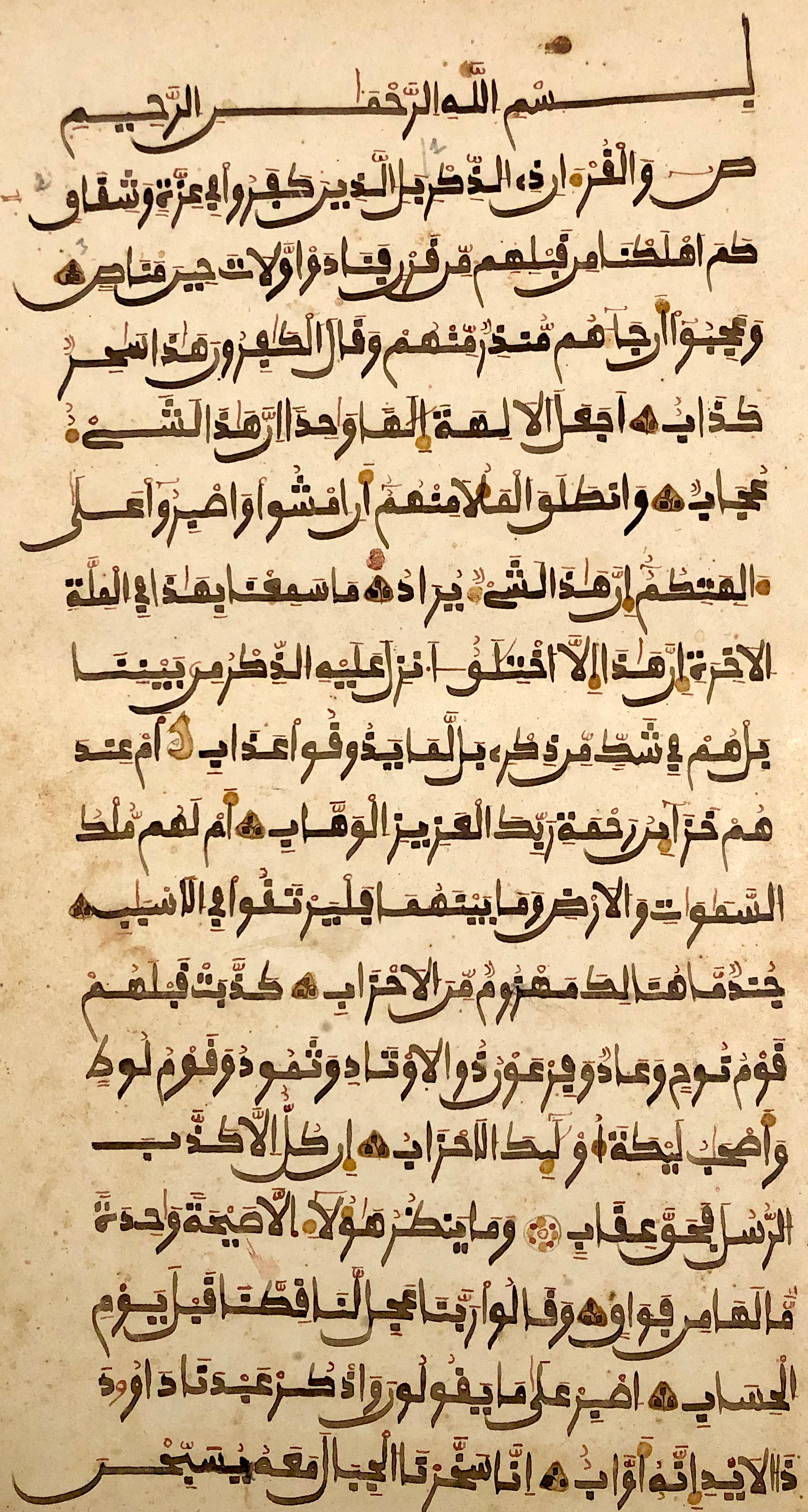
A page from a 19th-century Qur'an written in the Fulani script

Sheikh Adelabu has mentioned other aspects of culture influenced by Islam in Nigeria. He cited Arabic words used in Nigerian languages, especially Yoruba and Hausa names of the days such as Atalata (Ar. Ath-Thulatha الثلاثاء) for Tuesday, Alaruba (Ar. Al-Arbi'a الأربعاء) for Wednesday, Alamisi (Ar. Al-Khamis الخميس) for Thursday, and Jimoh (Ar. Al-Jum'ah الجمعة) for Friday. By far, Ojo Jimoh is the most favourably used. I usually preferred to the unpleasant Yoruba word for Friday Eti, which means Failure, Laziness or Abandonment. Maintaining that the wide adoption of Islamic faith and traditions has succeeded to lay impacts both on written and spoken Nigerian vernaculars, Sheikh Adelabu asserted nearly all technical terms and cultural usages of Hausa and Fulani were derived from Islamic heritages, citing a long list of Hausa words adopted from Arabic. In furthering supports for his claims, Sheikh Adelabu gave the following words to be Yoruba's derivatives of Arabic vocabularies:

- Alaafia i.e. Good, Fine Or Healthy from derivative Al-Aafiah (Ar. العافية)
- Baale i.e. husband or spouse derived from Ba'al (Ar. بعل)
- Sanma i.e. heaven or sky adopted for Samaa` (Ar. السماء)
- Alubarika i.e. blessing used as Al-Barakah (Ar. البركة)
- Wakati i.e. hour or time formed from Waqt (Ar. وقت)
- Asiri i.e. Secrete or Hidden derivative of As-Sirr (Ar. السرّ)

=== Sharia law ===
In 2008, twelve states located in northern Nigeria had fully implemented Sharia law. The twelve states in northern Nigeria have populations where Muslims form the majority.

In 2014, homosexual men were targeted by Hisbah, the religious police. According to a member of the Sharia Commission, homosexuals should be killed by stoning, hanging or pushing them from a high place. In Nigeria, federal law criminalizes homosexual behaviour, but states with Sharia law imposed the death penalty.

=== Influence on culture ===
Historically, Islam fostered trade relations between North Africa and West Africa. Berbers traders from Tiaret during the Rustamid dynasty were involved in commerce with Audoghast. These trade routes went further south into the Kanuri and Hausa states of Northern Nigeria. Sharia was also introduced into Northern Nigeria as Islam spread across the region. In addition to law and trade, Islam had some influence in spreading the choice of dressing, language and choice of names.

Agbada dressing in West Africa is commonly associated with Muslims and Mallams, Iborun (neck covers) is worn by many Muslims in Southern Nigeria during prayers and crochet hats were once mostly worn by Muslims to had performed the pilgrimage. Some Hausa and Yoruba expressions and words are also influenced by Arabic, the language of the Koran. Assalam Alaykum is a familiar expression for greeting by Muslims and Allahu Akbar is used as a call to prayer. Names such as Mohammed, Ibrahim, Yunusa, Lamidi, Aliu and Suleiman are commonly given to Muslim children.

=== Nigerian Muslim Women and Hijab Politics ===
Among the half of the population that is Muslim, it's estimated that about ⅓ of Muslim women in Nigeria wear the hijab. Despite this, there remains a divisive stance on whether hijab should be allowed to be worn by Muslim women and girls in schools, public spaces, and workplaces. Muslim women and girls who wear hijab and other forms of the veil including face coverings have reportedly faced persistent harassment and discrimination in both education and work settings over the last few years. A court decision banning the wearing of hijab in primary and secondary schools in Lagos State was upheld on October 17, 2014, with similar bans implemented formally and informally in other states and levels of institutions. However, the court decision was overturned two years later on July 21, 2016, ruling that “the ban on the use of hijab in public schools in the state was discriminatory against Muslim pupils.” The Lagos State government made another attempt to re-institute the ban in February 2017 and was blocked, affirming the decision to uphold the right to hijab.

=== Traditional Islamic education ===
The practice of Almajiranci by students primarily from rural areas (who are called Almajiri—a transliteration of Al Muhajirun, the Arabic word for emigrant—. The almajiri system in Nigeria is highly controversial. The system has been attacked for promoting youth poverty and delinquency, for failing to teach young boys vocational skills and thus making them unequipped for the workforce, and for radicalizing boys and making them perfect recruits for gangs and Boko Haram. Others believe the almajiri system teaches young boys to be pious, good people who will benefit society.

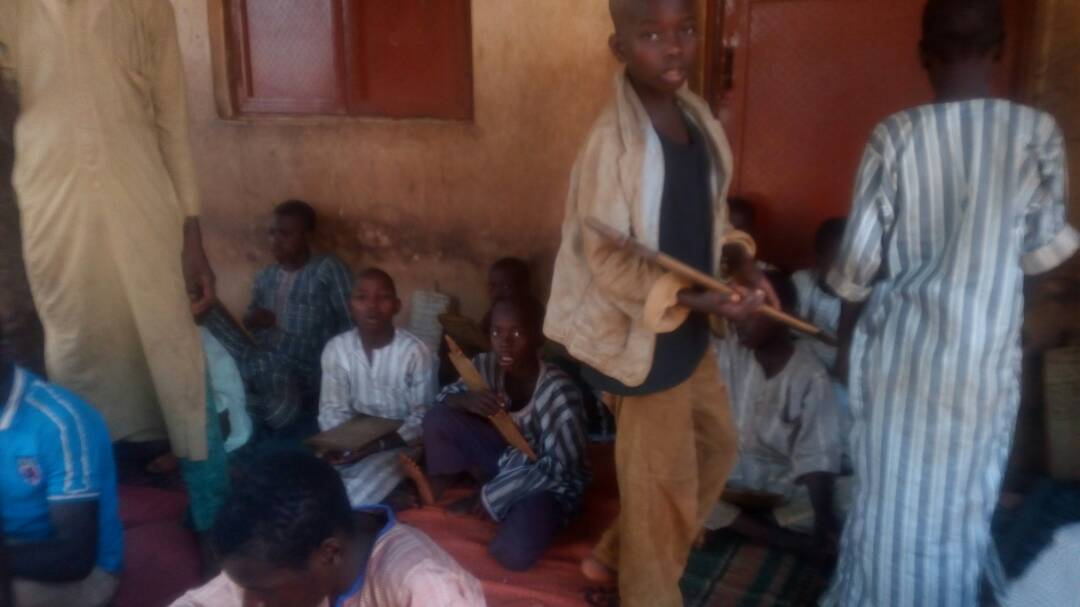
Almajirai at school in Birnin Kebbi, Kebbi State, Nigeria

=== Boko Haram ===
Boko Haram is a terrorist organisation. Its first attack was directed towards the Bauchi prison in 2009.

- On the night of 14–15 April 2014, 276 female students were kidnapped from the Government Secondary School in the town of Chibok in Borno State, Nigeria. Responsibility for the kidnappings was claimed by Boko Haram, an extremist terrorist organization based in northeastern Nigeria. 57 of the schoolgirls managed to escape over the next few months
- On the night of 5–6 May 2014, Boko Haram militants attacked the twin towns of Gamboru and Ngala in Borno State, Nigeria. Roughly 310 residents were killed in the 12-hour attack, and the town was largely destroyed.
- The 2014 Kano bombing was a terrorist attack on November 28, 2014, at the Central Mosque in Kano, Northern Nigeria, during the Boko Haram insurgency. The mosque, situated near the palace of the Emir of Kano, Muhammad Sanusi II, was targeted shortly after the Emir had urged civilians to defend themselves against Boko Haram.

The attack occurred during Friday prayers when three bombs exploded, killing over 120 Muslim worshippers and injuring 260 others. Two suicide bombers detonated their explosives, while gunmen opened fire on people trying to escape.

Witnesses reported that the two explosions happened in the mosque’s courtyard, with a third occurring on a nearby road. One witness noted that the imam was about to begin prayers when a car attempted to force its way into the mosque, and the occupant detonated the bombs after being stopped. This was among the deadliest attacks during the insurgency.

== Organisation of Nigerian Islam ==
Sa'adu Abubakar, the 20th Sultan of Sokoto, is considered the spiritual leader of Nigeria's Muslims.

Several Muslim organisations, lobbies and pressure groups exist, such as Nasfat, MPAC Nigeria and the Muslim Rights Concern.

== See also ==
- Islam by country
- Religion in Nigeria
- Christianity in Nigeria
- Islam in Bangladesh
- Islam in China
- Islam in India
- Islam in Indonesia
- Islam in Iran
- Islam in Pakistan
- Islam in the Philippines
- Islam in Russia
