= Caner Taslaman =

Turkish philosophy professor (born 1968)

Prof. Dr. Caner Taslaman

Personal life
- Born: Osman Caner Uygun; 1968 (age 57–58) Istanbul, Turkey
- Main interest(s): Philosophy of science, Islamic attitudes towards science, Philosophy of religion, Philosophy of physics, Philosophy of biology
- Notable works: Ahlak, Felsefe ve Allah; Allah'ın Varlığının 12 Delili; Neden Müslümanım?
- Education: Boğaziçi University; Marmara University; Istanbul University
- Website: canertaslaman.com

Religious life
- Religion: Islam
- Denomination: Quranism

Muslim leader
- Influenced by: Mehmet Akif Ersoy, Muhammad Iqbal, Rashad Khalifa, Yaşar Nuri Öztürk, Mustafa İslamoğlu, Edip Yüksel

Caner Taslaman (born 1968, Istanbul) is a Turkish academic, professor of religious philosophy, Quran researcher and writer known for his works on the Big Bang theory and the structure of the Quran. He is a professor of philosophy at the Yıldız Technical University.

== Books ==
- Ahlak, Felsefe ve Allah
- Allah, Felsefe ve Bilim
- Allah'ın Varlığının 12 Delili
- Arzulardan Allah'a
- Big Bang ve Tanrı
- Bir Müslüman Evrimci Olabilir mi?
- Evren'den Allah'a
- Evrim Teorisi, Felsefe ve Tanrı
- Kuantum Teorisi, Felsefe ve Tanrı
- Kur'an ve Bilimsel Zihnin İnşası
- Küreselleşme Sürecinde Türkiye'de İslam
- Modern Bilim, Felsefe ve Tanrı
- Terörün ve Cihadın Retoriği
- İslam ve Kadın
- Neden Müslümanım?
