= Hadith: A Re-evaluation =

Hadith: A Re-evaluation is a book by Kassim Ahmad (or Ahmed). In it he writes that the hadith books in Shia and Sunni Islam were introduced without any authoritative basis. It claims that the hadith books were not endorsed by Muhammad, nor by the first four caliphs, nor by the Quran. The book makes the case for Quranism, a minority sect in Islam.

== Author ==
Kassim Ahmed was born in 1933 in Kedah, Malaysia. He has also written several other books, The Road Home: From Socialism to Islam. He had a bachelor's degree in Malay literature and language. he was also a philosopher. He taught at the London School of Oriental and African studies as well as various secondary schools.

== Overview ==
His book Hadith: A re-evaluation argues that the Quran is complete and the hadith is a human invention. He further argues that the hadith were a product of human politics. He also states that the hadith often contradict themselves, contradict the Quran and often contradict scientific facts. He argues that the Quran is the sole source of legislation and argues that use of the hadith in an authoritative way is a sinful bid‘ah (innovation). His public lectures on hadith were subsequently cancelled in late 1985, and his book was banned in Malaysia.

In 1988, M A Rauf responded with a booklet titled "the irrationality of the anti-hadith movement" which argues that hadith are an integral part of Islam.
