= Abdullah Chakralawi =

Indian reformer

Maulvi Abdullah Chakralawi

Personal life
- Born: Qazi Ghulam Nabi
- Died: 1916
- Home town: Chakrala, Punjab
- Parent: Qazi Nur Alam (father)
- Known for: establishing the Ahl al-Qur'an movement
- Occupation: Reformer

Religious life
- Religion: Islam
- Philosophy: Quranism

Muslim leader
- Period in office: 1882-1916

Maulvi Abdullah Chakralawi (Note: Also spelled Chakralavi) (d. 1916 CE) was an Indian reformer who founded the Ahl al-Qur'an movement, which was influential mostly in the Punjab region. He is considered by Qur'anists to be an influence on the later development of Qur'anism in Pakistan.

== Early life ==
Chakralawi was born in Chakrala, Punjab to a Awan family. His father was Qazi Nur Alam, a disciple of the saint Allah Bakhsh Taunsvi. He was raised as part of the Barelvi movement. Members of his family also participated in the Sufi movement.

== Ahl al-Qur'an ==
During his time in the Barelvi movement, Chakralawi began to develop Quranist views. His movement took hadith as relevant only to the human situation of prophet Muhammad, took only the injunctions of the Qur'an as compulsory, and rejected what it saw as the excessive emphasis that Ahl al-Hadith put on hadith.

Chakralawi began refining his beliefs in 1882. In 1900 and 1901, he began to denounce significant portions of the hadiths, which led to ostracization in 1902 and 1903. As Chakralawi continued to develop his views, he was denounced by hundreds of Ahl-i Hadith scholars from across India. Around this time, a fatwa was issued Muhammad Husayn Batalwi, although it did not call for his death, instead saying that only a Islamic government could punish the crime of apostasy.

In 1904, Chakralawi began publishing a journal called Ishaat ul-Quran.

As a result of his Quranist views, Chakralawi changed his name from Ghulam Nabi, which means slave of the Prophet, to Abdullah, which means the worshipper of Allah. He believed that his former name was polytheistic.

Ahl al-Qur'an has been described by Aziz Ahmad and Dietrich Reetz as a "fundamentalist splinter group of Ahl al-Hadith" while Francis Robinson has described it as puritanical. Chakralawi also opposed Sufism and vehemently condemned the shrine-based practices and Piri-Muridi traditions of the time.

Chakralawi established a mosque with the financial assistance of his disciple Shaykh Muhammad Chittu (d. 1911 CE) in Lahore.

In 1920, four years after Chakralawi's death, the Lahore High Court of Pakistan gave legitimacy to the Ahl al-Qur'an group as a Muslim sect.

== See also ==
- Islam in India
- Islam in Pakistan
- Islamic schools and branches
- Madhhab
