= Hassan al-Maliki =

Saudi Arabian Islamic scholar

Hassan Farhan al-Maliki

Personal life
- Born: 1970 (age 55–56) Jizan, Saudi Arabia
- Main interest(s): Tafsir, Arabic language
- Occupation: Religious reformist

Religious life
- Religion: Islam
- Website: https://almaliky.org/

Hassan Farhan al-Maliki (Arabic: حسن بن فرحان المالكي) is a Saudi religious reformist thinker who was arrested in September 2017 and put on trial in October 2018 by Saudi authorities. He was arrested for a host of reasons, namely his opinions about the veracity of certain sayings attributed to the Islamic prophet Muhammad, his criticism of several 7th century Islamic figures, "insulting the country's rulers and the Supreme Council of Religious Scholars, and describing them as extremist", accusing Gulf countries of supporting ISIS, praising Hezbollah's leader, Hassan Nasrallah, "having sympathy" for the Houthi group in Yemen, and crossing illegally from Saudi Arabia into northern Yemen for research about his family origins and history in 2001, after Saudi authorities had banned him from travel abroad.

== Career and arrest ==
Hassan al-Maliki, prior to his arrest, was a writer, researcher and Islamic historian. His views have been described as Quranist, moderate, tolerant, and one of opposition to the takfiri ideology. He had been arrested on numerous occasions and released, although this escalated by 2019 when Saudi prosecutors purportedly sought the death penalty against him. Saudi analysts had previously condemned him for his liberal and pro-reformation stance, particularly with regard to Wahhabism, sympathy for Houthis, criticism of several seventh century figures, and violating cybercrime law. The department which arrested him, the Specialised Criminal Court, was purportedly established to counter terrorism within the country.

Hassan was arrested in September 2017; charges were brought against him a year later in October 2018. Human Rights Watch criticized the arrest as being predicated on grounds that had "no resemblance to recognized crimes." Michael Page, a HRW director commenting on the case said "Mohammed bin Salman has consistently pledged to support a more 'moderate' version of Islam while his country maintains a prosecution service that seeks the death penalty against religious reformers for expressing their peaceful ideas". In all, the court indicted him on 14 different charges.

During a message he delivered from prison, Maliki said that he was arrested by Wahhabists and religious extremists with power, and he exonerated the Saudi government from involvement in his arrest. Reports on the religious affiliation of Hassan vary, with some describing him as a Maliki Sunni, while others describe him as a Quranist, i.e. an adherent of the ahl- al-Qur'an school of thought. Maliki, described as a Quran-centric scholar, has also stated that cognizant matters and those related to obedience are according to the Quranic-oriented stance, matters postponed for the hereafter, stating that the ahl al Quran stance dictates that divine worldly penal codes are limited to murder, corruption and aggression. He has also stated that 90% of highly circulated hadiths by ulama are inauthentic, and used the phrase followers of sahaba to describe Sunnism, followers of ahl al-bayt to describe Shi'ism and used the term "shi'at al-Qur'an" to describe adherents to Quran-centric faith.
