= Muhammad Tawfiq Sidqi =

Egyptian Islamic scholar (1881–1920)

Muhammad Tawfiq Sidqi (Arabic: محمد توفيق صدقي, romanized: Muḥammad Tawfīq Ṣidqī; 1881–1920) was an Egyptian Islamic scholar who argued against the authenticity of hadith. He is remembered today for his argument "that nothing of the hadith was recorded until after enough time had elapsed to allow the infiltration of numerous absurd or corrupt traditions"; and that God had allowed this to happen because the Sunnah of Muhammad as a whole "was only ever meant for the Arabs of the Prophet's time", as only the Quran was necessary for Islam, (a position held by a small number of Muslims and known as Quranism). Sidqi recanted his position after Rashid Rida opposed his position.

Sidqi was a hafiz who had memorized the Quran as a young boy, and "during the 1890s and early 1900s" had written articles in Egyptian journals defending Islam against Christian missionary criticisms of his religion. He was an "associate" or "protege" of the well-known Islamic revivalist Rashid Rida. He attended Qasr Al-Ayni Medical School, and worked as a physician at the prison of Turra. He died of typhus in 1920.

== Views on hadith ==
Sidqi described his motivation for questioning hadith as part of a rejection of taqlid (the unthinking and unjustified conformity of one person to the Islamic teachings of another) and the "quest for authenticity" in Islam. One hadith in particular that sparked his disenchantment was the "hadith of the fly" which had been rated sahih (sound) by Muhammad al-Bukhari and other famed scholars of hadith:

- 'If a fly lands in your drink, push it all the way, under, then throw the fly out and drink. On one of the fly's wings is disease, on the other is its cure.'

As a doctor he found it in conflict with modern medicine and the germ theory of disease.

Shortly after the turn of the twentieth century, Sidqi wrote an article titled al-Islam huwa ul-Qur'an Wahdahu ("Islam is the Qur'an Alone") that appeared in Rashid Rida's journal al-Manar. There he argued that the Quran is sufficient as guidance in Islam: "what is obligatory for man does not go beyond God's Book. ... If anything other than the Qur'an had been necessary for religion, ... the Prophet would have commanded its registration in writing, and God would have guaranteed its preservation." His article is said to have "sparked a debate in al-Manar that lasted four years". Refutations of his article included works by the scholars Ahmad Mansur al-Baz, Shaikh Taha al-Bishri, and a "long series of articles" by Indian scholar Shaikh Salih al-Yafiʿi.

Sidqi concluded that the Sunnah of Muhammad was "temporary and provisional law", not divine revelation (wahi) meant for all humanity. He offered several "proofs" why the Sunnah was "intended only for those who lived during the Prophet's era":

- that the Sunnah "was not written" down for safe keeping "during the time of the Prophet";
- the Companions of Muhammad "made no arrangement for the preservation of the Sunnah "whether in a book or in their memories";
- hadith were not transmitted from one generation to the next verbatim;
- the Sunnah was "not committed to memory" like the Quran so that "differences developed among different transmitters";
- if the Sunnah "had been meant for all people" this would not have happened and it "would have been carefully preserved and circulated as widely as possible";
- much of the Sunnah obviously only applies to "Arabs of Muhammad's time and is based on local customs and circumstances".
