= Mohammed Abu Zaid al-Damanhury =

20th century Al Azhar scholar

Mohammed Abu Zaid Al Damanhury was a 20th century Quranist scholar and Al-Azhar University graduate from Damanhur, Egypt who wrote a controversial commentary on the Quran.

In 1930, al-Damanhury published a rationalist commentary of the Quran titled Guidance and Wisdom from Interpretation of the Quran using the Quran (Al-hidaya wal-‘irfan fi tafsir al-Qur’an bil-Qur’an) In it, al-Damanhury used the Quran to interpret the Quran instead of using hadith-based commentaries. According to Ali Gomaa, he differed in opinion from traditional Sunni beliefs regarding the miracles of the prophets, inheritance in islam, the banning of alcohol, and the hijab.

The publication of his commentary caused a major controversy with traditionalist Al-Azhar scholars, and led to its confiscation by the police. Shaykh al-Azhar, Muhammad al-Ahmadi al-Zawahiri, noticed that other Azhari shaykhs were distributing al-Damahury's commentary among their students. Alarmed, he proceeded to have the book suppressed. In a 75-page report by senior Al-Azhar scholars, al-Damanhury and his commentary was criticized in the severest of tones. He was also severely criticized by Rashid Rida, who accused al-Damanhury of being a kafir and a mulhid. A group of Sunni shaykhs from his native city, Damanhur, also took him to court to have him declared an apostate and have his marriage annulled. However, the Cairo Court of Appeals ruled in al-Damanhury's favor. After his successful appeal, nothing more was heard from al-Damanhury.
