= 1980 Kano riot =

Religious uprising in Kano, Nigeria

Kano 1980 riot
- Part of Yan Tatsine uprising
- Date: 18–29 December 1980
- Location: Kano, Nigeria; 11.992°N 8.538°E
- Deaths: ~4,500 (based on mortuary estimates)

The Kano 1980 riot was a riot in Kano, Nigeria led by Maitatsine and his followers and the first major religious conflict in postcolonial Kano.

Over 4,177 civilians, 100 policemen and about 35 military personnel were killed, including Maitatsine himself, and is generally regarded as marking the beginning of the Yan Tatsine insurgency. Because of this, there was widespread impression that Nigeria's security and economy was threatened by illegal aliens and this belief was fueled by the fact that other West African nationals had aided in armed robberies. Illegal immigrants from Niger, Chad, Cameroon, Mali and Burkina Faso along with over 6,000 Nigerian Muslim fanatics killed over 100 policemen while injuring 100 policemen. The army was called and alleviated the situation before the fanatics could overrun the country. However, official sources state that illegal aliens did not cause the trouble.

== Aftermath ==
When President Shehu Shagari called for all the foreigners to leave Nigeria, it created the worst international crisis since the end of the civil war in January 1970 and implemented a search of commercial, industrial and residential buildings to ensure their departure which caused tension with neighboring countries and international allies. The United States State Department described Nigeria's actions as "shocking and violation of every imaginable human right". The European Economic Community also criticized it and Pope John Paul II called it "a grave, incredible drama producing the largest single, and worst human exodus in the 20th century". British politician Michael Foot sent a letter to the Nigerian High Commissioner in London, citing "an act of heartlessness, and a failure of common humanity". British newspapers also commented with The Guardian saying it was "inhumanity, high-handedness and irresponsibility." Prime Minister of South Africa P. W. Botha also criticized Shagari in the situation, comparing him to Adolf Hitler and other white right-wing groups said it was worse than apartheid in South Africa.

French media such as the Jeune Afrique ran a front-page story titled "La Honte" (The Shame), saying the situation was "an act of barbarism unparalleled in the world" while Ghana newspaper Ghanaian Times said it was an "electoral gimmick" by the National Party of Nigeria-controlled government to deflect attention from its failures so it could win the 1983 election and also said the illegal alien expulsion was "create mass hysteria by infiltrating Sudan-trained mercenaries into Ghana to subvert the Ghanaian Government". Ghanaian politician Jerry Rawlings claimed that it was a "calculated plot" against the Ghanaian government.
