= Kala Kato =

Quranist movement

Kala Kato is a Quranist movement whose adherents reside mostly in northern Nigeria, with some adherents residing in Niger. Kala Kato means a "man says" in the Hausa language, in reference to the sayings, or hadiths, posthumously attributed to the Islamic prophet Muhammad. Kala Kato accepts only the Quran as authoritative and believe that anything that is not Kala Allah, which means what "God says" in the Hausa language, is Kala Kato.

== Overview ==
Based on their tafsir on Quranic verses like 6:114-115, 18:54, 45:2-6, 56:77-81, and 77:50, Kala Kato rejects the authority of hadiths posthumously attributed to Muhammad and consider only the Quran to be authoritative. One of Kala Kato's leaders from Zaria, Mallam Isiyaka Salisu, says that the mission of the group is to sensitize the Muslim Umma to know that the only way to worship Allah is through the injunctions of the Holy Qur’an.

Other distinct practices of Kala Kato include not eating frozen fish that is not Islamically slaughtered, not using ritual baths, and not saying funeral prayers or putting a shroud on their dead. They are also distinguished from their Sunni counterparts by their practice of Salah. Sunni scholars Aminu Alhaji Bala and Ibrahim Shu'aibu Sa'idu say that some, following Mallam Saleh Idris of Kano, do only one Rakat and say duas rather than recite any Suras from the Quran. They also go directly from Qiyam to Sajdah without doing Ruku. Others, following Mallam Usman Dangungu, Mallam Musa Ibbi, and Mallam Alhasan Lamido of Kaduna, do more than one Rakat and recite Suras from the Quran. They also do Ruku in between Qiyam and Sajdah.

Kala Kato adherents are sometimes mistaken for other Quranists in northern Nigeria who are more educated, affluent, urban, and influenced by the ideas of the late High Court Judge Isa Othman of Maiduguri, who in turn was influenced by the ideas of Rashad Khalifa. These other Quranists are found in most cities in northern Nigeria and have their own mosque in Kaduna.

In Nigeria, Sunni leaders have urged the government to suppress Kala Kato, who have been described as militant.
