= Musa Makaniki =

Musa Ali Suleiman (a.k.a. Musa Makaniki) is a Nigerian.

A close disciple of Maitatsine, he emerged as a leader and successor after his death.

Despite Mohammed Marwa's death, Yan Tatsine riots continued into the early 1980s. In October 1982, riots erupted in Bulumkuttu, near Maiduguri, and in Kaduna, to where many Yan Tatsine adherents had moved after 1980. Over 3,000 people died. Some survivors of these altercations moved to Yola, and in early 1984 more violent uprisings occurred in that city. It was in this round of rioting that Makaniki emerged as a leader and Marwa's successor. Ultimately more than 1,000 people died in Yola and roughly half of the city's 60,000 inhabitants were left homeless. Makaniki fled to his hometown of Gombe, where more Yan Tatsine riots occurred in April 1985.

After the deaths of several hundred people Makaniki retreated to Cameroon, where he remained until 2004. He was arrested on returning to Nigeria, where he was sentenced in 2006, but later acquitted on appeal.
