= Muhammad Shahrur =

Syrian Islamic scholar (1938–2019)

- Born: April 11, 1938; Damascus, Mandatory Syrian Republic
- Died: December 21, 2019 (aged 81); Abu Dhabi, United Arab Emirates
- Known for: Quranist studies

Muhammad Shahrour (Arabic: محمد شحرور, 11 April 1938 – 21 December 2019) was a Syrian philosopher and author. He was an Emeritus Professor of Civil Engineering at the University of Damascus who wrote extensively about Islam. Shahrour was trained as an engineer in Syria, the former Soviet Union and Ireland. He referred to the book of the Islamic prophet Muhammad as "The Book", not the Quran; which casts him in direct contradiction with other Islamic thinkers and traditional scholars. Yet similar to Quranist Muslims, he did not consider Hadith as a divine source; however, he did not belong to the same school as Ahmed Subhy Mansour.

== Early life ==
Born in Damascus, Shahrour had his high school diploma in 1958, then he studied Civil engineering at the Moscow State University, Soviet Union until 1964. Afterwards, he went back to Syria to work as a research assistant for the Damascus University. Later on, he had Master's and PhD degrees, in 1968 and 1972 respectively, from Trinity College Dublin.

== Positions ==
Shahrour decided to write his first book, which took him more than twenty years to complete, after the Arab defeat in the 1967 Six Day War that was a collective shock for the Arab world. This led Shahrour to search for a way out of the region's crisis, which he interpreted above all as a moral and intellectual crisis.

Shahrour said that traditional scholarship on the Qur'an is unscientific. His interpretation of the Quran supports liberal political positions such as pluralism. He also said that the Quran must be read and understood in relation to ever changing social realities. Shahrour said that "jurisprudence in the name of God is a farce benefiting only those wanting to maintain political power", thus opposing diametrically the views of both Islamists and of the Ulama, the traditional legal Islamic scholars. According to Shahrour, Islam makes no laws, but sets limits (Hudud) within which man enjoys "the greatest possible degree of freedom". The traditional interpretation of Hudud in Islamic law or Sharia is a class of punishments that are fixed for certain crimes. However, according to Shahrur, the chopping off of a hand is not the punishment for theft, the punishment is cutting the thief from the community. A judge could sentence the guilty party to jail, or for example, volunteer work instead. Shahrur possibly took this idea about the upper and lower limits of punishment from the Lebanese scholar ʿAbdallāh al-ʿAlāyilī (1914–1996), with whom he was personally acquainted and who had published this idea in his book Ayn al-khatāʾ? (1978, "Where is the mistake").

== Death ==
Shahrour died on 21 December 2019 in Abu Dhabi, UAE. However, his body was taken to Damascus to be buried there.

== Publications ==
Books by Muhammad Shahrour:

in Arabic:

- AI-Kitab wa 'l-Qur 'an: Qira 'a Mu 'asira (الكتاب والقرآن : قراءة معاصرة) - The Book and The Qur'an: A Contemporary Reading (1990)
- Dirasat al-Islamiyya al-Mu'asira fi 'l-Dawla wa '1-Mujtama'a (الدراسات الإسلامية المعاصرة على الدولة والمجتمع) - Contemporary Islamic Studies on State and Society (1994)
- Al- Islam wa al-Iman (الإسلام والإيمان - منظومة القيم ) - Islam and Belief - A System and Values (1996)
- Naho ossol jadida lil Fiqeh Al Islami - Fiqeh wa al Maraa (نحو أصول جديدة للفقه الإسلامي – فقه المرأة ) - Towards New Roots of Islamic Jurisprudence - Jurisprudence & Women,(2001)
- Tajfif manabea al-irhab (تجفيف منابع الإرهاب) - Drying the Sources of Terrorism (2008)
- Quranic stories - a modern reading - Volume I: Introduction to the stories and the story of Adam (2010) (القصص القرآني – قراءة معاصرة -المجلد الأول: مدخل إلى القصص وقصة آدم)
- Quranic stories - a modern reading - Volume II: From Noah to Josef (2011) (القصص القرآني – قراءة معاصرةالجزء الثاني – من نوح إلى يوسف)

In English:

- The Qur'an, Morality and Critical Reason - The Essential Muhammad Shahrur (2009), selected writings with an introduction from and translated by Andreas Christmann and an interview between Shahrour and Dale F. Eickelman

== Reactions ==
Shahrour's first book has circulated throughout the Middle East and North Africa. His second and third books have been banned in many countries, but thousands of copies have been published, sold, and circulated under the table. At least thirteen books have been published attacking Shahrour's first book.

Shahrour and a dozen or so like-minded intellectuals from across the Arab and Islamic worlds provoked bedlam when they presented their call for a reinterpretation of holy texts after a Cairo seminar entitled "Islam and Reform" in 2004. His thoughts have angered many traditional scholars in Al-Azhar University and has been declared apostate by two of them, Mustafa Al-Shak'a and Farahat Al-Sayeed Al-Mungi. When Sheikh Yusuf Al-Qaradawi, the influential Islamic thinker and frequent guest on Al-Jazeera, was asked about the significance of Shahrur's work for the Islamic world, he said: "It's a new religion!"

== Notable quote ==
“It is easier to build a skyscraper or a tunnel under the sea than to teach people how to read the book of the Lord with their own eyes. They have been used to reading this book with borrowed eyes for hundreds of years”.
