= Maitatsine =

Controversial Islamic preacher in Nigeria

Muhammad Marwa (died 1980), best known by his nickname Maitatsine, was a controversial Muslim preacher in Nigeria who founded the Yan Tatsine, a militant Quranist movement that first appeared around the early 1970s. Maitatsine is a Hausa word meaning "the one who damns" and refers to his curse-laden public speeches against the Nigerian state. He was responsible for the 1980 Kano riot, in which over 4,177 civilians, 100 policemen and about 35 military personnel were killed, including Maitatsine himself.

== Background ==
He was originally from Marwa in northern Cameroon. After his education, he moved to Kano, Nigeria in about 1945, where he became known for his controversial preachings on the Qur'an. Maitatsine spoke against the use of radios, watches, bicycles, cars and the possession of more money than necessary.

The British colonial authorities sent him into exile, but he returned to Kano shortly after independence. By 1972, he had a notable and increasingly militant following known as Yan Tatsine. In 1975, he was again arrested by Nigerian police for slander and public abuse of political authorities But in that period he began to receive acceptance from religious authorities, especially after making hajj, the Muslim pilgrimage to Mecca. As his following increased in the 1970s, so did the number of confrontations between his adherents and the police. His preaching attracted largely a following of youths, unemployed migrants, and those who felt that mainstream Muslim teachers were not doing enough for their communities. By December 1980, continued Yan Tatsine attacks on other religious figures and police forced the Nigerian army to become involved. Subsequent armed clashes led to the deaths of around 5,000 people, including Maitatsine himself. Maitatsine died shortly after sustaining injuries in the clashes either from his wounds or from a heart attack.

According to a 2010 article published by the Sunday Trust magazine, the Nigerian military cremated Maitatsine's remains, which now rest in a bottle kept at a police laboratory in Kano.

== Legacy ==
Despite Mohammad Marwa's death, Yan Tatsine riots continued into the early 1980s. In October 1982 riots erupted in Bulumkutu, near Maiduguri, and in Kaduna, to where many Yan Tatsine adherents had moved after 1980. Over 3,000 people died. Some survivors of these altercations moved to Yola, and in early 1984 more violent uprisings occurred in that city. In this round of rioting, Musa Makaniki, a close disciple of Maitatsine, emerged as a leader and Marwa's successor. Ultimately, more than 1,000 people died in Yola and roughly half of the city's 60,000 inhabitants were left homeless. Makaniki fled to his hometown of Gombe, where more Yan Tatsine riots occurred in April 1985. After the deaths of several hundred people Makaniki retreated to Cameroon, where he remained until 2004 when he was arrested in Nigeria.

Some analysts view the terrorist group Boko Haram as an extension of the Maitatsine riots.

== See also ==
- Boko Haram
- Religious violence in Nigeria
- Islam in Nigeria

== Literature ==
- Allan Christelow, Abdalla Uba Adamu: Art. "Mai Tatsine" in John L. Esposito (ed.): The Oxford Encyclopedia of the Islamic World. 6 Bde. Oxford 2009. Bd. III, S. 459-462.
