= Salisu Matori =

Nigerian politician

Salisu Ibrahim Musa Matori

Senator of the Federal Republic of Nigeria from Bauchi State South District
- In office May 1999 – May 2003
- Succeeded by: Abubakar Maikafi

Personal details
- Born: Bauchi State, Nigeria
- Party: People's Democratic Party

Salisu Ibrahim Musa Matori was elected Senator for the Bauchi South constituency of Bauchi State, Nigeria at the start of the Nigerian Fourth Republic, running on the People's Democratic Party (PDP) platform. He took office on 29 May 1999.

After taking his seat in the Senate in June 1999, Matori was appointed to committees on Transport (chairman), Women Affairs, Agriculture, Finance & Appropriation, Education and Tourism & Culture. In August 2000, he was named in a report issued by a panel headed by Senator Idris Kuta that had investigated financial irregularities in Senate contracts. Senator Matori was alleged to have overcharged for insurance coverage of National Assembly vehicles, but was later exonerated of all wrongdoings after due investigation by the panel. In the run-up to the 2003 elections he became Chairman of the Abubakar Rimi Campaign Organization. In February 2003 he defected to the All Nigeria People's Party (ANPP).

In 2010 Matori was a member of the Planning and Strategy Committee set up by Northern leaders to make sure that a northerner was elected in the 2011 presidential elections rather than incumbent President Goodluck Jonathan, who is from the south.
