= Idi Othman Guda =

Nigerian politician

Idi Othman Guda (August 1945 – January 2015) was a senator in the Fourth Federal Republic of Nigeria (1999 to 2003). He held the offices of Deputy-Chairman Senate Committee on Sports and Youth Development, Chairman Senate Committee on Environment, Member Senate Committee on Rules and Procedure, Education, Power & Steel, Senate Services. He was elected for Bauchi Central Constituency of Bauchi State as a Member of the People's Democratic Party.
