= Mustafa İslamoğlu =

Turkish author and writer (born 1960)

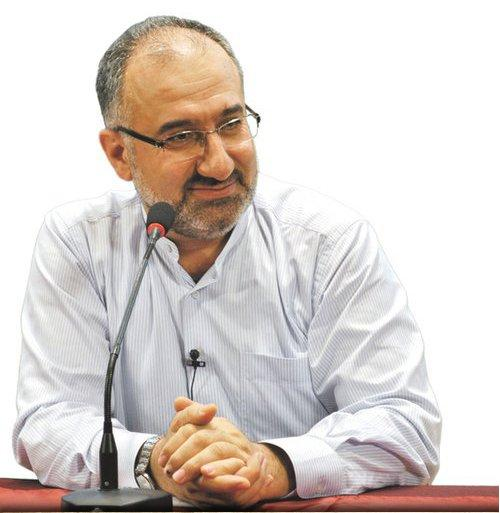

Personal life
- Born: 28 October 1960 (age 65) Develi, Kayseri, Turkey
- Main interest(s): Fiqh, Tafsir, Hadith
- Notable works: İmamlar ve Sultanlar (1990); Yürek Devleti (1990); Kadının Özgürlüğü (1990); Yahudileşme Temayülü (1994); Hayat Kitabı Kur’an (2008); İslam Nedir (2014)
- Education: Erciyes University; Al-Azhar University
- Website: mustafaislamoglu.com

Religious life
- Religion: Islam
- Denomination: Explaining Islam in the light of the Qur'an

Muslim leader
- Influenced by: Safinaz Kazem, Ignác Goldziher

Mustafa İslamoğlu (born 28 October 1960, in Develi, Kayseri), is a Turkish theologian, poet, writer. He also appears in religious shows of Diyanet TV.

He has studies and books about various topics such as literature, Islamic history, tafsir. He was criticised in Turkey for his ideas that promoted logic and science above tradition and denying the authority of certain hadith, which he saw to be fabricated. He argued that the use of hadith should be limited, applied only on topics that are already mentioned in the Qur'an but not in detail.
