= The Caliphate or the Supreme Imamate (book) =

Islamic political treatise by Sayyid Rashid Rida (1923)

The Caliphate or the Grand Imamate
- Author: Sāyyīd Rāshīd Rīdā
- Original title: الخلافة أو الإمامة العظمى (Al-Khilafa aw al-Imama al-ʿUzma)
- Language: Arabic
- Subject: Islamic State, Islamic Khilafa and Islamism
- Publication date: 1923
- Publication place: Egypt

Al-Khilafa aw al-Imama al-ʿUzma (transl. The Caliphate or the Supreme Imamate; Arabic: الخلافة أو الإمامة العظمى) is an Islamic political treatise published by Syro-Egyptian Salafi Islamist theologian Rashid Rida in 1923. The book initially had appeared as a series of articles in Rida's Al-Manar Islamic magazine throughout the winter of 1922–23 during the tumultuous events of the abolition of Ottoman Sultanate. The book became the first substantial Islamic scholarly treatise of the 20th century which elucidated the theological basis of a Khilafah and advocated the religious obligation of establishing a pan-Islamic supra-state. The treatise gave an in-depth explanation of the governance and working of the Caliphate system through precedents from Islamic history and decried the newly emerging trends that downplayed the orthodox Sunni doctrines on Caliphate; and equated the absence of Islamic state with the era of Jahiliyya (pre-Islamic ignorance). Rida produced the theoretical framework for an international Islamic order that enforced Sharia (Islamic laws), cementing his scholarly status as "the founding theoretician" for Islamist and Jihadist movements of the contemporary era.

In the book, Rida postulated that the Islamic State should ideally be headed by a Mujtahid. The Caliph should enforce the laws of the Islamic Imamate/Caliphate based upon Quran, Hadith and the precedents from the four Rashidun Caliphs. Qualified Ulama (Islamic scholars) have the responsibility to aid the government in this task, with the power to constantly evaluate and correct the Caliph and are obliged to act as the moral guardians of the Islamic order. So long as the elected Caliph rules in accordance with Islamic principles and justice, all Muslims are obliged to obey and unite behind him. The establishment of the ideal Caliphate was outlined as a deep-rooted visionary programme. In the absence of the ideal Caliphate, Muslims are obliged to form a "caliphate of necessity", an Islamic state that didn't satisfy the above stipulations.

The treatise would have a profound influence on Islamic scholarly circles and sparked a revolutionary variant of pan-Islamist activism that opposed all forms of Western social, political and cultural influences. Inspired by the programme of the treatise, Islamists all across the world began totally rejecting all Western political theories and emphasise beliefs in the inherent superiority of Islamic system. Rida's Caliphate doctrine would directly influence ideologues of the Muslim Brotherhood, South Asian Jamaat e-Islami and Saudi Arabian Sahwa movement.

== Purpose of the Book ==
In November 1922, Kemalist-led Turkish national Assembly abolished the Ottoman Sultanate. Despite being a strong critic of Sultan Mehmed VI for his co-operation with the Allied forces during their occupation of Istanbul, Rashid Rida fiercely contested the move and declared that the Turkish War of Independence was an Islamic cause to liberate Turkey from European colonial powers and restore an Islamic state. Rida denounced the Turkish government for downplaying the position of Caliph to the spiritual realm; similar to the Catholic Papacy. For Rida, Caliphate in Islam represented a political-religious leadership that enforced sharia (Islamic law), united Muslims under the banner of Tawhid and waged Jihad against threats from disbelievers. Rida penned the book during the tumultuous events of the Turkish War of Independence in the 1920s with the aim of rebutting Kemalists and enjoining Turks to uphold the Caliphal system. Introducing the treatise as a “gift for the Turkish people", Rida explained the importance of the Caliphate, the obligation to implement Islamic laws and maintenance of Islamic Unity. Asserting that Islam is "the most powerful moral force on Earth”, Rida argued that only a powerful, self-sufficient Islamic civilisation can constitute a successful alternative to the emerging Western-led political order. He urged the Turkish people to wage Jihad against the colonial powers to rejuvenate the Islamic Caliphate and thereby maintain brotherly ties with Arabs; by virtue of allegiance to the Khalifa. Despite this, Rashid Rida held deep reservations of the Turks; since he considered them to be ignorant of Islamic religious sciences and its intricacies for facilitating a viable application of Islamic political system in the modern era.

Rashid Rida condemned the decision of Kemalist-led Turkish National Assembly to abolish the Sultanate in November 1922 as part of the ideological assault by "Westernised apostates" against Islam and its symbols. Explaining his motives behind the publication of the work on the wake of the Turkish abolition of Sultanate, Rashid Rida writes:

This matter [i.e Khilafah] was dormant and the sudden events of these days awakened them when the Turks brought down the Ottoman House and established on its debris a republican state in a new form, ... however, they have named one of the members of the family of the previous sultans as a ‘spiritual caliph’ for all Muslims, and they have restricted this khilafah to this family… many newspapers have plunged into the matter of the khilafah and its rulings, and there has been much confusion and stampeding in the matter, and the truth has been enshrouded in falsehood; so, we saw it as incumbent upon ourselves to clarify the rulings of our shari'ah in regard to it in detail that which is dictated by the station in order that truth be known from the false."

— - Muhammad Rashid Rida, in al-Khilafah aw al-Imamah al-'Uzma,

== Turkish Rebuttal ==
The Turkish government rebutted Rida's treatise with their own book "The Caliphate and the Sovereignty of the People"; supported by activists and intellectuals who restricted the mission of the Caliphate to the first generation alone. Turkish nationalists held the Caliphate to be a titular office with no executive power; since there was no way to prevent the despotism of the Khalifa. In their view, a Caliphate that fulfills all the legal conditions was the best form of government for mankind; but all the "caliphates" that succeeded the first generation were only monarchs who held a "superficial" Caliphate with no valid political authority. Hence, justifying through historical precedents and invoking the juristic principles to avoid harm; they argued for separating temporal powers from the current tyrannical and false Caliphates. For the Kemalists, the Caliphate was a symbol of despotism and backwardness. Rida refuted the Turkish counter-arguments; by maintaining that real and superficial caliphates had no divergence on political level. Reiterating classical Sunni doctrines; he stipulated that Caliphs who came to power through force must be obeyed to preserve Muslim unity. Rather than any utilitarian purposes, Caliphate was "the leadership of the Islamic government" tasked with the duty to enforce Sharia, uphold justice and wage Jihad to defend the Islamic faith and the domains of Dar al-Islam. More importantly, the obligation to establish the Caliphate was laid down clearly by the Divine Law; therefore making it forbidden "to abolish it or replace it". He also mocked Turkish nationalist reasoning over precedents to Islamic history; since history was rife with examples of heresies, oppression and polytheism.

Referring back to the works of classical theologians such as Ibn Taymiyya and Mawardi, Rida transmitted 'Ijma (scholarly consensus) on the necessity of the Caliphate, writing:

The pious ancestors (salaf) of the ummah were in consensus, and the Sunnis, as well as the masses of the other sects that the position of the imam – that is, the appointing him as trustee over the ummah, is obligatory for Muslims according to the shari'ah... the position of the caliph is a fard kifayah (an obligation contingent upon sufficiency) and that those who are obliged to fill it are the ahl al-hal wa al-'aqd in the ummah"

— Sayyid Rashid Rida, in "al-Khilafah aw al-Imamah al-'Uzma",

== Qualifications of the Caliph/Imam ==
The first section of the book was a detailed examination on the need and urgency of the Caliphate. Bringing citations from hadith literature and works of Sunni Fuqaha like Al-Mawardi and to back up his premise, Rida asserted that the absence of Caliphate and Islamic rule was equivalent to the state of Jahiliyya (pre-Islamic pagan ignorance). Reiterating the standard prerequisites in classical Sunni doctrine on the election of the caliph, Rida stressed the Caliph caliph should be a mujtahid and from the Quraysh tribe. He advocated the principle of Arab virtue and pre-eminence, arguing that Islam attained its glory under Arab leadership and hence, Imamate (leadership) should once again return to the Arabs. Rida further identified as Hejaz and Arabian Peninsula as sacred lands where practice of all religions other than Islam have to be banished. The degeneration of Caliphate system after the Four Rightly Guided Caliphs was blamed by Rida on the actions of first Umayyad Caliph Mu'awiya I. These included abandonment of the shura system of electing a caliph in favour of dynastic succession; and introduction of the asabiyya of Umayyads.

While Rida stressed the importance of electing a Caliph who met all of the shar’i stipulations, he also wrote that the absence of these ideal conditions did not imply the discontinuity of the Caliphate in no ambiguous terms:

“the ‘ulama agreed that it is not permissible to swear the bay’ah for the khilafah to any except one who combines (in his person) what they mentioned of requisite qualifications, especially justice, and competence, and his being Quraysh; but, if some of the requisite conditions are not present, then the matter enters into the rule of necessities, and the necessities dictate according to their measure that it is obligatory in that instance to swear the bay’ah to him who gathers together most of the requisite qualifications ...”

— Sayyid Rashid Rida, "al-Khilafah aw al-Imamah al-'Uzma"

== Types of Caliphate/Imamate ==
Rida classified caliphates into 3 categories.

- "the ideal caliphate", that had prevailed during the era of the Rashidun Khilfah and the Umayyad Caliph Umar the Second, popularly known as "the fifth of the Rashiduin" for his religious fervour and righteousness. This type of Caliphate met all the shar'i stipulations.
- "the caliphate or imamate of necessity" This category of Caliphs were those elected by the ahl al-hall wa'l 'aqd (Islamic representatives) but didn't satisfy all the religious requirements. The Caliphate of necessity was characterised by dearth of religious knowledge amongst their rulers and defective application of Islamic justice in its governance system. Rida classified many Umayyad and Abbasid caliphs under this category for their lack of religious qualifications to undertake the task of Ijtihad.
- "the caliphate of tyranny or conquest (al-taghallub bi'l quwwa)" This type of Caliphate is the one in which rulers attain and maintain power through raw force without heeding the consultation from ahl al-hall wa'l 'aqd. Rida classified most of the later non-Arab caliphates such the Ottoman Empire under this category. Rida called for the toppling such Caliphates whenever Muslims attain the necessary strength for a successful revolution.

Rida designated the latter two categories of Caliphates as “Khilafat al-Idtirar (Compulsory Caliphate)”. Differentiating between them, Rida writes:

"the difference between this khilafah – the familiar khilafah of ‘domination’ and what came before it when both of them being permissible due to necessity is that the first issues from the ahl al-hal wa al-aqd by their choice of one who represents those who have lost some of the requisite conditions… whereas the second is an assailant of the khilafah by force of tribalism, not by the choice of the ahl al-hal wa al-‘aqd …”

— Muhammad Rashid Rida, al-Khilafah aw al-Imamah al-'Uzma

Rashid Rida called for the creation of the "Ideal Caliphate" modelled after the Rashidun Caliphates; envisioning it as an Islamic state established through on consultation with Islamic representatives. The contemporary Ottoman Sultanate was dercried as a form of feudal model. At the same, Rida recognised the hardships for electing an Ideal Caliph and envisioned its rejuvenation as a long-term strategy. In the immediate term, Rida argued, Muslims should strive to establish an "Islamic state" which would be the "Imamate of Necessity/Actual Caliphate". "Actual Caliphate/Imamate" is a necessary stage that is required to defend the unity of Muslims and prevent anarchy. Nevertheless, even this Islamic state would not be tyrannical. Rather, the Islamic-state of necessity would also uphold social justice and root out exploitation, based on Islamic injunctions. The rulers are to be assisted in this duty by the righteous ulema, who act as the moral guardians of civilization and check the excesses of the ruler according to the Shari'ah. Rashid Rida described this intermediary socio-political system under a variety of terms, such as “Islamic government”, “Islamic Caliphate”, “Government of Caliphate”, etc.

== Governance ==
In the second section of the book, Rashid Rida explained about the Caliphal apparatus and the procedure for conducting an advanced and efficient governance. Rida stressed three significant religious and temporal themes which became the hallmark of Arab salafiyya movement: establishment of Islamic government based on shura (consultation), the urgency of a rejuvanted caliphate under Arab leadership, and safeguarding Islamic state-hood. The process of shura (consultation) to choose the caliph and assist him in governance was to be done by prominent Muslim representative known as the Ahl al-hall wal 'Aqd. Its members not only consisted of revered Islamic scholars, clerics, theologians and jurisconsultants, but also successful Muslim individuals in fields as diverse as literature, academia, engineering, business, industries, military, science and technology, etc.

Although the Ahl al-Hal wal Aqd were qualified to evaluate the decisions of the rulers; major decisions concerning state policies and ideological stances; they are bound to defer to the counsel of senior scholars known as the Mujtahids so that they are compatible with sharia. The principle of shura constituted a core feature of the Islamic state since it constituted a balancing mechanism between the authorities and their subjects and ensured the justice and upheld the sanctity of Muslims. To guard against corruptions from undermining the shura system; Rida argued for the dominant role of upright, qualified ulema in the Ahl al-hal wal Aqd, who act as "the natural and genuine representatives of Muslims."

The process of legislation and passing rules and regulations were to be based on Qur'an and Sunnah. In the absence of clear textual sources from the Scriptures (i.e. Qur'an and authentic hadith), the ulema should exercise Ijtihad based on the principles of Islamic jurisprudence to determine legislative rulings. Thus, the power of a ruler was restricted within the following boundaries set by Sharia:

"He [the caliph] is limited by the prescriptions of the Qur'an and the sunna, by the general example of the Rashidun caliphs, and by consultation."

== Programme of the Caliphate ==
Rida's proposed caliphate advocated the core themes of the Arab salafiyya movement and would implement Salafist doctrines in its territories. The elected Khalifa would be the supreme head; whose role was to govern by supervising the application of Islamic laws (Sharia). This was to happen through co-operation between the Mujtahid ulema (legal experts) and the ‘‘true caliph"; who engage in Ijtihad by evaluating the Scriptures and govern through shura (consultation). This procedure would strengthen the Caliphate, making it immune to corrupting foreign influences. Thus the Khilafa shall become a revolutionary vehicle for Islamic renaissance, revitalise the Islamic civilization, restore the political, economic and cultural sovereignty of the Islamic World, and rid Muslims off the polytheistic influences of Sufism. Rida identified two major internal enemies to his revolutionary project of Islamic Renaissance: "hizb al-mutafarnijin (the Europeanized party)", the modernists who borrowed heavily from Western ideological discourse, and "hizb hashawiyyat al-fuqaha' al-jdmidin (the party of the "reactionary jurists)", represented by the old-school Sufi clergy who clung onto the outdated works of the four mad'habs and refused to research the Scriptures or participate in Ijtihad. Islamic Renaissance was to be spearheaded by "hizb al-islah al-islami al-mu'tadil (moderate party of Islamic reform)", an avant-guard class of Salafist scholars who integrated their Islamic knowledge, scientific temperament and technical skills to address the rising challenges of the tumultuous inter War Islamic World.

The Salafiyya movement regarded the West as a primary nemesis; perceiving it's assault on Islam as political, cultural and ideological. While advocating Islamic reforms like cleansing folk Sufism and superstitions, the movement also emphasised the socio-political, cultural and ideological confrontation with the West; attacking the emerging heretical Western ideas and ridding "the seeds of Western decadence".

Envisioning the Islamic Caliphate as a critical institution needed for preserving Islamic unity and championing Islamic Renaissance, Rida writes:

'The Islamic world is in a state of anguish over the matter of its religion and the rulings of its shari’ah; subject to the whims of its rulers of different religions and confessions, the opinions of its ‘ulama, the guides of different madhahib and schools of thought, and the control of its enemies in religion and the world; and it does not have a source of agreed-upon general guidance to which to resort in that of which it is ignorant. Whenever there appears within it a reformer who castigates the people of whim, the corruptors rush to confront him and cast aspersions upon his religion and his knowledge; there is no cure for these corrupting factors and deviations except the revival of the position of the imamah, and the establishing the rightful imam…'

— Muhammad Rashid Rida, in al-Khilafah aw al-Imamah al-'Uzma,

== Legacy ==
"Al-Khilafa Aw al-Imama al-‘Uzma" became one of the most significant scholarly references for the ensuant ideologues of Islamism and Jihadism in their quest for rejuvenating the Khilafah system. The book ushered in a “conceptual revolution” which rejected all religious arguments for accepting the nascent nation-state paradigm and advocated the continuity of the traditional Islamic political order. Rida emphasised the classical methodology of electing the Imam, pledging bay’ah to the Khalifa and composition of the Ahl al-Hall wal-‘Aqd. By linking the ideas from the political treatises of Ibn Taymiyya, Mawardi, and other medieval jurisconsultants to the contemporary era; Rashid Rida revived the once-dormant subject of “Islamic legal politics” into the heart of religious discourse. The work championed the continuity of classical Sunni political doctrines over contemporary modernist and nationalist arguments for modern political ideas. Rida was one of the last major scholars to publish an originalist scholarly thesis on Khilafah; and later ideologues would use his work as a reference point; giving birth to a variety of Islamist movements.

== Criticism ==
Rida's modernist detractors have accused him of shutting down the historical evolution of Islamic political discourse and taking it back to the narrow confines of creedal rigidity and close-mindedness. Another critique was that despite his calls for Ijtihad, Rida didn't expand the Islamic political theory pragmatically for the complexities of the modern age. Critics argue that Rida's treatise is mostly a blind reformulation of the political ideas espoused by medieval jurisconsultants like Ibn Taymiyya, Ibn Qayyim, al-Mawardi, al-Ghazali, etc.

Other authors have criticised Rida as misappropriating the works of classical jurists without taking into account their historical context. Moroccan philosopher Abdelilah Belkeziz writes:

“Rashid Rida does not contribute anything new as regards a definition in specifying the necessity of the Imamah ... the difference between him and between his predecessors among the Fuqaha of the Khilafah, such as al-Mawardi, al-Ghazali, Ibn Taymiyyah or Ibn al-Qayyim al-Jawzi is that these discussed an extant imamah: an imamah of reality... Rashid Rida however, directed his discussion towards an imamah and a khilafah and towards preaching about a position that had no existence in reality – given that he did not consider it permissible to account the Ottoman khilafah as being among that which deserved the term or was representative of it! Thus, the discourse of al-Mawardi – and whoever took the same position among the fuqaha – was ‘positivist’ and based on an extant reality, whereas the discourse of Rashid Rida remained somehow normative and propagandist… his conceptual relation to that [of] khilafah was incompatible and not identifiable with the relation of the fuqaha of Islamic legal politics of the Islamic Middle Ages to the khilafah of that period.”

== See also ==
- Sayyid Rashid Rida
- Abolition of the Ottoman Sultanate
