= Rashid Rida =

Salafi reformist scholar and theologian (1865–1935)

Sayyid Muhammad Rashid Rida Al-Hussaini
- سيد محمد رشید رضا الحسيني
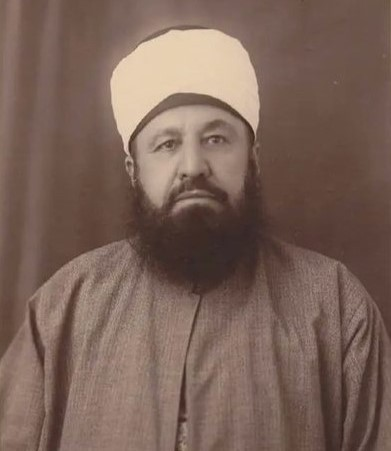
- Sayyid Muhammad Rashid Rida Al-Hussaini
- Title: Allamah; Shaykh al-Islam; Imam

Personal life
- Born: Sayyid Muḥammad Rashīd ibn ʿAlī Riḍā ibn Muḥammad Shams al-Dīn ibn Muḥammad Bahāʾ al-Dīn ibn Munlā ʿAlī Khalīfa Al-Hussaini; 23 September 1865 or 17 October 1865 Al-Qalamoun, Beirut Vilayet, Ottoman Empire (present-day Lebanon)
- Died: 22 August 1935 (aged 69) Cairo, Egypt
- Cause of death: Heart attack
- Resting place: Cairo, Egypt
- Era: 19th to early 20th century
- Region: Middle East
- Other name: Muhammad Rashid Rida
- Occupation: Mufti, Mufassir, Faqīh, Muhaddith

Religious life
- Religion: Islam
- Denomination: Sunni
- Jurisprudence: Shafiʽi Ijtihad
- Creed: Athari
- Movement: Modernism (initially); Salafism; Wahhabism; Islamism; Islamic fundamentalism

Muslim leader
- Influenced by: Imam Al-Shafi'i, Ahmad ibn Hanbal, Ibn Taymiyyah, Muhammad ibn 'Abd al-Wahhab, Al-Shatibi, Jamal al-Din al-Afghani, Muhammad 'Abduh, Husayn al-Jisr, Ibn al-Qayyim, Al-Tufi, Al-Mawardi, Al-Shawkani, Ibn Hazm
- Influenced: Muhammad Nasiruddin al-Albani, Muhammad Asad, Hassan al-Banna, Muhammad Taqi-ud-Din al-Hilali, Shakib Arslan, Muhibb-ud-Deen Al-Khatib, Vakkom Moulavi, Abul Hasan Ali Hasani Nadwi, Ibn 'Uthaymin, Ahmad Dahlan, Yusuf al-Qaradawi, Ahmad Muhammad Shakir, Sayyid Qutb, Abul A'la Maududi, Yasir Qadhi

Sayyid Muhammad Rashīd Rida Al-Hussaini (Arabic: سيد محمد رشيد رضا الحسيني, romanized: Muḥammad Rashīd Riḍā; 1865 – 22 August 1935) was an Islamic scholar, reformer, theologian and revivalist. An early Salafist, Rida called for the revival of hadith studies and, as a theoretician of an Islamic state, condemned the rising currents of secularism and nationalism across the Islamic world following the abolition of the Ottoman sultanate. He championed a global pan-Islamist program aimed at re-establishing a Caliphate to unite diverse peoples under a single global Islamic authority.

As a young hadith student, who studied al-Ghazali and Ibn Taymiyya, Rida believed reform was necessary to save the Muslim communities, eliminate Sufist practices he considered heretical, and initiate an Islamic renewal. He left Syria to work with Abduh in Cairo, where he was influenced by Abduh's Islamic Modernist movement and began publishing al-Manar in 1898. Through al-Manar's popularity across the Islamic world, Rida became one of the most influential Sunni jurists of his generation, leading the Arab Salafi movement and championing its cause.

He was Abduh's de facto successor and was responsible for a split in Abduh's disciples into one group rooted in Islamic modernism and the other in the revival of Islam. Salafism, also known as Salafiyya, which sought the "Islamization of modernity", emerged from the latter.

During the 1900s Rida abandoned his initial rationalist leanings and began espousing Salafi-oriented methodologies such as that of the Ahl-i Hadith movement. He later supported the Wahhabi movement, revived works by Ibn Taymiyyah, and shifted the Salafism movement into a more conservative and strict Scripturalist approach. He is regarded by a number of historians as "pivotal in leading Salafism's retreat" from the rationalist school of Abduh. He strongly opposed liberalism, Western ideas, freemasonry, Zionism, and European imperialism, and supported armed jihad to expel European influences from the Islamic World. He also laid the foundations for anti-Western, pan-Islamist struggle during the early 20th century.

== Early life and education ==
Muhammad Rashid Rida was born in al-Qalamoun, Beirut Vilayet, present-day Lebanon, in 1865 into a distinguished Sunni Shafi'i clerical family. His family relied on money earned from their limited olive tree holdings and fees earned by family members who served as ulama (scholars). The Rida ulama had been in charge of the al-Qalamoun mosque for several generations. Rida's father was an imam (prayer leader) in the mosque. The family, who were Sayyids, claimed descent from the Ahl al-Bayt, specifically Husayn ibn Ali.

Rida received a traditional religious education, attending elementary school at the local kuttab in Qalamūn before moving to the Ottoman government school in Tripoli. He then enrolled in Shaykh Ḥusayn al-Jisr's National Islamic School, where he learned hadith and fiqh. He also earned a diploma of ulema in 1897. During his education, he studied the books and treatises of scholars such as Ibn Taymiyyah, Ibn Qayyim, Ibn Qudama, al-Ghazali, al-Mawardi, Razi, Taftasani, and Ibn Rajab. Rida began preaching at the communal level and taught tafsir and other religious sciences at the village's central mosque. He also taught separate ibadah classes for women. Around this time, he first read al-Urwa al-Wuthqa, a periodical that was highly influential to him. It was published by Jamal al-Din al-Afghani and Muhammad Abduh. According to Lebanese-British historian Albert Hourani, Rida belonged to the last generation of traditionally trained Islamic scholars who could be "fully educated and yet alive in a self-sufficient Islamic world of thought."

== Muhammad Abduh ==
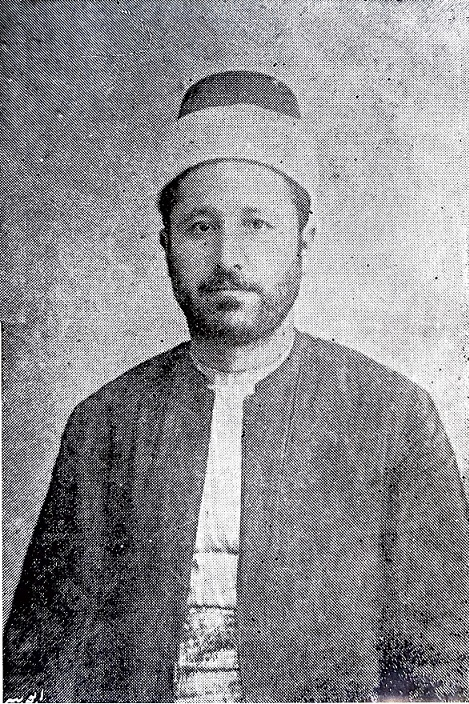
A photo of Muhammad Rashid Rida dated 1315 AH / 1897 CE

Rida met Muhammad Abduh, one of the editors of Al-Urwah al-Wuthqa, as an exile in Lebanon in the mid-1880s and quickly came to view Abduh as his mentor. In 1897, Rida decided to study under Abduh's co-editor Jamal al-Din al-Afghani, who at that time was in Istanbul. Rida suspected the Hamidian administration was responsible for al-Afghani's death later that year and left Istanbul to rejoin Abduh, one of Afghani's students, now in Egypt. They started the monthly periodical al-Manar, where Rida worked as its chief editor and owner until his death in 1935. At this time, he also studied Ibn Taymiyya and his disciples, which eventually led him to embrace ideas including revulsion against folk Sufism, criticism of taqlid, and the desire to revive hadith studies. All of these became foundational themes of the Salafism.

Following Abduh's death in 1905, Rida was seen as his de facto successor despite privately holding reservations about Abduh's ideas. Rida published several new editions of Abduh's works to make them conform more to the dogmas of the traditionalist creed than to Abduh's modernist beliefs. When interest in Abduh was revived in Egypt around the 1930s, the difference in narrative became more apparent. While Abduh's other disciples, Uthman Amin, Mustafa 'Abd al-Raziq, and Muhammad Naji, painted him as a rationalist, Rida continued to ascribe his own beliefs to Abduh's legacy, either ignoring or outright removing Abduh's more liberal ideas from the new editions of his works. Eventually, Rida's narrative became the dominant perception. Abduh's disciples eventually divided into two camps: one, which included Saad Zaghloul and Ali Abdel Raziq, was founded in modernism and Westernized secularism, and the other, the al-Manar party, was based in the revival of Islam. Salafism, also known as Salafiyya, which sought the "Islamization of modernity," emerged from the latter.

== Islamic unity under Ottomanism ==
In 1897, Rida, along with Rafiq al-'Azm and Saib Bey, formed the Ottoman Consultative Society in Cairo. The group consisted of Turks, Armenians, and Circassians living in Egypt and called for Islamic unity under Ottomanism; at this time, their ideas were consistent with those of the Young Turks. They condemned the autocratic Hamidian rule and European imperialism, and their ideas were distributed in Arabic and Turkish via al-Manar. The society disbanded in 1908 following the Young Turk Revolution, after which Azm joined the Committee of Union and Progress to pursue modernism and Rida became a vocal critic of the Young Turks.

In 1898, Rida began publishing articles encouraging Ottoman authorities to adopt a new religious strategy within the existing caliphal and pan-Islamic policy under Sultan Abd al-Hamid II. He recommended training scholars and sharia judges responsible for issuing fatwas (legal rulings) and discussing religious affairs by standardising the creation of different institutions. In one article, he suggested a World Islamic Congress, which would standardise creed, law, and teachings as its fundamental principle. He envisioned the "greatest branch" of the caliph in Mecca for two reasons: the pilgrimage would bring branch leaders to Mecca, where the caliph would be able to disseminate knowledge; and because it was away "from the intrigues and suspicions of [non-Muslim] foreigners." He envisioned a Congress-published religious journal to counter innovative and heretic ideas and to share translations of religious works. The caliph would oversee affairs but was otherwise just like any other Congress member. Scholars would compile legal works from madhāhib (law schools) and adapt them to contemporary situations, and resulting legislation would be implemented by the caliph in all Muslim societies. The desire for a Muslim Congress would reappear in later works.

This global religious society, according to Rida, would pave the way for a spiritual caliphate. Islamic unity required the abolition of sectarian differences as well as the revival of doctrines practiced by the Salaf, the first three generations of Islam, which pre-dated different sects and madhāhib. He further advocated for a centralising policy that returned all Muslims, schools, and sects to the fundamentals of faith and that united Muslims against European colonialism. He believed that shura was a basic feature of any Islamic state and saw the caliphate as a necessary temporal power to defend Islam and defend Islamic law, or sharia. Ottoman authorities were unreceptive and at times hostile to Rida's proposals, in particular criticising his suggestion of making the caliph an ordinary member of society. While they were open to considering a Muslim Congress, they preferred Istanbul as a hub rather than Mecca, as it would establish a parliamentary forum in the capital of the Empire. Sultan Abdul Hamid II himself opposed the idea of a Congress altogether, claiming it to be a ploy for Arab separatism and Hejazi autonomy. The proposals were also in direct contradiction to the established Ottoman policy on the Sultan's ability to enforce absolute authority.

Rida's denunciation of Sufism and condemnation of the Rifaʽi and Qadiriyya orders for ritualising innovated practices enraged Abū l-Hudā al-Sayyādī, the Sultan's Syrian advisor. Ottoman authorities began harassing Rida's family in Syria and al-Sayyādī requested that his brother-in-law Badrī Bāšā, the governor of Tripoli, send military authorities after Rida's brothers. They later attempted to confiscate his family mosque and Rida wrote that al-Sayyādī planned to assassinate him in Egypt. Rida's journal al-Manar was subsequently banned in Ottoman regions though the censorship did not dissuade him from continuing to write and publish. In 1901, Abd al-Rahman al-Kawakibi published Umm al-Qura, which detailed the idea of a World Muslim Congress for the first time. Al-Kawakibi also set the Congress in Mecca, which was seen as a staunch anti-Ottoman elaboration of the pan-Islamist movement, as he argued for replacing Ottoman rule with an Arabic Qurayshi caliphate elected by the Congress. He also condemned Sufism. Rida expanded this idea in a series of articles in al-Manar.

Despite rejection from the Empire, Rida continued supporting the preservation of the sultanate during the Hamidian Era through the first decade of the 1900s. He believed that the dynastic nature of the Ottoman state was reconciled with the classical legal approach that allowed caliphs to rule through force rather than with shura, consent, and adherence to Islamic law. While holding the Ottoman rule to be based on tribalism, he eventually decided not to rebel so openly against the Empire out of concern that it would damage the only Islamic temporal power. Instead, he focused on advocating reform for consultative governance within the confines of the state and writing to condemning partisanship in madhāhib and all forms of factionalism. He continued supporting pan-Arabism and promoted Arab eminence and Islamic unity. Rida believed that Arabs were better suited for Islamic leadership, thus linking Arab revival to Islamic unity. He condemned ethnic prejudice, strongly believing that racial conflict was the cause of "Muslim weakness in the past."

Rida's resentment for Abdul Hamid grew following the 31 March incident and subsequent 1909 Ottoman countercoup, which Rida saw as delegitimising Hamid's rule and his deposition as God putting an end to tyranny. After the revolution in October, he visited Istanbul hoping to establish a school for Islamic missionaries and to reconcile Arabs and Turks in the Empire. Both of his goals were rejected and he became a sworn enemy of the Young Turks and the Committee of Union and Progress (CUP). His initial optimism about the newly-appointed Sultan Mehmed V was short-lived as the effective power focused on supporting the Young Turks. Rida re-asserted his belief that the Young Turks had abandoned Islamism and Ottomanism to pursue a nationalist Turkification policy.

When Rida supported the Young Turks, he put aside concerns about CUP's nationalism; by 1909, however, he accused the group of spreading heresy, Westernising Islamic government, and creating chaos. He wrote a number of articles in the Turkish press condemning policies based on nationalism and race and warned that nationalism was a European concept that violated Islamic principles, and would lead to the collapse of the multi-ethnic, multi-racial Ottoman Empire. He sought decentralisation of the Empire without challenging the legitimacy of the Ottoman Sultan, and made sure to distinguish between his opposition to CUP and his loyalty to the Ottoman state. Until World War I, Rida advocated autonomy for Ottoman territories while seeking to maintain the caliphate in Istanbul. In 1911, he wrote: "Islam is a religion of authority and sovereignty... Muslims all over the world believe that the Ottoman state is fulfilling the role of defender of the Muslim faith" and that mistakes made by sultans would disappear once European colonisation was no longer a threat.

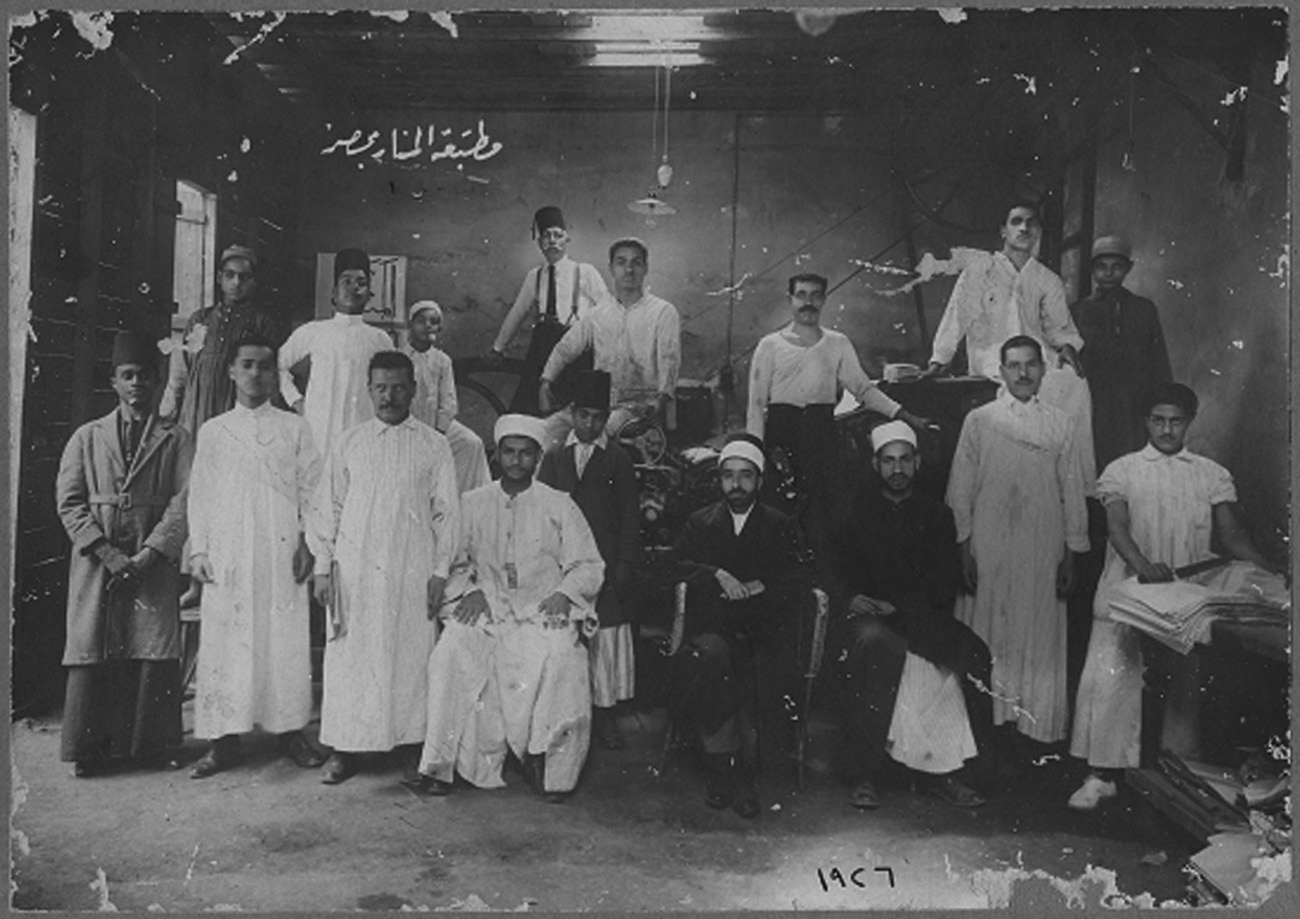
Employees of the Al-Manar Publishing House run by Imam Rashid Rida. Al-Manar became a global outlet for pan-Islamist revolutionary themes and Islamic revivalist ideals.

=== Criticism of CUP ===
By the 1912 general elections, CUP (Committee of Union and Progress) was the dominant power in the Ottoman Empire and had strong allyships with conservative scholars. CUP maintained its power in the election and Salafi persecution began again, this time on a larger scale. Rida and his disciples were accused of plotting secession and seeking an Arab caliphate. Despite this, Rida attacked CUP members as early as 1910, calling them atheists and freemasons, alleging their exploitation of Islam was for selfish political gain, and that they sought destruction of the Islamic world. After the Battle of Tripoli in 1911 and the First Balkan War, Rida became deeply concerned about the imminent collapse of the Ottoman state and worried that colonial European empires would seize power from the Ottomans. A pamphlet in al-Manar addressing amirs and Arab leaders in Hejaz, Najd, Yemen, and tribes in the Arabian Peninsula and the Persian Gulf, called for Arab unity. It warned of the imminent European threat to Syria and the Arabian Peninsula, which would be followed by the occupation of Islamic holy cities. He also warned that sacred Islamic relics would be stolen and displayed in European museums.

Around this time Rida established the Society of the Arab Association (Jam'iyyat ul-Jami'a al-Arabiyya), a secret society seeking union between the Arabian Peninsula and the Ottoman Arab provinces. The Egyptian nationalists, especially the Watani Party, attacked the society, calling it a conspiracy that sought conflict with the Turks, secession of Arab countries from the Ottoman Empire, and establishment of an Arab caliphate. Rida denied these allegations, but later explicitly advocated via the Society for Arab secessionism from the Ottoman Empire.

He sought to pressure the Ottoman state on behalf of Arabs, urging them to prepare a contingency plan for defense against European ambitions in the event that the Ottoman Empire fell. He corresponded with Ibn Sa'ud of Najd, Imam Yahya of Yemen and aI-Sayyid al-Idrisi of 'Asir in an attempt to convince them of how crucial it was. Sa'ud asked Rida to send a messenger to explain the plan from a religious and political standpoint to persuade his followers. Rida sent a messenger along with numerous religious treatises. However, due to outbreak of the World War I, his materials were confiscated in Bombay and never made it to ibn Sa'ud. In 1912, Rida met with Mubarak Al-Sabah, the shaykh of Kuwait, but his relationships with Yahya and al-Idrisi were ruptured by the war. Rida was convinced that Ottoman statesmen had developed a "European complex" that threatened the security of Arabs and Turks. He also believed that Europeanisation of the Ottoman Empire was impossible to reform since it was solely dependent on Europe. He proposed that Istanbul be made a military outpost and shift the capital either to Damascus or the Anatolian city of Konya. He wrote that Arabs and Turks should then create "local Asiatic military formations" capable of defending themselves in case of foreign danger, with priority given to defending the Hejaz and two holy sanctuaries in Mecca and Medina and the lands adjacent to them.

=== 1913 coup d'état ===
In 1913 CUP (Committee of Union and Progress) launched a coup to establish a one-party state under a de facto triumvirate of the Three Pashas, which consisted of Enver Pasha, Talaat Pasha, and Djemal Pasha. During the years of the World War, Arabs and Salafis were harshly persecuted by Djemal Pasha, a CUP leader holding military and civilian power in Syria. Many Arabists would be court-martialed and executed, and many Salafi scholars exiled, leading prominent Salafis such as Rida and Tahir al-Jaza'iri to support the British-backed Arab Revolt led by Sharif Hussain. Rida condemned the coup and continued to call the Young Turks an "enemy of Arabs and of Islam." By 1913, he began organizing against the Ottoman government to establish a new Islamic pan-Arab empire, which would include the Arabian Peninsula, Syria, and Iraq.

Rida joined the ranks of Sa'ud's boosters in the Arab world. Rida saw him as a strong Muslim ruler capable of preventing British imperial designs on the Arab world. In March 1914, Rida wrote in al-Manar that CUP was assisting Zionists in Palestine and accused Zionists of seeking to establish a Jewish state from "Palestine to the Euphrates". He warned that not a single Muslim would remain in the Promised Land of Judaism. Al-Manar became a chief source of spreading awareness against Zionism in the months leading up to World War I, portraying Jewish people as the controllers of European finances.

== World War I ==
During World War I, Rida's activities primarily involved negotiating with the British and Sharif Hussein of Mecca, attempting to persuade them on the issue of establishing a united pan-Islamic state with autonomy for different regions to prepare for the eventual collapse of the Ottoman Empire. He had always been suspicious of the British and became even more so after the Sykes–Picot Agreement, which was intended to divide Ottoman Arab provinces between Britain and France. Rida saw this as an attack on all Muslims, not just Arabs.

== Post-war ==
Rida's militant opposition to Westernisation reached its peak in the aftermath of the war. In his 1922–23 work al-Khilafa aw al-Imama al-'Uzma (The Caliphate or the Supreme Imamate), he proposed comprehensive pan-Islamism and called upon Muslims to come together under their shared Islamic faith to shun emerging nationalist movements. He stressed the importance of Arab leadership in unifying Muslim ranks. Among the most important parts of his agenda was to thwart British imperial designs in the Arabian Peninsula. Sharif Hussein's rejection of these ideas and his continued alliance with Britain eventually became irreconcilable to Rida. In 1923, after Hussein's seizure of Hejaz, Rida called upon Arabian emirs to free Hejaz from Hashemite rule. He saw Sa'ud of the Sultanate of Najd as the most suitable candidate for this task, not only because he favoured the Wahhabis as the best hope for Arab and Islamic revival, but also because of their promising military-political capabilities to bring stability and security to the Hejaz, and to defend it from any European aggressions. Sa'ud and his followers were orthodox Muslims in line with the doctrines of the Salaf, which attracted Rida. He remained devoted to Sa'ud to his end despite mixed results from rehabilitation campaigns and difficulties encountered by Rida's own disciples. Rida considered him the best available Muslim statesman and believed his kingdom offered the best prospect of becoming the political arm of the balanced Islahi movement. At this point, based on past experiences, Rida had come to understand that reform required money as well as political support.

The Allied Powers' post-World War Order and the betrayal of Sharif Hussein led to a radical phase in Rida's pan-Islamist enterprise and he became a key figure in injecting militant anti-Westernism into Syrian and Egyptian Islamic politics. He had become vehemently anti-British, calling democracy a "colonial deceit", and withheld any more attempts at mediation with Western powers. He proposed a Universal Islamic System to replace the failed Wilsonian Peace. When Sharif Hussein declared himself Caliph of Muslims in March 1924 following the Turkish Abolition of Caliphate, Rida called him a heretic dangerous to the entire Muslim community and saw his seizure of power as a desecration of Islam. Rida later published the treatise The Wahhabis and Hijaz, where he argued for Wahhabi rule over Hejaz and condemned Sharif Hussein and his family for their selling of Arab lands in complicity with the colonial powers' agenda for the sake of their personal dynastic ambitions. In the treatise, Rida also warned of British imperial ambitions in the region, which he claimed would subjugate its Muslim population.

=== Wahhabism ===
Rida's views of Wahhabism became more favorable upon his arrival in Egypt in the 1890s, when he read about the movement and al-Jabartī and al-Nāṣiri, though he was still critical of what he perceived as a lack of moderation in the group, as he considered moderation foundational to Salafism. As early as the 1900s, Rida applauded Sa'ud's victories during the Saudi–Rashidi War. He became a major proponent of Wahhbism following World War I, when he began seeing Muslim scholars as pro-Westernisation Muslim intelligentsia. His opposition to innovation and mysticism in Islam was another of his principles seen within Wahhabism, which called for "pristine Islam" and a total rejection of saints and superstitions. He eventually began advocating for their rehabilitation into the Islamic world.

In 1919 he published Muhammad ibn 'Abd al-Wahhab's Kashf al-Shubuhat (Removal of Doubts) and in 1920 pushed Muhammad ibn 'Abd al-Wahhab as a mujaddid of Islam. During the 1920s, more than 20 Wahhabi works were published through the al-Manar Publishing House, including fatwas condemning the Ikhwan. Rida argued that the Wahhabi movement would have expanded and led Islamic revival if it were not for the excessive zeal of some of its supporters and the conspiracies of its adversaries. In 1922, he distributed (Majmūʿat al-Rasāʾil waʾl-Masāʾil al-Najdiyya (The Compendium of Najdī Epistles and Responsa). Majmuʿat al-Tawhid al-Najdiyya (Monotheistic Collection from Najd) another work published by Rida, was a four-volume collection of essays with writings by Ibn Taymiyya, Ibn Qudama, and Ibn Rajab, reportedly at the request of a Najdi merchant. This created friction between Sufi and Salafi factions in Syria.

By 1926 references to "excessive zeal" had disappeared and the Wahhabi's initial failure was instead blamed on corrupt Ottomans and the British Empire. Rida asked followers of his Islah movement to support Wahhabis against three hazards that threatened the community from within: the "Shi'a fanatics," Sufism, and "Westernised preachers of atheism". In 1927, Rida wrote that the Wahhabis had become a large group in Egypt, with adherents among the religious scholars at institutions such as Al-Azhar University. He had begun to adopt some of the Wahabbis' more uncompromising attitudes to religious reform. Detractors accused him of becoming an official spokesperson for the Wahhabis due to financial assistance from Sa'ud, which Rida denied.

Rida's endorsement of Wahhabism was the decisive factor in the spread of its influence beyond the Kingdom's borders. Wahhabi scholars consistently emphasised their affinity to mainstream Sunni legal schools and affirm that their tradition was among the several manifestations of Salafism. Al Sa'ud encouraged Saudi Muslims to tone down their dogmatic views and in the 1920s facilitated the movement of several of Rida's disciples to Hejaz, where, through education, their beliefs were shifted from exclusivist, narrow-minded Classical Wahhabism prone to takfirism to a more tolerant and accepting people. Dar al-Tawhid, a religious educational institute in Ta'if overseen by Muhammad Bahjat Athari, one of Rida's disciples, put forth one of the biggest reeducation efforts. Najdi scholar Ibn Bulayhid clashed with Rida's disciples over his belief in the flat earth. While Rida did damage control on the rumours, prominent Wahhabi scholars like Muhammad ibn 'Abd al-Latif Al al-Shaykh refuted his beliefs and affirmed the sphericity of earth. In an al-Manar article about education and the dangers of stagnation, Rida criticized flat-earthers and enemies of science.

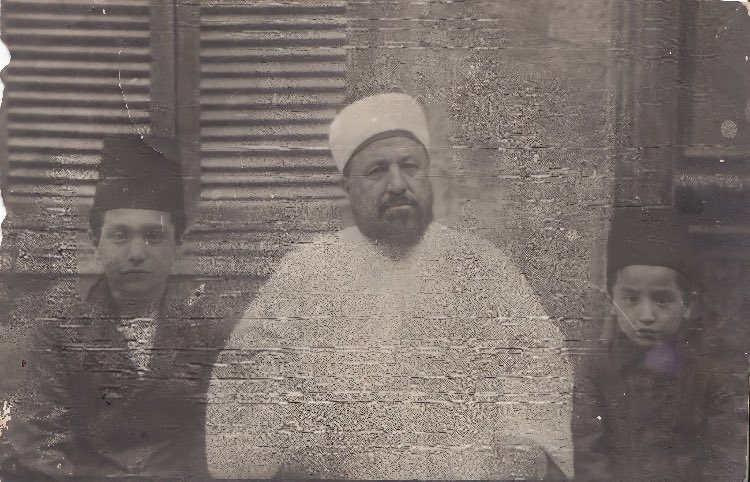
Imam Rashid Rida alongside his sons Muhammad Shafi' (right) and Al-Mu'tasim (left)

=== Attacks on Hejaz and Damascus ===
Rida strongly championed Sa'ud's campaigns in Hejaz in 1924 and 1925. He wrote in al-Manar that the nascent Saudi state was the best hope for Islamic revival and portrayed it as the last major bastion of Islamic resistance to the colonial order. He celebrated Sharif Hussein's defeat in the Battle of Mecca, which he called a historic event. Sa'ud united Hejaz and Northern Arabia over the next several years, making his rule an Islamic alternative to Atatürk in Turkey. Rida saw his independence, religiosity, and pragmatism as an exemplification of balanced reform.

Rida defended the new Saudi regime from its detractors, calling the Wahhabis "the best Muslims," as they observed the doctrines of Imam Ibn Hanbal and Ibn Taymiyyah. Rida made anti-Shi'ism "a major trait of his school" and called for a Wahhabi demolition of the shrines of al-Baqi. He called subsequently outraged Shi'ites rafidites and instruments of the Persians. Sa'ud continued to impress Rida by condemning rumours of Wahhabis desecrating graves and slaughtering women and children in their conquests as "British propaganda".

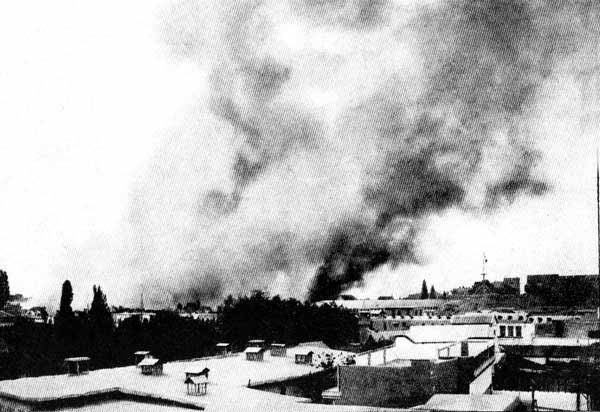
The city of Damascus in flames after French artillery shelling during the Syrian Revolt of 1925

Rida's subsequent political efforts focused on two fronts: campaigning for Syrian independence and supporting Saudi efforts to unify the Arabian Peninsula. He was a member of the Syrian National Congress until its dissolution in 1920 by France. When the Great Syrian Revolt broke out in 1925, Rida and the Syrian–Palestinian Congress provided it full support, with financial backing from the nascent Saudi state. By 1927, the rebellion had been defeated and nationalist factions of Syro-Palestinian Congress approached British and French authorities to seek a compromise. This angered Rida and only served to strengthen his respect of Sa'ud, who he believed the only sovereign Islamic ruler who stood up to colonial powers and guarded the holiest sites of Islam. British intelligence in Cairo, concerned about Rida's influence, monitored his activities.

=== World Islamic Congresses ===
Rida was a delegate in the preparatory subcommittee for the 1926 Islamic Congress for Caliphate held in Cairo, which declared that the caliphate was still possible. He was not, however, an active participate in the Cairo Congress itself and considered its organizers to be inefficient. He enthusiastically joined the Pan-Islamic Congress established by Sa'ud the same year. He became a prominent delegate and organizer of the Congress, whose objectives were international Islamic recognition of the Saudi rule of Hejaz, consultations on Hajj services, and erasure of past reputation of sectarianism associated with the Wahhabis. Rida drafted conference protocols on behalf of Sa'ud and wrote the King's opening address. Rida pressed for a collective oath of Congress delegates to pledge to rid the Arabian Peninsula of its foreign influences, and proposed an Islamic pact between Muslim governments, envisioning the assembly as a precursor to a league of Muslim nations. Despite his enthusiasm, no significant resolutions were passed and no subsequent congresses were held in Mecca due to the deep religious, doctrinal, and political differences across the Muslim world. Still, with prominent figures like Grand Mufti of Jerusalem al-Husseini in attendance, the conference marked the consolidation of the alliance between pan-Islamists and the leaders of the new Wahhabi state. In defense of the Wahhabis' religious credentials, Rida cited Tarikh Najd, a treatise composed by 'Abd Allah ibn Muhammad Aal-al Shaykh, the son of al-Wahhab. He asserted that Wahhabis had sincere zeal for the Islamic faith and were among the most hostile to foreign influences. Rida later backed Sa'ud's campaign to eradicate fanatical Ikhwan rebels.

== Salafism ==
A 1912 photo of the meeting of Rida with the scholars of the Nadwatul Ulama during Rida's visit to Darul Uloom Nadwatul Ulama, Lucknow. Rida is sitting at the middle of seated row.

Rida's early exposure to the Hanbali school in Syria informed his vision of a puritanical renewal based on the revival of the values of the Salaf, the first three generations of Islam, and argued that Salafism was "an Islam purged of impurities and Western influences".

In 1905 he spoke of the Salafis as a collective noun, theologically distinct from the Ash'aris, and considered Wahhabis Salafis. He published an article in al-Manar called Speculative Theology is a bid'ah according to the Pious Predecessors, as well as a discussion of the importance of following the Salaf in the promotion of hadith sciences, the spread of which he identified with the Islamic revival. In 1914, Rida defined mad'hab al-salaf as "nothing other than to act according to the Qur'an." The term Salafi was historically used by Sunni scholars to denote Muslims who claimed Athari theology. This was how Rida initially learned to view the term. He and Syrian reformer Jamal al-Din al-Qasimi later referred to Salafi more distinctly as Sunni Muslims who adopted Athari theology and rejected allegorical interpretations of God's attributes.

He was critical of speculative interpretation (ta'wil) which went beyond what he considered to be the literal meaning of the text. Though he was influenced by al-Ghazali in childhood, Rida criticised his work for his practice of ta'wil and mystical interpretation of the injustices of sharia. Like Ibn Taymiyya, Rida was more sharply critical of Ibn Arabi for his metaphysical doctrine, Wahdat al-Wujud. However, Rida argued that allegorical interpretation of Qur'an was sometimes appropriate because he believed that many Muslims would have abandoned their faith without them. He counseled Najdi scholars on the necessity of balanced reform and sent them copies of Tafsir al-Manar to study. In a letter to al-Sa'adi, he wrote that "[i]t is necessary that you distinguish between natural sciences... and philosophy, both ancient and modern. Philosophy consists of opinions and theoretical thoughts whereas natural sciences are an expression of the science by which God gave benefits to His creation, such as water, steam, [and] air."

In the 1920s Rida came to see Salafism as religious fervour and puritanical revival of old Islamic practices. He also became a committed supporter of Saudi military expansions. While politically pan-Islamist, Salafism became increasingly puritanical and faced opposition by conservative quarters like Al-Azhar University. It did, however, find support from the Arabian Peninsula and the Ahl-i Hadith movement on the subject of Wahhabi revival. Muhammad Hamid al-Fiqi, one of Riḍā's disciples, was appointed president of the Meccan Department of Printing and Publication, where he started a new al-Manar-adjacent Islamic journal, al-Islah, on Riḍā's recommendation. The journal pushed the key doctrines of Salafism and integrated Arabia into the transnational network of Islamic reformist efforts while fostering a broader sense of Islamic identity among the Arab elite.

In 1912, Salafi scholars Muhibb al-Din al-Khatib and Abd al-Fattah al-Qatlan had begun working with Riḍā and their Salafiyya Bookstore was relocated and merged into Riḍā's Manar Bookstore. He was also invited that year to Darul Uloom Nadwatul Ulama by Nadwatul Ulama leader Shibli Nomani. The seminary's goals were compatible with Salafism and Riḍā did two lectures at their Lucknow campus, where he met several influential Ahl-i Hadith scholars. He then visited Darul Uloom Deoband, where he saw Deobandi scholar Anwar Shah Kashmiri give a talk on the Qur'an, hadith, Hanafi fiqh, the Deobandi school, and Indian Islamic revivalist Shah Waliullah Dehlawi. Riḍā highly praised this lecture.

From the 1920s onwards Riḍā and his disciples conceptually expanded Salafism in a legal sense. He claimed to use scriptural proofs on legal issues as the Salaf had done. Despite promoting the non-madhab or pre-madhab approach to Islamic law, Riḍā and his followers did not dismiss the classical system of fiqh. They maintained that all four schools of law were virtuous, and promoted reconciliation between them, while still condemning sectarianism between schools. In a 1913 article in al-Manar, Riḍā declared Najd as the region in which Salafi theology was most widespread.

Riḍā believed only hadith scholars were capable of reviving sunnah. Starting in 1915, he began emphasizing that scholars of the early Ahl al-Hadith school were the ones who preserved the religion by resisting threats of heretical innovations. As such, he believed that the methods of the muhaddithin in scrutinizing and using hadith reports in law had to be revived and introduced into society. In the 1920s, he and his students identified themselves as following a "Salafi approach" in jurisprudence, thereby widening Salafi paradigm to impact the realm of law. Riḍā perceived Athari theology as more rational than speculative theology (Kalam) and defended Hanbalite condemnation of Kalam, as Athari had stronger orthodox religious foundations and defended conservative Islamic values from Western and secular ideologies more effectively. He stressed to his disciples that Salafi theology was simple for the masses to learn since it is like "walking on a straight path," whereas he saw studying Ash'ari theology as "swimming in a deep sea, where one has to struggle against the waves of philosophical doubts and the currents of theoretical investigation." In 1922–23, he published a series of articles in al-Manar titled The Caliphate or the Supreme Imamate, where he proposed gradualist measures of education, reformation, and purification through Salafism.

== Death ==
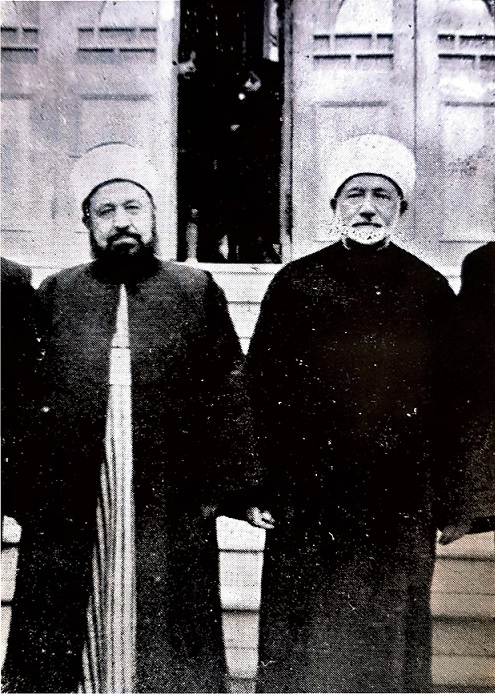
Riḍā with the Syrian Islamic scholar 'Abd al-Qadir Al-Maghribi in early 1935 C.E

Riḍā died on the return trip from Suez to Cairo after seeing off King ibn Sa'ud. Because most of his money was funneled into publishing and other revivalist efforts, Riḍā faced financial difficulties throughout his life and died in debt. The Sheikh of al-Azhar, Mustafa al Maraghi, remarked that Rida had three main opponents: Muslim modernists, non-Muslims, and religious obscurantists.

Egyptian hadith scholar and Rida's disciple, Ahmad Shakir wrote:

"Islam has lost today a very high personality, an Imam, a Hujjah among the Imams of guidance, a great Mujahid and a great reformer. He lived benign and died a martyr!"

== Views ==
=== Tawhid ===
Rida's vision of tawhid formed the central theme of his reformist teachings, as he believed it was supported by rationality and opposed all forms of superstitious beliefs, oppression, and ignorance. Later Muslims' deviation from pure tawhid as practiced by the Salaf, Rida argued, led to their decline and subjugation. Echoing ibn Taymiyyah, Riḍā also condemned the practice of tawassul as religious innovation. Riḍā called for the destruction of tombs and structures built above graves and banning practices associated with grave veneration, which he condemned as polytheism. Among these acts were worshipping creatures as deities besides God; believing God granted part of his divine powers or shares aspects of his dominion with the humans; and believing in the lordship of God, but worshipping worldly beings, such as seeking aid from the dead during sorrow.

Muhammad Abduh, Rashid Rida's early mentor, had adopted an Ash'ari methodology of metaphorical and interpretive view of what he viewed as potentially anthropomorphic descriptions of attributes of God. Rashid Riḍā, who was advocating Salafi theology after the First World War, began writing lengthy refutations of his teachers views. In his commentary to Risalah al Tawhid, he criticized Abduh for straying away from the literalist Salafi approach. In response to Abduh's statement that the most important aspect of tawhid was belief in "God's oneness in His essence and the creation of the universes"; Riḍā remarked that Abduh failed to mention tawḥīd al-ʾulūhiyyah, the view of Allah as the only god, and disagreed with Abduh's stance on divine attributes. As a Salafi, Riḍā pushed back against the Ash'ari and Maturidite schools and advocated the traditionalist doctrine of Qur'anic letters, recitation, and voice being uncreated (ghayr Makhluq) word of God, a belief based on the works of ibn Taymiyyah. In Riḍā's editions of Abduh's works, his views that contradicted traditionalist creed were either deleted or critiqued in commentaries to conform to Salafi doctrines.

=== Tajdid and taqlid ===
Riḍā believed that the early Muslims' upholding of tawhid and sunnah were the primary reasons for their spiritual and material success. He praised their independence, free from blind adherence and motivated by Quranic teachings. He believed Muslim decline began after the end of the Islamic caliphates in the 13th century, when the Arab rule, and the influence of their adherence to sunnah, ended. Riḍā also believed that non-Arab rulers engaged in religiously-harmful innovation and superstition. Based on his reading of hadith, he believed that a second Islamic victory was prophesised and undertook initiatives for global revivalism as a result. He thought the Muslim world faced crises in spiritual, educational, and legislative affairs, and identified Islamic religious reform as a "triple unification of doctrine, law, and ethics." His adoption of Wahhabism's puritanical tenets after 1918 symbolised his adoption of a Hanbalite reformist framework. To achieve this comprehensive Islamic system, Riḍā sought to revive the classical Islamic theory of life. To him, the reconstitution of the Islamic system was only possible by directly returning to the original sources. In this, he also defended the superiority of naql (textual sources) over aql (rational sources), and condemned philosophy and Sufism.

Riḍā travelled to Europe only once, on political grounds; he did not speak English or other European languages. He disliked the social life and was critical of Christianity. Despite this, he had a robust sensitivity to challenges faced by Muslims in the modern world. He believed that the inner decay of Muslims, as well as the efforts by the Catholic Church, prevented Europeans from embracing Islam. He wanted Muslims to accept aspects of modernity only to the extent to which it was essential for the recovery of Islamic strength. He considered it a duty for Muslims to study modern science and technology. He repeatedly urged legal experts and the scholars to come together and produce modernised legal works based directly from the Qur'an and hadith in a way that was accessible for all believers.

Riḍā was a leading exponent of Salafism and was especially critical of what he considered taqlid (blind following) of excessive Sufism, which he believed to have distorted the original message of Islam. He encouraged both laymen and scholars to read and study directly the primary sources of Islam by themselves. This principle enabled Riḍā to examine contemporary subjects through a modern lens. He believed that the "fragmentation of Muslims into sects and parties" resulting from taqlid was particularly harmful and would lead to worship of someone other than God, which was in direct contradiction of tawhid.

Theologically Riḍā argued that rigid adherence to madhāhib prevented Muslims from thinking independently and prohibited their right to access the Scriptures directly. This enabled tyrants, supported by corrupt scholars, to justify oppression and preserve their rule. He also believed that hadiths regarding the Saved Sect referred to the ahl al-Ittiba, the people who followed proof-texts. He considered those who were pro-mad'hab to be innovators and thus dangerous to Islam. Despite this, he did not ignore the legacy of the four mad'habs and viewed their legal literature as a resource from which he derived rulings, adapting to changing circumstances. Although he placed The Four Imams at the peak of juristic excellence, he claimed that ibn Taymiyyah was more relevant for contemporary Muslims in practice. Riḍā believed that the Saved Sect was indisputably Sunni Islam.

Riḍā's criticism of taqlid extended beyond sharia and Islamic theology to include socio-political developments. He believed these associations and the consequent partisanship influenced mad'hab affiliations and fanaticism. He was more critical of al-Mutafarnijun, Europeanised emulators who he regarded as guilty of taqlid for abandoning the path of the Salaf. While the madhab partisans are influenced by administrative positions of power and promote governmental interests, the Mutafarijun divided the Muslim community based on differences in language, nationality, and geography, and conceived new identities within the nation-states, which Riḍā considered significantly more harmful.

=== Secularism and modernism ===
Riḍā believed that the management of state affairs and its principles were an integral part of Islamic faith. Accordingly, he called for the restoration of an Islamic caliphate and waged fierce battles against secularist trends that emerged during the 20th century. He considered calls for separation of religion and state to be the most dangerous threat to Islam. By the 1920s, Riḍā had discovered that his most formidable opponents were not the tradition-bound Sufi-Ash'arite scholars of al-Azhar but the Western-educated secularists who pushed Abduh's utilitarian principles what he considered to be too far. Riḍā made vehement denunciations and attacks against modernists such as Ali Abdel Raziq and Ahmed Safwat. By this point, his main priority had shifted to repeal what he considered the "Western invasion of Islamic culture." This shift was also evident in his promotion of Wahhabism, Salafism, and the works of ibn Taymiyyah, ibn Qayyim, and ibn Qudamah. Riḍā admired ibn Taymiyyah and ibn Abd al-Wahhab in particular and was inspired to adopt a more conservative and orthodox outlook.

Riḍā called on Muslims to reject Westernisation and labelled Islamic modernists as "false renewers" and "heretics" whose efforts were harming Muslim societies. He accused Westernised modernizers of corruption, immorality, and treason. He was a fierce believer that any reforms going against Scripture is heresy and should be censured. His campaigns were instrumental in putting modernists like Ali Abd al-Raziq to trial for what Riḍā viewed as attacks on sharia. Riḍā was a strong literalist opposed the trend of rejecting hadith in Egypt. Prominent in this movement was the Egyptian physician Muhammad Tawfiq Sidqi who grew out of Abduh's modernist traditions. Riḍā disagreed with Sidqi's beliefs that hadith was prone to corruption due to flawed transmission and that Muslims should rely solely on the Qur'an, which Riḍā took as a minimisation of Muhammad's importance. He believed modernists had gone too far into Westernism in their reformist attempts, leading Muslims to lose their faith. He used the Qur'anic term Jahiliyya to refer to ignorance of pre-Islamic Arabia and the conditions of contemporary Muslims, and believed that governance not adhering to sharia was apostasy. This idea would become a major rationale behind the armed Jihad of future militant organisations.

He strongly criticised scholars who issued fatwas aligning with modernist ideals. Riḍā believed that a society that properly obeyed sharia would be successfully resistant to both capitalism and class-based socialism, since this ideal society would be immune to temptations. He dismissed modernist advocacy of cultural synthesis, emphasizing the self-sufficiency and comprehensiveness of Islamic faith. He believed that the rising individualism, irreligion, materialism, rationalisation, and scientism in Europe following World War I would lead to their downfall. In his treatise Yusr al-Islam wa Usül at-Tashri' al-'Ämm (The Accommodating Spirit of Islam and the Sources of General Jurisprudence), Riḍā explained that reform advocates who fall between mad'han partisanship and modernist Westernisation are "those who affirm that it is possible to resuscitate Islam and renew its true guidance." His aggressive rejection of Westernisation eventually led to the formation of transnational Islamist movements such as the Muslim Brotherhood and Jamaat-e-Islami.

=== Anti-Zionism and antisemitism ===
"You complacent ones, raise your heads and open your eyes. Look at what other peoples and nations do. Do you surrender to what is being told about you in the world? Are you happy to see the newspapers of every country reporting that the poor of the weakest peoples [the Jews], whom the governments of all nations are expelling, master so much knowledge and understanding of civilization methods that they are able to possess and colonize your country, and turn its masters into laborers and its wealthy into poor?.. Think about this question (Zionism), and make it the subject of your discussion.. Then [contemplate] whether it is clear to you that you have neglected the rights of your homeland and service to your people and your community. Examine and contemplate, consider and consult, talk and discuss this matter. It is more worthy of consideration than creating disasters and insulting innocent ones."

— Muhammad Rashid Rida, Al-Manar, p. 108 (April 9, 1898)

Riḍā published an article condemning Zionism in 1898, making him one of the earliest scholarly critics of the movement. He warned that the Jewish people were being mobilised to migrate to Palestine with European backing to establish a Zionist state, and urged Arabs to take action, as he thought the Zionists' ultimate ambition was to convert al-Aqsa mosque into a synagogue and to cleanse Palestine of all of its Arab inhabitants.

In his 1929 treatise Thawrat Filastin (The Palestinian Revolution), he claimed that the Jewish people were historically fanatic observers of in-group solidarity and exclusivity, and refused to assimilate with other cultures. Riḍā listed a number of historical crimes against the Israelites including polytheism, usury, and offenses against the prophets of Islam. He claimed that God was punishing them for this by taking away their kingdom and subjecting them to centuries of Christian persecution. In one of his final texts, published in 1935, Riḍā told Muslims to unite and "take the path traced by our ancestors, who defeated the Jewish in the first epoch [of Islam] and expelled them from the Arabian Peninsula." Riḍā viewed the Zionist enterprise as part of a wider British imperial scheme to consolidate their regional dominion and provoke civil strife among Muslims.

Riḍā propagated antisemitic stereotypes and conspiracy theories that would later become popular across the Arab world and various Islamist movements. Al-Manar regularly featured anti-Semitic articles linking Jewish people and Freemasons who eagerly sought to exploit others' wealth. He was a strong believer in the global Jewish conspiracy, and, in the 1930s, he also promoted the ideas of The Protocols of the Elders of Zion. He believed Jewish people were controlling the Western banking system and were behind turning Christian states against Muslims. He wrote that the establishment of a Jewish state was preparation for the arrival of their Messiah, which Riḍā thought to be the anti-Christ and would be killed by Jesus, the true Messiah in Islam. He believed that Jewish people were competent only in the financial sector and required British military backing to make up for their inadequate skills in other areas. He also claimed the Jewish people were a "selfish and chauvinist, cunning and perfidious" people who sought to exploit and exterminate other people.

Riḍā alleged that the Jewish people had undermined the power of the Roman Catholic Church in Europe and introduced freemasonry, through which they manipulated the Bolsheviks and the Young Turks against the Russian and Ottoman empires, respectively, and that they orchestrated the French Revolution. In November 1910, he publicly asserted that the Young Turk Revolution was a Jewish response to the Hamidian regime's rejection of Zionist plans to reclaim of their Third Temple in Jerusalem and its surrounding territories, through which they sought to reestablish their kingdom. He identified the Young Turks, who he thought were conspiring with Zionists in building a Jewish Kingdom of Zion in Palestine, as the masonic fifth columnists and were engineering a war between the Islamic and Western worlds. He believed Jewish people created capitalism as a tool of manipulation and that they were attacking religious governments across the world to spread atheism and communism.

Riḍā believed that the term "freemason" itself referred to the re-construction of Solomon's Temple in Jerusalem. He claimed and emphasized that while the founders of Freemasonry came from both Judaism and Christianity, the Jewish people led and dominated the movement. He also argued that Jewish people wielded immense influence over the Committee of Union and the treasury of the Ottoman Empire. Within two years of the Young Turk Revolution, Riḍā convinced that the Ottoman Empire had succumbed to a "Zionist-Masonic influence." He issued a fatwa in 1933 forbidding Muslims from selling land to Jewish people in Palestine, ruling that such sales represented the "betrayal of Islam" and complicity with Zionism. Although Riḍā's theology was ideologically at odds with Nazi doctrines, he commended them for ridding the world of heresies and false beliefs, as this would allow for the ultimate triumph of the Islamic faith. Riḍā also viewed Kemalism and communism as the immediate enemies of Islam, both of which were directly threatening Muslim territories. Fervent anti-Zionism linked with themes of Judeo-Bolshevism were a predominant component of Rida's writings until his death.

=== Christianity ===
Riḍā was highly sensitive to the openly hostile and Islamophobic attitudes prevalent among Orientalists and European Christians of his era. Before promoting the vision of a caliphate as a means of Islamic revival, Riḍā was trying to counteract the activities of Christian missionaries, who had founded a society for organised Islamic da'wah outside of Islamic Ottoman territories. He was also concerned by what he regarded as sympathies of native Arab Christians to colonial powers. Riḍā believed the only 'true' mission of solid faith in Christian history was that of Jesus' disciples and that any later missionary attempt was false. He perceived Christian missions as an integral part of the colonial presence in the Muslim world and was convinced that Europe used religion as a political instrument for mobilising European Christians by inflaming their 'fanatic' feelings against other nations. Rashid Rida also addressed the topic of the Crusades, following Muhammad Abduh, noting the importance of the ennobling influence of Islamic civilization on Christian Europe, which gave impetus to the development of Europe, and ultimately turned out to be more important than the military defeat of the Crusades.

In spite of this, Rida did promote efforts to reconcile between Muslims and Christians. His caliphate proposal recognised both Judaism and Christianity and granted non-Muslims the right to serve in administration and the judicial system, with the exception of the Islamic sharia courts.

Habib Jamati said in his eulogy for Riḍā that Riḍā "had also befriended Christians and struggled alongside them for their common nation." He did, however, accuse Oriental Christians in general of being the tools of colonial powers and of conspiring with "atheist Westerners" against Islam. In a series of articles published in 1911 compiled under the title al-Muslimun wa-l-qubt (The Muslims and the Copts), he condemned Muslims for dividing over nationalism. In his view, nationalist slogans were exploited by the colonial powers and would only favor the Coptic minority. He mocked the Copts' claim to be descended from the "heathen, God-hating" Pharaohs and their demand for positions of power despite what he viewed as inexperience. Riḍā applauded the 1911 Muslim Congress, which was organised in response to the 1911 Congress of Asyut that demanded Coptic minority rights. He believed Western civilisation could not be considered Christian, only materialistic, and predicted that its vices would lead to self-destruction. He alleged that the West sought to turn Muslims away from their religion, either by degrading their moral values, converting them to Christianity, or both.

=== Shi'ism and Baháʼí ===
Riḍā gradually became a sharp critic of Shi'ism throughout his life. In a 1929 book, he wrote that he was once willing to work with the balanced reformers among Shias but that the situation has changed. He alleged that they "worship the dead," attributing to their incessionary practices towards Awliyaa in their shrines. He called upon Shias to condemn these practices and, while he did not censure all Shias, he left them with few options but to comply. Pan-Islamic unity was still conceivable, but it had to be on Salafi terms. In 1927, following heightened communal tensions, al-Manar published a series of anti-Shi'i articles written by Riḍā's disciple Muhammad Taqi ud din al-Hilali.

Rida condemned the Shia for "supporting the Tatar and Crusader invasions" and alleged that Raafidi doctrines were formulated by a Jewish-Zoroastrian conspiracy aimed at "perverting Islam and weakening the Arabs." Rida called upon "moderate Shi'is" to dissociate themselves from the stagnant Shia clergy and condemn intercessory practices such as beseeching their religious figures from the Ahl al-Bayt and Awliyaa in their graves, which he equated with polytheism. He thought this was the only way they would be incorporated into the pan-Islamic ecumenical paradigm. Despite all of this, Riḍā heavily influence modern Shiite exegesis. His prolific Quaranic commentary, Tafsir, is studied by both Sunni and Shiite scholars.

Riḍā considered the Baháʼí Faith to be a completely separate religion from Islam with its own laws. He thought they to be polytheists and esotericists pretending to be Muslim and that they were a destructive internal threat to Islam. He saw Abduh's friendship with Baháʼí leader 'Abdu'l-Baha Abbas as a betrayal to Islam.

=== Women ===
Riḍā believed that men and women were treated equally in Islam in terms of spiritual obligations and their ability to earn God's favor. To support Islamic gender roles, which defined a woman's position in both household and society, he pointed to issues such as sexual freedom, women's exploitation in the workplace, and the rising cases of illegitimate children, which he thought were all creating problems in European societies. He believed these gender roles represented the proper solution to these social problems, and that, while men are heads of the household, Muslim women were allowed to choose a spouse and were clearly given stipulated rights and responsibilities in a marriage. He also asserted that consent from the male guardian of a woman was essential for a marriage to be valid, since it stabilised the domestic order and befits the honor of both women and men. He criticised followers of the Hanafi school who didn't adhere to this stipulation as bigoted partisans to mad'habs guilty of abandoning the Qur'an and sunnah in favour of their law schools.

Riḍā was also a firm defender of traditional Islamic views on polygamy, presenting it as a solution to the emerging social ills afflicting societies, such as free mixing of men and women in workplaces and consequent sexual freedoms. In one of his last treatises, A Call to the Fair Sex (1932), he argued that polygamy not only solved the problems associated with promiscuity and its resultant evils, but also addressed the difficulties produced by the loss of men in war. The book condemned the calls for equality between men and women in the workplace and in politics and warned about the folly of imitating Western women in their misguided ways. Rida declared that calls for "the liberation of women" and other social reforms by the modernisers were destroying the very fabric of Islamic societies. Riḍā discussed the etiquettes of veiling, emphasizing modesty for Muslim women, and addressed legal issues such as divorce. Although Riḍā wanted Muslim women not to be involved in politics, he encouraged association-based female Islamic activism that called upon the government to outlaw free-mixing, wine-drinking, and fronts of prostitution, and demanded expansion of Islamic education for both males and females. In marital affairs, he held the view that wives were not obliged to cook, clean, or take care of their children in sharia and decried the hypocrisy of men who demanded more from their wives. Still, he believed husbands could discipline their wives using force, if necessary.

Riḍā encouraged Muslim women to participate in the social life of Islam as they did in earlier Islamic eras, but stressed that men were more capable and superior in terms of strength, intelligence, learning, and physical labour, which is why they have legal guardianship over women. However, like a ruler over his subjects, male authority should be exercised through shura and that they should strive to be like Muhammad, who exemplified kind treatment of wives. Riḍā also defended Islamic slavery, asserting that it protected women from harm and gave everyone chance to bear children, and therefore is not in conflict with justice. Riḍā wrote that every woman should have a legal guardian, so that women who are "prevented from being wife or mother [are] not thereby prevented from enjoying protection and honour." He felt that Muslim men, but not Muslim women, could marry non-Muslims to expand the reach of Islam.

=== On riba ===
Riḍā considered that certain types of usury (riba) may be permitted in certain cases, such as extreme poverty or larger public interest. He was influenced by both ibn Qayyim and Abduh in his beliefs about riba, though some of the beliefs he glossed from Abduh were tweaked to fit his agenda. Riḍā believed that only the first increase in a termed loan was permissible in sharia, classifying it as riba al-fadl, a term used by ibn Qayyim. Based on his analysis of the reports in Tafsir al Tabari that described the practice of riba during the pre-Islamic period, Riḍā distinguished the former from the usury practised during the pre-Islamic period (Ribā Âl-Jāhilīyyá). However, he considered any further increase in returns or postponement of maturity date unlawful. Riḍā wrote that riba rendered capitalism fundamentally at odds with an Islamic system as it directly violated Divine command.

When state-sponsored Turkish translations of the Qur'an in the newly established Turkish Republic were published in 1924, Riḍā characterised the project as a long-term plot to displace the Arabic Qur'an and to tamper with Islamic rituals. He wrote that Mustafa Kemal's regime promoted heretical ideas to undermine Islam and that God "revealed it to the Arabian Prophet Muhammad in the clear Arabic tongue." Riḍā issued a fatwa prohibiting Qur'anic translations. Among his objections were that identical translation of the Qur'an was impossible; translation would serve to sever "Islamic ties of unity" by stoking racial divisions; and the translation would be lesser in quality, as the reader would be "limited" by the translator's understanding. He was clear, however, that the prohibition was only on translations meant to substitute the Arabic Qur'an. He viewed the Arabic language as the common medium uniting Muslims of all nations and promoted Arabic as an integral pillar of his reform efforts and later issued a fatwa stipulating that knowledge of Arabic is obligatory for every Muslim.

=== Law and government ===
Riḍā believed that sharia was intended and suited to be a comprehensive legal structure for Islamic society. He wrote that fixed Shar'i principles in muamalat (social transactions) were of only a general character, allowing for considerable adaptation by successive generations of Muslims to understand their modern problems. Ibadah (governing matters of ritual and worship), on the other hand, did not allow for interpretive change. Riḍā believed that the Hanafi principle of istihsan (ruling in which a benefit to the community is confirmed) is essentially an application of the spirit. However, he expanded the legal realm of the ibadah to incorporate personal and civil laws, including marriage and divorce.

Riḍā divided muamalat into moral issues and morally irrelevant issues. The former are similar to ibadat rules, moral norms defined by God, therefore making them unchangeable. Violators of these rules, he thought, were sinful transgressors. The latter could be solved through the process of analogical reasoning, or Qiyas, which is a fundamental principle necessary for the relevant application to the law. Medieval jurists such as al-Qarafi and ibn Taymiyya considered istislah as a logical extension of Qiyas, whereby a consideration of utility neither explicitly enjoined nor excluded by the revealed texts would be assumed as a valid basis for judgment. Riḍā adopted this rationale, acknowledging that conclusions of istislah were not legally binding as a firmly-grounded Qiyas (as opposed to Qiyas without precise textual basis), as "no individual is entitled to require or forbid others to perform an act without Divine authorization".

He believed that this rationale did not prevent the government from enacting ordinances based on utility in public policy, provided that the government rested on proper shura among qualified authorities, and that these ordinances did not conflict with Divine Revelation. Based on writings from al-Shatibi, Riḍā suggested that most legal rulings could be reached through istislah rather than the more meticulous process of Qiyas. In reference to al-Qarafi, he wrote that many scholars feared that tyrants would use public interest as an excuse for following their desires and imposing absolutism upon their population. Riḍā's conclusion was that politics had to be reformed so decisions of public policy and law would be up to a qualified body (ahl al-hall wal-aqd or ulul amr) through mutual consultation. This, he thought, would negate the fear that public interest could be a means for corruption, thus lifting the restrictions on deduction of legal ordinances. Overturning muamalat rulings were predicated on the condition of compulsion (darurah) and were only to be undertaken by a competent jurist, who may derive the appropriate ruling based on his ijtihad.

Riḍā thought that the best possible way to bring about a strong caliphate was through a detailed application "of the rules of the Shariah." One of these rules involved the appointment of ahl al-hal wa-l 'aqd, a group of Muslim representatives with the right to take council with a caliph and the power to both appoint and remove him of behalf of the community. As the state would use Islamic law as its guiding principle, scholars were not only responsible for the sacred mission of reforming the society, but also responsible for correcting the monarch, by holding him accountable to sharia. Jurors were also to engage in ijtihad by referring to the Scriptures, and evaluate contemporary conditions to enhance the vitality of the law.

Drawing on Hanbali and Shafi'i legal traditions that supported the continuity of ijtihad, Riḍā employed its doctrine into practice. He defined the application of ijtihad strictly in terms of "pure adherence to the provisions of the Qur'an and sunnah and upon the understanding of the Salaf" and restricted its scope by enforcing the authority of scholarly consensus. This position was a middle-ground between the modernist conceptualisation of ijtihad as an all-inclusive creative endeavour, and the minimalist view which restricted it to a narrow legal spectrum of mad'hab partisanship. During Riḍā's life, when taqlid tradition was predominant, fatwas (religious rulings) were not issued by ijtihad. He began this practice in 1903 by answering questions sent in by readers to al-Manar. He viewed fatwas as his ijtihad. This act imparted a major influence on future Islamic revivalist movements. Although Riḍā believed that ijtihad was unlawful in the realm of Islamic theology, he sought to tone down the religious hostilities between Salafis, Asharis, and Maturidis, as well as between Sunnis, Ibadis, and Shi'is. He called upon all Muslims to unite by taking the Salaf as their role models. Early issues of al-Manar emphasized the virtues of the Salaf and extolled their feats, such as their intellectual dynamism and especially the early Islamic conquests. Riḍā believed that the period of the early Muslim community epitomized pristine Islam to its perfection.

However, Riḍā was clear in specifying that general principles cannot supersede clear-cut texts. He stated that a soundly transmitted Scriptural text could only be superseded by a specific text which is more superior or by general texts of Qur'an and authentic hadiths that allow believers to prevent damage to themselves or to commit prohibited actions in a state of emergencies. He wrote that this permission was only valid during cases of extreme necessity and that the degree of allowance was proportional to the scope of necessity. Maintaining that Revealed texts were superior to maslaha, Rida's legal approach towards them was based on the criterion and mechanisms elaborated by classical jurists such as al-Shatibi and al-Tufi. In addition, Riḍā's legal doctrine continued the juristic traditions of a number of prominent jurists between the 10th and 14th centuries such as al-Ghazali, Fakhr al-Din al-Razi, al-Qarafi, and ibn Taymiyyah. During these four centuries, Islamic jurists had commonly employed maslaha as an amenity for legal resolution and juristic dynamism. As Riḍā saw it, the classical jurists had sufficiently elaborated the "philosophical, moral and hermeneutical controls" for valid use of the principles of maslaha. Riḍā credited al-Ghazali and al-Shatibi for his revivalism of maslaha, which revamped the principle within the traditional legal framework of Qiyas.

Riḍā's doctrines were later extended by modernists to uphold maslaha as an independent legal source, making Qiyas dispensable and formulating positive laws directly on utilitarian grounds, for the "wisdom behind the Revealed Laws is no longer inscrutable," which created new implications. Riḍā vehemently denounced these ideas and Egyptian lawyer Ahmed Safwat for promoting "non-adherence" to the Qur'an and sunna, in particular matters in the name of public utility. Though Riḍā believed that mujtahids were obliged to take a broad view of all considerations affecting the public interest, "textual limits" had to be respected. The general public was obliged to follow the qualified mujtahids unquestionably on wordly Transactions and their consensus was a legal source (hujja shar'iyya).

=== Politics ===
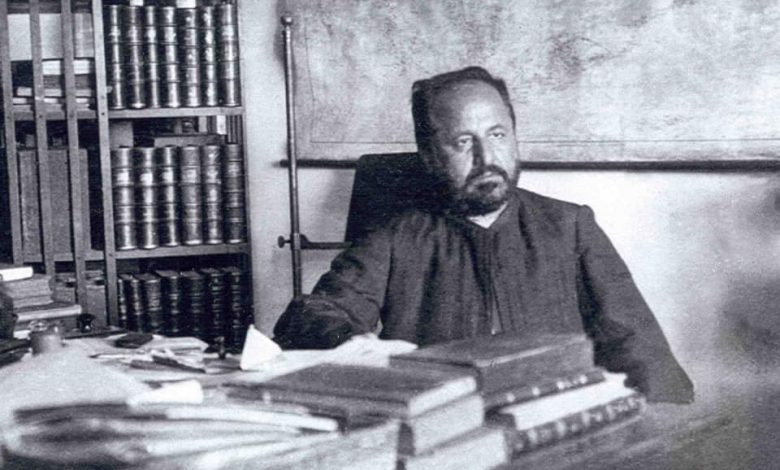
Riḍā sitting in his library (date unclear)

Riḍā believed that problems faced by Muslims required political reform and his anti-imperialism was characterized by radical pan-Islamist stances. Riḍā contended that those who engaged in defence of Islam, its propagation, and its teaching should not engage in politics, in line with orthodox Sunni doctrine, though he was also vehemently against secularist calls for separation of religion and state. The corruption and tyranny of Muslim rulers throughout history was a central theme in his criticisms. He celebrated the rule of Muhammad and the Rightly Guided Caliphs, and leveled his attacks at subsequent rulers who could not maintain Muhammad's example. He thought it was feudal monarchs and depraved scholars who ruined the ideal caliphate system, leading to social chaos and the institutionalisation of corruption of authoritarian rulers. He also blamed the weakness and corruption of Muslim societies on Sufist pacifism and excess, the blind imitation of the past (taqlid), the stagnation of the scholars, and the resulting failure to achieve progress in science and technology. He criticized Islamic scholars for compromising their integrity, and the integrity of the Islamic law, by associating with corrupt worldly powers.

In advocating the restoration of the caliphate, he reiterated the unity of both the spiritual and temporal aspects of Islam, which was in direct opposition to the emerging tides of secularism across the Arab and Turkish worlds. He suggested conditions necessary for the revival of the ideal caliphal rule and proposed ways to prevent the return to the Ottoman imperial system. Instead of criticising Sufism based on its perceived role in the Islamic historical scheme, Riḍā opposed Sufis because he considered their activities to be innovations without textual precedents or any sanction in the practices of the earliest generations.

Riḍā opposed secularist criticisms accusing religion of being responsible for wars and human suffering, asserting that the materialist and irreligious conceptions of humanity were the prime instigators of warfare and bloodshed throughout history. In Riḍā's view, wars were an integral component of human history, and Islamic law regulated conflicts to just wars based on the doctrine of Jihad. He praised the religious campaigns of Muhammad and Rashidun Caliphate as an exemplary model of Jihad to be emulated against the European imperial powers. He saw Jihad as a binding duty for all capable male Muslims, not only to defend the religion but also to bring non-Muslims into the Islamic faith. However, since the obligation of Jihad could only be fulfilled by strong men, the more immediate task was to acquire scientific and technical knowledge. Riḍā nonetheless distinguished between wars to spread Islam (Jihad al-Talab) and wars to defend Islam (Jihad al-Daf). While the latter was always obligatory, the expansion of Islam into non-Muslim territories was not obligatory unless Muslims were not allowed to live according to sharia or unless Islamic preaching efforts were hampered by the non-Muslim state.

Riḍā's final substantial treatise, The Muhammadan Revelation (al-Waḥī al-Muḥammadī), published in 1933, was a manifesto in which he proclaimed that Islam was the only saviour for the deteriorating West. Insisting that Islam called for the unity of all people, opposing all forms of racist hierarchies that were responsible for the World War I and the corrupted League of Nations, Riḍā presented a Universal Islamic Order as a substitute for the crumbling Wilsonian system. He wrote that "[w]hen Islam came into the world, humankind was widely divided; on the basis of origin, color, language, geography, religion, tribal affiliation, government, and politics. Moreover, on the basis of anyone of these differences, humans went to war." He asserted that Islam was widespread during the first century of the Muhammadan Revelation and blamed ignorance and tyranny for stymieing an Islamic state at that time.

== Influence and legacy ==
Rashid Riḍā is widely regarded as one of "the ideological forefathers" of contemporary Islamist movements and many of his ideas were foundational to the development of the modern Islamic state. He "was an important link between classical theories of the caliphate... and 20th-century notions of the Islamic state." Though Riḍā held some unconventional ideas, his work was highly influential. Salafi scholar Albani wrote that al-Manar was "a good nucleus that drew the attention of Muslims to take care of the hadiths of the Prophet Peace be upon him."

The status of Riḍā and his works, however, are a matter of contention among some contemporary purist Salafis, who disagree with his idea that rulers who legislate man-made laws contrary to sharia are guilty of kufr akbar (major non-belief) and that Muslims are obliged to force rulers to annul such laws; overthrow them; or lose the land's status as Dar-al-Islam (abode of Islam). Some Salafi Purists criticise Riḍā for straying from quietist Salafi principles. The pro-government Madkhali Salafists condemn Riḍā for his influence on Salafi activists, Islamists, and Salafi-Jihadists. Others, however, including Salafi scholars such as Albani, generally praise him and popularised his treatises in Jordan, while also making commentaries on Rida's works. Ali al-Halabi, a disciple of Albani, has praised Riḍā for his contributions to Salafi revival in Jordan. Salafi activists (harakis) also used Riḍā's works to build a revivalist platform focused on Islamic socio-political and cultural reforms (Islah) with a long-term objective to establish an Islamic state. Prominent figures in this rival camp include Abu Hanieh, Safar al-Hawali, Abu Qatada, Muhammad Surur, and Abdurrahman Abdulkhaliq. Abu Qatada and Abu Hanieh established a Jordan-based movement known as Ahl Al-Sunnah Wal Jama'a and published a new al-Manar magazine to commemorate Riḍā's monthly publication.

Riḍā's political doctrines deeply influenced Islamists like Hasan al-Banna and Sayyid Qutb, as well as subsequent fundamentalist movements across the Arab world. Al-Banna was highly influenced by Riḍā's Salafism movement as well his pan-Islamist activities through socio-political means to re-generate an Islamic state and established the Muslim Brotherhood, a mass political party which sought to establish an Islamic state in Egypt within the existing constitutional framework. The movement demanded the Egyptian government to recognize sharia as the supreme source of law and remove the European law codes. Riḍā's anti-Western sentiments set the foundations of future Salafi-Jihadist ideologies.

Riḍā published Majmuʿat al-rasaʾil wa al-masaʾil al-najdiyya (Collection of Treatises and Questions from Najd) in 1928; this was one of the earliest occurrences wherein the doctrine of loyalty and disavowal was emphasised alongside tawhid in the Salafi context. This doctrine in particular later became important in militant Jihadist circles. Riḍā's Islamic state theory was adopted by Usama Bin Laden and Ayman al Zawahiri, who followed the terminology used by Riḍā and later by Hasan al-Banna to differentiate between an Islamic State and the caliphate. In contrast to other Islamist movements like Hizb ut-Tahrir, who believed the caliphate to be the only valid government, the two Al-Qaeda leaders believed in the legitimacy of multiple Islamic national states, referring to them as Emirates, such as the Islamic Emirate of Afghanistan and Saudi Arabia, until the 1990s, when, according to Bin Laden, it lost legitimacy. Riḍā's strategy to establish an Islamic State is also believed to have influenced ISIS in their 2014 declaration of caliphate in Mosul.

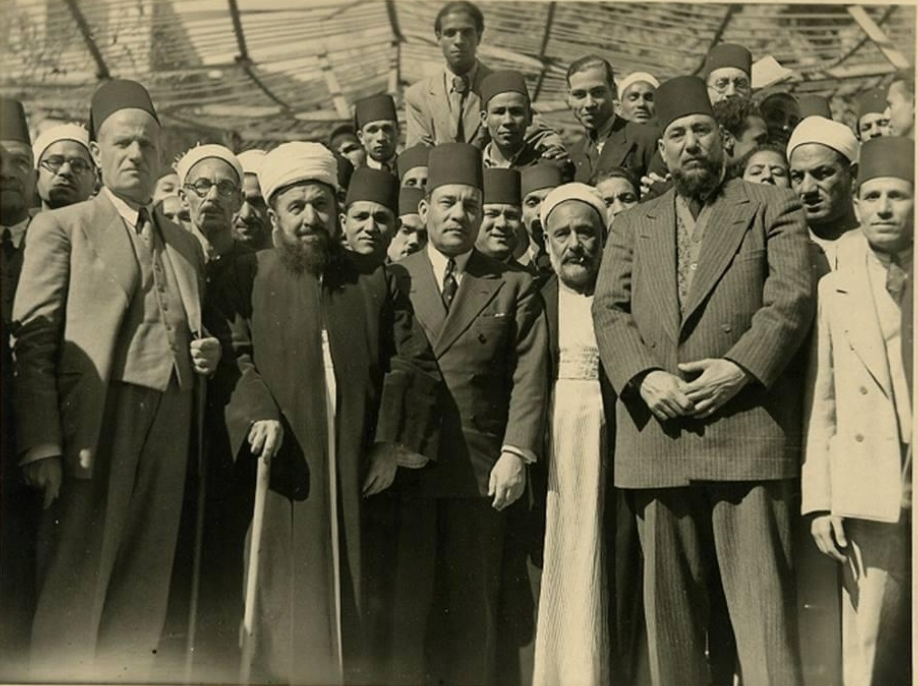
A rare photo of Riḍā accompanied by his acolytes

Under Saudi rule, Sufi institutions in Mecca were closed and replaced with Riḍā's Salafi comrades and Najdi scholars. In 1961, the Islamic University of Medina was founded and served as an international seminary for the propagation of Salafi da'wa. Riḍā's efforts were instrumental in fostering the modern transnational network of Salafi scholarship across the world. Early Salafi Egyptian scholars built extensive relations with Wahhabi scholars through education, travel, and religious gatherings. These scholars would continue writing to condemn innovations and various Sufi practices within the theological framework laid down by ibn Taymiyyah, the Najdis, and Riḍā. Their organisation, Ansar al-Sunnah al Muhammadiyyah, became the bastion of Salafism schooling in Egypt. Riḍā and his Salafi disciples also formed the Young Men's Muslim Association (YMMA), an Islamist youth organisation that spearheaded attacks against liberalism and Western cultural trends, in the 1920s.

In his treatise The Exoneration written in response to Sayyed Imam Al-Sharif, Salafi-jihadist leader Ayman al-Zawahiri cited Riḍā's anti-colonial fatwa, which he issued to condemn the Tunisian naturalization issue, to argue that a Muslim who applies for Western citizenship by his own choice is guilty of non-belief. Islamic scholar Yusuf al-Qaradawi described Riḍā as "the true mujaddid of Islam of his time" and viewed him as the most prominent scholar who advocated traditionalism in contemporary Islamic history. Qaradawi described Rida's thought as a "lighthouse" that "guided the ship of Islam in modern history". The Egyptian Salafi hadith scholar Ahmad Shakir conferred the title of Hujjat al-Islam to Riḍā and extolled his Qur'anic commentary Tafsir al-Manar as a "real defense of religion" in the contemporary era, encouraging everyone to read it and spread its message. Saudi scholar ibn 'Uthaymeen listed Riḍā as his chief source of scholarly influence alongside ibn Taymiyyah and commended him as an exemplar scholar of sharia who had the combined knowledge of religious sciences as well political and economic affairs.

Riḍā's religious efforts not only influenced the Arab world, but also made major impact in South Asia and Southeast Asia. Riḍā received requests for fatwas from his followers in Indonesia and Southeast Asia and answered them through al-Manar. These fatwas were regarded by the indigenous reform-oriented scholars as their main source of inspiration and became influential in shaping the intellectual thought of religious circles in 20th century Indonesia, introducing them to Salafi reformist ideals. The influential Salafi activist organisation Islamic Assembly of North America (IANA), which played a crucial role in the spread of Salafism across North America, drew inspiration from Riḍā. The official publication of the organisation was a magazine titled al-Manar al-Jadid ("the New Lighthouse") in honour of his legacy; they stated that the Muslim community continued to face "the same tribulations" as during Riḍā's era. The organisation included notable scholars and figures like Bilal Philips, Muhammad Adly, Jamal Zarabozo, and Abdel Rahman al-Dosari. After 9/11, IANA was subject to intense federal scrutiny and was eventually forced to disband; many members were deported, and others, like Ali al-Timimi, were jailed.

Riḍā was an important source for many 20th century Salafi scholars, including al-Hilali, al-Khatib, al-Qasimi, ibn Uthaymin, Abdur Razzaq Malihabadi, Vakkam Abdul Qadir Moulavi, and, most notably, al-Albani.

== Selected works ==
Published works by Riḍā include:

- 1922–23: Al-Khilafa aw al-Imama al-'Uzma (The Caliphate or the Supreme Imamate)
- 1928: Yusr al-Islam wa Uskl al-Tashri' al-'Āmm (The Accommodating Spirit of Islam and the Sources of General Jurisprudence)
- 1984: Mukhtasar Tafsir al-Manar (originally Al-Tafsir al-Mukhtasar al-Mufid) – intended to be a summary of his work, started by Riḍā and published by Muhammad Ahmad Kan'an and Zuhayr al-Shawish in three volumes.
- Tafsir al-Qur'an al-Hakim – Quranic commentary initially written by Abduh but continued by Riḍā, after his death. Riḍā wrote from surat al-Nisa' IV, verse 125 to surat Yusuf XII, verse 100 but did not complete the book either.
- Tarikh al-Ustaz al-Imam al-Shaykh Muhammad 'Abduh – a three-volume biography of Muhammad Abduh
- Nida' lil Jins al-Latif or Huqkq al-Mar'ah fi al-Islam (A Call to the Fair Sex)
- Al-Wahy al-Muhammadi – rational and historical proofs indicating that the Qur'an is a Divine Revelation
- Dhikra al-Mawlid al-Nabawi – summary of a Prophetic biography
- Al-Wahda al-Islamiiyya (Islamic Unity) (initially Muhawarat al-Muslih wa al-Muqallid; Debates between the Reformer and the Imitator)
- Al-Sunna wa al-Shari'a (The Prophetic Tradition and Islamic Law)
- Al-Muslimin wa al-Qibt (Muslims and the Copts)
- Al-Wahhabiyyun wa al-Hijaz (The Wahhabites and the Hijaz)

== See also ==
- List of Islamic scholars
