= Ali Abdel Raziq =

Egyptian Islam scholar, judge and government minister

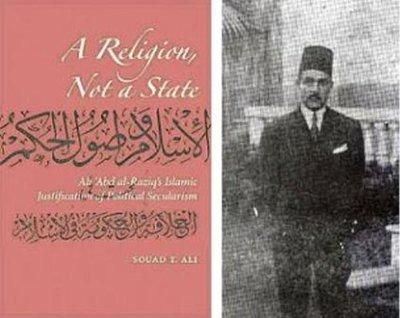
Ali Abdel Raziq

Ali Abdel Raziq (Arabic: ﻋﻠﻲ ﻋﺒﺪ ﺍﻟﺮﺍﺯﻕ) (1888–1966) was an Egyptian scholar of Islam, judge and government minister. His writings, some controversial, debated the role of religion and Islamic history in 20th-century politics and government.

While the implication of his arguments still remain a point of debate, his 1925 book Islam and the Foundations of Governance argued against a role for religion in politics or the political prescriptive value of religious texts.

He argued that Islamic texts were and should remain neutral in political debate and civil institution building. He attended Oxford University, and he was a scholar and jurist at Al-Azhar, Cairo.

== Biography ==
Ali Abdel Raziq was born in Minya Governorate in 1888 to a well-off family. His father, Hassan Abdel Raziq, was of Arab origin. He was a large farm-owner and was, in 1907, among the founders of the Hizb al-Umma, an influential political party in early-20th century Egypt. Ali Abdel Raziq's mother was of North African origin. His brother, Mustafa Abd al-Raziq, a well known philosopher, studied at Al-Azhar University under the famous reformer Muhammad Abduh.

He later received his 'alim degree from Al-Azhar in 1911. In 1912, he traveled to Oxford University to study economics and political science, but he returned to Cairo at the outbreak of the First World War.

Back at Al-Azhar in 1915, he became a qadi (religious judge) in Mansoura. Ali became famous for his book Islam and the Foundations of Governance (Al-Islam wa Usul al-Hukm), published in 1925, and Consensus and Islamic Law (Al-Ijma´ fi ash-Shari´ah al-Islamiyyah), published in 1947.

Following popular debate about his 1925 book, Al-Azhar stripped him of his office, but he got it back in the 1940s. Ali, his father and his brother remained close to the Liberal Constitutional Party. He eventually became a government minister and lost his position as scholar and jurist at Al-Azhar.

He twice served as Minister of Endowments, one of the three highest positions in religious administration, beside the Rector of Al-Azhar and the Grand Mufti. He died in 1966.

== Work ==
The argument of his 1925 book has been summarized as "Islam does not advocate a specific form of government." He focused his criticism both at those who use religious law as contemporary political proscription and at the history of rulers claiming legitimacy by the caliphate.

The focus of this debate was Turkish leader Mustafa Kemal's abolition of the caliphate in 1924, and the response of some Arab Muslim scholars that it was incumbent upon Arabs, in particular, to reinstate the caliphate in Arab lands.

He wrote that past rulers spread the notion of religious justification for the caliphate "so that they could use religion as a shield protecting their thrones against the attacks of rebels."

The journalistic and academic debate that his book set off projected him into fame.

The thesis Islam and the Foundations of Governance (Al-Islam wa Usul al-Hukm) was published recently by Hamed, the grandson of Abdel Raziq, with a familial introduction.

He remains controversial, and his specific arguments are part of a longer tradition of jurisprudence and scripture. His work has since been both praised and condemned, as a precursor of secularist philosophy in Muslim societies.

It has been criticized as having drawn on the works of Orientalist western writers.

== Secularism ==
He was regarded as the intellectual father of Islamic secularism (the separation of state and religion, not the secularization of society).

Its controversial standpoints regarding the necessity of the caliphate and religious government made the book trigger an intellectual and political battle in Egypt. In essence, it claims that the Muslims may agree on any kind of government, religious or worldly, as long as it serves the interest and common welfare of their society.

=== Arguments ===
- The two main sources of Islamic law (Sharia), the Quran and the Sunnah (the tradition of Muhammad), neither demand nor reject the rule of a caliph or imam.
- There is no real ijma (consensus) on the necessity of the caliphate.
- Experience shows that the caliphate was a series of disasters for the Muslim community, and there is no single rational argument for the re-establishment of the caliphate.

As he recounts the horrors of the caliphate, among other things, one can conclude that he advocated a humanist kind of governance, probably a democratic state.

The word 'secular' entered the Arab lexicon at the turn of the 20th century, bringing with it a host of meanings and interpretations. It was first introduced into Arab discourse, as a reference to the separation between religion and state. That later evolved to become "la dini", irreligious.

In current circles, secularism is often both understood as "almaniya" and associated with immorality or the lack of ethics.

== Criticism ==
Syrian Islamic theologian Muhammad Rashid Rida (d. 1935) was one of the most fierce critics of 'Ali Abd al-Raziq and his ideas. Rida described the reaction to his controversial work al-Islam wa 'Usul al-Hukm [Islam and the Foundations of Political Power] to the "sudden arrival of the Day of Judgment". Through Al-Manar, Rashid Rida charged 'Abd al-Raziq with blasphemy and kufr (disbelief) that no Batini, Mu'tazili, or Jahmi have ever uttered before. Excommunicating 'Ali Abd al-Raziq as an apostate (murtad), Rida praised the Azhari court verdict stripping Abd al-Raziq of his scholarly titles as a "great manifest victory for the believers over the atheists". Rida condemned the work as:

“...a destruction and uprooting of the Islamic regime and its legislation; a tearing apart of its community, and a complete endorsement of disobedience of Allah and His messenger and all religious rules pertaining to the secular order, whether personal, political, civil or criminal ... it considers ignorant all generations of Muslims: The Companions, Successors, Imams, Mujtahids, Hadith scholars, and theologians. All in all, it calls for taking a path other than that of the believers, one at a conflict with Islam as it is understood by Muslims from the first generations to the present."

== See also ==
- Muhammad Bakhit al-Muti'i
- Mustafa Sabri
- Muhammad Rashid Rida

== Writings ==
- Abdel Raziq, Ali: Al-Islam Wa Usul Al-Hukm: Bahth Fi-l Khilafa Wa-l Hukuma Fi-l Islam (Islam and the Foundations of Governance: Research on the Caliphate and Governance in Islam). Critique and commentary by Mamdooh Haqqi (Beirut, 1978).
- Abdel Razek, A., trans. by Loutfi, M., ed. Filali-Ansary, A. Islam and the Foundations of Political Power. In Translation: Modern Muslim Thinkers Vol. 2. Aga Khan University-Institute for the Study of Muslim Civilisations (AKU-ISMC) / Edinburgh University Press, 2013.
