= Al-Qalamoun =

Town in Tripoli District, Lebanon

Al-Qalamoun القلمون
- City
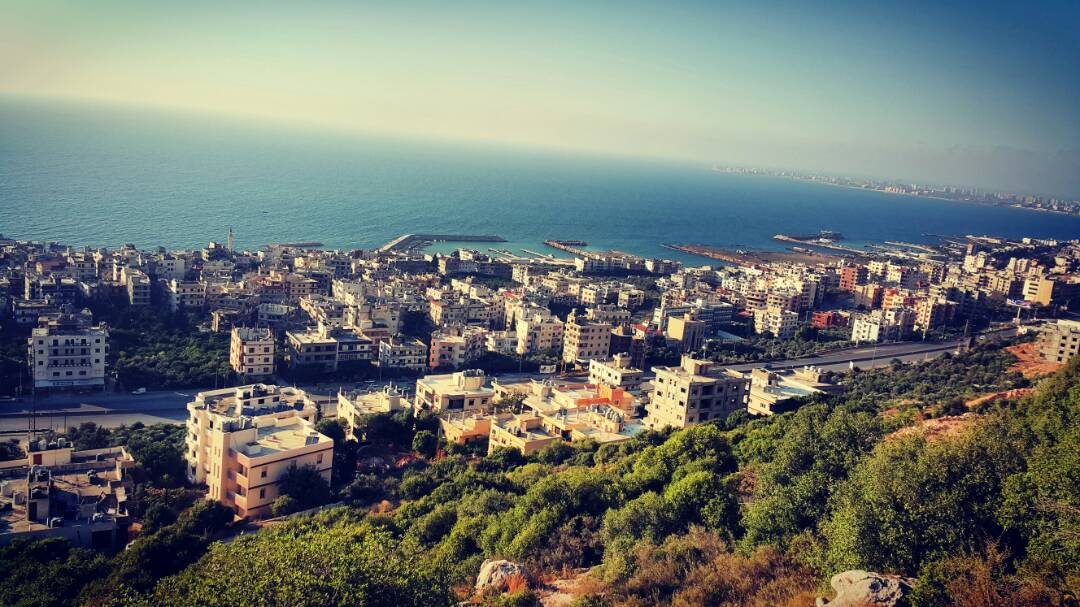
- Al-Qalamoun

- Location within Lebanon
- Coordinates: 34.3833°N 35.7833°E
- Country: Lebanon
- Governorate: North Governorate
- District: Tripoli District

Government
  - Mayor: Talal Hashem Dunke

Area
  - Total: 3.18 km^{2} (1.23 sq mi)

Population
  - Total: 7,000
  - Density: 2,200/km^{2} (5,700/sq mi)
- Demonym: Qalamouni
- Time zone: UTC+2 (EET)
  - Summer (DST): UTC+3 (EEST)
- Dialing code: + 06401 and +06400
- Website: Official website

Al-Qalamoun (Arabic: القلمون, romanized: al-Qalamūn) is a Mediterranean seaside town of the North Governorate of Lebanon in the Tripoli District. The town is 5 km south of Tripoli and is also the first town south of Tripoli.

== Name ==
During Greco-Roman times Al-Qalamoun was known as Kalamos or Kalomo, while during the Crusades the town was known as Calmont or Calamón.

Other modern day names for Al-Qalamoun include: El-Qalmoun, Al-Qalamun, El-Qalmoûn, Al-Qalamūn and El-Qalamoûn.

== History ==
Al-Qalamoun has a history spanning 5000 years and during its history was an agricultural village.

In modern times it has become a center for metal smiths working in copper, brass and bronze. This occurred after metal workers and artisans from Tripoli's Souk an-Nahhassine (ar: "سوقُ ٱلنَّحّاسينِ", the traditional market of Tripoli) moved to Al-Qalamoun several decades ago.

== Buildings ==
In Al-Qalamoun there exists an old mosque known as the mosque of the sea "جامِع ٱلبَحْر". As circulated among the citizens of the town, the mosque dates back to about 800 years ago. This is ascertained by a three-line tablet pasted on the wall besides the pulpit (527 A.H./1132 C.E.). This date coincides with the time during which Tripoli was under the Crusaders' rule. The mosque was restored by Sheikh Ali al-Baghdadi (d. 1192 A.H./1778 C.E.). The mosque is composed of two large halls. It was constructed using sandstone, as in the case of the mosques in Tripoli. The upper side of the wall has adorned cornices and above the mosque is a new minaret.

South from the mosque of the sea is the Ayn el-Jami'i prayer house. As circulated among the citizens of the city, the mosque dates back to the Crusaders. Muslims constructed this place near a water source, then it developed into a prayer house, then became the Ayn Mosque. A charitable association transformed the mosque into a theological school.

== Climate ==
The table below displays average monthly climate indicators in Al-Qalamoun based on 8 years of historical weather readings.

Climate data for Al-Qalamoun, Lebanon
Month	Jan	Feb	Mar	Apr	May	Jun	Jul	Aug	Sep	Oct	Nov	Dec	Year
Mean daily maximum °C (°F)	16 (61)	17 (63)	18 (64)	21 (70)	25 (77)	28 (82)	30 (86)	30 (86)	29 (84)	26 (79)	22 (72)	18 (64)	23 (73)
Mean daily minimum °C (°F)	8 (46)	7 (45)	10 (50)	12 (54)	16 (61)	19 (66)	22 (72)	22 (72)	21 (70)	17 (63)	12 (54)	10 (50)	15 (59)
Average precipitation days	6	4	4	2	0	0	0	0	0	2	2	4	24
Source: climate-zone.com/

== Economy ==
The main street (avenue) in the town is lined with small workshops and showrooms where brass bowls, candlesticks and other objects are produced (hammered out) in the old traditional way. A good look around these shops can reveal interesting antique pieces as well. Roadside stands also sell olive oil products and fruit juices and syrups made from cranberry, mulberry, lemon, orange and other juices. Al-Qalamoun is also famous for distilled flower and rose essences, that are used to add a nice flavor and smell to sweets. The town is also known for the Jazariyyeh (a kind of sweet made of pumpkin ).

== Demographics ==
The residents of Al-Qalamoun are mostly Sunni Muslims and number a few thousand people of different religions as Christianity. They represented 97.72% of the local registered voters in 2014.

== Notable people ==
Some notable people born in or descending from Al-Qalamoun include:

- Saint Marina The Monk
- Rashid Rida, (1865–1935), early Islamic reformer
- Mustafa Agha Barbar – A 19th Century Ottoman governor of the Ottoman provinces of Tripoli and Latakia.
