= Tafsir al-Manar =

Quranic exegesis by Rashid Rida

- Author: Rashid Rida
- Original title: تفسير المنار
- Language: Arabic
- Subject: Quranic commentary
- Genre: Islamic literature
- Publication date: Early 20th century
- Publication place: Egypt
- Media type: Print (Hardcover)
- Pages: 12 volumes

Tafsir al-Manar (Arabic: تفسير المنار, lit. 'Interpretation of Beacon') is a work of Qur'anic exegesis (tafsir) by Rashid Rida, an Islamic scholar and the major figure within the early Salafiyya movement. The tafsir work can be fitted into the category of modern tafsir, which is distinguishable from the classical tafsir in the sense that it approaches to more contemporary issues through the broader scope of methodology it employs for the interpretation. The tafsir is also notable in the context of Islamic movement, as it served as an avenue for Rida to profess and promulgate his ideology.

== Content ==
Tafsir al-Manar was initially a collection of fragments of thought articulated by the founding figure of the Islamic Modernism, Muhammad Abduh whom Rida was a disciple of. Rida edited the tafsir into more concise and straightforward language.

The tafsir is in 12 volumes and applies the teachings of the Quran and the Islamic prophet Muhammad to contemporary issues. Its methodology can be considered as a combination of both tafsir al-riwaya, a tafsir that employs the traditional sources, and tafsir al-diraya, a tafsir that employs augmented sources.

Rida said of Sharia:

Koran 5:44 applies to "...whomsoever thinks it distasteful to rule in accordance with the just rules which God sent down, and does not rule by them because he has different views, or because he has worldly interests. According to these verses, they are unbelievers; because true faith requires obedience. Obedience requires deeds, and is not consistent with omission."
