= Al-Manār (magazine) =

Egyptian Islamic magazine, published 1898–1940

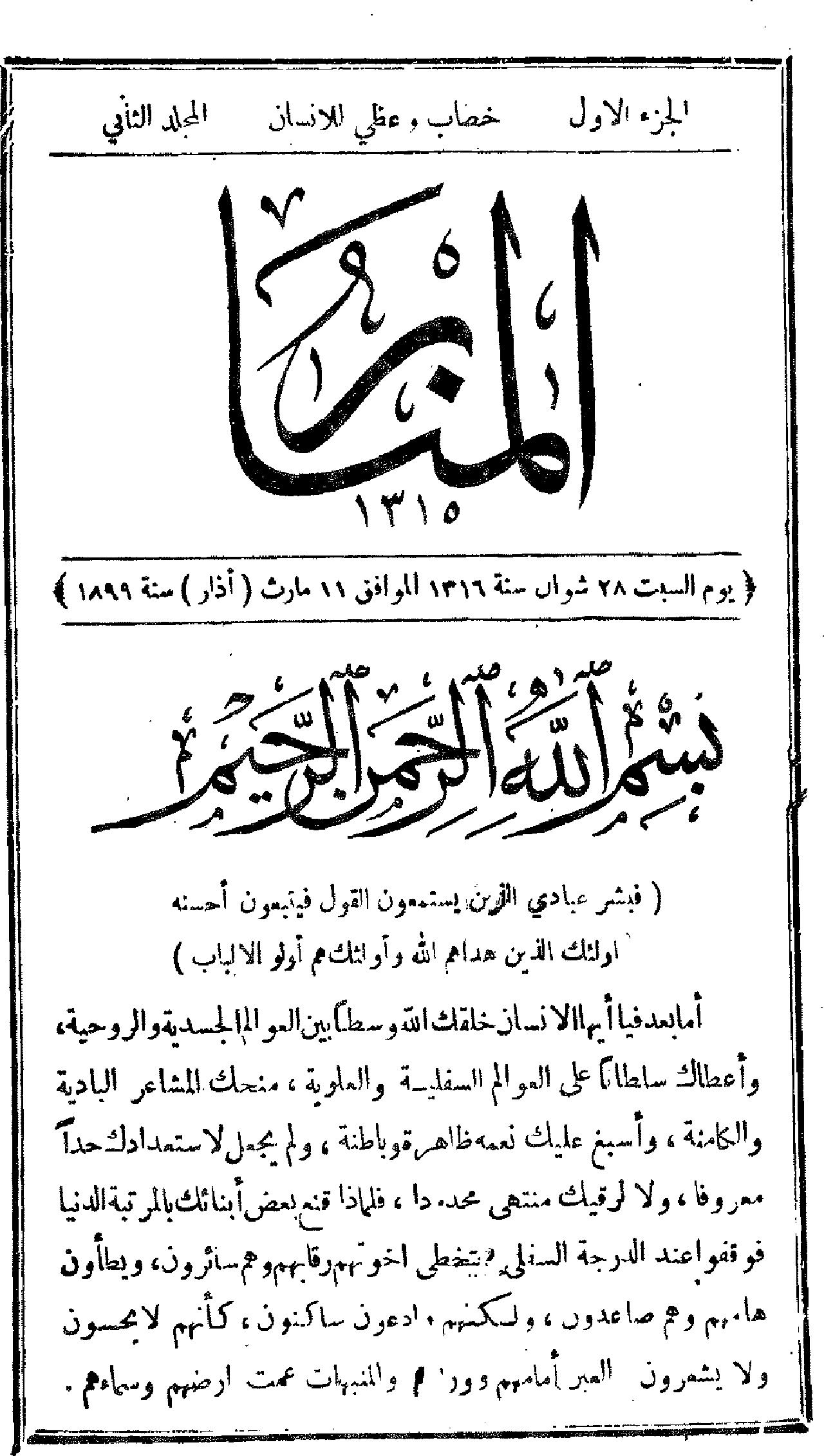
- Cover of the second issue of Al Manār magazine, 1899
- Editor-in-chief: Rashid Rida
- Categories: Islamic magazine; Political magazine
- Frequency: Weekly; Monthly
- Founder: Rashid Rida; Salih Rida
- Founded: 1898
- Final issue: 1940
- Country: Egypt
- Based in: Cairo
- Language: Arabic

Al-Manār (Arabic: المنار; 'The Lighthouse') was an Islamic magazine, written in Arabic, and was founded, published and edited by Rashid Rida from 1898 until his death in 1935 in Cairo, Egypt. The magazine championed the superiority of Islamic religious system over other ideologies and was noteworthy for its campaigns for the restoration of a pan-Islamic Caliphate.

== History and profile ==
Al-Manār was founded by the Sunni scholar Muhammad Rashid Rida in 1898, and his brother, Salih Rida, was also instrumental in the establishment of the magazine. They were both members of the Decentralization Party. Their goal in establishing the magazine was to articulate and disseminate reformist ideas and preserve the unity of the Muslim nations. The magazine was based in Cairo. It was started as a weekly, but later its frequency was switched to monthly.

Rashid Rida was the sole editor-in-chief of the magazine. Its content was heavily about Quranic interpretations. Rida published numerous articles in Al-Manār which praised the Wahhabi movement in Arabia. One of the contributors was Abd al-Rahman al-Kawakibi, a scholar from Aleppo, Syria. His book, Umm al-Qura, was serialized in Al-Manār from April 1902 to February 1903 which proposed the establishment of an Arab Caliphate. The magazine also featured articles on politics and covered the coronation of King Hussein as the ruler of Hejaz in October 1916.

In addition to championing the beliefs of the Arabian Muwahhidun movement, Al-Manar also popularised the treatises of major Salafi theologians of Yemen. These included Nayl al-Autar and Irshad al-Fuhul by Al-Shawkani and Subul al-Salam by Ibn al-Amir Al-San’ani. Outlining the religious orientation of his magazine, Rashid Rida wrote:

since its inception, al-Manar has been preaching the pure oneness [of God] and the views of the early pious generation (madhhab al-salaf) in matters [related to] the dogmas and guidance of Islam. As for matters relating to governance and power, it [i.e., al-Manar, has been advocating] the arts of the age and the laws of nature (funun al-asr wa sunan al-khalq)

Al-Manār was one of the earliest Arab publications which called attention to the Zionist threat against Palestine. The magazine declared in 1898 that the Zionists were attempting to occupy Palestine. It called attention to the same concern in 1902.

Following the death of Rashid Rida in 1935, Al-Manār was irregularly published until 1940. In October 1939 it was temporarily banned by the Egyptian government. Two issues were published by the heirs of Rida, and from 1939 to 1940 the Association of Muslim Brotherhood was the publisher of Al-Manār.

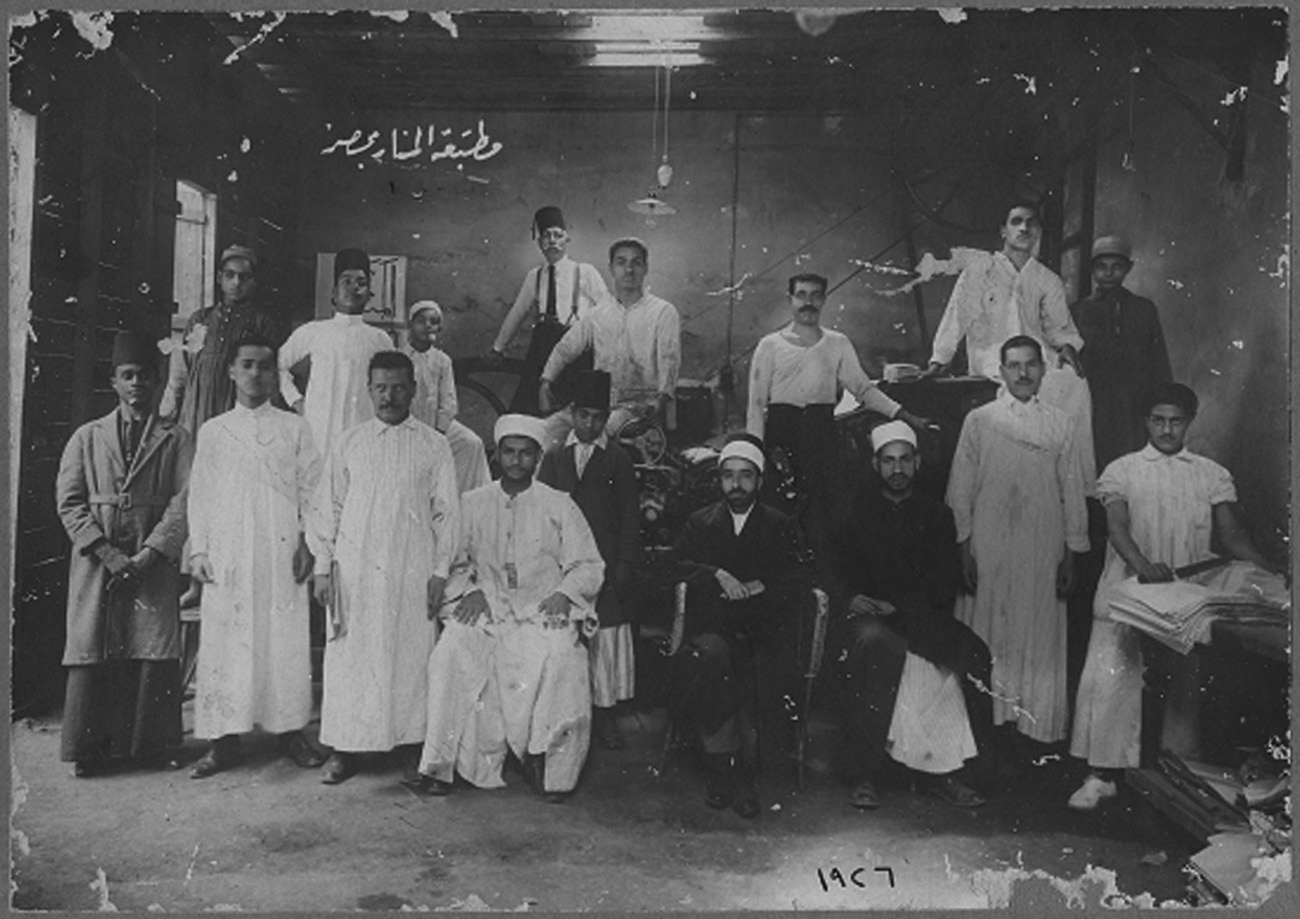
Employees of the Al-Manar Printing Press, Cairo

== Legacy ==
Al-Manar advocated for a fundamentalist revival of the methodology and doctrine of the Salaf al-Salih based on the writings of classical Hanbali theologian Ahmad ibn Taymiyyah (728 AH/1263 CE); communicating these ideas in such a way that mobilised the Muslim masses both culturally and politically. The intellectual heritage of Al-Manār has been adopted and championed by Islamic religious movements and organizations in Arab world, including the Muslim Brotherhood in Egypt and the Association of Algerian ‘Ulama’ in Algeria. Founder of the Muslim Brotherhood, Hasan Al Banna, praised Al-Manar as one of "the greatest influences in the service of Islam for this age in Egypt and in other areas."

Al-Manār inspired various journals, including Shura, a Turkic language magazine published in Orenburg between 1908 and 1918.

== See also ==
- List of theological journals
- The Caliphate or the Supreme Imamate (book)
