= Islah =

Arabic term for reform

Islah or Al-Islah (الإصلاح ,إصلاح, al-ʾIṣlāḥ) is an Arabic word, usually translated literally as "reform" (but contextually referring to "restore"), in the sense of "to improve, to better, to put something into a better position, correction, correcting something and removing vice, reworking, emendation, reparation, restoration, rectitude, probability, reconciliation." It is an important term in Islam. The Islamic concept of "Islah" advocates for moral advancement through a restoration based on the rudimental standards of the Qur'an and the Sunnah. Islah is characterised by an attitude of bypassing classical legal works in preference to literature from the early Muslim generations (Salaf al-Salih). Islahi ulema oppose taqlid, strongly argue for the necessity of ijtihad and are often referred to as salafis.

The word is opposite to the word Ifsad, another important Islamic term meaning "corruption". It is also used in politics (including as a name for political parties), and is also used as a personal and place name.

== Etymology ==
According to author Josef W. Meri and other scholars, the word is derived from the root salaha Ṣ-L-Ḥ (ص ل ح), occurs in forty verses of the Qur'an, including 49:10, 4:114, 4:128, 11:88 where it means "to do good, proper, right, restore oneself or to reconcile people with one another, to make peace."

The believers are but brothers, so make settlement/reconciliation (islah) between your brothers. And fear Allah that you may receive mercy.

— Al-Hujurat 49:10

No good is there in much of their private conversation, except for those who enjoin charity or that which is right or conciliation between people. And whoever does that seeking means to the approval of Allah - then We are going to give him a great reward.

— Quran, An-Nisa 4:114

And if a woman fears from her husband contempt or evasion, there is no sin upon them if they make terms of settlement or reconciliation between them - and settlement is best. And present in [human] souls is stinginess. But if you do good and fear Allah - then indeed Allah is ever, with what you do, Acquainted.

— Quran, An-Nisa 4:128

In sura Al-Hud, it is mentioned as Islamic prophet Shuaib told to his community,

He said, "O my people, have you considered: if I am upon clear evidence from my Lord and He has provided me with a good provision from Him... ? And I do not intend to differ from you in that which I have forbidden you; I only intend reform as much as I am able. And my success is not but through Allah . Upon him I have relied, and to Him I return.

— Quran, 11:8.

== Relation with tajdid ==
Tajdid, meaning renewal, is another Islamic term used with the term islah in the field of different Islamic political interpretation. The person who practices tajdid is called mujaddid (renewer), but scholars such as Al-Dhahabi and Ibn Hajar al-Asqalani have interpreted that the term mujaddid can also be understood as plural, thus referring to a group of people. The concept is based on a hadith (a saying of Islamic prophet Muhammad), recorded by Abu Dawood, narrated by Abu Hurairah who mentioned that Islamic prophet Muhammad said:

Allah will raise for this community at the end of every 100 years the one who will renovate its religion for it.

— Sunan Abu Dawood, Book 37: Kitab al-Malahim [Battles], Hadith Number 4278

According to majority of Muslim scholars, Caliph Umar II (682-720 C.E) is considered as the first mujaddid in early Islam. After them, Muhammad ibn Idris al-Shafi'i (767–820), Abu Hamid al-Ghazali (1058–1111), Taqi al-Din ibn Taymiyya (1263–1328), Abu Ishaq al-Shatibi (d. 1388), Shah Waliullah Dehlawi (1703–1762), Muhammad ibn 'Abd al-Wahhab (1703–1792), 'Uthman Dan Fodio (1754–1817), Muhammad al-Shawkani (1760–1834), and Muhammad ibn Ali al-Sanusi (1787–1859), etc. have been denominated as prominent reformers in Islam. In particular, Ibn Taymiyya is regarded as a towering figure in the history of Islamic reformism and his campaigns against mystical interpretation, critique of Taqlid (blind following), creedal polemics against Falsafa, etc. have influenced a wide range of Salafi-oriented reform movements. Starting from the 18th century, numerous Islamic reformers such as Shawkani, Ibn 'Abd al-Wahhab, Mahmud al-Alusi, al-Sanussi, etc. have popularised Ibn Taymiyya's teachings in their quest for tajdid and religious purity.

According to author Juan Eduardo Campo and other scholars, "islah" is used most commonly today in Arabic with respect to the idea of reform, although this usage was not widespread until the modern reform movements of the 19th and 20th centuries; scholars like Muhammad Abduh (1849-1905), Rashid Rida (1865-1935), a prominent follower of Ibn Taimiyah); and Mahmud Shaltut (1893-1963) became popular for their contemporary islah movements.

== Scholars' views ==
Islamic scholar Sayyid Rashid Rida (1865–1935 C.E/ 1282–1354 A.H) considered renewal (Tajdid) and reform (Islah) as a continuous process throughout the history of Islam. As time passes, masses fall into superstitions and innovations due to various reasons. During every era, religious reformers appear to eradicate these heresies and campaign for a return to the pure Islam, by inviting to Qur'an and Sunnah. Rida classified reformers/renewers into two types: i) Major reformers recognised universally by all Muslims ii) Regional reformers. Some of the major reformers of Islamic history in Rida's list included:

- Umar ibn 'Abd al-Aziz (d. 720 C.E/ 101 A.H)
- Ahmad ibn Hanbal (d. 855 C.E/ 241 A.H)
- Abul Hasan al-Ash'ari (d. 936 C.E/ 324 A.H)
- Ibn Hazm al-Andalusi (d. 1064 C.E/ 456 A.H)
- Taqi al-Din Ahmad ibn Taymiyyah (d. 1328 C.E/ 728 A.H)
- Ibn Qayyim al-Jawziyya (d. 1350 C.E/ 751 A.H)

The second type of reformers, whose scholarly impact were limited to particular lands consisted of figures such as:

- Abu Ishaq Al-Shatibi (8th century Andalus)
- Shah Waliullah Dehlwi (12th century South Asia)
- Muhammad ibn 'Abd al-Wahhab (12th century Arabia)
- Muhammad ibn Ali al-Shawkani (13th century Yemen)
- Muhammad Siddiq Hasan Khan (13th century South Asia)

Salafi scholar Salih Al-Munajjid argued in his book "Prophets Methods of correcting People's Mistakes" that, Islah or correct mistakes is a basic aspect in Quran and Hadith and there are 38 prophetic ways to do Islah or correct people. and they are:

1. Prompt action in correcting mistakes and not relaxing
2. Remedy of errors by description of provisions
3. Bringing the wrongdoers back to the Shariah and reminding them of the principles they have violated
4. Correction of concepts where errors are detected due to errors in concepts
5. Correction of mistakes by advice and re-intimidation
6. Showing mercy to the wrong-doer
7. Don't be too quick to catch mistakes
8. Calm behavior with wrongdoers
9. Describe the severity of the mistake
10. Describing the costs or damages of mistakes
11. Teaching the wrongdoer manually or practically
12. Bring up the correct option
13. Telling ways to avoid making mistakes
14. Saying without directly naming the wrongdoer
15. To stir up the public against the wrongdoer
16. Refraining from cooperating with Satan against the wrongdoer
17. Asking to stop wrongdoing
18. Instructing the wrongdoer to correct his mistake (a) Returning the wrongdoer's attention to his mistake, so that he can correct his mistake (b) Asking him to redo the work in the correct manner if possible (c) Making the irregular flow of work as regular as possible Saying (d) Correcting the effects of mistakes (e) Atonement for mistakes
19. Just discard the error field and accept the rest
20. To repay the creditor and preserve the dignity of the wrongdoer
21. In case of bilateral mistakes, listening to both sides and giving instructions about the mistakes of both
22. Asking the wrongdoer to seek forgiveness from the one against whom he has wronged
23. To remind the wrongdoer of the dignity of the one against whom he has wronged, so that he may feel ashamed and repent.
24. Intervening in de-escalation of tensions and rooting out sedition from wrongdoers
25. Expressing anger for mistakes
26. To turn away from the wrongdoer and avoid controversy in the hope that he will return to the right path
27. Rebuke the wrongdoer
28. To speak harshly to the wrongdoer
29. Turning away from the wrongdoer
30. Boycott the wrongdoer
31. Baddu'a (curse) against the wrongdoer
32. Catching some mistakes and ignoring some mistakes out of compassion for the wrongdoer, so that the entire mistake is realized in a gesture.
33. Helping the Muslim to correct his mistakes
34. Meeting with the wrongdoer and discussing with him
35. Telling about the wrongdoer's condition and mistake on his face
36. Interrogate the wrongdoer
37. Convince the wrongdoer that his lame excuse is not acceptable
38. Paying attention to human mood and instinct

Saudi cleric Khalid Bin Abdullah al-Musleh listed seven obstacles in the way of Tazkiah in his book "Islahul Qulub" (reforming the hearts):

1. Shirk
2. Rejecting Sunnah and following Bid'ah
3. Obeying the instinct and ego (nafs)
4. Doubt
5. Negligence (ghaflah)

He also listed 8 ways to maintain Tazkiah:

1. Reading Quran
2. Loving Allah
3. Doing dhikr
4. Tawbah and Istighfar
5. Supplicate (dua) for hidayah and purify
6. Remembering afterlife (Akhirah)
7. Reading the biographies of the salafs
8. Company of good, honest and pious people.

== Politics ==
Several political groups and parties have been named "Islah" in the 20th and 21st centuries, including:

- Al-Islah (Yemen), or the Yemeni Congregation for Reform, a political party in Yemen
- Al Islah (United Arab Emirates), an Islamist group based in the United Arab Emirates that is affiliated with the Muslim Brotherhood
- Islah Party, or Hizb Al-Islah, also known as Egyptian Reform Party, a Salafi political party in Egypt
- El-Islah, also known as Movement for National Reform, a moderate Islamist political party in Algeria
- El Islah, political party in Mauritania
- Hizb el Islah al Suri, a Syrian lobby group based in the United States that was active in the mid to late 2000s
- Hizb Al-Islah wa Al-Tanmiyah, an Egyptian liberal political party
- Tayar Al-Islah Al-Watani, an Iraqi political party

== In popular culture ==
Rapper Kevin Gates named his debut studio album Islah inspired by his daughter's same name.

== See also ==
- Islamic modernism
- Islamic views on piety
- Islamic views on sin
- Istighfar
- Tazkiah
- Tawbah
