= Asabiyyah =

Concept of social solidarity

Asabiyyah or asabiyya (Arabic: عصبيّة, romanized: ʿaṣabiyya, lit. 'group cohesiveness') is a concept of social solidarity with an emphasis on unity, group consciousness, and a sense of shared purpose and social cohesion. Originally rooted in tribal and clan loyalties, asabiyyah came to signify social solidarity in a broader sense after Ibn Khaldun made it the central concept in his explanation of the cyclical rise and fall of dynastic states. Arabist Franz Rosenthal, in his English translation of Ibn Khaldun's Muqaddimah, translated asabiyyah as group feeling. However, it can carry negative connotations due to its use in contexts of ethnic and linguistic nationalism or partisanship, i.e., loyalty to one's group regardless of circumstances.

The concept was familiar in the pre-Islamic era, but became popularized in Ibn Khaldun's Muqaddimah, in which it is described as the fundamental bond of human society and the basic motive force of history, pure only in its nomadic form. Ibn Khaldun argued that 'asabiyya is cyclical and directly relevant to the rise and fall of civilizations: it is strongest at the start of a civilization, declines as the civilization advances, and then another more compelling asabiyyah eventually takes its place to help establish a different civilization.

== Etymology ==
The Arabic noun ʿaṣabiyya (عصبيّة) derives from the triliteral root ʿ-ṣ-b (ع-ص-ب), whose core semantic field concerns binding, wrapping, or tying together.

== Overview ==
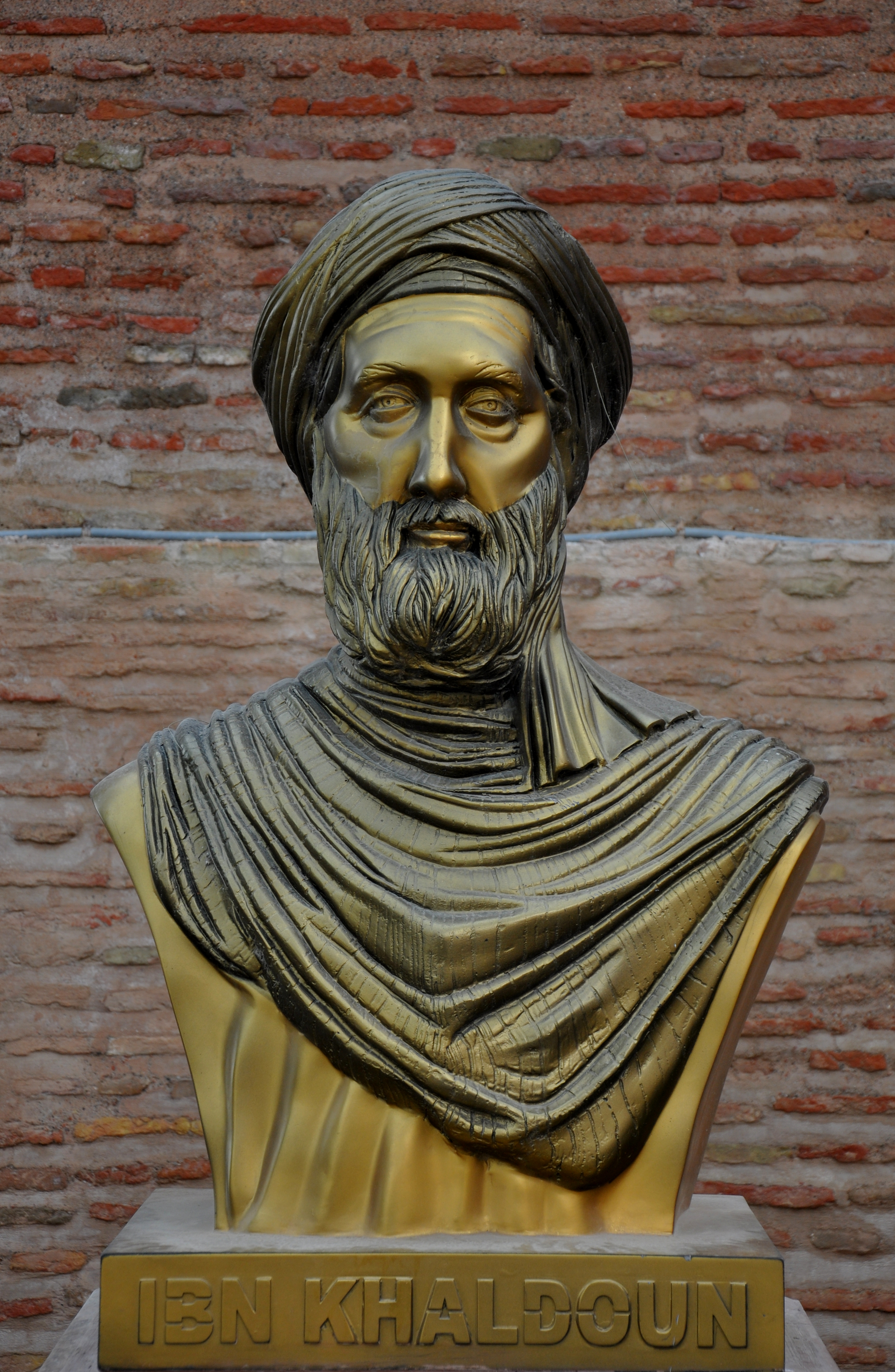
Bust of Ibn Khaldun (1332–1406) in the entrance of the Kasbah of Bejaia, Algeria

Ibn Khaldun describes asabiyya as the bond of cohesion among humans in a group-forming community. The bond exists at any level of civilization, from nomadic society to states and empires. Asabiyyah is strongest in the nomadic phase, and decreases as civilization advances. As this declines, another more compelling asabiyyah may take its place; thus, civilizations rise and fall, and history describes these cycles as they play out.

Ibn Khaldun argued that any dynasty (or civilization) has within itself the seeds of its own downfall. He explains that ruling houses tend to emerge on the peripheries of existing empires and use the much stronger asabiyya present in their areas to their advantage, in order to bring about a change in leadership. This implies that the new rulers are at first considered 'barbarians' in comparison to the previous ones. As they establish themselves at the center of their empire, they become increasingly lax, less coordinated, disciplined and watchful, and more concerned with maintaining their new power and lifestyle. Their asabiyya dissolves into factionalism and individualism, diminishing their capacity as a political unit. Conditions are thus created wherein a new dynasty can emerge at the periphery of their control, grow strong, and effect a change in leadership, continuing the cycle. Ibn Khaldun also further states in the Muqaddimah that "dynasties have a natural life span like individuals", and that no dynasty generally lasts beyond three generations of about 40 years each.

== See also ==
- Tribalism
- Ethnocentrism
- Social cycle theory
- Historic recurrence
- Guilt–shame–fear spectrum of cultures
- Superpower collapse
