= Shura =

Arabic word for "consultation"

Shura (Arabic: شُورَىٰ, romanized: shūrā, lit. 'consultation') is the term for collective decision-making in Islam. It can, for example, take the form of a council or a referendum. The Quran encourages Muslims to decide their affairs in consultation with each other.

Shura is mentioned as a praiseworthy activity often used in organizing the affairs of a mosque, Islamic organizations, and is a common term involved in naming parliaments.

== Shura in Islam ==
Sunni Muslims believe that Islam requires decisions made by the Muslim societies to be made by shura of the Muslim community. Traditionally however, the amir, sultan or caliph would consult with his wazirs (ministers) and make a decision, after taking into consideration their opinions.

Shia Muslims say that Islam requires submission to existing rulers if they are correctly appointed, so long as they govern according to Sharia or Islamic law. This is a more traditional approach, characteristic of many centuries of Islamic history.

The difference between the two appears more semantic than actual—the latter accept that the rulers must be accounted in all aspects of ruling, to ensure affairs are managed in the best possible way whether decisions were taken through consultation or not.

=== Shura in the Qur'an ===
- The 42nd Sura of the Qur'an is named “Shura”. The 38th verse of that Sura declares shura to be the praiseworthy lifestyle of a successful believer. It states that Muslims should decide on their matters by consulting with each other.

"Those who hearken to their Lord, and establish regular Prayer; who (conduct) their affairs by mutual consultation among themselves; who spend out of what We bestow on them for Sustenance" [are praised] (Q.42:38)

- The 159th verse of 3rd Sura advises Muhammad to consult with believers regarding a matter.

Thus it is due to mercy from God that you deal with them gently, and had you been rough, hard hearted, they would certainly have dispersed from around you; pardon them therefore and ask pardon for them, and take counsel with them in the affair; so when you have decided, then place your trust in God; surely God loves those who trust. (Q.3:159)

- Shura is also mentioned in ayah 233 of the 2nd Sura of Qur'an, but in a very specific context of how a mother and father who have a young child but are divorced should consult each other concerning the weaning of their child.

...But if both sides decide—after mutual consultation and consent—to wean a child, then there is no blame on them.... (Q.2:233)

Muhammad made some of his decisions in consultation with his followers unless it was a matter in which he said Allah had ordained something. It was common among Muhammad's companions to ask him if a certain advice was from God or from him. If it was from Muhammad, they felt free to give their opinion. Some times Muhammad changed his opinion on the advice of his followers like his decision to defend the city of Madinah by going out of the city in Uhad instead of from within the city.

Arguments over shura began with the debate over the ruler in the Islamic world. When Muhammad died in 632 CE, a tumultuous meeting at Saqifah selected Abu Bakr as his successor. This meeting did not include some of those with a strong interest in the matter—especially Ali ibn Abi Talib, Muhammad's cousin and son-in-law; people who wanted Ali to be the caliph (ruler) (later known as Shia) still consider Abu Bakr an illegitimate leader of the caliphate.

In later years, the followers of Ali as the ruler of Muslims became one school of thought (Shi'atu Ali or Shia), while the followers of Abu Bakr became the Sunni school of thought.

The Sunni school of thought believe that shura is recommended in the Qur'an (though some classical jurists maintained it is obligatory), The Qur'an, and by numerous hadith, or oral traditions of the sayings and doings of Muhammad and his companions. They say that the first four caliphs, or rulers of Islam, whom they call the Four Rightly-guided Caliphs, were chosen by shura. (See Succession to Muhammad, Umar ibn al-Khattab, The election of Uthman, and Ali Ibn Abi Talib.)

The Shi'a school of thought believe that Muhammad had clearly indicated that Ali was his appointed infallible ruler of Muslim nation regardless of shura, a recommendation that was ignored by the first three caliphs. Shi'a do not stress the role of shura in choosing leaders, but believe that the divine vice-regent is chosen by God, or Allah, from the lineage of Muhammad (Ahl al-Bayt). The largest Shi'a sect believes that the current imam is in "occultation", hidden away until the last days, but there are minority Shi'a who follow leaders believed to be infallible imams.

=== Shura and the caliphate ===
During and after Ali's tenure as caliph, the Muslim community fell into civil war. Power was eventually grasped by the Umayyad caliphs and then by the Abbasid caliphs. There were also rival caliphates in Egypt and Al-Andalus (today's Spain and Portugal), and in the Indian subcontinent. The Ottoman Caliphate was officially dissolved by the newly founded Grand National Assembly of Turkey in 1924.

Few of the later caliphs had anything but nominal control over the many Islamic states, and none were chosen by shura; all reached power by inheritance.

=== Dispute over importance ===
The Muslim clergy counseled submission to rulers but also stressed the duty of the ruler to rule by shura. They based this recommendation on the passages from the Qur'an mentioned above.

Author Jebran Chamieh notes that while some Muslims consider Shurah a "pillar" of Islam, a number of factors indicate it may not be.

- The two Quranic verses mention shura only briefly, and
- while the verses indicate that shura is praiseworthy they do not indicate who should be consulted, what they should be consulted about, or whether the ruler or the shura should prevail in the event the two do not agree.
- While the Quran mentions briefly that consultation is worthwhile, in the corpus of Hadith there are few or no elaborations of who should be consulted, when, and about what; hadith being the usual place to expand on brief mentions in the Quran if those have any importance.
- Some Muslims argue Muhammad sought the advice of the Companions occasionally, but he "never felt the advice was binding on him", nor did he follow the "pre-Islamic practice of holding regular meetings in the assemblies of Mecca and Medina".
- Contrary to the insistence of some Muslim authors, Muhammad's successors, the Rashidun Caliphs, did not seek consultation on decisions they had to make in governing nor in the choosing of the next Caliph.

== Shura and contemporary Muslim-majority states ==
In some Muslim nations, shuras play a role in the constitution or governance. Some Muslim nations, such as Turkey, are secular republics, and Morocco is a constitutional monarchy. They could thus be said to be ruled by one version of shura. For instance, the bicameral Parliament of Pakistan is officially called the Majlis-i-Shura, although the Constitution uses various spellings of the term. In Egypt, the Upper House of Parliament was known as the Shura Council. The People's Consultative Assembly in Indonesia is called Majlis Permusyawaratan Rakyat in Indonesian language. The word musyawarat is derived from shura/syawara.

In some monarchies and clerical regimes, there is a shura with an advisory or consultative role. Saudi Arabia, a monarchy, was given a shura council, the Consultative Assembly of Saudi Arabia, in 1993; there are now 150 members. All real power is held by the King, who is elected by family members. Oman, also a monarchy, has a shura council; all members are elected except the president, who is appointed by the sultan. The council can only offer advice, which may be refused by the sultan.

In Iran, a council called the assembly of experts has the ability to impeach the Supreme Leader. In addition to that, a general shura wields legislative powers, equivalent to a modern-day Western parliament.

Shuras have also been a feature of revolutions in Islamic societies, such as in the Iranian revolution of 1979, where they were formed by workers and held considerable power over parts of the economy for a year before being dismantled. Shuras were similarly a feature of the uprisings in Iraq in 1991, where they functioned as a form of participatory democracy.

In the 21st century, some emerging scholars are now advocating the infusion of Shura with digital technology as a means to enhance participatory governance or E-Governance among Muslims for state- and community-building purposes.

=== Resemblance between majlis al-shura and a parliament ===
Many traditional Sunni Islamic lawyers agree that to be in keeping with Islam, a government should have some form of council of consultation or majlis al-shura, although it must recognize that God and not the people are sovereign. Al-Mawardi has written that members of the majlis should satisfy three conditions: they must be just, have enough knowledge to distinguish a good caliph from a bad one, and have sufficient wisdom and judgment to select the best caliph. Al-Mawardi also said that in emergencies when there is no caliphate and no majlis, the people themselves should create a majlis, select a list of candidates for caliph, and then the majlis should select a caliph from the list of candidates.

Many contemporary Muslims have compared the concept of Shura to the principles of western parliamentary democracy. For example:

What is the shura principle in Islam? ... It is predicated on three basic precepts. First, that all persons in any given society are equal in human and civil rights. Second, that public issues are best decided by majority view. And third, that the three other principles of justice, equality and human dignity, which constitute Islam's moral core, ... are best realized, in personal as well as public life, under shura governance.

Other modern Muslim thinkers distance themselves from democracy. Taqiuddin al-Nabhani, the founder of the modern transnational Islamist party Hizb ut-Tahrir, writes that shura is important and part of "the ruling structure" of the Islamic caliphate, "but not one of its pillars." If the caliph "neglects it," by not paying much or any attention, as happened after the first four caliphs, "he would be negligent, but the ruling system would remain Islamic."

This is because the shura (consultation) in Islam is for seeking the opinion and not for ruling. This is contrary to the parliamentary system in democracy.

The democratic parliamentary system being distinct from and inferior to the true Islamic caliphate system according to Taqiuddin an-Nabhani.

Under the Hizb ut-Tahrir constitution, non-Muslims may not serve a caliph or any other ruling official, nor vote for these officials, but may be part of the majlis and voice "complaints in respect to unjust acts performed by the rulers or the misapplication of Islam upon them."

Still others, such as the Muslim author Sayyid Qutb, go further, arguing that an Islamic shura should advise the caliph but not elect or supervise him. In an analysis of the shura chapter of the Qur'an, Qutb noted that Islam requires only that the ruler consult with at least some of the ruled (usually the elite), within the general context of God-made laws that the ruler must execute. In 1950 Qutb denounced democracy in favor of dictatorship, saying it was already bankrupt in the West and asking why it should be imported to the Middle East.

The practice of a consultative, but not bill-passing, caliph-electing or popularly elected shura, was adopted by the self-described strict Islamic Emirate of Afghanistan. While the Kandahar Shura of the Taliban debated issues, in the end its spokesman declared, "we abide by the Amir's view even if he alone takes this view."

== See also ==
- Islamic democracy
- Moderation in Islam
- Salat al-Istikharah
