= Ahl al-hall wal-aqd =

Ahl al-hall wal-aqd (Arabic: أهل الحل والعقد, romanized: ahl al-ḥall wa’l-‘aqd, meaning: the people of loosing and binding) is a term used in political aspects of Islam that refers to those qualified to appoint or depose an Ulu'l-amr or ruler on behalf of the Ummah.

== Conditions ==
They are the ones who have the ability to establish the system of the Muslim community in their public affairs, and to dissolve this system for reasons in order to re-arrange and establish it again. The Sharia did not set a specific method for choosing them, nor did it stipulate a specific group to play their role. The purpose is to find the people of solution and contract in any way that is consistent with the principle of Shura to ensure their good selection, and the Sharia stipulated conditions that are binding on the person in charge of each of the general states, and they are determined according to the nature of the role and what it requires of the person in charge of it, so that the interests of the nation are taken care of in the required manner, and the necessity of making the utmost effort in choosing the most suitable of those present, according to those conditions for whoever undertakes to carry out the required duty.

Three conditions must be met by them, as Al-Mawardi said in his book Ordinances of the Government:

- All conditions of the court should exist.
- To be knowledgeable about all matters related to Islamic Caliphate and Emirate.
- Be able to make judgments and be wise.
- Ahl al-Hill wal-Aqd are those whose decision is accepted by the whole Ummah with pleasure and their decision is considered the decision of all.

== See also ==
- Political aspects of Islam
- Verse of Obedience
- Majlis-ash-Shura
- Early Caliphate and political ideals
- Islamic democracy
