= Amin al-Khuli =

Egyptian academic, Quran scholar and writer (1895 - 1966)

- أمين الخولي
- Born: May 1, 1895; Shushay, Monufia Governorate, Khedivate of Egypt
- Died: 1966 (aged 70–71); Cairo, Egypt
- Known for: Pioneering the literary-critical approach to Quranic exegesis (Tafsir); Founding the Umana literary circle; Mentoring key modernists including Bint al-Shati and Mohamed Ahmad Khalafallah
- Title: Shaykh al-Umana
- Spouse: Aisha Abd al-Rahman (Bint al-Shati)

Academic background
- Education: Madrasat al-Qada al-Shar'i; Al-Azhar University

Academic work
- Discipline: Islamic studies, Arabic literature, Tafsir, Rhetoric

Amin al-Khuli (1895 - 1966) was an Egyptian academic, Quran scholar and writer.

He is considered a pioneer in the literary approach to the exegesis of the Qur'an, which suggests that, despite its sacred character, the Quranic text can be examined using the same type of analysis as any literary work.

== Biography ==
Amin al-Khuli was born on May 1, 1895, in Shushay and then lived in Cairo. Early in his childhood, he memorized the entire Quran. He studied at the madrasa al Qada al-Sha'i, where he became familiar with the teachings of Mohamed 'Abduh. In 1919, he became involved in the fight against British colonialism. He obtained a teaching position in 1920 and then traveled to Europe: to Rome and Berlin. Upon returning to Egypt, he taught at Al-Azhar University. He later succeeded Ṭaha Ḥusayn as chair of Arabic literature in the faculty of letters at Fouad University, which has since become Cairo University. He is co-founder of the literary review Al-Adab.

== Literary analysis of the Quran ==
He is considered one of the main reformers of this genre of balaghah (Islamic rhetoric).

He advocates an approach to the Quran that considers the text as a whole, avoids breaking it up into a verse-by-verse study that loses sight of the coherence of the whole, and advises on the contrary to bring together verses that deal with similar themes.

His approach to the sacred text of Islam as a literary work is part of a continuing questioning of the inimitable nature (ijaz) of the Qur'an, drawn from the text itself: "Surely if mankind and jinn banded together to bring the like of this Quran, they would not bring the like thereof, even if they supported one another (Q: 17:88)." Some consider that the Qur'an, being the very Word of God, cannot be subjected to the same analysis as a text of human origin. But, far from discrediting the text, Al-Khuli considers the Qur'an to be "the greatest Arabic text". He takes seriously the assertion of the incomparable character of the Qur'an and launches into the study of the rhetorical means used to disseminate the prophetic message.

Following al-Jurjani, Khuli emphasizes the need for a literary approach to understand what makes the Qur'an a unique work of its kind. But according to him, it is necessary to add to the study of rhetoric the methods of literary criticism and the psychological analysis of the effects of the text on the reader. It is also necessary to take into account the context, which is why the exegete must know the history of the establishment of the text and that of the Arabic language.

On the other hand, he rejects the so-called scientific exegesis, which consists of wanting to prove the value of the Koran by discovering in it the beginnings of modern scientific discoveries. At a conference in Cairo in 1957, the subject of which was to know if the Koran contains the announcement of the launch of the Sputnik satellite, he affirmed that the holy book of Islam is above all intended to guide believers in the spiritual domain.

=== Khalafallah's thesis ===
His disciple was Muhammad Ahmad Khalafallah, who published in 1947, under his supervision, a thesis on "The art of narration in the holy Qur'an" (al-fann al-qasasî fî al-qur'ân al-karîm). The controversy caused by this work among the most conservative cost Al-Khuli his career.

Muhammad Khalafallah was influenced by al-Khuli. He was also inspired by the views of Muhammad 'Abduh on the value of Quranic stories: the stories in the Quran are not valuable as historical narratives, but for their ethical and spiritual significance. This is why the facts are reported without concern for the precision of dates and places: that is not the main concern, what counts is the effect produced on the listener or reader. Nasr Hamid Abu Zayd explains Khalafallah's idea in these terms: "The Quranic stories are literary works serving ethical, spiritual and religious objectives. It is therefore a fatal methodological error to claim to read the stories of the Quran as purely historical facts." Khalafallah places the stories in the context of their revelation, in order to discern what, in the Quran, has universal value, or relative to the context of the time. For example, the references to witchcraft, or to angels, are according to him concessions made to the superstitions of the Bedouins, intended to make the prophetic message more convincing to them. Khalafallah also takes into account in the understanding of the text the psychology of the Prophet and his evolution, in particular according to the reception of his message by his listeners.

But he does not question the authenticity of revelation. Rather, he takes up the traditional theme of the inimitability of the Qur'an, as evidenced by the title of the first version of his thesis - Min asrar al-iʿjaz ("The Secrets of the Inimitability of the Qur'an").

Critics of the thesis argued that its author treated the Qur'an as if it were a human work, and not the divine word. A letter was published, demanding that Khalafallah and his thesis supervisor al-Khuli be brought to justice for crimes against the Qur'an. The thesis was rejected. Khalafallah was transferred, and al-Khuli was no longer allowed to teach Qur'anic studies. The chair he occupied remained vacant until 1972, when Nasr Hamid Abu Zayd took over. Khalafallah would eventually obtain a doctorate, but with a thesis on Abu al-Faraj al-Isfahani, a less sensitive subject. However, he chose to entrust its supervision to the man who supported him during the controversy, Amin al-Khuli.

Al-khuli inspired another disciple, 'Aisha Abd al-Rahman, who became his wife. She implemented al-Khuli's ideas to write a commentary on the Qur'an, the Tafsīr al-Bayānī, in which she applied the methods of literary criticism to exegesis.

== Islam and Protestantism ==
During a conference on "Islam and the Protestant Reformation" at the Congress of the History of Religions in 1935, he put forward a thesis on the influence of Islam in the birth of the Protestant movement. The Reformation of Christianity and its relationship with Islam expresses his vision of the unity of religions.

== Works ==
- Al-Aʻmāl al-kāmilah (“Complete Works”);
- Al-Balāghah al-ʻArabīyah wa-athar al-falsafah fīhā (On Arabic rhetoric and language);
- Al-Imām Mālik ibn Anas
- Al-Mujaddidūn fī al-Islām (“The Renewers of Islam”)
- Al-gundiyyat wa-al-silm
- Manāhig al-tagdīd fī al-naḥw wa-al-balāġat wa-al-tafsīr wa-al-adab (“New Curriculum in Grammar, Rhetoric, Interpretation and Literature”)
- Kitāb al-hayr: dirāsat mawsūiyyat li-l-falsafat al-adabiyyat: (“The Great Book: An Encyclopedic Study of Literary Philosophy”)
- Dirāsāt luġawiyyat (“Linguistic Studies”)
- Fī al-adab al-miṣrī (On Egyptian Civilization).
