= Neo-Mu'tazilites =

Modern movement of Mu'tazilite theology

- Men of the Aligarh Movement. Founded in British India by Syed Ahmad Khan, the movement is credited with reviving the rational theology of the Neo-Mu'tazilites.
- Type: Theological and intellectual movement
- Classification: Islam
- Scripture: Qur'an; Islamic religious texts
- Theology: Qur'an-centric; Harmonization of reason (aql) and revelation; Opposition to Islamic conservatism, taqlid, and fatalism; Literary textual analysis; Criticism of hadith (ranging from the frequent rejection of non-mutawatir hadith to total rejection of the hadith corpus)
- Structure: Decentralised by design (no clergy)
- Founder: No single founder
- Origin: Emerged in the 19th–20th centuries CE; deeply connected to the Nahda (Arab Renaissance) and Islamic modernism

Neo-Mu'tazilites (Arabic: المُعْتَزِلَةُ الجُدُدُ; al-Muʿtazila al-Judud), also called Neo-Mu'tazila or New Mu'tazila, are modern Muslims, often reformers and revivalists, inspired by the principles of the classical Mu'tazila school of theology, which flourished during the early Abbasid Caliphate. Neo-Mu'tazilites draw inspiration from Mu'tazilite ideals to revive the scientific and intellectual dynamism of the Islamic Golden Age. Neo-Mu'tazilism stands in relation to the "renaissance" (Nahda) of the Arab world and to modern Islamic reformism, which opposes Islamic conservatism, taqlid of the earlier generations, and fatalism.

Neo-Mu'tazilites operate within a flexible intellectual framework adapted from classical Mu'tazila thought, which modern thinkers use to reconcile Islamic rationalism with contemporary worldviews. By harmonizing human reason (aql) with divine revelation—often utilizing literary textual analysis, classical hadith criticism, or traditional kalam metaphysics—they bridge diverse currents of thought. As key figures within Islamic modernism, they critique traditions that are not strictly Qur'anic and that stand in the way of "legitimate" progress.

== Term ==
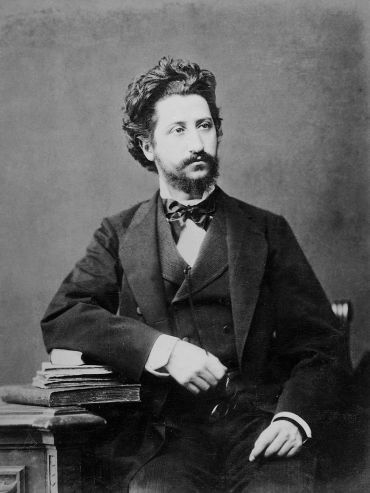
Hungarian scholar of Islam Ignác Goldziher (d. 1921 CE) first coined the term "Neo-Mu'tazila" and analyzed the evolution of its two distinct contemporary movements in Egypt and India.

Introduced into Western scholarship by Hungarian orientalist Ignác Goldziher to describe contemporaneous South Asian Islamic modernists like Syed Ameer Ali, the label "Neo-Mu'tazilism" has since expanded to encompass several distinct contemporary currents. It is applied directly to thinkers who self-identify as Neo-Mu'tazila, those who deeply engage with the theological doctrines of the classical Mu'tazila school, and those for whom the tradition holds a more symbolic meaning. This diverse intellectual framework spans geographical and cultural divides from West Asia to South Asia and Southeast Asia.

While the designation frequently describes earlier 19th-century CE reformers who championed rationalism—such as Syed Ahmad Khan, Khayr al-Din al-Tunisi, and Jamal al-Din al-Afghani—it is also regularly used for modern Muslims inspired by classical Mu'tazilite texts rediscovered in Yemen during the 20th century CE.

== Beliefs ==
Neo-Mu'tazilites promote Islamic reformism and revivalism.

=== Scripture and reason ===
Like their classical predecessors, Neo-Mu'tazilites emphasize the use of reason (aql) when interpreting Islamic scripture. They believe in harmonizing human reason with divine revelation—often utilizing literary textual analysis, classical hadith criticism, or traditional kalam metaphysics. Their understanding of Islamic scripture has included expanding the use of ijtihad (independent reasoning) while de-emphasising the authority of hadith and the concept of ijma (consensus).

The Neo-Mu'tazila definition of godly mental attributes relies on man's empathetic cognitive understanding of justice. According to the Neo-Mu'tazila, justice is the most important mental attribute of God. Justice as a quality is associated with cognition, and it is the means by which man connects with God.

Neo-Mu'tazilism, alongside parallel movements like "New Averroists" or "Neo-Ibn Rushdians" who draw on the intellectual legacy of Averroism (Arabic: رشدية), forms a cornerstone of contemporary progressive thinking in the Muslim world by advocating for the use of reason.

Some Neo-Mu'tazilites, such as Syed Ahmad Khan, maintained that the original spiritual truths of early Islamic holy books—including the Tawrat (Torah) and the Injil (Gospel)—were still intact and compatible with Islamic theology. By utilizing kalam (Islamic rational theology)—a field in which the Mu'tazilites were the main pioneers by the 10th century CE—to bridge perceived contradictions, Syed argued that these scriptures remain valid when interpreted rationally and sympathetically (see Muslim Hebraism).

=== The nature of the Qur'an ===
They also uphold the core historical Mu'tazilite tenet that the Qur'an is God's "created" word and not uncreated or co-eternal with God, in contrast to Sunni theology. Neo-Mu'tazilites do not reject the axiomatic divinity of the Qur'an. For Neo-Mu'tazilites, the contents of the Qur'an ultimately go back to God. However, they do ask who undertook the formulation of the Qur'an's language – God, the angels, or Muhammad himself.

Neo-Mu'tazilites use modern science to prove the Qur'an's miraculous nature, while also emphasizing its literary uniqueness and adopting a literary approach to its interpretation. They pay much attention to functionalism, emphasizing the practical and applied issues of Islam in the personal, social, and political spheres of life.

=== Sunnah and Hadith ===
Neo-Mu'tazilites diverge from the majority of Sunni scholars regarding their understanding of the Sunnah. They also echo earlier Mu'tazilite views by rejecting hadiths that seem irrational or incompatible with reason, such as those describing Muhammad splitting the moon, water flowing from his fingers, or stones glorifying him in his hand (see Miracles of Muhammad). They maintain a highly skeptical view of the hadith literature; their positions range from accepting only a minimal number of mutawatir (mass-transmitted) hadiths—in some cases as few as five—to rejecting the hadith corpus entirely.

According to the Egyptian Neo-Mu'tazilite Muhammad Abduh, "In the case of non-mutawatir hadiths, whoever feels comfortable with them can believe them. But no one can be forced to believe in them or be declared an unbeliever for rejecting them".

=== Ethics and civilization ===
In matters of faith and ethics, Neo-Mu'tazilites emphasise the possibility of freedom in the face of divine omnipotence and rational notions of good and evil.

Modern thinkers linked to Neo-Mu'tazilism have differed from Salafis on how they view Islamic history following the end of the period of the four Rightly-Guided Caliphs (Abu Bakr, Umar ibn al-Khattab, Uthman ibn Affan, and Ali ibn Abi Talib). Salafis tend to focus on a total decline in religious purity after this early era. However, Neo-Mu'tazila thinkers argue that Islamic jurisprudence (Fiqh) actually advanced further in Baghdad than it did in the Arabian Peninsula. They state that in the border regions of Islam in Iraq, various different nations (aqwam) entered the community (al-milla) and established a more developed civilization than the civilization of Medina. This "civilizational environment" of Iraq is highlighted for fostering a wide range of views and facilitating the use of aql (reason) and qiyas (analogy) in the interpretation of scripture. The Neo-Mu'tazilite scholar Ahmad Amin, for example, regarded the peak of Mu'tazilite influence in the Abbasid Caliphate—which coincided with the reigns of al-Ma'mun, al-Mu'tasim, and al-Wathiq—as the "golden age" of Islamic civilization and the "age of reason".

Neo-Mu'tazilites draw inspiration from Mu'tazilite ideals to revive the scientific and intellectual dynamism of the Islamic Golden Age.

=== Gender and contemporary studies ===
Some Muslim feminists, described as "Progressive Neo-Mu'tazili feminists", use Mu'tazilite ideas to pose new questions in the contemporary fields of gender and religious studies. They often do not attempt to revive the scholastic categories of the medieval mutakallimun.

== Historical development ==
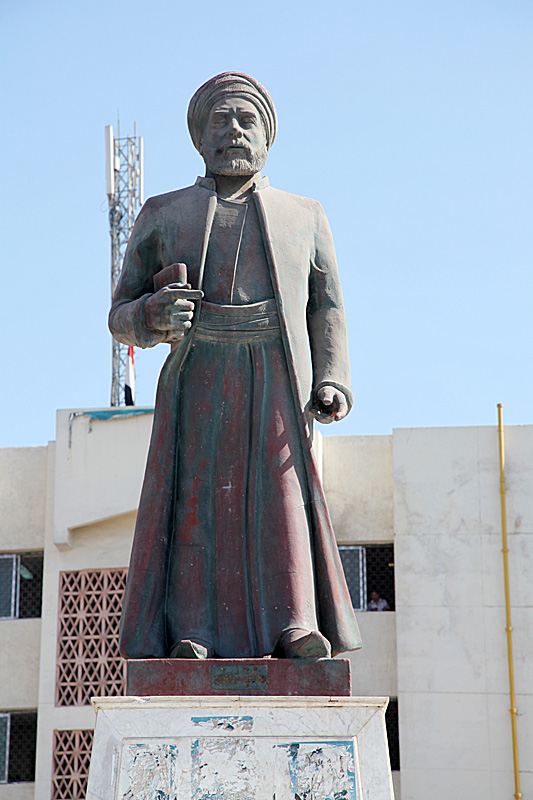
Statue of Muhammad Abduh in Damanhour, Egypt

The Aligarh Movement, founded in British India by Syed Ahmad Khan, is credited with reviving the rational theology of the Neo-Mu'tazilites. Syed's reformist program included a rationalist, Neo-Mu'tazilite understanding of Islamic scripture, questioning much of the corpus of hadith as either apocryphal or relevant only to the Islamic prophet Muhammad's day and age, rejecting the validity of ijma, broadening the horizon of ijtihad, and interpreting Biblical scripture from a sympathetic Muslim point of view (see Muslim Hebraism). Syed also combined theological naturalism with Neo-Mu'tazilism.

Syed's Muslim commentary on the Tawrat and the Injil, called Tabyin al-Kalam in Urdu, used kalam (Islamic rational theology)—a field in which the Mu'tazilites were the main pioneers by the 10th century CE—to discuss and explain perceived contradictions between the Qur'an and earlier scriptures, especially the Book of Genesis and the Gospel of Matthew. He maintained that the original spiritual truths of the Tawrat and the Injil were still intact and compatible with Islamic theology when interpreted rationally.

Other early Neo-Mu'tazilites include Jamal al-Din al-Afghani and Muhammad Abduh. They used traditional, logical arguments to defend Islam against Western intellectual attacks.

The later stage of the movement coincided with the 20th-century rediscovery of original Mu'tazila manuscripts in regions like Yemen and India. With access to these primary sources, the later Neo-Mu'tazilite movement shifted its foundational thinking toward modern science and experimental reason. This modern school combines religious faith with scientific awareness and has grown significantly within Egypt's academic and scientific communities.

Dating primarily to the 12th and 13th centuries CE, these recovered texts shed new light on a historical Yemeni tradition that was deeply committed to Basran Mu'tazilism (Bahshamiyya) though some documents originated from the Baghdad school. During this period, these schools in Yemen were opposed by orthodox Shia Zaydi scholars, who tried to bring back what they saw as an authentic version of Zaydism by completely rejecting Mu'tazilite influence. Despite this historical conflict, many Mu'tazilite books survived to become the backbone of modern Neo-Mu'tazilite thought.

Among the discovered Mu'tazilite texts were the works of Abu al-Qasim al-Balkhi, including Ketāb qabūl al-aḵbār wa maʿrefat al-reǰāl. In this book, he presents a thorough and sometimes sarcastic criticism of many early authorities on hadith. Another important text was Al-Qadi Abd al-Jabbar's Usool al-Khamsa (The Five Principles). These five core Mu'tazilite doctrines consist of: Divine Unity (Al-Tawhid), Divine Justice (Al-Adl), The Promise and the Threat (Al-Wa'd wa al-Wa'id), The Intermediate Position (Al-Manzila bayn al-manzilatayn), and Enjoining Good and Forbidding Evil (Al-Amr bi al-ma'ruf wa al-nahy an al-munkar). According to al-Jabbar, one of the important and extensive discussions of the Mu'tazilites about the Qur'an is their belief in its createdness.

== Around the world ==
In the modern period, Neo-Mu'tazilism has developed in various regions.

=== Egypt ===
In Egypt, with its experimental and scientific interpretation, as well as the necessity of combining religious faith with intellectual awareness, Neo-Mu'tazilism has grown significantly among scientific and academic societies. Neo-Mu'tazilites like the Egyptian judge Muhammad Sa'id al-Ashmawi say that God's wisdom in the Qur'an must fit with human reason. It must also fit with the practical needs of modern national life. They believe reading the Qur'an means finding symbolic meanings. To do this, people must study the language, history, and context, just like they do with other literature.

=== France ===
The "Association for the Renaissance of Mu'tazilite Islam" (French: Association pour la renaissance de l’Islam mutazilite, ARIM) was founded in France in February 2017 by Eva Janadin and Faker Korchane. The organisation opposes excessive rationalism that leads to positivism, sectarianism, and clerical authority, as well as taqlid of the Salaf's interpretations.

=== India and Pakistan ===
Neo-Mu'tazilites form the main composites of the Indo-Pakistan Muslim society today, alongside Barelvis, Deobandis, and Ahl-i Hadith.

=== Iran ===
Modern Shia thinkers in Iran who also identify as Neo-Mu'tazilites believe in the pre-eminent role assigned to reason and the affirmation that the Qur'an is the word of the Islamic prophet Muhammad under divine inspiration rather than the immediate word of God. Politically, they oppose Ruhollah Khomeini's Velayat-e faqih, the system where jurists have absolute power, because they believe it is not supported by Sharia. To bring political pluralism to Shi'ism, they argue that the clergy should not hold special power over society, and they criticize Iranian Shia schools for favouring hadith over the Qur'an. Additionally, they defend the freedom of women to wear or remove the veil (hijab).

=== Maghreb ===
Modern Mu'tazilism exists in the Maghreb through the Wasiliyah movement. Named after the reputed founder of the Mu'tazila, Wasil ibn Ata, the group uses the mantle of the Mu'tazila primarily as an identity marker.

=== Saudi Arabia ===
In Saudi Arabia, Crown Prince Mohammed bin Salman's legal rhetoric and Islamic legal reformation mirror the Neo-Mu'tazila approach by rejecting taqlid and advocating for ijtihad. This allows for the questioning of Wahhabi tradition and adapts Islamic jurisprudence to modernity.

=== Yemen ===
In Yemen, Neo-Mu'tazilites use history to change how Shia Zaydis understand the role of the Imam, who acts as the traditional political and religious leader. A major part of their argument is that foundational early figures like Zayd ibn Ali and Al-Qasim al-Rassi did not view the Hashemite Imamate as an absolute pillar (asl) of Zaydi jurisprudence. Instead, they claim a later leader named Ali al-Hadi introduced this strict family requirement as a temporary measure to protect society against a historical background of Qarmatian anarchy, bloodshed, and chaos.

== Criticism ==
Salafi scholar Muhammad Nasir al-Din al-Albani grouped the "old and new Mu'tazilah" together among what he termed "misguided sects"—alongside the Jabriyya, the Qadariyyah, the Khawarij, and the Ibadis—that do not claim to deny the Book or the Sunnah, yet oppose "the path of the believers" and fail to hold fast to what "the Messenger and his Companions were upon". Notably, al-Albani stated that he did not mean only the old and new Mu'tazilah, adding that "the people of the Sunnah and the community today" (i.e. the Sunnis) and the "majority of Muslims" pay no attention to "the methodology of the righteous Salaf". According to al-Albani, "the origin of the disagreement" is that they opposed the believers who explained the Qur'an and the Sunnah, and departed from the creed stated by Abd Allah ibn al-Mubarak, one of the shaykhs of Ahmad ibn Hanbal.

According to Fouad bin Abd al-Alaziz al-Shalhoub, a traditional Salafist, Neo-Mu'tazilites give reason over quotation, interpreting the Qur'an in contradiction to the interpretation of the predecessors while interpreting verses and texts in a manner consistent with reason or recent scientific discoveries. He states that they refute hadiths that cannot be interpreted—whether recurrent or single, in the two "Sahih Books" (Sahih al-Bukhari and Sahih Muslim) or in others—and "refute the Companions and their Followers", especially the narrators of hadiths, while "denying" miracles and many unseen things such as angels, jinn, and magic. Furthermore, al-Shalhoub argues that they call for "rapprochement between Muslims and infidels and the unity of religions, divide the Sunnah into practical and non-practical ones so they are not obligated to follow the latter, call for nationalism, and hold distinct attitudes towards women, hijab, and polygamy".

== Notable individuals ==
- Syed Ahmad Khan (d. 1898 CE). He combined theological naturalism with Neo-Mu'tazilism.
- Syed Ameer Ali (d. 1928 CE), an Indian jurist, writer, and Muslim leader who has been described as a Neo-Mu'tazilite. In his intellectual development, he was greatly influenced by Karamat Ali Jaunpuri (d. 1876 CE), a family friend who had written an Urdu treatise in the rationalistic Mu'tazili tradition of Shi'i scholasticism. Later in life, he helped to establish the first mosque in London.
- Ahmad Amin (d. 1954 CE), a chief proponent of Neo-Mu'tazilism in Egypt. He described the main principles of Mu'tazilism and was critical of hadith. He was known for his rationalist approach to the Qur'an and Sunnah, and he proposed Mu'tazilism in his famous trilogy: Fajr al-Islam (The Dawn of Islam), Duha al-Islam (The Morning of Islam), and Zuhr al-Islam (The Noon of Islam).
- Harun Nasution (d. 1998 CE), an Indonesian scholar who sought to reconcile philosophical Sufism with Neo-Mu'tazilism.
- Amin Nayif Diyab (d. 2006 CE), a Jordanian scholar whose interpretation of the Mu'tazila occupied a special position in the context of a caliphate-oriented Islamism.
- Abdolkarim Soroush, an Iranian Shia philosopher who identifies as a Neo-Mu'tazilite, although he has also been influenced by Ash'arism and Rumi alongside Mu'tazilism. While he shares some views with the Mu'tazilites, he disagrees with them on certain points, arguing that they relied too heavily on pure philosophy. Instead, he favors an empirical approach based on experience and science, which is more aligned with the Ash'arites.
- Dr. Taj Hargey, a British imam who founded the Open Mosque in Cape Town, South Africa. He identifies as a freethinker and promotes a "new Mu'tazilism". He supports a liberal form of Islam and rejects hadith.

== See also ==
- Islamic philosophy
- Muslim Hebraists
- Criticism of hadith
- Islamic archaeology
- Non-denominational Muslim
- Al-Kindi
- Islamic Golden Age
- Renaissance
- Faith and rationality
- Relationship between science and religion
