= Rezgar Akrawi =

Iraqi writer, author and journalist

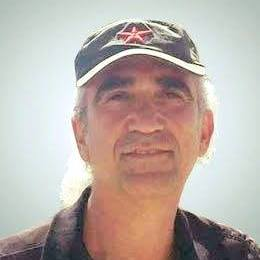
- Born: 1966 (age 59–60); Akre, Iraq
- Notable work: founder of the "Al-Hewar Al-Mutamaden – Modern discussion foundation" and the term: “electronic left”
- Awards: Ibn Rushd Prize for Freedom of Thought representing the "Al-Hewar Al-Mutamaden – Modern discussion foundation".

Rezgar Akrawi (Kurdish: ڕزگار ئاکراوی, romanized: Rizgār Akrāwī) is a Kurdish writer, author, and journalist. He was born in 1966 in Iraqi Kurdistan, in Akre city. He was one of the leading cadres in the Iraqi Communist Party from 1984 until 1990, after which he participated with the Communist Current Organization until 1992 before becoming one of the leaders of the Worker-communist Party of Iraq from 1993 until 2000. He was the first to introduce the concept of the electronic left. He was the winner of the Ibn Rushd Prize for Freedom of Thought in 2010 in the name of his website "Al-Hewar Al-Mutamaden – Modern discussion" in addition to being the coordinator of the Center for Studies and Research of Marxism and the Left. He has dozens of studies, research, and intellectual and political articles published in several Arab magazines such as Al-Hayat and Regai Kurdistan, in addition to his research published on the civilized dialogue website and in a large number of websites.

== Electronic left ==
=== Introduction and name ===
Rezgar Akrawi put forward the concepts of the Electronic Left (E-Left) (Arabic: اليسار الإلكتروني) since the beginning of 2002 in various articles, dialogues and interviews. To be a modern, scientific, democratic concept of the left, its political speech, its organization, its work, its management and its leadership. To be compatible with the development technological, cognitive and human rights in various fields and the great change that has occurred in the mechanisms of dealing, interaction, organization and awareness of the masses due to the great technological and information revolution.

According to his description, capitalism develops itself over the course of a minute in all fields, and to replace it with more humane and fair systems, the left must be developed in thought and action in a very large way. Thus, the term "electronic left" is a designation that presents a new concept of the left in the current situation concurrent with continuous development. As well as to develop its work and struggle for a better, superior and better political, economic, social and environmental option that is possible for the human being, similar to the new common terms nowadays such as (electronic administration, e-government...etc.), which are developmental concepts of the previous concepts. Just as the term, e-government expresses government with the same recognized foundations, but with a significant change in work mechanisms through management, leadership, transparency, and the great use of scientific and technical development. The term e-left does not differ from the classic left in terms of principles, but it aims to build a new way in managing and organizing leftist movements.

=== Theoretical and intellectual foundations ===
- Not to rely on a specific ideological current, but rather on the cognitive, scientific and rational development of socialist, leftist and humanist thought, and international human rights charters.
- Work to build and strengthen independent labor and professional federations and unions in accordance with international labor rights charters
- Putting forward policies and programs according to what is possible and not what is required
- Benefiting from the positive experiences of all Marxist schools, in addition to reviewing Marxist thought and its schools to benefit from the technological, scientific and cognitive development in political, organizational, media, economic, social, cultural and environmental work.
- Neutralizing the role of religion from the state while ensuring freedom of religion and belief.
- Neutralizing the role of nationalism from the state while ensuring equal citizenship.
- Full equality for women and positive distinction, and defends the independence of women's organizations and their work in accordance with international women's rights charters.
- Focusing on work and struggle within the framework of a broad, multi-platform social, progressive left movement.

=== Organizational foundations ===
The Electronic Left Movement considers that communication networks have led to a great development in the cognitive and democratic awareness, and therefore it sees the need to introduce new and flexible organizational mechanisms among the forces of the left, where the movement presents its ideas:

- The Electronic Left presents new flexible organizational mechanisms for building and left-wing partisan work as a kind of – alliances and modern democratic federal organizations – that do not adopt excessive hierarchical centralization and allow decentralization and great freedom for party organizations to decide their policies, whether on the ideological, geographical, or regional level or according to different demands issues .
- New mechanisms in party membership based on the concept of alliance, cooperation and democratic collective action, and not on belonging according to a hierarchical concept. With a strict central authority that allows the member complete freedom to work according to his intellectual and political orientations, which can correspond to the leftist party organization or part of it, and exceed all Types of organizational militarism and strict party discipline, and he has the right to join more than one leftist party. For example, he finds that he has different approaches with more than one political party and in different policies. He also calls for choosing different forms and degrees of flexible membership (active, supportive, temporary, electronic..etc.) That allows organizational work according to personal and life circumstances and according to the development of each country.
- Acknowledgment of the multiplicity of platforms, diligence, and various left-wing intellectual and organizational blocs within the organizational institution. In addition to the free and open partisan press, so that the partisan media is a broad platform for all in the party and from outside bearers of leftist, progressive and humanitarian ideas, and even critical of the left and its organizations as a kind of respect for the other opinion.
- The partisan base is the source of authority in the left's parties and organizations, and the collective mind and decision should be the basis of the electronic left organizations.
- Abolition of all positions and designations that could entrench individual authorities (such as the Secretary-General, Secretary, President, Leader...etc.) and the strengthening of collective leadership in the party and from both genders.
- Developing the capabilities of its members and leaders in absorbing and using technological, technical and scientific development, especially information technology, the Internet and communication networks.

=== Participants in the dialogue about the electronic left ===
A large group of Arab women writers and men writers participated in the dialogue about the electronic left, most notably: Mohammed Ali Muqalad, Farid Al-Olaybi, Abdulrahman Al-Nudha, Fouad Al-Nimri, Uthri Mazigh, Bashir Al-Hamidi, Mohammed Dower, Mohammed Youssif Baker, Sabah Kanji, Maryam Najma, Dana Jalal and Simon Khoury.

== Modern discussion ==
Modern discussionwas – Al-Hewar Al-Mutamaden established in 2001 to be one of the first and largest forms of organized electronic left struggle in the Arab world, which proposed a new form of modern leftist struggle, making optimal use of information technology, the multi-platform left, openness, respect for opinion and the other opinion, and renunciation of the monopoly of absolute truth. In addition, civilized dialogue put forward a contemporary concept of the left in accordance with the technical, cognitive and human rights development, towards more openness, pluralism, effectiveness and interaction with the rapid development at all levels.

Modern discussion is a voluntary and self-financed organization. It publishes through it many thinkers, writers and women writers from different countries of the Arab world and in various disciplines.

== Notable participations ==
- Spokesperson for Iraqi asylum seekers in Denmark 1994–1995.
- Member of Amnesty International 1998–2002.
- Member of the administrative board of the Iraqi Society for Human Rights – Denmark 1998–2000.
- Co-founder of the Right to Life Center for the abolition of the death penalty in the Arab world.
- Co-founder of the Center for Women's Equality.

== Awards ==
- Ibn Rushd Prize for Free Thought representing the "Al-Hewar Al-Mutamaden – Modern discussion foundation".
