= Literary interpretation of the Quran =

Approach to Quranic interpretation

Literary interpretation of the Qur'an focuses on analyzing it as a literary text, emphasizing its linguistic, stylistic, and rhetorical features. This method was advocated by Amin al-Khuli, who argued that it is the only approach that can fully explain the Qur'an's inimitability, known as i'jaz. His ideas were later expanded upon and supported by his pupil, Muhammad Ahmad Khalafallah.

== History ==
The history of the literary approach to the Qur'an can be traced back to the third century of the Hijra (ninth century CE) in Islamic culture. It arose from theological debates concerning i'jaz, the doctrine of the Qur'an's inimitability, which holds a central place in Islamic thought.

In the modern period, the literary interpretation of the Quran was prominently shaped by Muhammad Ahmad Khalafallah and his professor, Amin al-Khuli, both of whom were influenced by the Islamic reform movement initiated by Muhammad Abduh. Taha Husayn and al-Khuli built upon some of 'Abduh's ideas. For al-Khuli, the study of the Quran's literary qualities was crucial because the Arabs' acceptance of the Quran is grounded in its literary superiority. Consequently, he argued that literary analysis should take precedence over other approaches, whether religious, philosophical, ethical, mystical, or legal. Ahmad Khalafallah's Ph.D. thesis expanded on al-Khuli's approach and heavily cited Abduh's Tafsir al-Manar to bolster his arguments, which sparked significant controversy in Egypt.

In Western academic studies of the Qur'an, there has been a significant development in the literary approach, which incorporates lexicography, codicology, and textual criticism for analysing the Quranic text.

== Themes ==
=== Historicity of Quranic stories ===
One of the most important themes of the modern literary approach to the Qur'an is its engagement with the question of the historicity of Quranic stories. Muhammad 'Abduh argued that the Quran should not be seen as a historical document. Instead, its narratives use a literary style to convey moral and spiritual lessons, focusing on ethical, spiritual, and religious purposes rather than historical accuracy.

There is no doubt that the literary approach does not by any means intend to damage the Qur'an or even to question its divine and holy nature. Its position is that religious texts, though divine and revealed by God, are historically determined and culturally constructed. As a "message" revealed from God to man through Prophet Muhammad, who is the Messenger of God and who is human himself, the Qur'an represents a communicative model that includes a sender and a receiver through a code of a linguistic system.

— Nasr Abu Zayd, The Dilemma of the Literary Approach to the Qur'an, 2003

Abu Zayd contends that, because the divine source of the Quran cannot be subjected to scientific study, analysis of the Quran should focus on its historical and cultural context. This includes the socio-political conditions surrounding its original audience, as well as the cultural ideas reflected in the language of the Quran. By exploring these factors, a scientific understanding of the text can be developed. He concludes that the Quran is, fundamentally, a product of its cultural context.

=== Literary features ===
According to Muntasir Mir, The Qur'an demonstrates a masterful use of language through words and phrases, incorporating figures of speech, satire, and irony. It employs a range of narrative and dramatic techniques, presenting characters who, despite limited personal details, emerge as striking and memorable figures.

== Criticism ==
Nasr Abu Zaid summarized several objections to Ahmad Khalafallah's literary perspective on the Quran. Critics argued that the Quran, being the word of God, should not be compared to human literary works. They contended that treating the Quran as a literary composition implies it was authored by Muhammad. Furthermore, the idea that the Quran's stories are not historical facts, as the literary approach proposes, is seen as blasphemous and undermines the Quran's status, reducing it even below that of a historical document. Finally, the idea that the Quran's language and structure are shaped by historical and cultural factors is viewed as reducing the Quran to merely a human text.

== Sources ==
- Abu-Zayd, Nasr (2003). "The Dilemma of the Literary Approach to the Qur'an". Alif: Journal of Comparative Poetics (23): 8. doi:10.2307/1350075. JSTOR 1350075.
- Mir, Mustansir (1988). "The Qur'an as Literature". Religion & Literature. 20 (1). The University of Notre Dame: 49–64. ISSN 0888-3769. JSTOR 40059366.
- Zadesh, Travis (2021). "Quranic Studies and the Literary Turn". Journal of the American Oriental Society. 135 (2). doi:10.7817/jameroriesoci.135.2.329. ISSN 2169-2289.
