= Islamic modernism =

Movement to reconcile Islam with modern values

Islamic modernism is a movement attempting to reconcile the Islamic faith with values perceived as modern such as democracy, civil rights, rationality, equality, and social progress. It featured a "critical reexamination of the classical conceptions and methods of jurisprudence", and a new approach to Islamic theology and Quranic exegesis (Tafsir). A contemporary definition describes it as an "effort to re-read Islam's fundamental sources—the Qur'an and the Sunna, (the practice of the Prophet)—by placing them in their historical context, and then reassessing them in the light of the modern context." It has been described as "the first Muslim ideological response to the Western cultural challenge". (Note: "Islamic modernism was the first Muslim ideological response to the Western cultural challenge. Started in India and Egypt in the second part of the 19th century ... reflected in the work of a group of like-minded Muslim scholars, featuring a critical reexamination of the classical conceptions and methods of jurisprudence and a formulation of a new approach to Islamic theology and Quranic exegesis. This new approach, which was nothing short of an outright rebellion against Islamic orthodoxy, displayed astonishing compatibility with the ideas of the Enlightenment.")

It was one of several Islamic movements—including Islamic secularism, Islamism, and Salafism—that emerged in the middle of the 19th century in reaction to the rapid changes of the time, especially the hegemony of Western civilization and colonialism imposed on the Muslim world. Islamic modernism differs from secularism in that it insists on the importance of religious faith in public life, and from Salafism or Islamism in that it embraces contemporary European institutions, social processes, and values. One expression of Islamic modernism, formulated by Mahathir Mohamad, is that "only when Islam is interpreted so as to be relevant in a world which is different from what it was 1400 years ago, can Islam be regarded as a religion for all ages."

Prominent leaders of the movement include Sir Sayyid Ahmed Khan, Namık Kemal, Rifa'a al-Tahtawi, Muhammad Abduh (former Sheikh of Al-Azhar University), Jamal ad-Din al-Afghani, and South Asian poet Muhammad Iqbal. Since its inception, Islamic modernism has suffered from co-option of its original reformism by both secularist rulers and by "the official ulama" whose task is to legitimise rulers' actions in religious terms.

== Themes, arguments and positions ==
Some themes in modern Islamic thought include:

- The acknowledgement "with varying degrees of criticism or emulation", of the technological, scientific and legal achievements of the West; while at the same time objecting "to Western colonial exploitation of Muslim countries and the imposition of Western secular values" and aiming to develop a modern and dynamic understanding of science among Muslims that would strengthen the Muslim world and prevent further exploitation.
  - After traveling to Europe in the late 19th century, Muhammad Abduh came back so impressed with the order and prosperity he saw, he told Egyptians: "I went to the West and saw Islam, but no Muslims; I got back to the East and saw Muslims, but no Islam."
  - Sayyid Ahmed Khan was said to have not only admired the accomplishments of Britain but to have had an "emotional attachment" to the country.

=== Beliefs ===
Syed Ahmad Khan sought to harmonize scripture with modern knowledge of natural science; to bridge "the gap between science and religious truth" by "abandoning literal interpretations" of scripture, and questioning the methodology of the collectors of sahih hadith, i.e. questioning whether what are thought to be some of the most accurately passed down narrations of what the Prophet said and did, are actually divinely revealed.

==== Supernatural beings ====
Some non-literal interpretations Ahmed Khan came to were:

- Angels are not beings created from light but "properties" of things or conceptualisations of the divine moral support which encourages man in his endeavors.
- Jinn are not beings with free will created from fire, but "projections of evil desires".

=== Islamic law ===
Chiragh Ali (1844–1895) and Syed Ahmad Khan (1817–1898) argued that "the Islamic code of law is not unalterable and unchangeable", and instead could be adopted "to the social and political revolutions going on around it".

- "Objectives" of Islamic law (maqasid al-sharia) in support of "public interest", (or maslahah, a secondary source for Islamic jurisprudence) were invoked. This was done by Islamic reformists in "many parts of the globe to justify initiatives not addressed in classical commentaries but regarded as of urgent political and ethical concern."
- Traditional Islamic law was reinterpreted using the four traditional sources of Islamic jurisprudence – the holy book of Islam (Quran), the reported deeds and sayings of Muhammad (hadith), consensus of the theologians (ijma) and juristic reasoning by analogy (qiyas), plus another source—independent reasoning to find a solution to a legal question (ijtihad).
  - the first two sources (the Quran and hadith) were taken and reinterpreted "to transform the last two (ijma and qiyas) in order to formulate a reformist project in light of the prevailing standards of scientific rationality and modern social theory."
  - traditional Islamic law was restricted by limiting its basis to the Quran and authentic Sunnah, i.e. limiting the Sunna with radical hadith criticism. (Note: Muhammad 'Abduh, for example, said a Muslim was obliged to accept only mutawatir hadith, and was free to reject others about which he had doubts. Ahmad Amin, in his popular series on Islamic cultural history, cautiously suggested that there were few if any mutawatir hadith (especially, Fajr al-Islam, 10th ed. Cairo: Maktabat al-Nahda al-Misriyya, 1965, p. 218; see also G. H. A. Juynboll, The Authenticity of the Tradition Literature: Discussions in Modern Egypt (Leiden: Brill, 1969), and my Faith of a Modern Muslim Intellectual, p. 113.)
  - ijtihad was employed not to only in the traditional, narrow way to arrive at legal rulings in unprecedented cases, i.e. where Quran, hadith, and rulings of earlier jurists are silent, but for critical independent reasoning in all domains of thought, and perhaps even approving of its use by non-jurists.

==== Polygamy, jihad, bank loans, punishments, feminism ====
These more or less radical (re)interpretations (above) of the authoritative sources applied particularly to cases of Quranic verses or hadith where literal interpretations conflicts with "modern" views: polygyny, the hadd (penal) punishments (chopping off hands, administering lashes, etc.), treatment of unbelievers, waging of jihad, banning of usury or interest on loans (riba). (Note: See Quran 4:3 on polygyny in Islam, Quran 5:38 on cutting off the hand of the thief, Quran 24:2, 24:3, 24:4, and 24:5 on whipping for fornication (the provision of stoning for adultery is in the hadith). On jihad and the treatment of unbelievers, the difficult passages for modernists are the so-called "Verses of the Sword", such as Quran 9:5 on the Arab Pagans and Quran 9:29 on the People of the Book.)

- On the topic of Jihad, Islamic scholars like Ibn al-Amir al-San'ani, Muhammad Abduh, Rashid Rida, Ubaidullah Sindhi, Yusuf al-Qaradawi, and Shibli Nomani (1851–1914) distinguished between defensive Jihad (Jihad al-daf) and offensive Jihad (Jihad al-talab or Jihad of choice). They refuted the notion of consensus on Jihad al-talab being a communal obligation (fard kifaya). In support of this view, these scholars referred to the works of classical scholars such as Al-Jassas, Ibn Taymiyya, etc. According to Ibn Taymiyya, the reason for Jihad against non-Muslims is not their disbelief but the threat they pose to Muslims. Citing Ibn Taymiyya, scholars like Rashid Rida, Al San'ani, Qaradawi, etc. argues that unbelievers need not be fought unless they pose a threat to Muslims. Thus, Jihad is obligatory only as a defensive warfare to respond to aggression or "perfidy" against the Muslim community, and that the "normal and desired state" between Islamic and non-Islamic territories was one of "peaceful coexistence". Similarly the 18th-century Islamic scholar Muhammad ibn Abd al-Wahhab defined Jihad as a defensive military action to protect the Muslim community, and emphasized its defensive aspect in synchrony with later 20th century Islamic writers.
- Mahmud Shaltut also argued unbelief was not sufficient cause for declaring jihad, and that the conversion to Islam by unbelievers in fear of death at the hands of jihadists (mujahideen) was unlikely to prove sincere or lasting. Much preferable means of conversion was education. They pointed to the verse "There is no compulsion in religion.".^{[Quran 2:256]}
- On the matter of jurist orthodoxy that forbid any and all interest on bank loans, deposits, etc. as riba (usury), Syed Ahmad Khan, Fazlur Rahman Malik, Muhammad Abduh, Rashid Rida, Abd El-Razzak El-Sanhuri, Muhammad Asad, Mahmoud Shaltout all argued that there was a difference between interest and usury (excessive charging of interest). These jurists took precedent for their position from the classical scholar Ibn Taymiyya who argued in his treatise "The Removal of Blames from the Great Imams", that scholars are divided on the prohibition of riba al-fadl. Ibn Qayyim al-Jawziyya (1292–1350 CE), the student of Ibn Taymiyya, argued that under a compelling need, an item may be sold with delay in return for dirhams or for another weighed substance despite implicating riba al-nasi'ah.
- Concerning Hudud/hadd, (punishments determined in the Quran, i.e. for murder, adultery, slander and theft, ranging from lashing to stoning to death, amputation of hands and crucifixion), specifically the cutting off the hand of the thief, the "classic modernist argument" is that it should be applied only in a "perfectly just" Islamic society where "there is no want", i.e. where no one steals anything because they need it and can't afford it.
- According to Mansoor Moaddel, the "modernist exegesis" of the Quran advanced by scholars such as Sayyid Ahmad Khan, Chiragh Ali, Amir Ali (1849–1928), Shibli Nomani, and Mumtaz Ali (1860–1935) supported "Islamic feminism" – including women's education and involvement in social affairs, and opposition to polygamy. Triple-talaq divorce has also been attacked by Muslim modernists.

==== Government ====
Contrary to the traditional (and especially the Islamist) belief that the Caliphate or imamate is "mandated" by Islam, some modernists argue that this is not supported by the Quran or what is known about the preaching and life of Muhammad. Taha Hussein (1889-1973) says:

Government in the time of the Prophet was not delegated from heaven in its details; people were left free to manage their affairs as they wish within the limits of fairness and justice. Furthermore, the Quran did not propose, in general terms or in detail, a political system, and the Prophet did not indicate who should be his successor either orally or in written form.

Searching the Quran and Hadith, Egyptian religious scholar and judge in religious courts Ali Abdel Raziq (1888-1966) also found no mention of the position of caliph, of the caliphate, of government or state.

In the same vein, late 20th century Modernist historican Jebran Chamieh writes that Muhammad

"exercised the executive power but did not form a government; he was the administrator but did not establish an administrative system; he was the supreme judge but did not create a judicial system or procedure; he was the military commander but did not organize an army; and he controlled the finances and revenues but did not have a budget. Moreover, the Prophet had ample time before his death to organize the Moslem community politically. The most pressing measure was to establish a system for the legal transmission of power. He was aware of the rivalry among his followers over the succession and could have delegated his authority to prevent dissensions among them. But he did not. These observations lend credence to those who argue that the Prophet never intended to form a state and that his mission was purely religious."

Chamieh also points out that this practice (or lack thereof) was followed by the Rashidun caliphate. They never established a police force to enforce their law, so that there was no security force to defend the head of state (Caliph Othman) when rebels attacked and killed him in his house. "The caliphs did not establish an administration, a fiscal system, or a budget ... In the conquered lands, they retained the previous Byzantine and Persian administrative systems and kept the local employees to administer the country."

=== Apologetics ===
- Apologetic writing linked aspects of the Islamic tradition with Western ideas and practices, and claimed Western practices in question were originally derived from Islam. Islamic apologetics has been severely criticized by many scholars as superficial, tendentious and even psychologically destructive, so much so that the term "apologetics" has almost become a term of abuse in the literature on modern Islam. (Note: Smith's criticism of Farid Wajdi in Islam in Modern History and Gibb's complaint about "the intellectual confusions and the paralyzing romanticism which cloud the minds of the modernists of today")

== History of Modernism ==
=== Origins ===
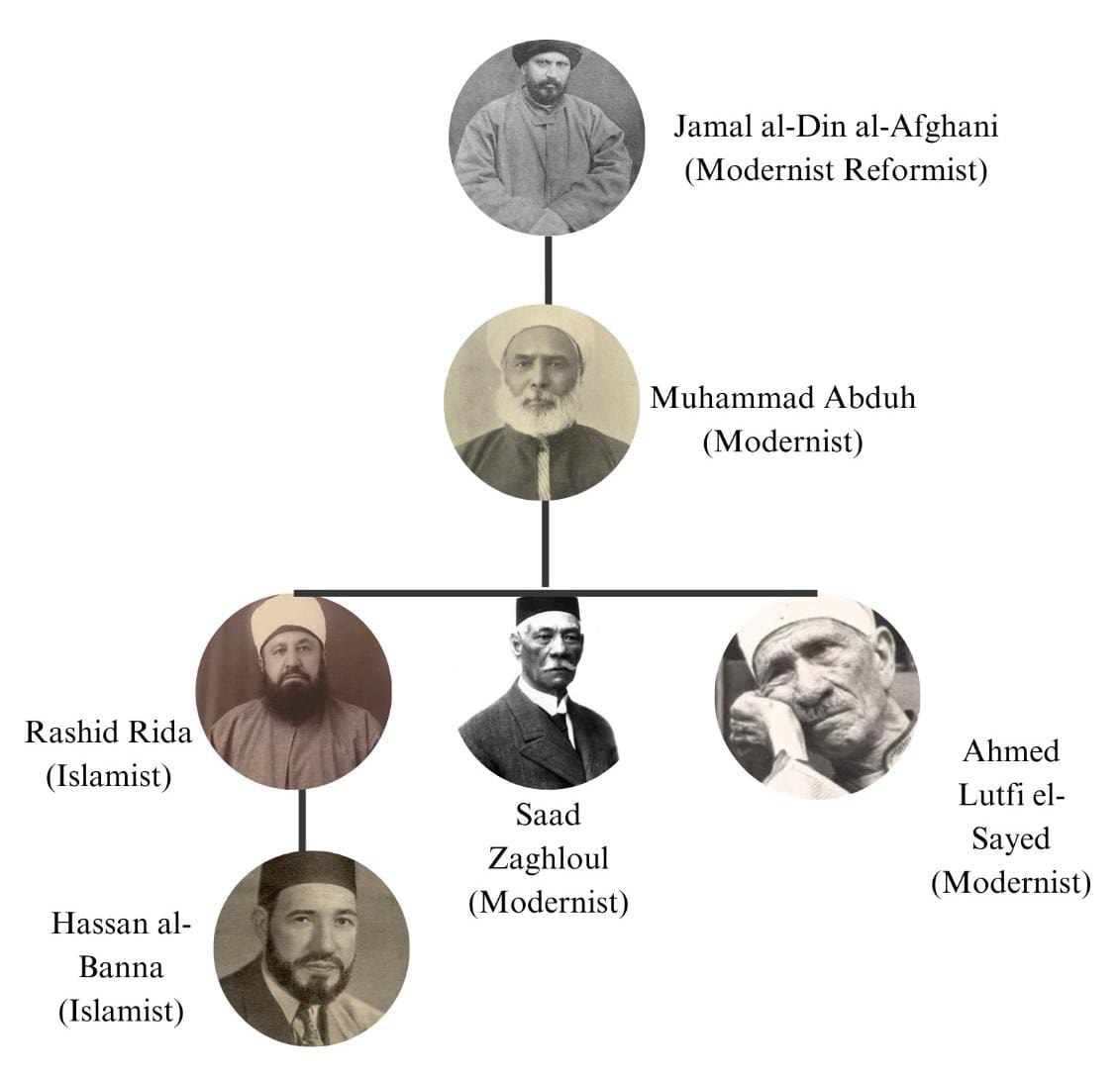
Islamic Modernism and Fundamentalism Genealogy

According to Henri Lauzière, during the second half of the 19th century numerous Muslim reformers began efforts to reconcile Islamic values with the social and intellectual ideas of the Age of Enlightenment by purging (what they believed to be) alterations from Islam and adhering to the basic tenets of Islam held during the Rashidun era. Their movement is regarded as the precursor to Islamic Modernism. According to Voll, when faced with new ideas or conflicts with their faith Muslims operated in three different ways: adaptation, conservation, and literalism. Similarly, when juxtaposed with the modern European notion of reformation, which primarily entails the alignment of conventional doctrines with Protestant and Enlightenment principles, it led to the emergence of two contrasting and symbiotic camps within the Muslim sphere: adaptionist modernists and literal fundamentalists. Modernists, in their divergence from traditionalist reformers, denied their work or objectives were in any way a “reform" of Islam. Conversely, fundamentalists, driven by their Eurocentric convictions, perceive any semblance of reform as bidah, forbidden innovation, and inherently against Islam.

Mansoor Moaddel argues that modernism tended to develop in an environment where "pluralism" prevailed and rulers stayed out of religious and ideological debates and disputes. In contrast, Islamic fundamentalism thrived in "bureaucratic authoritarian" states where rulers controlled the means of cultural production, (even though they may have opposed fundamentalism).

==== Ottoman Tanzimat ====
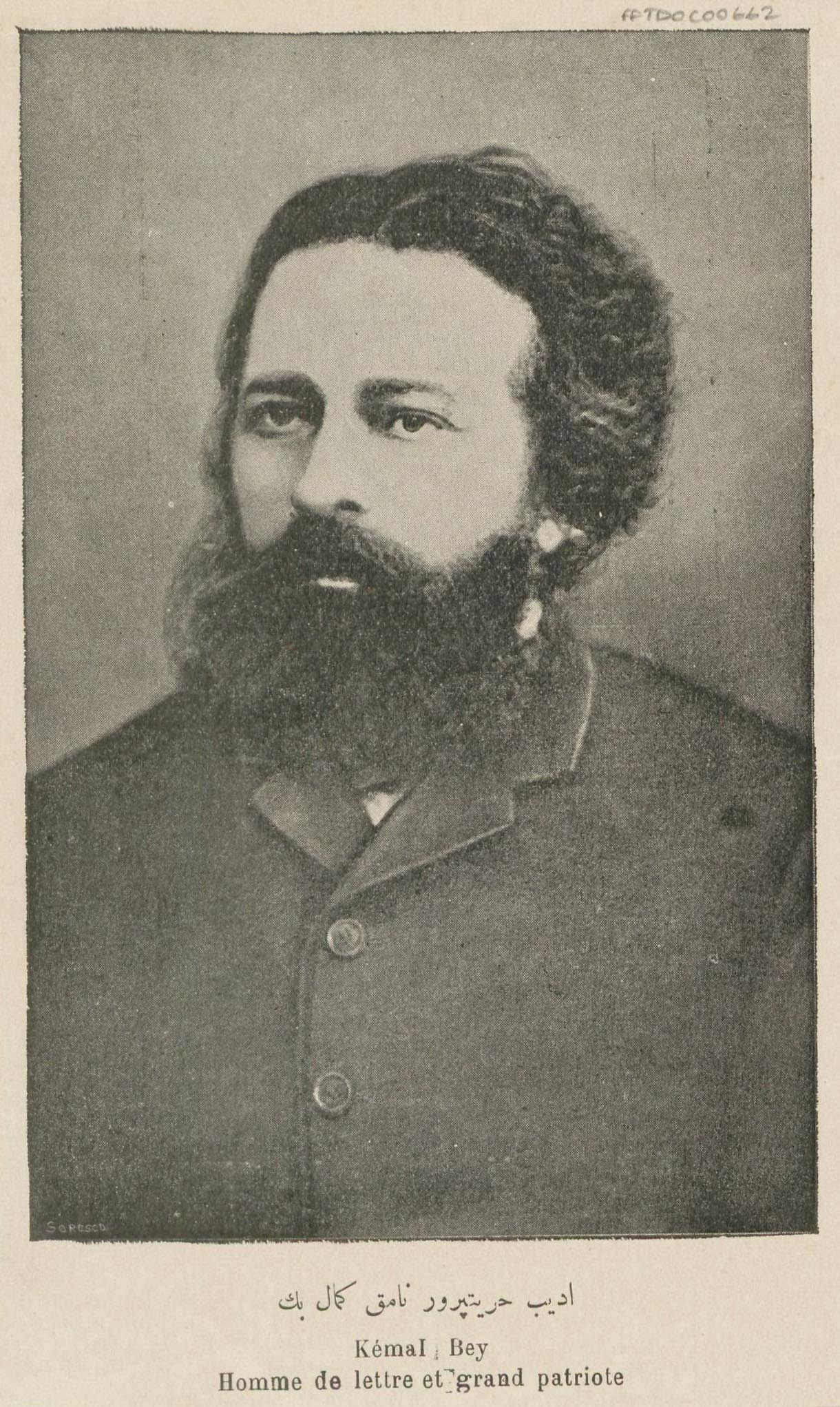
Ottoman intellectual and activist Namık Kemal (d. 1888)

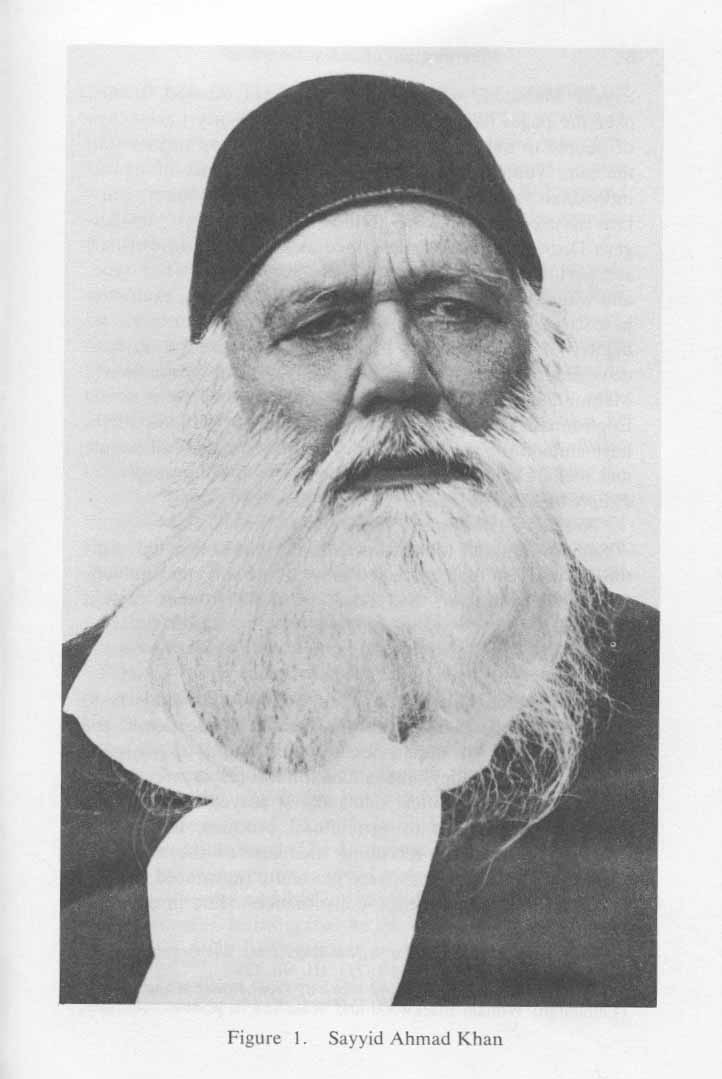
Indian educationist and philosopher Syed Ahmad Khan (1817–1898)

Islamic modernist discourse emerged as an intellectual movement in the second quarter of nineteenth century; during an era of wide-ranging reforms initiated across the Ottoman Empire known as the Tanzimat (1839–1876 C.E). The movement sought to harmonise classical Islamic theological concepts with liberal constitutional ideas and advocated the reformulation of religious values in light of drastic social, political and technological changes. Intellectuals like Namık Kemal (1840–1888 C.E.) called for popular sovereignty and "natural rights" of citizens. Major scholarly figures of this movement included the Grand Imam of al-Azhar Hassan al-Attar (d. 1835), Ottoman Vizier Mehmed Emin Âli Pasha (d. 1871), South Asian philosopher Sayyid Ahmad Khan (d. 1898), and Jamal al-Din Afghani (d. 1897). Inspired by their understanding of classical Islamic thought, these rationalist scholars regarded Islam as a religion compatible with Western philosophy and modern science.

At least one branch of Islamic Modernism began as an intellectual movement during the Tanzimat era and was part of the Ottoman constitutional movement and newly emerging patriotic trends of Ottomanism during the mid-19th century. It advocated for novel redefinitions of Ottoman imperial structure, bureaucratic reforms, implementing liberal constitution, centralisation, parliamentary system and was supportive of the Young Ottoman movement. Although modernist activists agreed with the conservative Ottoman clergy in emphasising the Muslim character of the empire, they also had fierce disputes with them. While the Ottoman clerical establishment called for Muslim unity through the preservation of the dynastic authority and unquestionable allegiance to the Ottoman Sultan; modernist intellectuals argued that imperial unity was better served through parliamentary reforms and enshrining equal treatment of all Ottoman subjects; Muslim and non-Muslim. The modernist elites frequently invoked religious slogans to gain support for cultural and educational efforts as well as their political efforts to unite the Ottoman empire under a secular constitutional order.

On the other hand, Salafiyya movement emerged as an independent revivalist trend in Syria amongst the scholarly circles of scripture-oriented Damascene ulema during the 1890s. Although Salafis shared many of the socio-political grievances of the modernist activists, they held different objectives from both the modernist and the wider constitutionalist movements. While the Salafis opposed the autocratic policies of the Sultan Abdul Hamid II and the Ottoman clergy; they also intensely denounced the secularising and centralising tendencies of Tanzimat reforms brought forth by the Constitutionalist activists, accusing them of emulating Europeans.

=== Spread ===
Eventually the modernist intellectuals formed a secret society known as Ittıfak-ı Hamiyet (Patriotic Alliance) in 1865; which advocated political liberalism and modern constitutionalist ideals of popular sovereignty through religious discourse. During this era, numerous intellectuals and social activists like Muhammad Iqbal (1877–1938 C.E.) and Egyptian Nahda figure Rifa'a al-Tahtawi (1801–1873). introduced Western ideological themes and ethical notions into local Muslim communities and religious seminaries.

==== India ====
Away from the Ottoman Empire in British India Syed Ahmad Khan (1817–1898) was "the first of the modernist thinkers to have a substantial impact upon the Muslim world at large. He founded the Muhammadan Anglo-Oriental College at Aligarh with the intent of producing "an educated elite of Muslims able to compete successfully with Hindus for jobs in the Indian administration". The college provided both training in the "European arts and sciences" and "traditional Islamic studies". He sought to "reconcile the contradictions between Islam as traditionally understood and the modern sciences he so much admired."

==== Iran ====
In Iran, Islamic modernism developed as a strand of religious reformist thought in the late 19th and early 20th centuries through attempts to reconcile Islamic principles with constitutional government. In the late 19th century, Yousuf Khan Mostashar al-Dowleh drew on the Qur'an and Hadith to argue for the compatibility of Islam with equality, liberty, and important provisions of the French constitution. During the Constitutional Revolution of 1905–1911, Islamic modernist and reformist figures observed the compatibility of Islam with constitutionalism, with Muhammad Hussain Naini and Muhammad Kazim Khurasani supporting political innovations including representative government, elections, and parliament. In the 20th century, Iranian Islamic reformism was further developed by figures such as Mehdi Bazargan, Ali Shariati, Morteza Motahhari, and Mahmoud Taleghani, who pursued new interpretations of Islam in response to modern political and social conditions.

==== Egypt ====
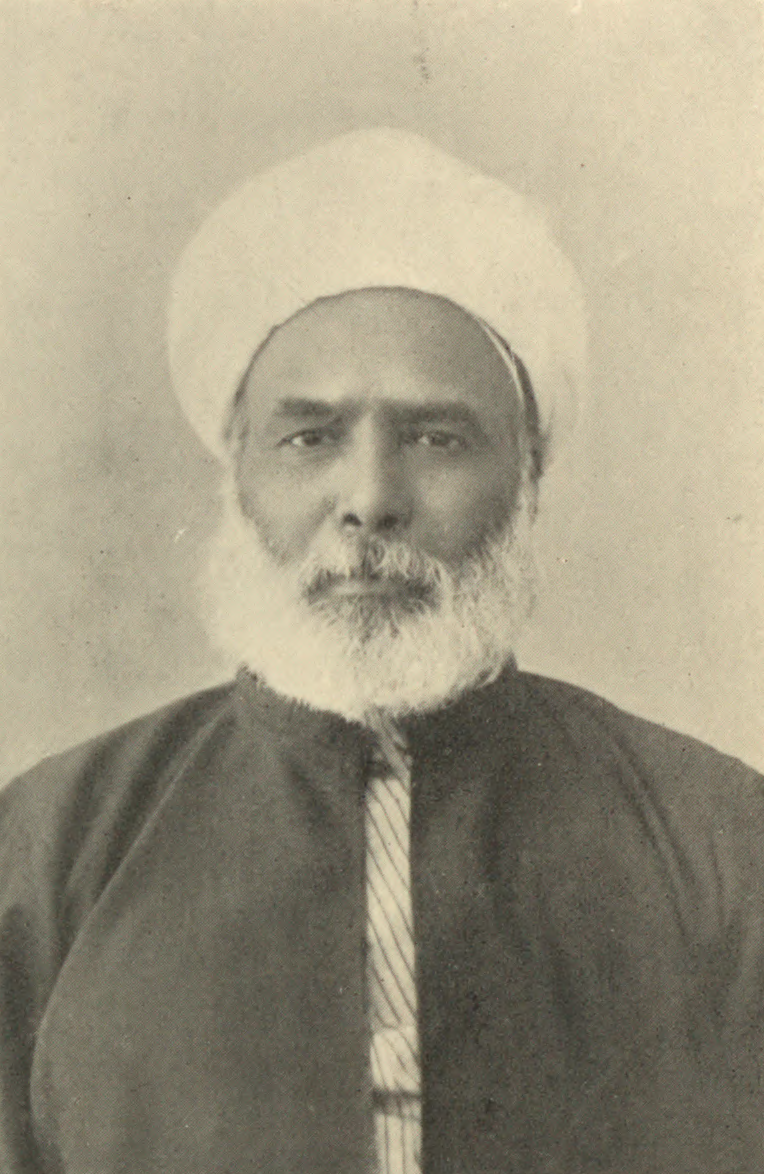
Muhammad Abduh, Grand Mufti of Egypt's Dar al-Ifta government body during 1899–1905 C.E

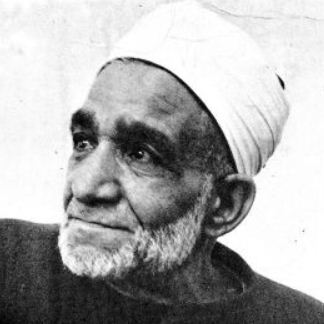
Egyptian Islamic jurist and scholar Mahmud Shaltut

The theological views of the Azharite scholar Muhammad 'Abduh (d. 1905) were greatly shaped by the 19th century Ottoman intellectual discourse. Similar to the early Ottoman modernists, Abduh tried to bridge the gap between Enlightenment ideals and traditional religious values. He believed that classical Islamic theology was intellectually vigorous and portrayed Kalam (speculative theology) as a logical methodology that demonstrated the rational spirit and vitality of Islam. Key themes of modernists would eventually be adopted by the Ottoman clerical elite who underpinned liberty as a basic Islamic principle. Portraying Islam as a religion that exemplified national development, human societal progress and evolution; Ottoman Shaykh al-Islam Musa Kazim Efendi (d. 1920) wrote in his article "Islam and Progress" published in 1904 that "the religion of Islam is not an obstacle to progress. On the contrary, it is that which commands and encourages progress; it is the very reason for progress itself."

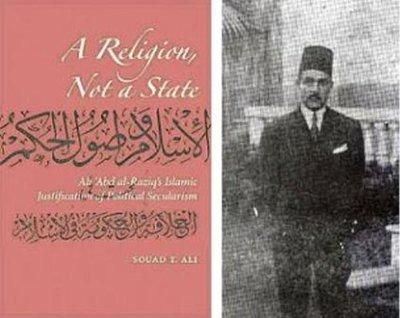
Azharite philosopher 'Ali Abd al-Raziq (1888–1966 C.E), an early modernist intellectual who theorized secular Islam

Commencing in the late nineteenth century and impacting the twentieth-century, Muhammed Abduh and his followers undertook an educational and social project to defend, modernize and revitalize Islam to match Western institutions and social processes. Its most prominent intellectual founder, Muhammad Abduh (d. 1323 AH/1905 CE), was Sheikh of Al-Azhar University for a brief period before his death. This project superimposed the world of the nineteenth century on the extensive body of Islamic knowledge that had accumulated in a different milieu.

These efforts had little impact at first. After Abduh's death, his movement was catalysed by the demise of the Ottoman Caliphate in 1924 and promotion of secular liberalism – particularly with a new breed of writers being pushed to the fore including Egyptian Ali Abd al-Raziq's publication attacking Islamic politics for the first time in Muslim history. Subsequent secular writers of this trend including Farag Foda, al-Ashmawi, Muhamed Khalafallah, Taha Husayn, Husayn Amin, et al., have argued in similar tones.

Abduh was skeptical towards many Ahadith (or "Traditions"). Particularly towards those Traditions that are reported through few chains of transmission, even if they are deemed rigorously authenticated in any of the six canonical books of Hadith (known as the Kutub al-Sittah). Furthermore, he advocated a reassessment of traditional assumptions even in Hadith studies, though he did not devise a systematic methodology before his death.

==== Ibn Ashur's Maqasid al-Sharia ====
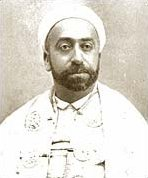
Tunisian scholar Muhammad al-Tahir ibn Ashur.

Tunisian Maliki scholar Muhammad al-Tahir ibn Ashur (1879–1973 C.E) who rose to the position of chief judge at Zaytuna University was a major student of Muhammad 'Abduh. He met 'Abduh in 1903 during his visit to Tunisia and thereafter became a passionate advocate of 'Abduh's modernist vision. He called for a revamping of the educational curriculum and became noteworthy for his role in revitalising the discourse of Maqasid al-Sharia (Higher Objectives of Islamic Law) in scholarly and intellectual ciricles. Ibn Ashur authored the book Maqasid al-Shari'ah al-Islamiyyah in 1946 which was widely accepted by modernist intellectuals and writers. In his treatise, Ibn Ashur called for a legal theory that is flexible towards 'urf (local customs) and adopted contextualised approach towards re-interpretation of hadiths based on applying the principle of Maqasid (objectives).

== Decline ==
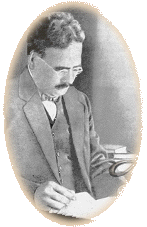
Lawyer and Islamic poet Muhammad Iqbal (d. 1938) called for a "reconstruction" of Islamic thought.

After its peak during the early 20th century, the modernist movement would gradually decline after the Dissolution of the Ottoman Empire in the 1920s and eventually lost ground to conservative reform movements such as Salafism. Following the First World War, Western colonialism of Muslim lands and the advancement of secularist trends; Islamic reformers felt betrayed by the Arab nationalists and underwent a crisis.

=== Islamism ===
This schism was epitomised by the ideological transformation of Sayyid Rashid Rida, a pupil of 'Abduh, who began to resuscitate the treatises of Hanbali theologian Ibn Taymiyyah and became the "forerunner of Islamist thought" by popularising his ideals. His impulse reached its peak in the aftermath of World War I, when he published al-Khilafa aw al-Imama al-'Uzma (The Caliphate or the Supreme Imamate) in 1923, proposing comprehensive pan-Islamism, calling upon Muslims to gather under their shared faith and shun emerging nationalist movements. Rida also stressed the importance of Arab leadership in unifying Muslim ranks.

Unlike 'Abduh and Afghani, Rida and his disciples susbcribed to the Hanbali theology. They would openly campaign against adherents of other schools, like the Shi'ites, who they considered deviant. Rida transformed the Reformation into a puritanical movement that advanced Muslim identitarianism, pan-Islamism and preached the superiority of Islamic culture while attacking Westernisation. One of the major hallmarks of Rida's movement was his advocacy of a theological doctrine that obligated the establishment of an Islamic state led by the Ulema (Islamic scholars).

Rida's fundamentalist/Islamist doctrines would later be adopted by Islamic scholars and Islamist movements like the Muslim Brotherhood. According to the German scholar Bassam Tibi, "Rida's Islamic fundamentalism has been taken up by the Muslim Brethren, a right wing radical movement founded in 1928, which has ever since been in inexorable opposition to secular nationalism."

=== Contemporary Era ===
Contemporary Muslim modernism is characterised by its emphasis on the doctrine of Maqasid al-sharia to navigate the currents of modernity and address issues related to international human rights. Another aspect is its promotion of Fiqh al-Aqalliyat (minority jurisprudence) during the late 20th century to answer the challenges facing the growing Muslim minority populations in the West. Islamic scholar Abdullah Bin Bayyah, professor of Islamic studies at King Abdul Aziz University in Jiddah, is one of the major proponents of Fiqh al-Aqalliyat and advocates remodelling the legal system based on the principles of Maqasid al-Sharia to suit the sensitivities of the modern era.

== Influence on Revivalist movements ==
=== Salafiyya movement ===
==== Origins ====
The modernist movement led by Jamal Al-Din al-Afghani, Muhammad 'Abduh, Muhammad al-Tahir ibn Ashur, Syed Ahmad Khan, and to a lesser extent Mohammed al-Ghazali; shared some of the ideals of the conservative revivalist Wahhabi movement, such as endeavoring to "return" to the Islamic understanding of the first Muslim generations (Salaf) by reopening the doors of juristic deduction (ijtihad) that they saw as closed.

The connection between modernists and Salafists is disputed, with various academics asserting there never really was one. There are those scholars maintain that they used to share the "salafi" designation, but nothing else (Oxford Bibliographies, Quintan Wiktorowicz); or that modernists "al-Afghani and Abduh were hardly Salafis to begin with" (Henri Lauziere); (Note: Lauziere is associate professor of Middle Eastern history at Northwestern University.) or contrary to that, call Al-Afghani, Abduh, and Rida founders of Salafiyya and go on to describe their creation without ever mentioning modernism (Olivier Roy). Those that believe they did have the same ancestors (a view propagated in early 20th century by French Orientalist Louis Massignon), do not always agree on what happened: Salafists starting out on the side of "enlightenment and modernity" and "inexplicably" turned against these virtues and to puritanism (World News Research); or the term "Salafist" was coined by Rashid Rida, a student of Abduh, who later distanced himself from Abduh's teachings in favor of puritanism but was appropriated by one Muhammad Nasiruddin al-Albani, so that the world now associates it with al-Albani and his disciples but not with Rida his movement (Ammaar Yasir Qadhi); or that it was Muhammad ʿAbduh and Rida who established "enlightened Salafiyya" (modernism) and it was Rashid Rida (no mention of al-Albani) who incrementally transformed it into the Wahhabi-friendly Salafiyya we know today (Raihan Ismail). In any case, it is generally agreed that in the early 21st century, conservative Salafi Muslims see their movement as understanding "the injunctions of the sacred texts in their most literal traditional sense", looking up to Ibn Taymiyya rather than 19th century Reformers.

Olivier Roy describes the characteristics of the 19th-century movement of the likes of Al-Afghani and Abduh as rejection of cultural themes (adat, urf), rejection of maraboutism (belief in the powers of intervention of those blessed with divine charisma, or barakah), and opposition to rapprochement with other religions. These were standard fundamentalist reformist doctrines. Where Salafists were different was in their rejection of the tradition of the ulama (Islamic clergy), the ulama's "body of additions and extensions" to the Sunnah and Quran: the tafsir commentary on the Quran, the four legal schools of madhahib, philosophy, culture, etc. Salafiyya were traditional in their politics or lack thereof, and unlike later Islamists "made no wholesale condemnations of existing Muslim governments". Issues of governance they were interested in were application of sharia and the reconstitution of the ummah (Muslim community), and particularly with the restoration of the caliphate. Yasir Qadhi argues that modernism only influenced Salafism. According to Quintan Wiktorowicz:

There has been some confusion in recent years because both the Islamic modernists and the contemporary Salafis refer (referred) to themselves as al-salafiyya, leading some observers to erroneously conclude a common ideological lineage. The earlier salafiyya (modernists), however, were predominantly rationalist Asharis.

Similarly, Oxford Bibliographies distinguishes between the early Islamic modernists, such as Muhammad Abdu who used the term "Salafiyya", for example to refer to their attempt at renovation of Islamic thought, and the very different, more purist, and traditional Salafiyya of movements, such as Ahl-i Hadith and Wahhabism, among others. (Note: "Salafism is, therefore, a modern phenomenon, being the desire of contemporary Muslims to rediscover what they see as the pure, original and authentic Islam, ... However, there is a difference between two profoundly different trends which sought inspiration from the concept of salafiyya. Indeed, between the end of the 19th century and the beginning of 20th century, intellectuals such as Jamal Edin al-Afghani and Muhammad Abdu used salafiyya to mean a renovation of Islamic thought, with features that would today be described as rationalist, modernist and even progressive. This salafiyya movement is often known in the West as "Islamic modernism." However, the term salafism is today generally employed to signify ideologies such as Wahhabism, the puritanical ideology of the Kingdom of Saudi Arabia.") Both groups wanted to strip away taqlid (imitation) of post-Salaf doctrine they thought not truly Islamic, but for different reasons. Modernists thought taqlid prevented the Muslims from flourishing because it got in the way of compatibility with the modern world, traditional revivalists simply because (they believed) it was impure. What was needed was not reinterpretation but a religious revival of pure Islam. Muhammad 'Abduh and his movement have sometimes been referred to as "Neo-Mu'tazilites" because his ideas are congruent to the Mu'tazila school of theology. Abduh himself denied being either Ash'ari or a Mu'tazilite, although only because he rejected strict taqlid (conformity) to any one group. After World War I, some Western scholars, such as Louis Massignon categorising many scripture-oriented rationalist scholars and modernists as part of the paradigm of "Salafiyya"; other scholars dispute this description.

==== Revivalism ====
The rise of pan-Islamism across the Muslim World after the First World War and the collapse of the Ottoman Empire, would herald the emergence of Salafi religious purism that fervently opposed modernist trends. The anti-colonial struggle to restore the Khilafah would become the top priority; manifesting in the formation of the Muslim Brotherhood, a revolutionary movement established in 1928 by the Egyptian school teacher Hassan al-Banna. Backed by the Wahhabi clerical elites of Saudi Arabia, Salafis who advocated pan-Islamist religious conservatism emerged across the Muslim World, gradually replacing modernists during the decolonisation period, and then dominating funding for Islam via petroleum export money starting in the 1970s. According to Abu Ammaar Yasir Qadhi:

Rashid Rida popularized the term 'Salafī' to describe a particular movement that he spearheaded. That movement sought to reject the ossification of the madhhabs, and rethink through the standard issues of fiqh and modernity, at times in very liberal ways. A young scholar by the name of Muhammad Nasiruddin al-Albani read an article by Rida, and then took this term and used it to describe another, completely different movement. Ironically, the movement that Rida spearheaded eventually became Modernist Islam and dropped the 'Salafī' label, and the legal methodology that al-Albānī championed – with a very minimal overlap with Rida's vision of Islam – retained the appellation 'Salafī'. Eventually, al-Albānī's label was adopted by the Najdī daʿwah as well, until it spread in all trends of the movement. Otherwise, before this century, the term 'Salafī' was not used as a common label and proper noun. Therefore, the term 'Salafī' has attached itself to an age-old school of theology, the Atharī school.

Islamic revivalists, such as Mahmud Shukri Al-Alusi (1856–1924 C.E), Muhammad Rashid Rida (1865–1935 C.E), and Jamal al-Din al-Qasimi (1866–1914 C.E), used Salafiyya as a term primarily to denote the traditionalist Sunni theology, Atharism. Rida also regarded the Wahhabi movement as part of the Salafiyya trend. Apart from the Wahhabis of Najd, Athari theology could also be traced back to the Alusi family in Iraq, Ahl-i Hadith in India, and scholars such as Rashid Rida in Egypt. After 1905, Rida steered his reformist programme towards the path of fundamentalist counter-reformation. This tendency led by Rida emphasized following the salaf al-salih and became known as the Salafiyya movement, which advocated a re-generation of pristine religious teachings of the early Muslim community. According to Dallal's interpretation, for Rida, revival and reform were not a function of the quality of the thought of the reformer, nor the extent of reception of the reformer's ideas; rather, a reformer's sphere of influence might be any "large or small locality," and the criterion for judging his views is solely the extent to which these ideas are needed at a particular point in time. He links it to Ibn 'Abd al-Wahhab being offered stands on the same footing (and in the same paragraph) with that of Shawkani in Rida's list of revivers. This outlook diminishes the significance of a reformer's ideas having universal value beyond their local origins. Furthermore, the intellectual merit of these ideas becomes of secondary importance in Rida's framework.

The progressive views of the early modernists Afghani and Abduh were soon replaced by the puritan Athari tradition espoused by their students; which zealously denounced the ideas of non-Muslims and secular ideologies like liberalism. This theological transformation was led by Syed Rashid Rida who adopted the strict Athari creedal doctrines of Ibn Taymiyyah during the early twentieth century. The Salafiyya movement popularised by Rida would advocate for an Athari-Wahhabi theology. Their promotion of Ijtihad was based on referring back to a strictly textual methodology. Its traditionalist vision was adopted by the Wahhabi clerical establishment and championed by influential figures such as the Syrian-Albanian Hadith scholar Muhammad Nasiruddin al-Albani (d. 1999 C.E/ 1420 A.H).

As a scholarly movement, "Enlightened Salafism" had begun declining some time after the death of Muhammad ʿAbduh in 1905. The puritanical stances of Rashid Rida, accelerated by his support to the Wahhabi movement; transformed Salafiyya movement incrementally and became commonly regarded as "traditional Salafism". The divisions between "Enlightened Salafis" inspired by ʿAbduh, and traditional Salafis represented by Rashid Rida and his disciples would eventually exacerbate. Gradually, the modernist Salafis became totally disassociated from the "Salafi" label in popular discourse and would identify as tanwiris (enlightened) or Islamic modernists. This is how Rida including his lineage of teachers, Abduh and Afghani, pioneered a Protestant styled reform in the late 19th and early 20th century Muslim world as Afghani always aspired for. They recognized the challenges posed by imperialism but sought integration into the modern European era. They redefined Islamic values and institutions to adapt to the changing times while emphasizing historical precedents to legitimize European institutions with an Islamic touch.

=== Muslim Brotherhood ===
Islamist movements like Muslim Brotherhood (al-Ikhwān al-Muslimūn) were highly influenced by both Islamic Modernism and Salafism. Its founder Hassan Al-Banna was influenced by Muhammad Abduh and particularly his Salafi student Rashid Rida. Al-Banna attacked the taqlid of the official ulama and insisted only the Qur'an and the best-attested ahadith should be sources of the Sharia. He was a dedicated reader of the writings of Rashid Rida and the magazine that Rida published, Al-Manar. Sharing Rida's central concern with the decline of Islamic civilization, Al-Banna too believed that this trend could be reversed only by returning to a pure, unadulterated form of Islam. Like Rida, (and unlike the Islamic modernists) Al-Banna viewed Western secular ideas as the main danger to Islam in the modern age. The Brotherhood moved gradually in a traditionalist and conservative direction as Islamic Modernist beliefs were co-opted by secularist rulers and official `ulama, and as the group became "the only available outlet" for pious Muslims "whose religious and cultural sensibilities" were outraged by "the impact of Westernisation". The Brotherhood argued for a Salafist solution to the contemporary challenges faced by the Muslims, advocating the establishment of an Islamic state through implementation of the Shari'ah, based on Salafi revivalism.

Although the Muslim Brotherhood officially describes itself as a Salafi movement, the Quietist Salafis often contest its Salafist credentials. The Brotherhood differs from more purist salafis in their strategy for combating the challenge of modernity, and is focused on gaining control of the government. Despite this, both the Brotherhood and more thorough-going Salafists advocate the implementation of sharia and emphasizes strict doctrinal adherence to the Quran and Sunnah and the Salaf al-Salih. The Salafi-Activists who have a long tradition of political involvement; are highly active in Islamist movements like the Muslim Brotherhood and its various branches and affiliates. Some Brotherhood's slogans and principles expressed by former Egyptian president Mohammed Morsi includes "the Koran is our constitution, the Prophet Muhammad, peace and blessings upon him, is our leader, jihad is our path, and death for the sake of Allah is our most lofty aspiration ... sharia, sharia, and then finally sharia. This nation will enjoy blessing and revival only through the Islamic sharia."

== Islamic modernists ==
Although not all of the figures named below are from the above-mentioned movement, they all share a more or less modernist thought or/and approach.

- Muhammad Abduh (Egypt)
- Jamal al-Din al-Afghani (Afghanistan or Persia/Iran)
- Muhammad al-Tahir ibn Ashur (Tunisia)
- Chiragh Ali (British India)
- Syed Ameer Ali (British India)
- Qasim Amin (Egypt)
- Mustafa Kemal Atatürk (Turkey)
- Malek Bennabi (Algeria)
- Musa Jarullah Bigeev (Russia)
- Ahmad Dahlan (Indonesia)
- Farag Fawda (neomodernist) (Egypt)
- Abdulrauf Fitrat (Uzbekistan, then Russia)
- Muhammad Iqbal (British India)
- Wang Jingzhai (China)
- Muhammad Ahmad Khalafallah (Egypt)
- Syed Ahmad Khan (British India)
- Shibli Nomani (British India)
- Ğäbdennasír İbrahim ulı Qursawí (Russia)
- Mahmoud Shaltout (Egypt)
- Ali Shariati (Iran)
- Mahmoud Mohammed Taha (neomodernist) (Sudan)
- Rifa'a al-Tahtawi (Egypt)
- Mahmud Tarzi (Afghanistan)

=== Contemporary Modernists ===
- Mohammed Arkoun (Algeria)
- Khaled Abou El Fadl (United States)
- Gamal al-Banna (Egypt)
- Soheib Bencheikh (France)
- Abdennour Bidar (France)
- Taha Hussein (Egypt)
- Wahiduddin Khan (India)
- Irshad Manji (Canada)
- Abdelwahab Meddeb (France)
- Mahmoud Mohammed Taha (Sudan)
- Ebrahim Moosa (South Africa)
- Tariq Ramadan (Switzerland)
- Muhammad Tahir-ul-Qadri (Pakistan)
- Amina Wadud (United States)
- Mehdi Bazargan (Iran)

== Contemporary use ==
=== Turkey ===
The logo of 'Diyanet', the directorate of religious affairs in Turkey

In 2008, the state directorate of religious affairs (Diyanet) for the Republic of Turkey launched the review of all the Ahadith. The school of theology at Ankara University undertook this forensic examination with the aim of removing the centuries-old conservative cultural burden and rediscovering the spirit of reason in the original message of Islam. Fadi Hakura of Chatham House in London compared these revisions to the 16th century Protestant Reformation of Christianity. Turkey has also trained women as theologians, and sent them as senior Imams known as 'vaizes' all over the country, to explain these re-interpretations.

=== Pakistan ===
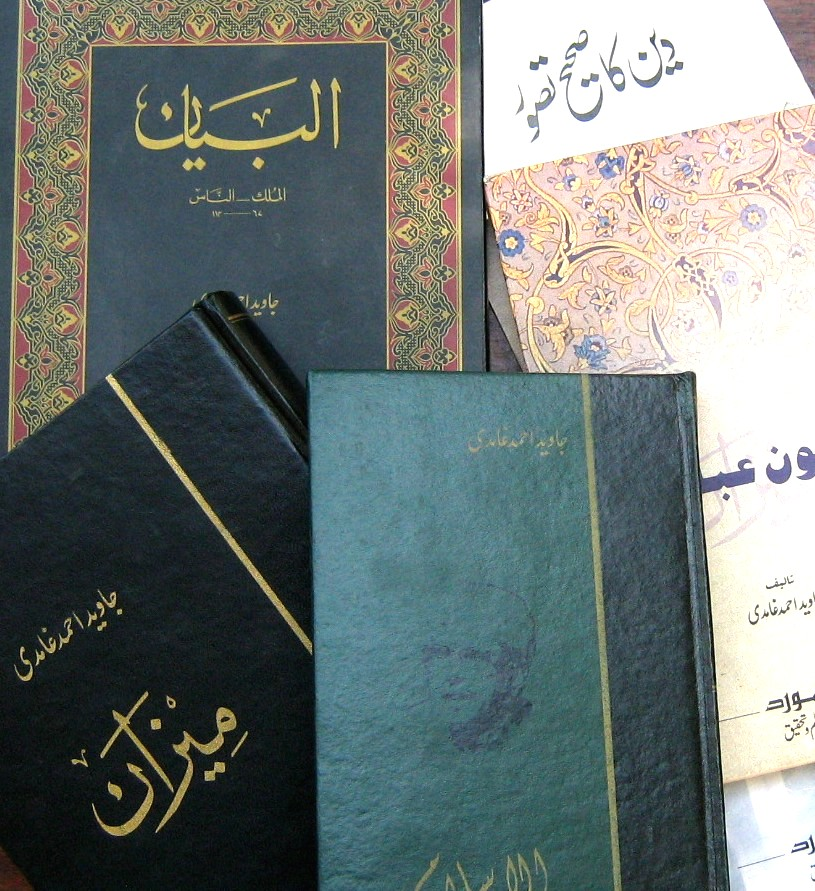
The works of the Pakistani modernist Islamic scholar Javed Ahmed Ghamidi, who belongs to Farahi school of thought

According to Charles Kennedy, in Pakistan as of 1992 the range of views on the "appropriate role of Islam" runs from "Islamic Modernists" at one end of the spectrum to "Islamic activists" at the other. "Islamic activists" support the expansion of "Islamic law and Islamic practices", "Islamic Modernists" are unenthusiastic to this expansion and "some may even advocate development along the secularist lines of the West".

=== Muhammadiyah ===
The Indonesian Islamic organization Muhammadiyah was founded in 1912. Often described as Salafist, and sometimes as Islamic modernist, it emphasized the authority of the Qur'an and the Hadiths, opposing syncretism and taqlid (blind-conformity) to the ulema. As of 2006, it is said to have "veered sharply toward a more conservative brand of Islam" under the leadership of Din Syamsuddin, the head of the Indonesian Ulema Council.

== Criticism ==
Because of its association with Westernization and Western education, as modernism arose in the late 19th century (in areas such as India and under leaders such as Syed Ahmad Khan), it was opposed vigorously as bid'ah and "the most dangerous heresy of the day" by Muslim scholars (ulama), (although some orthodox/traditionalist Muslims, particularly Sunni Salafis, also sought to return to the purity of the Qur'an and the Sunnah and to give the Ijma/consensus of the salaf, precedence over allegedly "later religious interpretations").

One of the leading Islamist thinkers and Islamic revivalists, Abul A'la Maududi agreed with Islamic modernists that Islam contained nothing contrary to reason, and was superior in rational terms to all other religious systems. However, he disagreed with them in their examination of the Quran and the Sunna using reason as the standard. Maududi, instead started from the proposition that "true reason is Islamic", and accepted the Book and the Sunna, not reason, as the final authority. Modernists erred in examining rather than simply obeying the Quran and the Sunna. (Note: "He agreed with them [Islamic Modernists] in holding that Islam required the exercise of reason by the community to understand God's decrees, in believing, therefore, that Islam contains nothing contrary to reason, and in being convinced that Islam as revealed in the Book and the Sunna is superior in purely rational terms to all other systems. But he thought they had gone wrong in allowing themselves to judge the Book and the Sunna by the standard of reason. They had busied themselves trying to demonstrate that "Islam is truly reasonable" instead of starting, as he did, from the proposition that "true reason is Islamic". Therefore they were not sincerely accepting the Book and the Sunna as the final authority, because implicitly they were setting up human reason as a higher authority (the old error of the Mu'tazilites). In Maududi's view, once one has become a Muslim, reason no longer has any function of judgement. From then on its legitimate task is simply to spell out the implications of Islam's clear commands, the rationality of which requires no demonstration.")

Scholar Malise Ruthven argues that the belief "integral" to at least one prominent modernist, Muhammad Abduh—namely that the basic revealed truths of Islam and the observable, rational truths of science must "in the final analysis be identical"—is problematic. She claims this notion is "based on the essentially medieval premise that science, like scripture itself is a finite body of knowledge awaiting revelation", when in fact science is "a dynamic process of discovery subject to continual revision". The establishment of non-religious institutions of learning in India, Egypt and elsewhere, which Abduh encouraged, "opened the floodgates to secular forces which threatened Islam's intellectual foundations".

Advocates of political Islam argue that, insofar as Modernism seeks to separate Islam and politics, it is adopting the Christian and secular principle of "Render unto Caesar what is Caesar's" despite politics being inherent to Islam, which encompasses every aspect of life. Some, (Hizb ut-Tahrir for example), claim that in Muslim political jurisprudence, philosophy and practice, the Caliphate is the correct Islamic form of government, and that it has "a clear structure comprising a Caliph, assistants (mu'awinoon), governors (wulaat), judges (qudaat) and administrators (mudeeroon)."

== See also ==
- Islam and modernity
- Islamic revival
- Islamism
- Liberalism and progressivism within Islam
- Contemporary Islamic philosophy
- Muslim Reform Movement
- Reform (religion)
- Tafazzul Husain Kashmiri

== Bibliography ==
- Amin, Qasim (2002). "The Emancipation of Woman and The New Woman". In Kurzman, Charles (ed.). Modernist Islam, 1840–1940: A Sourcebook. New York: Oxford University Press. pp. 61–69. ISBN 978-0-19-515468-9.
- DeLong-Bas, Natana J. (2004). Wahhabi Islam: From Revival and Reform to Global Jihad. New York: Oxford University Press. ISBN 0-19-516991-3.
- Hughes, Aaron W. (2013). "Encounters with Modernity". Muslim Identities: An Introduction to Islam. New York: Columbia University Press. pp. 225–253. ISBN 978-0-231-53192-4.
- Kennedy, Charles (1996). Islamization of Laws and Economy, Case Studies on Pakistan. Institute of Policy Studies, The Islamic Foundation.
- Khan, Feisal (2015). Islamic Banking in Pakistan: Shariah-Compliant Finance and the Quest to Make Pakistan More Islamic. Abingdon, Oxford: Routledge. ISBN 978-0-415-77975-3.
- Masud, Muhammad Khalid (2009). "Islamic Modernism". In Masud, Muhammad Khalid; Salvatore, Armando; Van Bruinessen, Martin (eds.). Islam and Modernity: Key Issues and Debate. Edinburgh: Edinburgh University Press. pp. 237–260. ISBN 978-0-7486-3792-8.
- Peters, Rudolph (1996). Jihad in Classical and Modern Islam: A Reader. Princeton, New Jersey: Markus Wiener Publishers. ISBN 1-55876-108-X – via Internet Archive.
- Shepard, William E. (August 1987). "Islam and Ideology: Towards a Typology" (PDF). International Journal of Middle East Studies. 19 (3). Cambridge University Press: 307–335. doi:10.1017/S0020743800056750. JSTOR 163657. S2CID 92988363.
- Warde, Ibrahim (2010) [2000]. Islamic Finance in the Global Economy (Second, Revised and updated ed.). Edinburgh: Edinburgh University Press. ISBN 978-0-7486-2776-9.
- Watson, Peter (2001). The Modern Mind: An Intellectual History of the 20th Century. New York: Harper Perennial. ISBN 978-0-06-008438-7.
