= Sara Qaed =

Bahraini political cartoonist (born 1990)

- Born: 1990 (age 35–36); Bahrain
- Style: political cartoonist
- Awards: Ibn Rushd Prize for Freedom of Thought
- Website: https://www.saraqaed.com/

Sara Qaed (Arabic: سارة قائد, romanized: Sārah Qāʼid; born 1990) is a Bahraini political cartoonist. She was awarded the Ibn Rushd Prize for Freedom of Thought in 2019.

== Early life ==
Qaed was born in Bahrain in 1990. She studied interior design and fine arts at the Faculty of Arts, Sciences and Education in Bahrain.

== Career ==
Quad began publishing cartoons in 2009. Her political caricatures focus on the oppression of women, refugees, religious violence, corruption, power and war. In 2010, she worked as a cartoonist for a local weekly newspaper and also worked illustrating children's stories for Anas Magazine. Between 2012 and 2014 she taught art at the School of International Dialogue.

Qaed moved to Europe and ran a work space in Berlin. She currently lives in Newcastle-upon-Tyne, England. In 2021, Qaed collaborated with the worldwide Universal Basic Income Lab Network to create a series of four illustrations for a project called Freeing Your Feet. She was also one of the artists in residence with HelixArts.

Her works have exhibited at the Bahrain National Museum; at the Al-Riwaq Gallery in Bahrain; in Gaza, Palestine; at the Stripdagen Harleem Festival in the Netherlands; and at the Arab Caricature Festival at the Cultuurhuis de Warrande in Belgium. She has been featured in the Huffington Post and in the London-based Al-Araby Al-Jadeed newspaper.

In 2023, Qaed participated in a fundraiser exhibition at Lok Virsa Museum in Islamabad, Pakistan, in support of Palestinian families.

== Awards ==
In 2019, Qaed was awarded the IIbn Rushd Prize for Freedom of Thought.
