= Aisha Abd al-Rahman =

Egyptian author, editor and literary professor

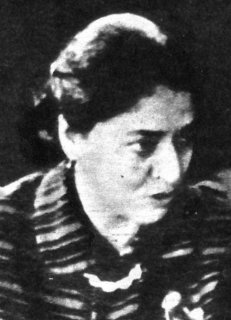
- Born: 18 November 1913; Damietta, Domyat, Khedivate of Egypt
- Died: 1 December 1998 (aged 85); Cairo, Egypt
- Writing career
- Pen name: Bint al-Shāṭi

Aisha Abd al-Rahman (Arabic: عائشة عبد الرحمن; November 18, 1913 – 1 December 1998) (ʻĀʾishah ʻAbd al-Raḥman) was an Egyptian author, editor and professor of literature who published under the pen name Bint al-Shāṭiʾ [Daughter of the Nil] (بِنْت ٱلشّاطِئ).

== Life and career ==
She was born on 18 November 1913 in Damietta in the governorate of Domyat, Egypt, where her father taught at the Domyat Religious Institute. She started her education by memorizing and reciting the Qur'an in traditional village schools. When she was ten, her mother, though illiterate, enrolled her in school while her father was traveling. Though her father objected, her mother later sent Aisha to El Mansurah for further education. In 1920, she was enrolled in the al-Luzi al-Amiriya School for Girls with the support of her mother and grandfather. Upon receiving a teaching certificate, she taught at a girls' school in Mansoura. Later, Aisha studied Arabic at Cairo University earning her undergraduate degree in 1939, and an M.A. degree in 1941.

In 1942, Aisha began work as an Inspector for teaching of Arabic literature for the Egyptian Ministry of Education. She earned her PhD with distinction in 1950 and was appointed Professor of Arabic Literature at the University College for Women of the Ain Shams University.

She wrote fiction and biographies of early Muslim women as well as literary criticism. She was the second modern woman to undertake Qur'anic exegesis. Her commentary on the Qur'an (al-Tafsīr al-Bayānī Iil-Qurʾān al-Karīm), was published in two volumes between 1966 and 1969. This work is characterized by the rejection of any sources outside the Qur'an, especially those of biblical or Jewish origin. She sees the use of these in classical commentaries as evidence of an alleged Jewish conspiracy. Furthermore, she rejects the classical assumption that each verse allows for a multitude of interpretations and even argues that every word in the Qur'an has an exact meaning that cannot be rendered by a synonym. Their tafsīr is not complete and only deals with the 14 shorter suras at the end of the Qur'an. The commentary is considered one of the most important, partly due to the method used in it, but also because it is the first commentary written by a woman. She described her philological method, which was influenced by her teacher and husband Amin al-Khuli and Muhammad Abduh, as a literary method (al-manhaj al-adabī).

She did not consider herself to be a feminist, but her works reflect the belief that female authors are more capable of analyzing the life stories of women than male authors, because men are "ignorant of female instinct".

During her lifetime, ʻĀʾishah ʻAbd al-Raḥman was recognised for her achievements, which earned her several awards. In 1987, she received the State Award from the Egyptian government. In 1994, she was the co-winner-along with Widād Al-Qāḍī- of King Faisal International Award for Arabic Literature.

She was married to Sheik Amin al-Khuli, her teacher at Cairo University during her undergraduate years. She died of a heart attack following a stroke in Cairo. She donated all her library to research purposes, and in 1985 a statue was built in her honor in Cairo.

== Selected bibliography ==
The author of "more than forty books and one hundred articles", her notable publications include:

- al Rif al-Misri ("The Egyptian Countryside") (1936)
- Qadiyat al-fallah ("The Problem of the Peasant") (1938)
- Secret of the Beach and Master of the Estate: The Story of a Sinful Woman (1942)
- Ard al-mu'jizat ("Land of Miracles") (1952)
- al-Ghufran ("Forgiveness") a critical essay (1954)
- Banat al-nabi (nisa’ al-nabi), radiya Allah ‘anhunna ("The Prophet's Daughters") (1956)
- al-Khansa ("Al-Khansa") (1957)
- Umm al-nabi, salla Allah ‘alayhi wa sallam ("The Prophet's Mother") (1961)
- New Values in Arabic Literature (1961)
- Contemporary Arab Women Poets (1963)
