= Abd al-Azim Anis =

Egyptian cultural critic and Marxist

'Abd al-'Azim 'Anis
- عبد العظيم أنيس
- Born: July 17, 1923; Cairo, Egypt
- Died: January 14, 2009 (aged 85)
- Education: Doctor of Philosophy in mathematical statistics from the University of London

'Abd al-'Azim 'Anis (Arabic: عبد العظيم انيس) was a leading Egyptian cultural critic and Marxist involved with the Communist Party of Egypt. He was detained in Egyptian prisons from the early 1960s due to his political activities. 'Anis called for "unity of all the nationalist and progressive forces including, naturally, the Arab communists."

His publications included essays and letters written in prison. He co-authored Fi al-Thaqafa al-Misriyya (On Egyptian Culture), first published in 1955, with Mahmoud Amin al-'Alim.

== Overview ==
'Abd al-'Azim Anis was born in Cairo, Egypt in 1923. He graduated from the faculty of sciences at Cairo University in 1944, he would then go on to study at the University of London where he graduated with a Doctor of Philosophy in mathematical statistics in 1952. Despite his criticism to the government that came into control following the 1952 Egyptian revolution, he still participated in demonstrations in the United Kingdom protesting against the United Kingdom's policies regarding Egypt during the Suez Crisis in 1956. He returned to Egypt later that year.

From a young age, he had been involved in political activism. In 1935, he had participated in protests against British foreign secretary Samuel Hoare, 1st Viscount Templewood following his comments that Egypt did not deserve independence. He was imprisoned along with hundreds of other communists in the beginning of 1959, during the rule of Gamal Abdel Nasser, due to his criticisms of the unification of Syria and Egypt under the United Arab Republic. He was released in 1964. While in prison, he authored his epistolary book Messages of Love, Pain, and Revolution.
