= Mahmoud Amin El Alem =

Egyptian Marxist cultural critic and theorist (1922–2009)

- محمود أمين العالم
- Born: February 18, 1922; El-Darb al-Ahmar, Cairo, Kingdom of Egypt
- Died: January 10, 2009 (aged 86); Cairo, Egypt
- Education: King Fuad I University (BA, MA)
- Occupations: Literary critic, philosopher, journalist, university lecturer
- Political party: Egyptian Communist Party
- Writing career
- Genres: Marxist literary criticism, cultural criticism, political philosophy
- Notable works: Fi al-Thaqafa al-Misriyya (في الثقافة المصرية); Thaqafat al-Thawra (ثقافة الثورة); Ta'ammulat fi 'Alam Naguib Mahfouz (تأملات في عالم نجيب محفوظ)
- Notable awards: State Merit Prize in Social Sciences (1998); Ibn Rushd Prize for Freedom of Thought (2001)
- Movements: Marxism, Arab nationalism, Socialist Realism

Mahmoud Amin El Alem (also Mahmud ʾAmin al-ʿAlim; February 18, 1922–January 10, 2009) was an Egyptian cultural critic and leading Marxist theorist. He was a leading public intellectual in Egypt in his day. El Alem was also the head of the administrative board of Akhbar el-Yom and editor of several newspapers and magazines, including Rose al-Yūsuf, ar-Risala al-gadida, Magallat al-musawwir, and Qadaya fikriyya.

== Education ==
El Alem began his education in the El-Darb al-Ahmar district of Cairo, attending a traditional Kuttab before studying at Al-Azhar primary schools.He subsequently pursued higher education at Fuad I University, earning his Bachelor of Arts in Philosophy in 1947.

He continued his postgraduate studies at the university's Faculty of Arts, receiving a Master of Arts degree in 1953 for his thesis examining causality in pragmatism.Following his M.A., he served as a teaching assistant in the Department of Philosophy while researching his Ph.D. dissertation on logical positivism, but his academic career was halted in 1954 when he was dismissed from his university position for political activism.

== Career ==
In the 1940s, El Alem rose to public prominence as a famous Egyptian communist leader. However, due to his political activism, he was arrested and convicted multiple times.

El Alem was expelled from the King Fuad University in 1954 for his political positions, which prevented from defending his doctoral thesis. Thereafter, he became a political prisoner from 1959–1963 because of his refusal to dissolve the Egyptian Communist Party into the Socialist Union set up by then President Gamal Abdel Nasser. Alongside Ismael Sabri Abdallah and Fouad Mursi, Al Elem later sought to support Arab nationalism through building an alliance between communists and nationalists to face the economic and political challenges of the Arab world.

His 1955 book Fi al-Thaqafa al-Misriyya (On Egyptian Culture), co-authored with 'Abd al-'Azim 'Anis, applied Marxist literary criticism to contemporary Egyptian cultural works.

El Alem was later appointed head of the National Theater Committee and became Director of Akhbar el-Yom Press Company.

Once Anwar Sadat assumed the presidency of Egypt, El Alem strongly opposed the Egyptian "Infitah" (policy of economic liberalization). He also opposed the peace policy with Israel. Consequently, El Alem was once again imprisoned.

Upon his release, he moved to Oxford, where he taught at St. Anthony’s College at Oxford University. He later accepted the invitation of his friend Jacques Berque to take charge of a chair on contemporary Arab thought in Paris; he became a lecturer at the University of Paris VIII (1974–1985) and at the École Normale. In Paris, he also launched "The Arab Left" newspaper, which published debates among left-wing activists.

El Alem returned to Egypt after President Anwar Sadat died in 1984.

== Legacy ==
=== Development of Marxist thought in Egypt ===
El Alem's work and life continue to be of interest today to scholars of Egyptian Marxism and Egyptian history post-independence. His "seminal work," On Egyptian Culture, has been called "a mainstay of late twentieth-century Arabic literary criticism" (323). He participated in intellectual feuds with Taha Husayn and also took on such Arabic literary giants as Naguib Mahfouz.

Historian Albert Hourani summarized El Alem's intellectual stance in On Egyptian Culture as follows:

"Culture...must reflect the whole nature and situation of a society, literature must try to show the relationship of the individual with the experience of his society. A literature which flees from that experience is empty; thus the writing which reflected bourgeois nationalism is now devoid of meaning. New writing must be judged by whether it adequately expresses the struggle with the ‘octopus of imperialism’ which is the basic fact about Egyptian life, and whether it mirrors the life of the working class. Seen in this light, the question of forms of expression becomes important. A gap between expression and content, [El Alem and 'Anis] suggest, is a sign of a flight from reality..."

=== Awards ===
- In 1998, El Alem was awarded Egypt's highest national prize, the Ga’izat ad-dawla at-taqdiriyya
- In 2001, he was awarded the Ibn Rushd Prize for Freedom of Thought

== Works ==
- Fi al-Thaqafa al-Misriyya (On Egyptian Culture), co-authored with 'Abd al-'Azim 'Anis (1st edition, 1955)
