= Muhammad Ahmad Khalafallah =

Egyptian Islamic modernist thinker and writer (1916–1998)

Muhammad Ahmad Khalafallah (Arabic: محمد أحمد خلف الله, 1916-1998) was an Egyptian Islamic modernist thinker and writer. He is known for advancing the literary interpretation of the Quran.

== Biography ==
=== Early life and education ===
Khalafallah was born in 1916 in Sharqīyah Province, Lower Egypt. His early education included traditional Islamic schools and a government school. He then studied at Dār al-ʿUlūm. He later attended the Faculty of Arts at Egyptian University, which eventually became Cairo University, graduating in 1939. He earned his M.A. in 1942, presenting a thesis on “Al-jadal fīal-Qurʿān” (Polemic in the Qurʿān). This work was published as Muḥammad wa-al-quwā al-muḍāddah (Muḥammad and the Forces of Opposition). Afterward, he took up a position as a tutor at the university.

=== Thesis controversy ===
In 1947, Cairo University refused his doctoral dissertation presented to the Department of Arabic entitled The Narrative Art in the Holy Qur'an (al-Fann al-qasasi fi al-Qurʾan al-karim), as he suggested that holy texts are allegoric and that they should not be seen as something fixed, but as a moral direction. As a pupil of Amin al-Khuli, he stated that one can study the Qur'an from a literary point of view. The Qur'an uses all rhetorical ways at its disposal, which includes metaphors, biblical and pre-Islamic narratives to convince people. In Khalafallah's opinion, historical truth is not the main goal, but rather the religious and ethic sense conveyed by these stories. Khalafallah has been accused to treat the Speech of God as if it was a human product. Yet, he does not question the authenticity of the revelation. He takes up a traditional theme, that of the inimitability (iʿjaz) of the Qur'an - the first title of his thesis was Min asrar al-iʿjaz, ("On the Secrets of the Qurʾan’s inimitability"). He was fired from his teaching position and transferred to the Ministry of Culture.

Afterwards, he started a thesis on a non-religious subject and received his doctorate in 1952. He ended his career at the Egyptian Ministry of Culture.

His doctoral thesis was finally published in 1954.

=== Later life ===
Khalafallah had a long tenure at the Ministry of Culture, where he eventually became undersecretary for planning. After retiring, he became engaged with the Egyptian Committee for Asian-African Solidarity and took on the role of vice president of the National Progressive Unionist (Tajammuʿ) party. He also served as the chief editor of the magazine Al-yaqzah al-ʿArabīyah (Arab Awakening). He died in 1998.

== Works ==
He wrote Mafāhīm Qurʼānīyah ( "Quranic concepts"), published in Arabic in 1984, al-Qur'ân-wa mushkilat hayâti-nâ l-mu'âsira ("The Qur'an and our contemporary problems"), al-Qur'ân wa l-dawla ("The Qur'an and the State"), and Al-Islām wa-al-ʿurūbah (Islam and Arabism).

== See also ==
- Islamic Modernism
- Arab socialism
