= Ibn Rushd Prize for Freedom of Thought =

- Country: Germany
- First award: 1999; 27 years ago
- Website: www.ibn-rushd.org

The Ibn Rushd Prize for Freedom of Thought (German: Ibn-Ruschd-Preis für freies Denken; Arabic: جائزة ابن رشد للفكر الحر) is a prestigious prize awarded in Germany which recognises independent, forward-thinking, individuals or organisations who have contributed to democracy and freedom of speech in the Arab world.

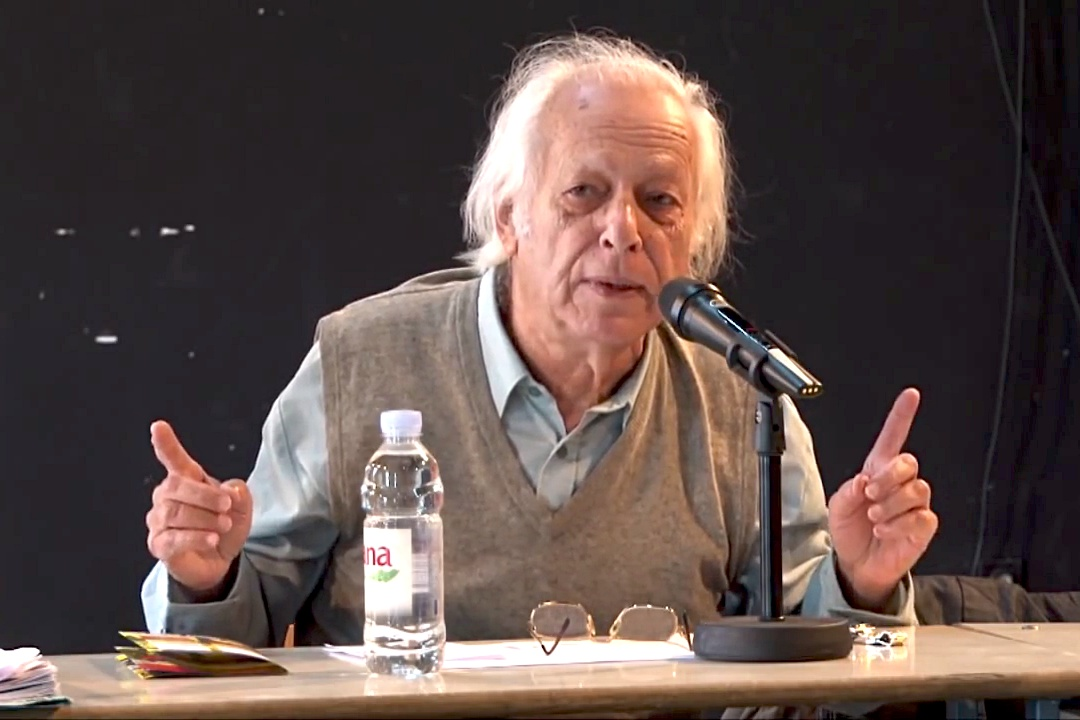
Samir Amin, 2009 winner

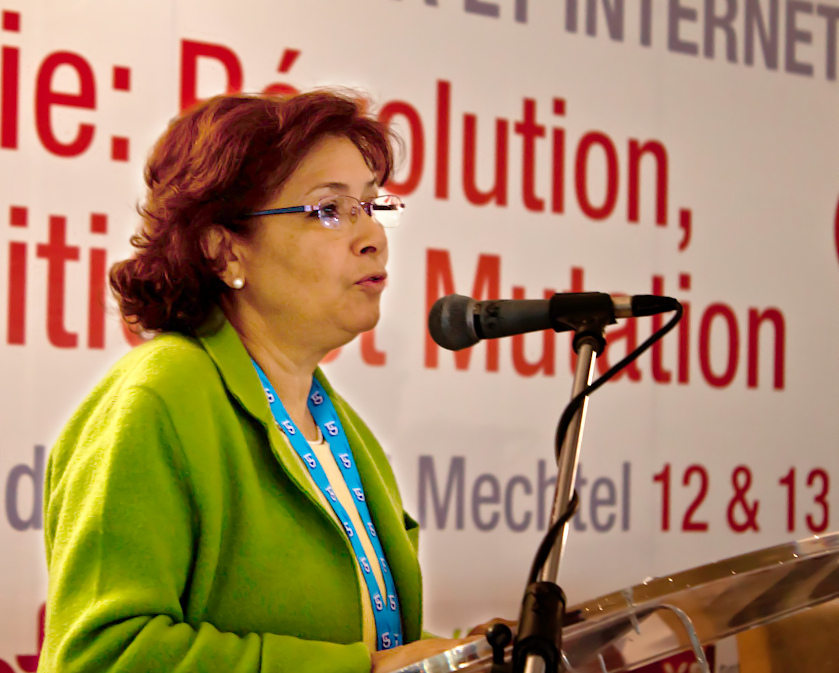
Sihem Bensedrine, 2011 winner

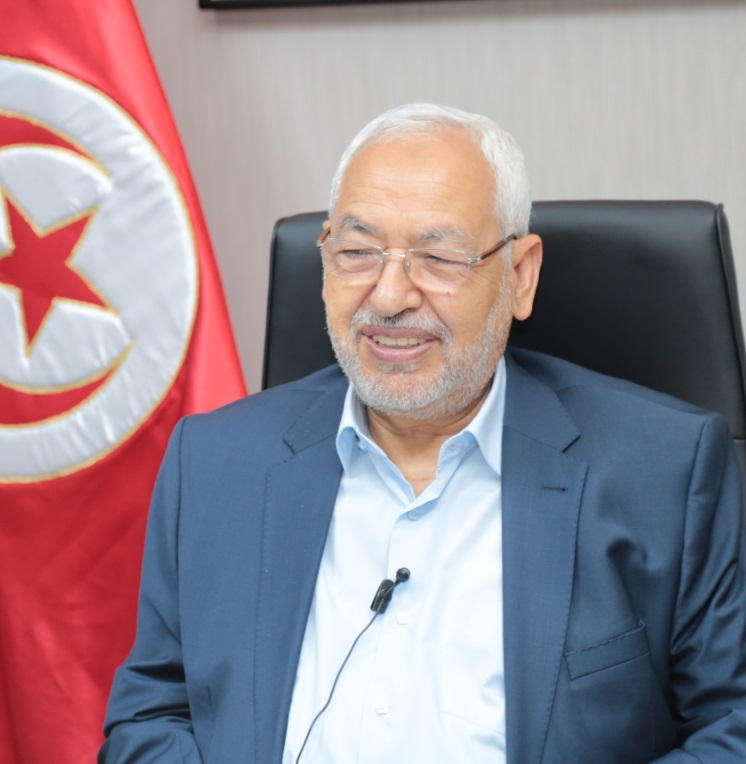
Rached Ghannouchi, 2014 winner

The prize has been awarded annually since 1999, with the exception of 2016, by the non-governmental Ibn-Rushd-Fund (مؤسسة ابن رشد للفكر الحر); the fund itself was founded in 1998 on the occasion of the 800th anniversary of the Andalusian philosopher and thinker Ibn Rushd's death (often Latinized as Averroes), and on the 50th anniversary of the UN Declaration of Human Rights.

== Prize winners ==
Year	Name	Country	Subject
1999	Al Jazeera	Qatar	Journalism
2000	Issam Abdulhadi	Palestine	Women's Rights
2001	Mahmoud Amin El Alem	Egypt	Criticism
2002	Azmi Bishara	Israel	Politics
2003	Mohammed Arkoun	Algeria	Philosophy
2004	Sonallah Ibrahim	Egypt	Literature
2005	Nasr Hamid Abu Zaid	Egypt	Reform of Islam
2006	Fatima Ahmed Ibrahim	Sudan	Human Rights
2007	Nouri Bouzid	Tunisia	Film
2008	Mohammed Abed al-Jabri	Morocco	Arab Renaissance
2009	Samir Amin	Egypt	Economy
2010	al-Hewar al-Mutamaddin	N/A	Internet-platform/Blog
2011	Sihem Bensedrine	Tunisia	Journalism
2012	Razan Zaitouneh	Syria	Arab Spring
2013	Rim Banna	Palestine	Music
2014	Rachid Ghannouchi	Tunisia	Modern Islam
2015	Aisha Odeh	Palestine	Literature
2017	Coalition for Accountability and Integrity (AMAN)	Palestine	Fight against corruption
2019	Sara Qaed	Bahrain	Caricature
2022	Adyan Foundation	Lebanon	Diversity
