= Nasr Abu Zayd =

Egyptian Quranic thinker, author, and academic (1943-2010)

Nasr Abuzid
- نصر حامد أبوزيد
- Born: July 10, 1943; Tanta, Egypt
- Died: July 5, 2010 (aged 66); Cairo, Egypt

Nasr Hamed Abuzid (Egyptian Arabic: نصر حامد أبو زيد, IPA: [ˈnɑsˤɾe ˈħæːmed ˈæbuˈzeːd]; also Nasr Abuzid or Nasr Abuzeid; July 10, 1943 – July 5, 2010) was an Egyptian Quranic thinker, author, academic and one of the leading liberal theologians in Islam. He is famous for his project of a humanistic Quranic hermeneutics, which "challenged mainstream views" on the Quran, sparking "controversy and debate." While not denying that the Quran was of divine origin, Abuzid argued that it was a "cultural product" that had to be read in the context of the language and culture of seventh century Arabs, and could be interpreted in more than one way. He also criticized the use of religion to exert political power. In 1995 an Egyptian Sharia court declared him an apostate, this led to threats of death and his fleeing Egypt several weeks later. He later quietly returned to Egypt where he died.

Abuzid has been referred to as among "the big names" of the post-1967 Arab intellectual tradition.

== Early life ==
Nasr Hamed Abuzid was born in Ohafa, a small village some 120 km from Cairo, near Tanta, Egypt on July 10, 1943. Abu Zayd went through a traditional religious school system and was a Qāriʾ who could recite the Qur'an with the proper rules of recitation, and a Hafiz one who has memorized the Quran completely from a young age.

At the age of 12, Abuzid was imprisoned for allegedly sympathising with the Muslim Brotherhood. He was also influenced by the writings of Muslim Brotherhood revolutionary Islamist Sayyid Qutb, who was executed by the Egyptian state in 1966, but moved away from the ideas of the Brethren and Qutb as he grew older. After receiving technical training he worked for the National Communications Organization in Cairo. At the same time, he started studying at Cairo University, where he obtained his BA degree in Arabic Studies (1972), and later his MA (1977) and PhD degrees (1981) in Islamic Studies, with works concerning the interpretation of the Qur'an.

== Career ==
In 1982, he joined the faculty of the Department of Arabic Language and Literature at Cairo University as an assistant professor. He became an associate professor there in 1987. From 1985 to 1989, he worked as a visiting lecturer at Osaka University of Foreign Studies in Japan.

In 1992 the process of his being considered for promotion to full professor at Cairo University morphed from a routine academic process into a "legal nightmare for him and his wife." While he was eventually promoted, he was sued by conservative Muslims and a Court of Appeals declared him an apostate and divorced him from his wife. This was followed by calls for his death and exile to Europe where he obtained the position of Visiting Professor of Arabic and Islamic Studies at Leiden University. (see below)

In Europe he held the Ibn Rushd Chair of Humanism and Islam at the University for Humanistics, Utrecht, Netherlands, while still supervising MA and PhD students at the University of Leiden as well. He also participated in a research project on Jewish and Islamic Hermeneutics as Cultural Critique in the Working Group on Islam and modernity at the Institute of Advanced Studies of Berlin (Wissenschaftskolleg zu Berlin). In 2005, he received the Ibn Rushd Prize for Freedom of Thought, Berlin. His wife returned several times to Egypt for discussion on MA and PhD theses at the French department at Cairo University. Dr. Abu Zayd also returned several times to Egypt after 1995, but mostly to visit family.

== Death ==
During a visit in Indonesia he was infected by an unknown virus, and was hospitalized in Cairo. He died at a Cairo hospital on July 5, 2010, at the age of 66. He was buried in his birthplace on the same day.

== Nasr Abuzid case ==
Abuzid's academic work on the Qur'an led to a lawsuit against him by conservative Muslim scholars. The subsequent hisbah trial led to him being declared an apostate (murtadd) by an Egyptian court. Since under Sharia law it is not permissible for a Muslim woman to be married to a non-Muslim man, the court also declared he could not remain married to his wife—Cairo University French Literature professor Dr. Ibtihal Younis. This decision, in effect, forced him out of his homeland.

=== Rejection of promotion ===
The Nasr Abuzid case began when he was refused a promotion for the post of full professor. In May 1992, Dr. Abu Zayd presented his academic publications to the Standing Committee of Academic Tenure and Promotion for advancement. Among his thirteen works in Arabic and other languages were Imam Shāfi'ī and the Founding of Medieval Ideology and The Critique of Religious Discourse. The committee presented three reports, two were in favor of the promotion of Dr. Abu Zayd. But the third one, written by Abdel-Sabour Shahin, a professor of Arabic linguistics at the Cairo Dar El-'Ulum, and a committee member, accused Abuzid of "clear affronts to the Islamic faith," and rejected the promotion.

Despite the two positive reports, the Tenure and Promotion Committee voted against the promotion (seven votes to six), arguing that his works did not justify a promotion. The Council of the Arabic Department made a statement against the committee's decision, and the Council of the Faculty of Arts criticized the committee report. Despite all that, the Council of Cairo University confirmed the decision of the committee report on 18 March 1993.

Not content with blocking the promotion, at the pulpit at Amr Ibn Al-`Aas Mosque where he was a preacher, Shahin publicly denounced Abu Zayd as an apostate (murtadd). Shortly thereafter a "flood of vitriolic articles accusing him of heresy" appeared in the "mainstream, semi-state press".

Critics of the case have noted that Shahin's interest in the beliefs of Abu Zayd may have been motivated by factors other than piety. In addition to being preacher during Friday Services at Cairo's oldest mosque and a host of a number of television and radio programs about Islam, Shahin was active in Egypt's ruling party as chairman of its religious committee. In addition:

Insiders also knew Shahine had been a consultant in the late 1980s to the Rayyan Investment Company. Rayyan had touted itself as an Islamic financial outfit, appealing to pious Muslims who believed that Islam forbids them to receive interest. It promised to pay them instead with Islamically sanctioned "dividends." Badly run, the firm went bankrupt, depriving thousand of Egyptians of their life savings. In his book, Abu Zaid cited Rayyan as an example of how some Islamists used religious discourse for ulterior motives and material gain. Shahine had not been pleased with the criticism.

=== Forced divorce proceedings ===
In June (April according to another account), the case moved beyond Cairo University when a group of Islamists led by the former state official, Muhammad Samida Abu Samada and including Shahin, filed a lawsuit before the Giza Lower Personal Status Court (family court) in Cairo demanding the nullification of the marriage between Abu Zayd and his wife, Dr. Ibtihal Younis, arguing that Islamic law forbids a marriage between a Muslim woman and an apostate. (The couple were not notified but heard about the case first in the tabloid newspapers.)

The court case was filed through personal status law for divorce because in this area "the Islamic Shari'a is still in force" in Egyptian law.

Filing cases of hisbah against Muslims who violated a "right of God" and thus disturbed the public order was at one time the function of an official known as the muhtasib before that function had lapsed. The lawsuit by the Islamists resurrected hisbah and had the advantage that the plaintiffs did not have to be directly affected by a defendant's alleged wrongdoing. The hisbah principles are stated in Article 89 and 110 of the Regulations Governing Sharia Courts in Egypt but were amended in 1998, too late to help Abu Zayd.

According to conservative Islamist scholars cited against Abu Zayd by the plaintiffs, the professor was an "ignorant" proponent of the Enlightenment "who understand[s] freedom of thought to mean freedom to lead the people to infidelity". Another called Abu Zayd's work "cultural AIDS" and "intellectual terrorism." (This critic was himself assailed as an apostate several years later for his own religious writings.)

On 27 January 1994, the Giza Personal Status Court rejected the demand because the plaintiff had no direct, personal interest in the matter. However, on June 14, 1995, Cairo's Court of Appeals reversed the lower court ruling in favor of the plaintiff, judge 'Abd al-'Alim Musa (who had worked for several years in Saudi Arabia) found Abu Zayd to be an apostate, and declaring the marriage of Abu Zayd and Ibtihal Younis null and void.

==== Reasoning of judgement ====
Among other things the court declared that the verse authorizing the discriminatory jizya tax on non-Muslims "is not subject to discussion", and that owning slave women is allowed under certain conditions by "clear Qur'anic verses that we must follow" Abu Zayd was also accused on not believing in jinn (genies).

The judgement stated that:

the defendant's proposition that the requirement of Christians and Jews to pay jizyah (poll tax) constitutes a reversal of humanity's efforts to establish a better world is contrary to the divine verses on the question of jizyah, in a manner considered by some, inappropriate, even for temporal matters and judgments notwithstanding its inappropriateness when dealing with the Qur'an and Sunnah, whose texts represent the pinnacle of humane and generous treatment of non-Muslim minorities. If non-Muslim countries were to grant their Muslim minorities even one-tenth of the rights accorded to non-Muslim minorities by Islam, instead of undertaking the mass murder of men, women, and children, this would be a step forward for humanity. The verse on jizyah, verse 29 of Surat al-Tawbah, which the defendant opposes, is not subject to discussion.

The judgment stated that the questioning by Abu Zayd of the permissibility in Islam of the ownership of slave girls, is "contrary to all the divine texts which permit such provided that the required conditions are met", and that the legitimacy of owning slaves is considered "religiously proven without doubt".

Court of Appeals head Judge 'Abd al- 'Alim Musa and his fellow jurists declared Abu Zayd to be "a threat to national security, saying that by attacking Islam, he had attacked the state on which it is founded." The conservative religious interpretation of the court was evidenced a month after the ruling, when Judge Alim told an Egyptian magazine that Muslims are required to believe in spirits, devils, and the throne of God.

In examining Abu Zayd's work and the charge against him of disbelieving in Jinn, scholar Michael Cook notes that Abu Zayd did not explicitly deny the existence of jinn, but explained their reason for being in the Qur'an as part of an appeal "to existing Arab conceptions of communication between genies and humans". Since jinn "were part of the culture of the Arabs at the time when the Quran was revealed" (and still are very much a part of Arab folk culture), without their inclusion "the notion of divine revelation" would have been difficult to accept.

==== Motivation ====
In addition to Abu Zayd's innovations in interpreting the Quran, his background as a critic of Islamic fundamentalism, and of Islamic investment companies in particular, (for one of which Abdel-Sabour Shahin had been a religious advisor), is thought to have played a part in motivating his opponents.

==== Promotion at Cairo University ====
The irony of the story occurred when Cairo University promoted Abu Zayd to full professor and the academic committee wrote:

After reviewing the works submitted by Dr. Abu-Zeid in his application for promotion, examining them both individually and as a whole, we have reached the following conclusion: his prodigious academic efforts demonstrate that he is a researcher well-rooted in his academic field, well-read in our Islamic intellectual traditions, and with a knowledge of all its many branches — Islamic principles, theology, jurisprudence, Sufism, Qur'anic studies, rhetoric and linguistics — He has not rested on the laurels of his in-depth knowledge of this field, but has taken a forthright, critical position. He does not attempt to make a critique until he has mastered the issues before him, investigating them by way of both traditional and modern methodologies. In sum he is a free thinker, aspiring only to the truth. If there is something urgent about his style, it stems from the urgency of the crisis which the contemporary Arab-Islamic World is witnessing and the necessity to honestly identify the ills of this world in order that an effective cure be found. Academic research should not be isolated from social problems, but should be allowed to participate in current debates and to suggest solutions to current dilemmas by allowing researchers to investigate and interpret as far as possible.

=== Reaction to decision ===
The decision provoked a great debate, criticism abroad because of the violation of fundamental human rights but anger against Abu Zayd and death threats in Egypt. Abu Zayd himself lamented, "it took one week for my name to be cursed all over Egypt. Even in my village they were saying I was teaching heresies to the students..."

==== Death threats ====
Shortly after the verdict was issued, a group of professors at al-Azhar University, the "theological centre of Egypt", issued a joint statement calling for Abu Zayd's execution. The Egyptian Islamic Jihad organization (which assassinated Egyptian president Anwar Sadat in 1981 and was engaged in a guerrilla war with the government at the time) issued a statement saying the professor should be killed for abandoning his Muslim faith. But calls for his death were not limited to insurgents. Even a newspaper published by the ruling political party of the ostensibly secular anti-fundamentalist regime, The Islamic Banner, declared that `execution` was a fitting penalty if Abu Zayd failed to repent. In addition Abu Zayd received threats in the mail, one promising "No matter how much the police tries to protect you, you will not get away."

Dr. Nasr Abu Zayd was protected by the police, but belief in his apostasy was so widespread that even a police officer guarding his house referred to him as a "kafir" when asked about the situation by a neighbor of Abu Zayd.

==== Case against decision ====
The Court case was based on the alleged apostasy of Nasr Abu Zayd, hence the decision was based on Qur'anic punishment. But the Egyptian Penal Code did not recognize apostasy, and Civil Law restricts the proof of apostasy to two possibilities: either a certificate from a specialized religious institution certifying that the individual has converted to another religion, or a confession by the individual that he has converted. Neither had been provided. Nasr Abu Zayd never declared himself to be an apostate. In an interview, he explained:

I'm sure that I'm a Muslim. My worst fear is that people in Europe may consider and treat me as a critic of Islam. I'm not. I'm not a new Salman Rushdie, and don't want to be welcomed and treated as such. I'm a researcher. I'm critical of old and modern Islamic thought. I treat the Qur'an as a naṣṣ (text) given by God to the Prophet Muhammad. That text is put into a human language, which is the Arabic language. When I said so, I was accused of saying that the Prophet Muhammad wrote the Qur'an. This is not a crisis of thought, but a crisis of conscience.

==== Exile ====
On 23 July 1995, the couple fled their homeland for an indefinite sabbatical. They flew to Madrid, then decided to go from Spain to the Netherlands, where he was invited to teach as a visiting professor at the Leiden University. Abu Zayd explained,

I couldn't take more than two months of around the clock security. Whenever someone came to visit they had to be cleared. Whenever I wanted to go out I had to coordinate with security. I couldn't just go to a coffee shop with my friends and play a round of backgammon. What kind of life was that?

Though his books were not officially banned in Egypt, they were pulled from the library shelves of his alma mater.

On November 8, 1999, he filed a suit against the Egyptian justice minister, demanding that the 1996 ruling which annulled the marriage be declared illegal.

=== Legacy ===
The Egyptian government "strived to ignore" the case. There were only brief mentions of it in the state-run media and no government official spoke in his defense. However, in 1998, the regulations governing Sharia courts in Egypt were amended making it impossible for individuals to file lawsuits accusing someone of apostasy, leaving the issue to the prerogative of the prosecution office.

The action against Abu Zayd was not isolated. During the 1990s there were several assaults on liberal intellectuals and artists in Egypt and elsewhere in the Muslim world. Ahmed Sobhy Mansour was dismissed from Al-Azhar University and imprisoned for six months. This was based on a verdict reached by the university itself on the grounds that he rejected a fundamental tenet of Islam in his research of truth of some of Muhammad's sayings, or Hadith. Egyptian Nobel laureate Naguib Mahfouz was stabbed in the neck by an Islamist in 1994, leaving him incapable of using his hand to write. Egyptian courts were the theatre of different lawsuits brought against intellectuals, journalists, and university professors such as Atif al-Iraqi, Ragaa al-Naqash, Mahmoud al-Tohami, and Youssef Chahine (for his film El-Mohager, The Emigrant).

Abu Zayd's case has been described as demonstrating the "coercive impulse behind much Islamism, as well as the unintended consequences of making concessions in its direction", as those conservatives calling for his killing included religious figures and media supposedly co-opted by the regime. Other became suspicious of "collusion" between "violent rebels and the conservative Islamists" who held "senior positions in some of Egypt's public institutions." Gilles Kepel cited the case as an example of moderate and violent Islamists sharing a tactical or ideological convergence which manifested as complimentary actions. Rather than the moderates undermining the extremists as some had hoped, "moderates" (such as Abdel-Sabour Shahin and The Islamic Banner) would singled out victims as "apostates" who were then executed (or in Zayd's case provided with a very credible threat of murder) by the extremists (such as Egyptian Islamic Jihad). The "moderates" would deplore fanaticism of the extremists in public, but plead "attenuating circumstance" on their behalf when the need arose.

His case has been compared to controversies over interpretation of the Quran involving Taha Hussein in the 1920s and Muhammad Ahmad Khalafallah in the 1940s. The fact that a well established/respected scholar like Abu Zayd "suffered more concretely" than the other two is an illustration of "the gains made by Islamists in the last half of the 20th century.

== Thought ==
According to scholar Navid Kermani "three key themes" emerge from Abuzid's work:

1. to trace the various interpretations and historical settings of the single Qur'anic text from the early days of Islam up to the present;
2. to demonstrate the "interpretational diversity" (al-ta 'addud alta 'wili) that exists within the Islamic tradition;
3. and to show how this diversity has been "increasingly neglected" across Islamic history.

Abuzid saw himself as an heir to the Muʿtazila, "particularly their idea of the created Qurʿān and their tendency toward metaphorical interpretation."

=== Quran as text ===
Abuzid strongly opposed the belief in a "single, precise and valid interpretation of the Qur'an handed down by the Prophet for all times".

In his view, the Quran made Islamic Arab culture a `culture of the text` (hadarat al-nass) par excellence, but because the language of the Quran is not self-explanatory, this implied Islamic Arab culture was also a culture of interpretation (hadarat al-ta'wil). Abu Zayd emphasized "intellect" (`aql) in understanding the Quran, as opposed to "a hermeneutical approach which gives priority to the narrated traditions [ hadith ]" (naql). As a reflection of this Abu Zaid used the term ta'wil (interpretation) for efforts to understand the Quran, while in the Islamic sciences, the literature that explained the Quran was referred to as tafsir (commentary, explanation).

For Abuzid, interpretation goes beyond explanation or commentary, "for without" the Qur'an would not have meaning:

The [Qur'anic] text changed from the very first moment — that is, when the Prophet recited it at the moment of its revelation — from its existence as a divine text (nass ilahi), and became something understandable, a human text (nass insani), because it changed from revelation to interpretation (li-annahu tahawwala min al-tanzil ila al-ta'wil). The Prophet's understanding of the text is one of the first phases of movement resulting from the text's connection with the human intellect.

=== Humanistic hermeneutics of the Quran ===
From the beginning of his academic career, Abu Zaid developed a renewed hermeneutic view (the theory and methodology of text interpretation) of the Qur'an and further Islamic holy texts, arguing that they should be interpreted in the historical and cultural context of their time. The mistake of many Muslim scholars was "to see the Qur'an only as a text, which led conservatives as well as liberals to a battle of quotations, each group seeing clear verses (when on their side) and ambiguous ones (when in contradiction with their vision)". But this type of controversy led both conservatives and liberals to produce authoritative hermeneutics. This vision of the Qur'an as a text was the vision of the elites of Muslim societies, whereas, at the same time, the Qur'an as "an oral discourse" played the most important part in the understanding of the masses.

Nasr Abuzid called for another reading of the holy book through a "humanistic hermeneutics", an interpretation which sees the Qur'an as a living phenomenon, a discourse. Hence, the Qur'an can be "the outcome of dialogue, debate, despite argument, acceptance and rejection". This liberal interpretation of Islam should open space for new perspectives on the religion and social change in Muslim societies.

Abu Zayd's analysis finds several "insistent calls for social justice" in the Qur'an . One example is when Muhammad—busy preaching to the rich people of Quraysh—failed to pay attention to a poor blind fellow named Ibn Umm Maktūm who came asking Muhammad for advice. The Quran strongly criticizes Muhammad's attitude. (Quran 80:10)

Abu Zayd also argued that while the Qur'anic discourse was built in a patriarchal society, and therefore the addressees were naturally males, who received permission to marry, divorce, and marry off their female relatives, it is "possible to imagine that Muslim women receive the same rights", and so the Quran had a "tendency to improve women's rights". The classical position of the modern 'ulamā' about that issue is understandable as "they still believe in superiority of the male in the family".

Abu Zayd's critical approach to classical and contemporary Islamic discourse in the fields of theology, philosophy, law, politics, and humanism, promoted modern Islamic thought that might enable Muslims to build a bridge between their own tradition and the modern world of freedom of speech, equality (minority rights, women's rights, social justice), human rights, democracy and globalisation.

== Honors and distinctions ==
- 1975–1977: Ford Foundation Fellowship at the American University in Cairo.
- 1978–1979: Ford Foundation Fellowship at the Center for Middle East Studies of the University of Pennsylvania, Philadelphia USA.
- 1982: Obtained the 'Abdel-'Azīz al-Ahwānī Prize for Humanities.
- 1985–1989: Visiting Professor, Osaka University of Foreign Studies Japan.
- 1993: The President of Tunisia conferred the Republican Order of Merit for services to Arab culture in May.
- 1994– Member of the Advisory Board for the "Encyclopædia of the Qur'an"
- 1995–: Visiting Professor at Leiden University, The Netherlands.
- 1998: The Jordanian Writers Association Award for Democracy and Freedom.
- 2000–2001: The Cleveringa Honorary Chair in Law, Responsibility, Freedom of Religion and Conscience, Leiden University.
- 2002: The Roosevelt Institute Medal for Freedom of Worship.
- 2002–2003: Fellow at the Wissenschaftskolleg zu Berlin.

== Awards ==
- The Ibn Rushd Prize for Freedom of Thought for the year 2005 in Berlin.

== Works ==
Abuzid has authored at least fourteen books in Arabic, including works on the Muʿtazila, Ibn Arabi, Al-Shafi'i, and Qurʿanic criticism, as well as books in English and articles in both languages.

=== Books in Arabic ===
- Rationalism in Exegesis: A Study of the Problem of Metaphor in the Writing of the Mutazilites (Al-Ittijāh al-'Aqlī fī al-Tafsīr: Dirāsah fī Qadīyat al-Majāz fī al-Qur'ân 'inda al-Mu'tazilah), Beirut and Casablanca 1982, 4th edition 1998.
- The Philosophy of Hermeneutics: A Study of Ibn al-'Arabī's Hermeneutics of the Qur'ān (Falsafat al-Ta'wīl: Dirâsah fi Ta'wīl al-Qur'ān 'inda Muḥyī al-Dīn ibn al-'Arabī), Beirut and Casablanca 1983, 4th edition, 1998.
- The Systems of Signs: An Introduction to Semiotics ('Ilm al-'Alāmāt), co-editor, Cairo 1986.
- The Concept of the Text: A Study of the Qur'anic Sciences (Mafhūm al-Naṣṣ: Dirāsah fī 'Ulūm al-Qur'an), Beirut and Cairo 1991, 5th edition 1998.
- The Problematic of Reading and the Tools Of Interpretation (Ishkālīyāt al-Qirā'ah wa-Āliyāt al-Ta'wīl), Beirut and Casablanca 1995, 5th edition 1999.
- Imam al-Shafi'i and the Foundation of the Ideology of the Middle Path [Wasatiyya] (al-Imâm al-Shāfi'ī wa-Ta'sīs al-Īdiyūlūjīyah al-Wasaṭīyah), Cairo, 3rd edition 1998.
- Critique of Religious Discourse (Naqd al-Khiṭāb al-Dīnī), Cairo, 4th edition 1998.
- Women in the Discourse of Crisis (al-Mar'ah fī Khiṭāb al-Azmah), Cairo 1995. See extract in English here : Dossier 17: Women in the Discourse of Crisis, September 1997, Translated by Marlene Tadros.
- Thinking in the Time of Anathema (al-Tafkīr fī Zaman al-Takfīr), Cairo, 3ed edition 1998.
- The Caliphate and the Authority of the People (al-Khilāfah wa-Sulṭat al-Ummah), Cairo, 1995.
- Text, Authority, Truth (al-Naṣṣ, al-Sulṭah, al-Haqīqah), Beirut and Casablanca 1995, second edition 1997.
- Circles of Fear: Reading the Discourse about Women (Dawā'ir al-Khawf: Qirā'ah fī Khiṭāb al-Mar'ah) Beirut and Casablanca 1999.
- Discourse and Hermeneutics (al-Khiṭāb wa-al-Ta'wīl), Beirut and Casablanca 2000.
- Thus Spoke Ibn al-'Arabī (Hākadhā Takallama Ibn al-'Arabī) The Egyptian National Organization for Books, Cairo 2002.

=== Books in English ===
- Reformation of Islamic Thought: A Critical Historical Analysis. Amsterdam: Amsterdam University Press, 2006.
- Rethinking the Qur'an: Towards a Humanistic Hermeneutics. Utrecht: Humanistics University Press, 2004.
- Voice of an Exile: Reflections on Islam (with Esther R. Nelson). New York: Praeger Publishers, 2004.

=== Articles in English ===
- Al-Ghazali's Theory of Interpretation, Journal of Osaka University of Foreign Studies, Japan, 72, 1986, pp. 1–24.
- The Perfect Man in the Qur'an: Textual Analysis, Journal of Osaka University of Foreign Studies, Japan, no. 73, 1988, pp. 111–133.
- The Case of Abu-Zaid, Index on Censorship, London, 4, 1996, pp. 30–39.
- Linguistic Exposition of God in the Qur'an in Fundamentalismus der Moderne, Christen und Muslime im Dialog, Evangelische Akademie, Loccum, Germany, 75/94, 1996, pp. 97–110.
- The Textuality of The Koran in Islam and Europe in Past and Present, NIAS (Netherlands Institute for Advanced Study in The Humanities and Social Sciences), 1997, pp. 43 – 52.
- Divine Attributes in the Qur'an: Some poetic aspects in Islam and Modernity, edited by John Cooper, Ronald Nettler and Mohammed Mahmoud, I.B. Tauris, London, 1998, pp. 120–211.
- Inquisition Trial in Egypt, in Human Rights in Islam 15, RIMO, Maastricht 1998, pp. 47–55.
- Islam, Muslims and Democracy, in Religion und Politik, Konrad-Adenauer-Stiftung, intere Studie Nr. 151/1998, pp. 103–12.
- Literature and Heresy–Literature and Justice: The Critical Potential of Enlightened religion in Literatur, Menschenrechte in Islamischen Gesellschaften und Staaten, Evangelische Akademie Loccum 22/96, 1998, pp. 18–32.
- The Concept of Human Rights, the Process of Modernization and the Politics of Western Domination, in Politik und Gesellschaft: International Politics and Society, Herausgegeben von der Friedrich-Ebert-Stiftung, 4/1998, pp. 434–437.
- The Modernization of Islam or the Islamization of Modernity, in Cosmopolitanism, Identity and Authenticity in the Middle East, ed. Roel Meijer, Curzon Press, England 1999, pp 71–86.
- Islamic Cosmology and Qur'anic Exegesis, in Religion Wandel der Kosmologien, edited by Dieter Zeller, Sonderdruck 1999, pp. 217–230.
- The Sectarian and the Renaissance Discourse, translated and introduced by Mona Mikhail, ALIF, Journal of Comparative Poetics, The American University of Cairo, no 19, 1999, pp. 203–222
- The Image of Europe in Modern Egyptian Narrative, in Colonizer and Colonized, Eds. Theo D'haen and Patricia Krüs, Rodopi, Amsterdam-Atlanta 2000, vol. 2, pp. 627–643.
- The Qur'an: God and Man in Communication: Inaugural Lecture for the Cleveringa Chair at Leiden University (November 27, 2000)
- The Qur'anic Concept of Justice, Polylog, forum for Intercultural Philosophizing', No. 3 (June 2001).
- The Qur'an, Islam and Muhammad, Reset-Dialogues on Civilizations.
- Heaven, Which Way? Al-Ahram Weekly, issue No. 603.
- The Dilemma of the Literary Approach to the Qur'an, ALIF, Journal of Comparative Poetics, the American University Cairo (AUC), No. 23, Literature and the Sacred, 2003, pp. 8–47.
- Spricht Gott nur Arabisch? (Does God Speak Arabic?), in Michael Thumann (ed), Der Islam und der Westen, Berliner Taschenbuch Verlag, Berlin 2003, pp. 117–126.
- Entries in the Encyclopædia of the Qur'ān, Brill, Leiden-Boston-Köln:
  - Arrogance, Vol. I (2001), pp. 158–161.
  - Everyday Life: Qur'an In, Vol. II (2002), pp. 80–97.
  - Illness and Health, Vol. II (2002), pp. 501–502.
  - Intention, Vol. II (2002), pp. 549–551.
  - Oppression, Vol III (2003), pp. 583–584.
- Islam in Europe/Europe Against Islam! Europe, Open Your Eyes, in: Robertson-von Trotha, Caroline Y. (ed.): Europe: Insights from the Outside (= Kulturwissenschaft interdisziplinär/Interdisciplinary Studies on Culture and Society, Vol. 5), Baden-Baden 2011, pp. 67–73.

=== Book reviews in English ===
- Beyond The Written Words: Oral Aspects of Scripture in the History of Religion by William A. Graham, Die Welt des Islam, E.J. Brill, Leiden, 1995, 35, 1, pp. 150–152.
- Muslims, Jews and Pagans: Studies on Early Islamic Medina, by Micheal Lecker, Bibliotheca Orientalis LV No. 1 / 2, January–April 1998, Column 275–8.
- Paradise Lost: Reflections on the Struggle for Authenticity in the Middle East by C.A.O. van Nieuwenhuijze, Bibliotheca Orientalis LVI No. 3/4, May–August 1999, Column 510–513.
- Image of the Prophet Muhammad in the West, A Study of Muir, Margoliouth and Watt, by Jabal Muhammad Buaben, Bibliotheca Orientalis LVI No. 3/4, May–August 1999, Column 518–522.
- Reforming the Muslim World, by M.A. Shoudhury, Biblitheca Orientalis, LV11 No.1/2, January–April 2000 columns 221–224.
- Islamic Banking and Interest: a study of the Prohibition of Riba and its Contemporary Interpretation by Abdullad Saeed, Bibliotheca Orientalis, LV11 No. 5/6, September–December 2000 column 736–739.

=== Translations ===
==== English ====
- Critique of Religious Discourse, translated by Jonathan Wright, Yale University Press, 2018.

==== German ====
===== Books =====
- Politik und Islam: Kritik des Religiösen Diskurses, translated by Cherifa Magdi, Dipa-Verlag, Frankfurt, 1996.
- Ein Leben mit dem Islam (Life with Islam) autobiography edited by Navid Kermani, translated by Sharifa Magdi, Herder 1999.

===== Articles =====
- Islam und Menschenrechte (Islam and Human Rights), Kas. Auslands-Informationen, Konrad Adenauer Stiftung, 5, 1996, pp. 51–59.
- Die Frauenfrage zwischen Fundamentalismus und Aufklärung by Salima Salih, in Islam-Demokratie-Moderne, Aktuelle Antworten arabicher Denker, Verlag C.H. Beck, München, 1998, pp. 193–210.
- Jochen Hippler, Nasr Hamid Abu Zaid, Amr Hamzawy: Krieg, Repression, Terrorismus. Politische Gewalt und Zivilisation in westlichen und muslimischen Gesellschaften. ifa, Stuttgart 2006, (Review)

==== Dutch ====
- Vernieuwing in het islamitisch denken, translated by Fred and Rob Leemhuis, Uitgeverij BULAAQ, Amsterdam, 1996.
- Islam en democratie: convergenties of divergenties? In de hemel op aarde - De gelovige burger in multiculturele democratie, Davidfonds Leuven 1998, pp. 114–128.
- Mijn Leven met de Islam, Becht. Haarlem, 2002

==== French ====
- Le Discours religieux contemporain: mécanismes et fondements intellectuels, translated by Nachwa al-Azhari, Edwige Lambert and Iman Farag, In: Egypte/Monde arabe, No.3, 3e trimestre, 1990, Cairo, Cedej, pp. 73–120.
- Critique du Discours religieux, translated by Mohamed Chairet, Sindbad Actes Sud, 1999.

==== Indonesian ====
- Imam Syafi'i: Moderatisme – Eklektisime – Arabisme, translated by Khoiron Nahdliyyin, LKIS, 1997.

==== Italian ====
- Islâm e Storia, Critica del discorso religioso, Bollati Boringhieri, 2002.
- Testo sacro e libertà. Per una lettura critica del Corano, texts by Nasr Hamid Abu Zayd edited by Federica Fedeli, introduction by Nina zu Fürstenberg, I libri di Reset, Marsilio, Venice 2012, ISBN 978-88-317-1091-6
- Una vita con l'Islam, Il Mulino, 2004

==== Persian ====
- Mafhūm al-Waḥy, by Muhammad Taqi Karmi, in Naqd o Nazar, vol 3, no. 4, Fall 1997, pp. 376–433.
- al-Tārīkhīyah: al-Mafhūm al-Multabis, by Muhammad Taqi Karmi, in Naqd o Nazar, vol 3, no. 4, Fall 1997, pp. 328–375

==== Turkish ====
- Universal Principles of Shari'ah: A New Reading, translated from Arabic to Turkish by Mostafa Unver, Journal of Islamic Research, Ankara, Turkey, vol. 8, n. 2, 1995, pp. 139–143.
- The Problem of Qur'anic Hermeneutics, from Classical to Recent Period by Ömer Özsoy, Journal of Islamic Research, Ankara, Turkey, vol. 9, no. 1-2-3-4, 1996, pp. 24–44.
- The Foundation of The Moderate Ideology in Islamic Thought by al-Shāi'îī, translated by M. Hayri Kırbasoğlu, in Sunni Paradigmanın Olusumunda, Kitabiyat, Ankara 2000, pp. 89–148.
- 'İslam'la bir Yaşam, İletişim Yayınları, 2004
