= National Consultative Ethics Committee for Health and Life Sciences =

The Comité Consultatif National d'Ethique (National Ethics Advisory Committee) is a French governmental advisory council on bioethics issues. It was created by a presidential decree of François Mitterrand in 1983.

The CCNE plays an important role in addressing the ethical and societal implications of scientific and medical progress. Its mission is to issue opinions on ethical questions arising from developments in biology, medicine and healthcare, while informing public debate and policymakers. It also promotes public participation in ethical discussions, helping citizens understand the challenges associated with emerging technologies and scientific advances, including genetic testing, end-of-life care and biomedical innovations. Through its multidisciplinary approach, the committee contributes to a broader reflection on the ethical limits and social consequences of scientific progress.

== History ==
Following the birth of Amandine, the first French baby conceived through in vitro fertilisation in 1982, the National Research Conference was launched in 1982 by Jean-Pierre Chevènement and Philippe Lazar, then director of the French National Institute of Health and Medical Research (Inserm). The National Consultative Ethics Committee (CCNE) was established by decree of President François Mitterrand on 23 February 1983. Its mission were subsequently amended by several decrees and laws.

The first issues addressed by the committee included medically assisted reproduction, experimentation on human beings, research on the human embryo, access to genetic information, and the concept of informed consent. The first president of the CCNE was Professor Jean Bernard (1983–1993), followed by Professor Jean-Pierre Changeux (1993–1999), Professor Didier Sicard (1999–2007), Professor Alain Grimfeld (2010–2012), Professor Jean-Claude Ameisen (2012–2016), and Professor Jean-François Delfraissy, who took office on 14 December 2016.

In September 2022, for the first time in its history, the CCNE expressed support for active assistance in dying, primarily assisted suicide, in Opinion No. 139. This opinion helped pave the way for the Citizens' Convention on the End of Life. Under such an approach, a person could receive active assistance in carrying out their wish to end their life, or ask a physician to end their life under strict conditions.

The CCNE thus revised its position, particularly in relation to illnesses with medium- or long-term life-threatening prognoses for which no treatment options are currently available, whereas "continuous deep sedation" is provided for situations in which death is expected in the short term. The CCNE therefore considers that there is "a pathway towards the ethical implementation of active assistance in dying".

== Composition ==
The CCNE is consulted upon referral by various organizations or government institutions, as well as through self-referral. Composed of scientists, physicians, philosophers, legal experts, theologians from all faiths (until September 2013, when they were removed by the government), and journalists, the CCNE is the only French and international committee that is entirely independent of any supervisory authority, with the exception of its appointment process.

The CCNE issued its first opinion on 22 May 1984, concerning the collection of tissue from deceased human embryos and human fetuses for therapeutic, diagnostic, and scientific purposes. Since then, it has issued around one hundred publicly accessible opinions on a wide range of important issues, including the status of embryos, prenatal diagnosis, the conditions governing organ donation, the procurement and use of stem cells, end-of-life rights (euthanasia), healthcare in prisons, and predictions based on the detection of early behavioural disorders in children.

=== Current members ===
The current composition of the CCNE is as follows:

- Jean-François Delfraissy, president, appointed on 4 December 2016 and reappointed on 21 January 2019 by decree of Emmanuel Macron.
- Honorary presidents: Jean Claude Ameisen, Jean-Pierre Changeux, Alain Grimfeld, and Didier Sicard.
- Vice-president: Karine Lefeuvre.
- 5 individuals appointed by the President of the Republic and representing the main philosophical and spiritual traditions: Abdennour Bidar, Marion Muller-Colard, Cynthia Fleury, Dominique Quinio, and Frédéric Worms.
- 15 individuals belonging to the research sector: Emmanuel Didier, Catherine Patrat, Mounira Amor-Guéret, Régis Aubry, Thomas Bourgeron, Monique Canto-Sperber, Laure Coulombel, Pierre-Henri Duée, Anne Durandy, Marie-Germaine Bousser, Jean-François Bach, Francis Puech, Gilles Adda, Anne Pelle, and Claude Delpuech.
- 19 qualified individuals selected for their expertise and interest in ethical issues: François Ansermet, Christiane Basset, Gilles Bœuf, Yves Charpenel, Claire Hedon, Sophie Crozier, Caroline Martin, Pierre Delmas-Goyon, Lionel Naccache, Florence Gruat, Alexandra Benachi, Martine Le Friant, Corinne Imbert, Jean-Pierre Mignard, Karine Lefeuvre, Michel Van-Praët, Claude Kirchner, Marc Delatte, and Florence Jusot.

== Debate over the composition of the CCNE ==
The Ayrault government carried out the statutory renewal of the CCNE's membership on 11 September 2013. Among those appointed to the CCNE were individuals close to President François Hollande, such as Jean-Marie Delarue (honorary member of the Conseil d'État and Comptroller General of Places of Deprivation of Liberty) and Michelle Meunier (Socialist Party senator and member of the Committee on Social Affairs and the Delegation for Women's Rights and Equal Opportunities between Men and Women). The Conseil d'État appointed Jean-Pierre Mignard, a lawyer and co-editor of the newspaper Témoignage Chrétien. The two new representatives of the "main philosophical and spiritual traditions" appointed by the president were no longer members of the clergy, but laypeople from civil society who specialised in religious issues. Thus, pastor Louis Schweitzer was replaced by Marianne Carbonnier-Burkard, a historian specialising in the Protestant Reformation; neurologist Lionel Naccache, also known for his writings on the Talmud, succeeded Rabbi Michaël Azoulay. As their positions were not due for renewal, theologian Xavier Lacroix continued to represent the Catholic "school of thought", while philosopher Abdennour Bidar represented the Muslim tradition. "Appointing laypeople rather than individuals belonging to religious hierarchies is a good thing, because the latter inevitably end up bringing their religion into the debate", said Didier Sicard, former president of the CCNE.

This renewal prompted considerable criticism from religious authorities and right-wing elected officials. The latter viewed the decision as "a political manoeuvre intended to 'quietly change the political complexion' of the CCNE ahead of major debates on euthanasia and the extension of medically assisted reproduction to same-sex couples, as individuals known for their left-wing sympathies or friendship with the President of the Republic had just been appointed by him", according to journalist Delphine de Mallevoüe of Le Figaro. However, Jean-Marie Delarue had publicly opposed same-sex marriage in France.

According to Patrick Gaudray, a genetic researcher and chair of the CCNE's technical committee, the CCNE is not a politicised forum: People cannot hold rigid, dogmatic positions. Otherwise, we would not be able to function. They take the time to listen to one another in order to reach more nuanced positions. Indeed, it is sometimes difficult to determine their political leanings.

== See also ==
- National Commission for the Protection of Human Subjects of Biomedical and Behavioral Research (U.S. 1974–1978)
- President's Commission for the Study of Ethical Problems in Medicine and Biomedical and Behavioral Research (U.S. 1978–1983)
- National Bioethics Advisory Commission (U.S. 1996–2001)
- The President's Council on Bioethics (U.S. 2001–2009)
