= Éric Postaire =

French pharmacist

Éric Postaire, born 23 March 1957 in Cherbourg, is a French pharmacist. Member of the National Academy of Pharmacy. He works for the reenchantment of science. He was thus the key player in the creation of the Centre d'Interprétation du Patrimoine Terre de Louis Pasteur in the Jura in 2012.

== Biography ==
=== Family ===
Éric Postaire is the son of Janine and Pierre and the younger brother of Michel Postaire. He is married to Martine and has two children, Benjamin and Romain. His parents left Cherbourg to settle in the Paris region when he was only 3 years old.

=== Studies and career ===
He studied in Vanves at the Lycée Michelet where he passed his Bac C in 1975 before moving on to study pharmacy at the Chatenay-Malabry Faculty of Pharmacy (University of Paris Sud), then to a hospital career (as an intern and then hospital practitioner) and specialising in Pharmacochemistry by obtaining a Doctorate in Pharmaceutical Sciences in 1986.

During his pharmacy internship (early 1980s) and then as a hospital practitioner in Paris, Éric Postaire turned towards clinical pharmacy while his Doctorate of Science in Pharmacochemistry (1986) completed this orientation with a laboratory activity in chemistry.

He was a hospital pharmacist and lecturer in clinical pharmacy at the University of Paris XI in the 1980s and 1990s, director of research and development in the industrial company Oenobiol for about ten years, then director of research in health-nutrition within the Danone Group and finally in a subsidiary of the Institut Pasteur (PasteurMed) as medical director.

In 2003, he then joined the French National Institute for Health and Medical Research (Inserm) as Director of the Clinical and Therapeutic Research Department, then within the General Directorate for Research and Innovation at the Ministry of Higher Education and Research.

Professor at ISEAM (Institut supérieur d'études en alternance du management) of the HEMEA Group (Haut enseignement du management en alternance) until 2018, elected national corresponding member in 2012 and then full member in 2015 at the National Academy of Pharmacy, Physical and Chemical Sciences, former auditor of the Institut des hautes études en sciences et technologie de la promotion 2011–2012, he has been advisor to the Secrétaires Perpétuels and Director of Foresight of the French Academy of Sciences since 2010.

== Scientific contribution ==
Éric Postaire has developed research axes in clinical pharmacy in the direction of clinical methodology for therapeutic drug research and specific medical approaches such as: hemodialysis, medical device, enteral and parenteral nutrition. At the same time, it has set up basic research, the results of which have made it possible to establish relations between oxidative stress and immune functions.

In 2003, he joined Inserm to set up the clinical research department at the institute's head office under the direction of Christian Bréchot where he was able to develop the national network of clinical investigation centres and Biological Resource Centres (Biobanks), Inserm's clinical research promotion activities in conjunction with the Strategic Orientation and Monitoring of Clinical Trials Committee (Cossec), biotherapies in Inserm units, etc. In 2007, he participated in the setting up of thematic research and care networks (RTRS) from the Directorate General for Research and Innovation of the Ministry of Higher Education and Research.

Since 2010, he has been an advisor to the Secrétaires Perpétuels of the French Academy of Sciences where he participated in the creation in October 2011 of the foundation for scientific cooperation: Fondation pour l'éducation à la science La main à la pâte, then chaired by Pierre Léna.

He was the delegate of the president of the foundation Maison de Louis Pasteur. He developed the "Terre de Louis Pasteur" heritage interpretation centre project in conjunction with the Jura General Council and the communes of Dole and Arbois, which became a Public Establishment for Cultural Cooperation (EPCC) in January 2014.

He is currently in charge of the partnership foresight of the French Academy of sciences, particularly in the framework of the programme for a scientific universalism initiated on his recommendations in June 2014.

== Publications ==
He has published to date more than 120 scientific articles and approximately 20 patents.

- Les Matières plastiques à usage pharmaceutiques. Lavoisier, 1991 (coordination)
- Les Épidémies du XXI^{e} Siècle, L'Âge d'homme, 1997
- La Santé est dans votre assiette, Hachette, 2001.
- L'Enfant et les écrans, Avis de l'Académie des sciences, Le Pommier, 2013 (editorial secretary).
- Les origines du vivant. Folio Essai. Co-editor of the book with Roland Douce, 2017.

== Prizes and distinctions ==
- Expert analyst since 1984
- Recipient of the National Academy of Pharmacy Annual Award (1985)
- Recipient of the Annual Hospital Pharmacy Research Award (1987)
- Fellow of the New York Academy of Science since 1992
- Pharmaceutical expert at the French Medicines Agency (1994)
- Member of the American Association for the Advancement of Science since 1994
- Appointed Vice-president of the UNESCO World Academy of Biomedical Technologies in 1999.
- Listed among the Who's Who 500 Barons in 1999
- National Corresponding Member in 2012, then Full Member of the National Academy of Pharmacy in March 2015
- Chevalier of the Ordre des Palmes Académiques in 2013
- Award of the International Society of Antioxidants for his scientific and medical contribution. June 2019.
