= Criticism of Islamism =

The ideas and practices of the leaders, preachers, and movements of the Islamic revival movement known as Islamism (also referred to as Political Islam) have been criticized by non-Muslims and Muslims (often Islamic modernists and liberals).

Among those authors, scholars and leaders who have criticized Islamism, or some element of it, are Maajid Nawaz, Reza Aslan, Abdelwahab Meddeb, Muhammad Sa'id al-'Ashmawi, Khaled Abu al-Fadl, Gilles Kepel, Matthias Küntzel, Joseph E. B. Lumbard, Olivier Roy, and Indonesian Islamic group Nahdlatul Ulama.

Tenets of the Islamist movement that have come under criticism include: restrictions on freedom of expression to prevent apostasy from and insults to Islam; that Islam is not only a religion but a governing system; that historical Sharia, or Islamic law, is one, universal system of law, accessible to humanity, and necessary to enforcement for Islam to be truly practiced.

== Explanation ==
Explaining the development of Islamism (or at least jihadist Islamism), one critic (Khaled Abou El Fadl) describes it as not so much an expression of religious revival and resurgence, but a phenomenon created by several factors:

- The undermining of the independence and religious authority of Islamic jurists, who traditionally "tolerated and even celebrated divergent opinions and schools of thought and kept extremism marginalized". The state seizure of the private religious endowments (awqaf) that supported the jurists in most post-colonialist Muslim countries has relegated most jurists to salaried employees of the state, diminishing their legitimacy on matters social and political."
- The advance of Saudi Arabian doctrine of Wahhabism into this vacuum of religious authority. Financed by tens of billions of dollars of petroleum-export money and proselytizing aggressively, the doctrine billed itself not as one school among many, but as a return to the one, true, orthodox "straight path" of Islam – pristine, simple, straightforward. It differed from the traditional teachings of the jurists in its "strict literalism ... extreme hostility to intellectualism, mysticism, and any sectarian divisions within Islam".
- Added to this Wahhabi literalism and narrowness are populist appeals to Muslim humiliation suffered in the modern age at the hands of harshly despotic governments, and interventionist non-Muslim powers."

== Suppression of dissent ==
=== Limits on freedom of expression ===
According to Graham Fuller, a long-time observer of Middle Eastern politics and supporter of allowing Islamists to participate in politics, "One of the most egregious and damaging roles" played by some Islamists has been in "ruthlessly" attacking and instituting legal proceedings "against any writings on Islam they disagree with."

Some of the early victims of Islamist enforcement of orthodoxy include Ahmad Kasravi, a former cleric and important intellectual figure of 1940s Iran who was assassinated in 1946 by the Fadayan-e Islam, an Islamic militant group, on the charge of takfir.

Mahmoud Mohamed Taha, a 76-year-old "practicing Muslim" and theologian was hanged in a public ceremony in Khartoum, January 18, 1985, for among other charges "heresy" and "opposing application of Islamic law". Taha had opposed Sharia law in its historical form, as it was instituted in Sudan, because he believed the Quranic verses on which it was primarily based (known as the Medina verses) were adapted for a specific place and purpose – namely ruling the seventh-century Islamic city-state of Medina – and were abrogated by verses revealed in Mecca, which (Taha believed) represented the Islamic "ideal religion".

Maybe the most famous alleged apostate in the Arab world attacked by Islamists was Egyptian author and Nobel Prize winner Naguib Mahfouz, who was harassed and stabbed in the neck by assailants, almost killed and crippled for the rest of his life. Others include novelist Egyptian Salahaddin Muhsin who

... was sentenced to three years hard labor for writings that 'offended Islam'; [Egyptian] feminist novelist Nawal El Saadawi has been repeatedly tried in court for anti-Islamic writing and her husband ordered to divorce her as a Muslim apostate, although the charges were ultimately struck down; Islamist lawyers also charged Islamic and Arabic literature professor Nasr Abu Zayd with apostasy for his writings on the background of the Qur'an, and his wife was ordered to divorce him. ..."

Egyptian author Farag Foda was assassinated on June 8, 1992 by militants of the Gamaa Islamiya as an example to other anti-fundamentalist intellectuals.

While Islamists are often separated into "bad" extremists, and "good" moderates working within the system, political scientist Gilles Kepel points out that in Egypt in the 1990s "Islamist moderates and the extremists complemented one another's actions." In the case of Farag Foda's killing, "moderate" Sheik Mohammed al-Ghazali ("one of the most revered sheiks in the Muslim world"), testified for the defense in the trial of Foda's killers. "He announced that anyone born Muslim who militated against the sharia (as Foda had done) was guilty of the crime of apostasy, for which the punishment was death. In the absence of an Islamic state to carry out this sentence, those who assumed that responsibility were not blameworthy."

=== Takfir ===
Some Islamists have evolved beyond targeting liberal and secular intellectuals to attacking more mainstream Muslims (what researchers Matteo Sisto and Samir Gurung dub "Neo-Takfirism"). In the Algerian Civil War the insurgent/jihadist Islamist group GIA viewed all who failed to actively support its jihad as collaborators with the government, and thus apostates from Islam and eligible military targets. The group slaughtered entire villages, murdered foreigners, and executed Algerians for "violating Islamic law," for "infractions ranging from infidelity to wearing Western clothing." In the Iraq civil war, takfir was also defined broadly by Sunni Islamist insurgents. By mid-2006, at least two falafel venders in Baghdad were killed "because falafel did not exist in the seventh century", and was thus an unIslamic "innovation" (Bid'ah) in the eyes of the killers. This was seen as a reflection of how far the followers of Sayyid Qutb had progressed in their willingness to takfir and kill those who (they believed) were guilty of apostasy according to some (such as journalist George Packer). As of mid-2014, the jihadi Islamist groups Al Qaeda and Da'ish had killed "more than 300 Sunni imams and preachers", according to one "prominent Iraqi Sunni cleric" (Khaled al-Mulla). Some months later Da'ish reportedly executed one of its own Sharia judges on the grounds that he had "excessive takfiri tendencies".

==== Khawarij ====
Some Islamists have been condemned by other Muslims as Kharijites for their willingness to takfir (declare other Muslims to be unbelievers) and kill self-professed Muslims. While Islamist often argue that they are returning to Islam unpolluted by Western Enlightenment ideas of freedom of thought and expression, early Islam also condemned extreme strictness in the form of the 7th century to the Kharijites. From their essentially political position, they developed extreme doctrines that set them apart from both mainstream Sunni and Shiʿa Muslims. The Kharijites were particularly noted for their readiness to takfir self-professed Muslims.

== Historical basis ==
=== Debate on early Islam ===
Some critics (such as Tunisian-born scholar and journalist Abdelwahab Meddeb) have bemoaned the Islamist belief that in 1400 years of Muslim history, true Islam worthy of imitation was enforced for only a few decades. Sayyid Qutb (d. 1966) preached that Islam has been extinct for "centuries" and that it is "necessary that the Muslim community be restored to its original form," and follow the example of Muhammad and his the original companions (Sahabah), who not only cut themselves off from any non-Islamic culture or learning – Greek, Roman, Persian, Christian or Jewish logic, art, poetry, etc. – but separated themselves "completely" from their "past life," of family and friends.

Islamists do not agree on when true and original Islam was in existence. Abul Ala Maududi indicates it was the era of the Prophet and the 30-year reign of the four "rightly guided caliphs" (Rashidun). Qutb's brother Muhammad thought the only time "Islam was ... enforced in its true form" following the death of Muhammad was for fifteen years, during the first two caliphs, plus three years from 717 to 720 A.D. For the Shiite Ayatollah Khomeini, the reign of Muhammad and the five-year reign of Caliph Ali were the truly Islamic eras Muslims should imitate.

Meddeb protests that this excludes not only any non-Muslim culture, but most of Muslim history including the Golden Age of Islam:

How can one benefit from the past and the present if one comes to the conclusion that the only Islam that conforms to the sovereignty of God is that of Medina of the first four caliphs? ... Can one still ... love and respond to the beauties handed down by the many peoples of Islam through the variety of their historic contribution?

He and at least one other author (Tarek Osman) have questioned how perfect an era was where three of the first four caliphs were assassinated, while "enmities" and "factional disputes" and "almost continuous embarrassing episodes of blood-letting and internal struggles", were played out. Meddeb points out the celebration of rightly guided originated not shortly after their end but generations later, with conservative scholar Ibn Hanbal.

== Ideological flaws ==
=== Vagueness ===
Author Tarek Osman has criticized Islamism as promising "everything to everyone", leading to unsustainable conflicts and contradictions: an alternative social provider to the poor masses; an angry platform for the disillusioned young; a loud trumpet-call announcing 'a return to the pure religion' to those seeking an identity; a "progressive, moderate religious platform' for the affluent and liberal; ... and at the extremes, a violent vehicle for rejectionists and radicals."

=== Emphasis on politics ===
Although Islamism is a movement devoted to the preeminence of Islam in all fields some have suggested that belief has been neglected in favor of politics, and that "organizers, enthusiasts, and politicians," rather than those focusing on spirituality or religion, have "had the most impact" in the movement.

Other observers have remarked on the narrowness of Islamism, and its lack of interest in studying and making sense of the world in general. Habib Boulares regrets that the movement in general has "devoted little energy to constructing consistent theories" and has made 'no contribution either to Islamic thought or spirituality'. Olivier Roy complains of its intellectual stagnation in that "since the founding writings of Abul Ala Maududi, Hasan al-Banna, Sayyid Qutb ... all before 1978 ... there are nothing but brochures, prayers, feeble glosses and citations of canonical authors."

An ex-activist (Ed Husain) of one of the Islamist groups active in Britain (Hizb ut-Tahrir), wrote in his book The Islamist that he felt politics was crowding out his "relationship with God", and saw the same in other HT activists. Husain complained "We sermonized about the need for Muslims to return to Islam, but many of the shabab [activists] did not know how to pray."

Another observer (Olivier Roy) complained that even systematic study of human society and behavior is dismissed as un-Islamic:

There is neither history, since nothing new has happened except a return to the jahiliyya of pre-Islamic times, nor anthropology, since man is simply the exercise of virtue (there is no depth psychology in Islam: sin is not an introduction to the other within), nor sociology, since segmentation is fitna, splitting of the community, and thus an attack on the divine oneness the community reflects. Anything, in fact, that differentiates is seen as a menace to the unity of the community...

=== Dependence on virtue ===
Roy also argues that the basic strategy of Islamism suffers from "a vicious circle" of "no Islamic state without virtuous Muslims, no virtuous Muslims without an Islamic state". This is because for Islamists, "Islamic society exists only through politics, but the political institutions function only a result of the virtue of those who run them, a virtue that can become widespread only if the society is Islamic beforehand." The process of choosing a leader involves not issues such as the structure of elections, of checks and balances on power, but searching for "subjective" qualities: the amir must "abstain from sin", incarnate "sincerity, equity, justice, purity" have "sincerity, ability and loyalty", "moral integrity as well as ... other relevant criteria" (Hassan al-Turabi).

== Political system ==
=== Unification of religion and state ===
One of the most commonly quoted slogans in the movement is that of the Muslim Brotherhood: al-islam dinun was dawlatun (Islam is a religion and a state). But, as one critic complains, the slogan "is neither a verse of the Qur'an nor a quote from a hadith but a 19th-century political slogan popularised by the Salafi movement" — an origin in 19th-century being problematic for a belief system predicated on following the scripture revealed, and the ways of those who lived, twelve centuries earlier.

==== Historical context ====
Critics contend that this unification is not unique to Islam but to the premodern era, or at least the era around the time of Muhammad.

According to Reza Aslan:

This was also an era in which religion and the state were one unified entity. ... no Jew, Christian, Zoroastrian, or Muslim of this time would have considered his or her religion to be rooted in the personal confessional experiences of individuals. ... Your religion was your ethnicity, your culture, and your social identity ... your religion was your citizenship.

The post-Julian Roman Empire was Christian, with one "officially sanctioned and legally enforced version" of (Nicene) Christianity. The Sassanid Empire in Persia was Zoroastrian, again with one officially sanctioned and legally enforced version of Zoroastrianism. On the Indian subcontinent, Vaisnava kingdoms (devotees of Vishnu and his incarnations) fought with Savia kingdoms (devotees of Shiva) for territorial control. In China, Buddhist rulers fought Taoist rulers for political ascendancy. "Thus every religion was a 'religion of the sword.'"

==== Historical necessity ====
Critics also suggest that the early combination of religion and state in Muslim society may have been a product of its creation in the stateless world of Arab society where Muslims needed a state to protect themselves, rather than the timeless essence of Islam.

Christianity was based within the "massive and enduring" Roman Empire. The Hebrews had "ethnic bonds before becoming Jews." But unlike these other Abrahamic religions, "the Muslims depended on their religion to provide them with an authority and an identity."

Mohammad founded a religious community ex nihilo. He lived in western Arabia, a stateless region where tribal affiliations dominated all of public life. A tribe protected its members (by threatening to take revenge for them), and it provided social bonds, economic opportunities, as well as political enfranchisement. An individual lacking tribal ties had no standing: he could be robbed, raped, and killed with impunity. If Muhammad was to attract tribesmen to join his movement, he had to provide them with an affiliation no less powerful than the tribe they had left behind.

=== Historical lack of governmental system ===
Jebran Chamieh also argues that while it is true Muhammad exercised the executive power, commanded armies, controlled the finances and revenues, made legal judgements, he created no organized system for these functions.

Moreover, the Prophet had ample time before his death to organize the Moslem community politically. The most pressing measure was to establish a system for the legal transmission of power. He was aware of the rivalry among his followers over the succession and could have delegated his authority to prevent dissensions among them. But he did not. These observations lend credence to those who argue that the Prophet never intended to form a state and that his mission was purely religious.

Chamieh also points out that this practice (or lack thereof) was followed by the Rashidun caliphate, who never established a "police force to keep law and order". When "the rebels attacked Caliph Othman in his house and assassinated him, no security measures were available to protect him. The caliphs did not establish an administration, a fiscal system, or a budget ... In the conquered lands, they retained the previous Byzantine and Persian administrative systems and kept the local employees to administer the country."

Dissenting from the orthodoxy that the Quran, Muhammad or the Rashidun had much to say about governance (or that Shura is a "pillar of Islam"), are some Islamic Modernists.

Taha Hussein (1889-1973) writes:

Government in the time of the Prophet was not delegated from heaven in its details; people were left free to manage their affairs as they wish within the limits of fairness and justice. Furthermore, the Quran did not propose, in general terms or in detail, a political system, and the Prophet did not indicate who should be his successor either orally or in written form.

==== Scriptural basis ====
===== Hukm =====
The scriptural basis of the Islamist principle that God – in the form of Sharia law – must govern, comes, at least in part, from the Quranic phrase that Hukm is God's alone, according to one of the founders of Islamist thought, Abul Ala Maududi. However, journalist and author Abdelwahab Meddeb questions this idea on the grounds that the definition of the Arabic word hukm is broader then simply "to govern", and that the ayah Maududi quoted is not about governing or government. Hukm is usually defined as to "exercise power as governing, to pronounce a sentence, to judge between two parties, to be knowledgeable (in medicine, in philosophy), to be wise, prudent, of a considered judgment". The full ayat where the phrase appears says:

Those who you adore outside of Him are nothing but names that you and your fathers have given them. God has granted them no authority. Hukm is God's alone. He has commanded that you adore none but Him. Such is the right religion, but most people do not know. ^{[Quran 12:40]}

Which suggests that the Quran is talking about God's superiority over pagan idols, rather than His role in government. According to Meddeb, Quranic "commentators never forget to remind us that this verse is devoted to the powerlessness of the companion deities (pardras) that idolaters raise up next to God..."

===== Shura =====
Regarding the Quran's comments on shura (collective decision-making) Jebran Chemiah notes that while it is mentioned in the Quran twice, the comments say nothing further than that it is a good practice. The modality of the process, when, where and how shura should be used, whether the advise given must be followed, is not explained. Hadith, where obscure Quranic references are often explained when a theme from the Quran is thought worthy of explaining, say little or nothing. There is no evidence Muhammad held regular shura meetings with companions or ever felt their advice was binding on him when they gave it. (Note: As for the people who are to be consulted in shura -- Ahl al-Hal Wal 'Aqd -- Chemiah notes they have been given a name but not criteria for choosing them. He quotes Islamic jurist Zafer Qasemi of Damascus: "This was an Islamic constitutional invention for which I could not find an explicit text in the Quran or sunna. For that reason, the expression remained a hypothetical speculation discussed by jurists, and transmitted from one generation to the next, with no impact on Islamic political life. I have searched in vain for the origin of this expression, but could not find who first proclaimed, or used it. I am certain that because this principle was never used, it remained theoretical and ambiguous.")

=== Islamic economics ===
Criticism of Islamist (or Islamic) economics have been particularly contemptuous, alleging that effort of "incoherence, incompleteness, impracticality, and irrelevance;" driven by "cultural identity" rather than problem solving. Another source has dismissed it as "a hodgepodge of populist and socialist ideas," in theory and "nothing more than inefficient state control of the economy and some almost equally ineffective redistribution policies," in practice.

In a political and regional context where Islamist and ulema claim to have an opinion about everything, it is striking how little they have to say about this most central of human activities, beyond repetitious pieties about how their model is neither capitalist nor socialist.

==== Riba ====
In Pakistan, the process of Islamization, including the banning of interest on loans or riba, got underway with military ruler General Zia al-Haq (1977–1988), a supporter of "Islamic resurgence" who pledged to eliminate 'the curse of interest.' One critic of this attempt, Kemal A. Faruki, complained that (at least in their initial attempts) Islamizers wasted much effort on "learned discussions on riba" and "doubtful distinctions between 'interest' and 'guaranteed profits,' etc." in Western-style banks, "while turning a blind eye" to a far more serious problem outside of the formal, Western-style banking system:

usury perpetrated on the illiterate and the poor by soodkhuris (lit. 'devourers of usury'). These officially registered moneylenders under the Moneylenders Act are permitted to lend at not more than 1% below the State Bank rate. In fact they are Mafia-like individuals who charge interest as high as 60% per annum collected ruthlessly in monthly installments and refuse to accept repayment of the principal sum indefinitely. Their tactics include intimidation and force.

==== Social justice ====
On the same note, another critic has attacked Islamist organizations in that country for silence about "any kind of genuine social or economic revolution, except to urge, appropriately, that laws, including taxation, be universally applied." In the strongly Islamic country of Pakistan for example, this despite the fact that "social injustice is rampant, extreme poverty exists, and a feudal political and social order are deeply rooted from eras preceding the country's founding." This lack of interest is not unique to Pakistan. "The great questions of gross maldistribution of economic benefits, huge disparities in income, and feudal systems of landholding and human control remain largely outside the Islamist critique."

== Islamist interpretations of Sharia ==
Criticisms of Sharia law – or orthodox traditional historical interpretation of sharia law – are varied and not always in agreement. They include: that Islamist leaders are often ignorant of Islamic law, the Islamist definition of Sharia is in error, its implementation is impractical, and that flexible solutions have been ignored, that its scriptural basis has been corrupted, and that its enforcement is un-Islamic.

=== Ignorance ===
Despite the great importance Islamists gave to strict adherence to Sharia, many were not trained jurists. Islamic scholar and moderate Abou el Fadl complains that "neither Qutb nor Mawdudi were trained jurists, and their knowledge of the Islamic jurisprudential tradition was minimal. Nevertheless, like 'Abd al-Wahhad, Mawdudi and Qutb imagined Islamic law to be a set of clear cut, inflexible and rigid positive commands that covered and regulated every aspect of life."

Dale C. Eikmeier points out the "questionable religious credentials" of many Islamist theorists, or "Qutbists," which can be a "means to discredit them and their message":

With the exception of Abul Ala Maududi and Abdullah Azzam, none of Qutbism's main theoreticians trained at Islam's recognized centers of learning. Although a devout Muslim, Hassan al Banna was a teacher and community activist. Sayyid Qutb was a literary critic. Muhammad Abd al-Salam Faraj was an electrician. Ayman al-Zawahiri is a physician. Osama bin Laden trained to be a businessman.

=== Sharia as single universal set of laws to obey ===
Islamists such as Sayyid Qutb and Ayatollah Khomeini have argued that true Islam and a Muslim community cannot be said to exist without the application of Sharia law. According to Qutb, "The Muslim community with these characteristics vanished at the moment the laws of God [i.e. Sharia] became suspended on earth."

Khomeini preaches that Islamic government is needed

if the Islamic order is to be preserved and all individuals are to pursue the just path of Islam without any deviation, if innovation and the approval of the anti-Islamic laws by sham parliaments are to be prevented,

and in this Islamic government, (in fact "in Islam")

the legislative power and competence to establish laws belongs exclusively to God Almighty. The Sacred Legislator of Islam is the sole legislative power. No one has the right to legislate and no law may be executed except the law of the Divine Legislator.

Abou El Fadl replies that the Quran itself seems to deny there is one sharia for everyone to obey:

'To each of you God has prescribed a Law [Sharia] and a Way. If God would have willed, He would have made you a single people. But God's purpose is to test you in what he has given each of you, so strive in the pursuit of virtue, and know that you will all return to God [in the Hereafter], and He will resolve all the matters in which you disagree.' ^{[Quran 5:48]}

According to these dissenters the definition of Sharia as being the body of Muslim jurisprudence, its various commentaries and interpretations, only came later in Islamic history. Many modernists argue this jurisprudence is "entirely man-made, written by Muslim scholars according to their various schools, based on their best understanding of how the Qur'an should be translated into codes of law."

One scholar, Muhammad Sa'id al-'Ashmawi a specialist in comparative and Islamic law at Cairo University, argues that the term Sharia, as used in the Qur'an, refers not to legal rules but rather to "the path of Islam consisting of three streams: 1) worship, 2) ethical code, and 3) social intercourse. Thus al-'Ashmawi and many other modernists insist that the Shari'a is very different than Islamic jurisprudence (fiqh) and that fiqh must be reinterpreted anew by scholars in every age in accordance with their understanding."

"In Turkey, the Islamist [or post-Islamist] Justice and Development Party has many members who speak of Sharia as a metaphor for a moral society."

Thus "there is no one Sharia but rather many different, even contesting ways to build a legal structure in accordance with God's vision for mankind."

One difference between this interpretation and the orthodox Sharia is in the penalty for apostasy from Islam. According to non-Islamist Sudanese cleric Abdullahi Ahmed An-Na'im, the Islamist interpretation of sharia, "is fundamentally inconsistent with the numerous provisions of the Quran and Sunna which enjoin freedom of religion and expression."

An illustration of the lack of a single universal Sharia is the fact that its proponents do not agree on one. Legal scholar Sadakat Kadri complains that

the supposed purists cannot even agree on which sins to repress. Saudi Arabia forces women to be veiled and forbids them to drive, while Iran allows females to show their faces behind wheels but threatens them with jail if they expose too much hair. Sunni rigorist insist that God hates men to be clean shaven, whereas Tehran's Ministry of Culture suggests in July 2010 that He was more perturbed by ponytails and mullets. Some extremists have even attached spiritual significance to customs that mandate physical violence, such as female genital mutilation and so-called honor killings, oblivious to the pagan roots of the first practice and the unequivocal hostility of the Qur'an and hadiths to the second one.

=== Overly simplistic ===
A related criticism is that Islamist "politics of identity have relegated the Sharia to a level of political slogan, instead of elevating it to the level of intellectual complexity at which our jurisprudential forefather discussed it, debated it, and wrote about it. .... Superficial political chants claiming that the Qur'an is our constitution or that the Shari'a is our guide," are heard but not discussion "of what a constitution is, which parts of the Qur'an are 'constitutional,' or how the Shari'a is to guide us on any particular matter of legal relevance."

=== Historical record ===
Leading Islamists maintain that in addition to being divine, Sharia (or again orthodox Sharia), is easy to implement. Qutb believed that Sharia would be no problem to implement because there is "no vagueness or looseness" in its provisions. Khomeini contended

Islam has made the necessary provision; and if laws are needed, Islam has established them all. There is no need for you, after establishing a government, to sit down and draw up laws, or, like rulers who worship foreigners and are infatuated with the west, run after others to borrow their laws. Everything is ready and waiting.

But critics complain that strict application of orthodox Sharia law has been tried repeatedly throughout Islamic history and always found to be impractical.

Olivier Roy refers to the call to enforce Sharia, as a periodic cycle of Islamic history "as old as Islam itself." But one that is "still new because it has never been fulfilled. It is a tendency that is forever setting the reformer, the censor, and tribunal against the corruption of the times and of sovereigns, against foreign influence, political opportunism, moral laxity, and the forgetting of sacred texts."

According to Daniel Pipes, "the historical record shows that every effort in modern times to apply the Shari'a in its entirety – such as those made in Saudi Arabia, the Sudan, Libya, Iran, and Pakistan – ended up disappointing the fundamentalists, for realities eventually had to be accommodated. Every government devoted to full implementation finds this an impossible assignment."

=== Quran as Constitution ===
"The Quran is our Constitution" or "the Quran is our law," (Note: King Faisal of Saudi Arabia speaking in 1966 about whether the KSA would adopt a constitution: "Constitution? What for? The Koran is the oldest and most efficient constitution in the world.") is "the slogan encountered from the Egyptian Muslim Brotherhood to the Afghan Islamists." But non-Islamist criticism replies that only 245 of the 6000 verses in the Quran concern legislation. Among those only 90 concern constitutional, civil, financial or economic matter, scarcely enough to form a constitution. There is a resolution in Constitution of Pakistan that no law or policy can go against "the principles of Islam".

=== Ignoring Maslaha ===
A solution to this problem that is embraced by modernists and often ignored by Islamists, is the inclusion of the principle that Islamic law must serve the general common good or maslaha. This open-ended requirement clashes with Qutb's idea that there is "no vagueness or looseness" in Sharia. Dale Eickelman and James Piscatori write:

Many modernist use as the point of departure the well-established Islamic concept of maslaha (the public interest or common good.) For those schools that place priority on the role of maslaha in Islamic thinking, Islam by definition serves the common good; therefore, if a given policy or position demonstrably does not serve the public interest it simply is "not Islam". This formulation is used by the huge Muhammadiyah movement in Indonesia, among others. The pioneering Egyptian Islamic thinker Muhammad 'Abduh spoke in similar terms when he criticized Muslim neglect of the concept of 'common good' and rulers' emphasis on obedience above justice.

Ibn Aqil believed Islamic law could consider the welfare of those who broke Islamic law and go beyond what was "explicitly supported" by the Quran.

Islam approves of all policy which creates good and eradicates evil even when it is not based on any revelation. That is how the Companions of the Prophet understood Islam. Abu Bakr for example, appointed Umar to succeed him without precedent. Umar suspended the Quranically mandated punishment of hand amputation during a famine, he suspended it also when he discovered that two thieves, the employees of Hatib, were under-paid. And so on.

=== Ignoring problems with the development of orthodox Sharia ===
Finally there is the question of accuracy of the ahadith or sayings of the Prophet which forms the basis of most Sharia law. The sayings were not written down for some generations but transmitted orally. An elaborate method (the hadith sciences) has been developed to verify and rate hadith according to levels of authenticity, including isnad or chains of the hadith's transmission. Nonetheless, these were often not essential elements "in the dissemination of a hadith ... before the 9th century, when the collections were completed. Joseph Schacht's extensive research on the development of the Shariah has shown how quite a large number of widely acknowledged hadith had their chain of transmission added conjecturally so as to make them appear more authentic. Hence Schacht's maxim: 'the more perfect the isnad, the later the tradition.'" But as a non-Muslim Orientialist, the persuasive authority of Schacht and his works are limited.

Aside from these doubts of hadith, orthodox and Islamist teachers ignore the history of the development of Islamic jurisprudence over centuries maintaining that "Islamic law has not come into being the way conventional law has." It did not begin "with a few rules that gradually multiplied or with rudimentary concepts refined by cultural process with the passage of time." When in fact, according to Aslan, "that is exactly how the Shariah developed: 'with rudimentary concepts refined by cultural process with the passage of time.' This was a process influenced not only by local cultural practices but by both Talmudic and Roman law. ... the sources from which these [early schools of law] formed their traditions, especially ijma, allowed for the evolution of thought. For this reason, their opinions of the Ulama ... were constantly adapting to contemporary situations, and the law itself was continually reinterpreted and reapplied as necessary."

In the meantime at madrassas in the Muslim world, thousands of "young Muslims are indoctrinated in a revival of Traditionalist orthodoxy especially with regard to the static, literalist interpretation of the Quran and the divine, infallible nature of the Shariah."

=== Compulsion in Sharia ===
Islamist governments such as Iran's have emphasized compulsion in personal behavior (such as the wearing of hijab) enforced with religious police. The question here is, if compelling people to obey Shariah law means they may be obeying out of fear of punishment by men rather than devotion to God's law, and whether this obedience from fear negates the merit of the act in the eyes of God. Compulsion in religious observance deprives "the observant of the credit for following God's order through personal volition. Only free acts of piety and worship have merit in God's eyes."

==== Case of hijab ====
Hijab, or covering of a woman's head and body, is arguably "the most distinctive emblem of Islam". Compulsory wearing of the hijab is also a hallmark of Islamist states such as Iran and famously the Taliban Afghanistan. In the Islamic Republic of Iran, the Prosecutor-General, Abolfazl Musavi-Tabrizi has been quoted as saying: "Any one who rejects the principle of hijab in Iran is an apostate and the punishment for an apostate under Islamic law is death" (August 15, 1991). The Taliban's Islamic Emirate requires women to cover not only their head but their face as well, because "the face of a woman is a source of corruption" for men not related to them. The burqa Afghan women were required to wear in public was the most drastic form of hijab with very limited vision. Both states claim they are simply enforcing Sharia law.

"True terror" has reportedly been used to enforce hijab "in Pakistan, Kashmir, and Afghanistan," according to a Rand Corporation commentary by Cheryl Benard. "[H]undreds of women have been blinded or maimed when acid was thrown on their unveiled faces by male fanatics who considered them improperly dressed," for failure to wear hijab. An example being use of acid against women by Islamist leader Gulbuddin Hekmatyar in the 1970s, and a 2001 "acid attack on four young Muslim women in Srinagar ... by an unknown militant outfit, and the swift compliance by women of all ages on the issue of wearing the chadar (head-dress) in public."

Islamists in other countries have been accused of attacking or threatening to attack the faces of women in an effort to intimidate them from wearing of makeup or allegedly immodest dress. (Note: Following the mandating of the covering of hair by women in the Islamic Republic of Iran, a hijab-less woman was shopping. According to her: "A bearded young man approached me. He said he would throw acid on my face if I did not comply with the rules.") (Note: In 2006, a group in Gaza calling itself "Just Swords of Islam" is reported to have claimed it threw acid at the face of a young woman who was dressed "immodestly," and warned other women in Gaza that they must wear hijab.) (Note: Iranian journalist Amir Taheri tells of an 18-year-old college student at the American University in Beirut who on the eve of 'Ashura in 1985 "was surrounded and attacked by a group of youths – all members of Hezb-Allah, the Party of Allah. They objected to the 'lax way' in which they thought she was dressed, and accused her of 'insulting the blood of the martyrs' by not having her hair fully covered. Then one of the youths threw 'a burning liquid' on her face." According to Taheri, "scores – some say hundreds – of women ... in Baalbek, in Beirut, in southern Lebanon and in many other Muslim cities from Tunis to Kuala Lumpur," were attacked in a similar manner from 1980 to 1986.)

But according to some critics there is a real question as to the scriptural or historical basis of this basic issue of Muslim women's lives. According to Leila Ahmed, nowhere in the whole of the Quran is "the term hijab applied to any woman other than the wives of Muhammad." Such critics claim that the veil predates the revelation of the Quran as it "was introduced into Arabia long before Muhammad, primarily through Arab contacts with Syria and Iran, where the hijab was a sign of social status. After all, only a woman who need not work in the fields could afford to remain secluded and veiled. ... In the Muslim community "there was no tradition of veiling until around 627 C.E."

==== Case of ridda ====
Traditionally ridda, or converting from Islam to another religion is a capital crime in Islam. Islamists have been noted for their enthusiasm in enforcing the penalty. But like enforcement of hijab wearing, there is question over the scriptural or historical basis of the proscribed sentence of death. According to reformist author Reza Aslan, belief in the death sentence for apostates originated with early Caliph Abu Bakr's "war against tribes that had annulled their oath of allegiance to the Prophet." The war was to "prevent Muhammad's community from dissolving back into the old tribal system," but was a political and not a religious war. "Still, the Riddah Wars did have the regrettable consequence of permanently associating apostasy (denying one's faith) with treason (denying the central authority of the Caliph)," which made apostasy "a capital crime in Islam."

== Extra-Sharia innovations ==
=== Adaptations to modern times ===
Critics have noted that Islamists have claimed to uphold eternal religious/political principles but sometimes change with the times, for example embracing "far more modern and egalitarian" interpretations of social justice – including socialist ideas – than the rightly guided caliphs would ever have conceived of. Islamists in power in the Islamic Republic of Iran, have had to "quietly put aside" traditional Islamic divorce and inheritance law and replace them with statutes addressing "contemporary Iranian social needs," according to Graham Fuller. Another critic, Asghar Schirazi, has followed the progress of changes in divorce law in Iran, starting with the western innovation of court divorce for women – a deviation from traditional Islamic Talaq divorce introduced before the Islamic Revolution. Court divorce went from being denounced by the Ayatollah Khomeini in the 1960s as the product of orders by "agents of foreign powers for the purpose of annihilating Islam," to the law of the land in the Islamic Republic by 1992. Other loosening of prohibitions on previously unIslamic activity in the Islamic Republic include allowing the broadcast of music, and family planning.

=== Emergence of Church-like structures ===
According to Shahrough Akhavi, church-like behavior is found in the Islamic Republic of Iran where the state demand for obedience to the fatawa of supreme cleric Khomeini strongly resembled the doctrine of Papal infallibility of the Roman Catholic Church, and where the demotion of a rival of Khomeini, Ayatollah Mohammad Kazem Shariatmadari (d. 1986), resembled "defrocking" and "excommunicating," despite the fact that "no machinery for this has ever existed in Islam."

Other trends, such as centralized control over budgets, appointments to the professoriate, curricula in the seminaries, the creation of religious militias, monopolizing the representation of interests, and mounting a Kulturkampf in the realm of the arts, the family, and other social issues tell of the growing tendency to create an "Islamic episcopacy" in Iran.

=== Executive monopoly over legislation ===
Traditionally Sharia law was elaborated by independent jurist scholars, had precedence over state interests, and was applied to people rather than territories. "[T]he caliph, though otherwise the absolute chief of the community of Muslims, had not the right to legislate but only to make administrative regulations with the limits laid down by the sacred Law."

Islamists in Iran and Sudan extended the purview of Sharia but gave the state, not independent jurists, authority over it. The most extreme example of this was the Ayatollah Khomeini's declaration in 1988 that "the government is authorized unilaterally to abolish its lawful accords with the people and ... to prevent any matter, be it spiritual or material, that poses a threat to its interests." Which meant that, "for Islam, the requirements of government supersede every tenet, including even those of prayer, fasting and pilgrimage to Mecca." Something not even Atatürk, the most committed Muslim secularist, dared to do.

Traditionally Sharia applied to people rather than territories – Muslims were to obey wherever they were, non-Muslims were exempt. The idea that law was based on jurisdictions – with towns, states, counties each having their own laws – was a European import. "Turabi declares that Islam 'accepts territory as the basis of jurisdiction.' As a result, national differences have emerged. The Libyan government lashes all adulterers. Pakistan lashes unmarried offenders and stones married ones. The Sudan imprisons some and hangs others. Iran has even more punishments, including head shaving and a year's banishment.

Under the new Islamist interpretation, the "millennium-old exclusion" of non-Muslims "from the Sharia is over." Umar Abd ar-Rahman, the blind sheikh, "is adamant on this subject: 'it is very well known that no minority in any country has its own laws.'

=== Importation of Western political concepts ===
One critic has compiled a list of concepts borrowed from the West and alien to the Sharia used in the constitution of Islamic Republic of Iran: 'sovereignty of the people' (hakemiyat-e melli), 'nation' (mellat), 'the rights of the nation' (hoquq-e mellat), 'the legislature' (qovveh-e moqannaneb), 'the judiciary' (qovveh-e qaza'iyeh), 'parliament' (majles), 'republic' (jomhuri), 'consultation of the people' (hameh-porsi), 'elections' (entekhabat).

==== Idea of historical progress ====
Sayyid Qutb adopted the "Marxist notion of stages of history", with the demise of capitalism and its replacement with communism, but then adding yet another stage, the ultimate Islamic triumph. Islam would replace communism after humanity realized communism could not fulfill its spiritual needs, and Islam was "the only candidate for the leadership of humanity."

==== Feminism ====
But in explaining Islam's or Islamism's superiority in its treatment of women, many Islamists take positions unknown to the early Muslims they seek to emulate. Founder of the Muslim Brotherhood, Hasan al-Banna believed "Muslim women have been free and independent for fifteen centuries. Why should we follow the example of Western women, so dependent on their husbands in material matters?" President of the Islamic Republic of Iran Mohammad Khatami boasted that "under the Islamic Republic, women have full rights to participate in social, cultural, and political activities;" as did Islamist Hasan at-Turabi, the former leader of Sudan: "Today in Sudan, women are in the army, in the police, in the ministries, everywhere, on the same footing as men." Turabi explains that "a woman who is not veiled is not the equal of men. She is not looked on as one would look on a man. She is looked at to see if she is beautiful, if she is desirable. When she is veiled, she is considered a human being, not an object of pleasure, not an erotic image."

==== Political philosophy ====
Traditional Islam emphasized man's relation with God and living by Sharia, but not the state "which meant almost nothing to them but trouble ... taxes, conscription, corvée labor." Islamists and revivalists embrace the state, in statements like: Islam "is rich with instructions for ruling a state, running an economy, establishing social links and relationships among the people and instructions for running a family," and "Islam is not precepts or worship, but a system of government."

Rather than comparing their movement against other religions, Islamists are prone to say "We are not socialist, we are not capitalist, we are Islamic."

In his famous 1988 appeal to Gorbachev to replace Communism with Islam, Imam Khomeini talked about the need for a "real belief in God" and the danger of materialism, but said nothing about the five pillars, did not mention Muhammad or monotheism. What he did say was that "nowadays Marxism in its economic and social approaches, is facing a blind alley" and that "the Islamic Republic of Iran can easily supply the solution the believing vacuum of your country". Materialism is mentioned in the context of "materialistic ideology."

== Enmity towards non-Muslims ==
Major Islamist figures such as Sayyid Qutb and Ayatollah Khomeini emphasize antipathy towards non-Muslims and anything un-Islamic. Sayyid Qutb, for example, opposed co-existence with non-Muslims and believed the world was divided into "truth and falsehood" – Islam being truth and everything else being falsehood. "Islam cannot accept or agree to a situation which is half-Islam and half-Jahiliyyah ... The mixing and co-existence of the truth and falsehood is impossible," Western civilization itself was "evil and corrupt," a "rubbish heap."

Olivier Roy explains Islamist attacks on Jews, Christians and other non-Muslims as a need for a scapegoat for failure.

Since Islam has an answer to everything, the troubles from which Muslim society is suffering are due to nonbelievers and to plots, whether Zionist or Christian. Attacks against Jews and Christians appear regularly in neofundamentalist articles. In Egypt, Copts are physically attacked. In Afghanistan, the presence of western humanitarians, who are associated with Christian missionaries [despite the fact that many if not most have secular often leftist backgrounds] is denounced.

=== Verses of the Quran and enmity ===
But whatever the explanation, the sentiments of Qutb and Khomeini seem to clash with what critics (such as Abou al-Fadl, Reza Aslan, Usama Hasan) believe are Quranic calls for moderation and toleration:

'all those who believe – the Jews, the Sabians, the Christians – anyone who believes in Allah and the Last Days, and who does good deeds, will have nothing to fear or regret.' ^{[Quran 5:69]}

'We believe in what has been revealed to us, just as we believe in what has been revealed to you [i.e. Jews and Christians] Our God and Your God are the same; and it is to Him we submit.' ^{[Quran 29:46]}

Another points out ayat endorsing diversity:

'If thy Lord had willed, He would have made humankind into a single nation, but they will not cease to be diverse ... And, for this God created them [humankind]' ^{[Quran 11:118]}

'To each of you God has prescribed a Law and a Way. If God would have willed, He would have made you a single people. But God's purpose is to test you in what He has given each of you, so strive in the pursuit of virtue, and know that you will all return to God [in the Hereafter], and He will resolve all the matters in which you disagree.' ^{[Quran 5:48]}

... and ayat that seem to be at odds with offensive jihad against non-Muslims Qutb and others promote:

"If your enemy inclines towards peace, then you should seek peace and trust in God" ^{[Quran 8:61]}

"... If God would have willed, He would have given the unbelievers power over you [Muslims], and they would have fought you [Muslims], Therefore, if they [the unbelievers] withdraw from you and refuse to fight you, and instead send you guarantees of peace, know that God has not given you a license [to fight them]." ^{[Quran 4:90]}

As Abou al-Fadl says, "these discussions of peace would not make sense if Muslims were in a permanent state of war with nonbelievers, and if nonbelievers were a permanent enemy and always a legitimate target."

=== Sunna and enmity ===
The behavior of the prophet during the 23 years of his ministry makes up Sunnah or model for all Muslims; but it was notably light on bloodletting after conquering Mecca in January 630 CE. While everyone was required to take an oath of allegiance to him and never again wage war against him, he "declared a general amnesty for most of his enemies, including those he had fought in battle. Despite the fact that Islamic law now made the formerly ruling Quraysh tribe his slaves, Muhammad declared all of Mecca's inhabitants (including its slaves) to be free. Only six men and four women were put to death for various crimes, and not one was forced to convert to Islam, though everyone had to take an oath of allegiance never again to wage war against the Prophet."

=== Alleged conspiracies against Islam ===
Khomeini believed "imperialists" – British and then American – had 300-year-long "elaborate plans for assuming control" of the East, the purpose of which was "to keep us backward, to keep us in our present miserable state so they can exploit our riches, our underground wealth, our lands and our human resources. They want us to remain afflicted and wretched, and our poor to be trapped in their misery ... " One complaint by a critic of this approach is that these "conspiracy theor[ies]" revolving around the "ready-to-wear devil" of the West mean that the West is not just malicious but in league with the devil (Shaytan). But if "every failure is the devil's work" then fighting it "is the same as asking God, or the devil himself (which is to say these days the Americans), to solve one's problems"; a situation that Olivier believes is "currently paralyzing Muslim political thought."

=== Interpretation of the Crusades ===
The belief of some, such as Sayyid Qutb, that the Crusades were an attack on Islam, or at least "a wanton and predatory aggression" against Muslim countries from which Muslims developed a rightful mistrust of Christians/Europeans/Westerners, has been called into question.

According to historian Bernard Lewis, the Crusades were indeed religious wars for Christians, but to

recover the lost lands of Christendom and in particular the holy land where Christ had lived, taught and died. In this connection, it may be recalled that when the Crusaders arrived in the Levant not much more than four centuries had passed since the Arab Muslim conquerors had wrested theses lands from Christendom – less than half the time from the Crusades to the present day – and that a substantial proportion of the population of these lands, perhaps even a majority, was still Christian."

The Arab Muslim contemporaries of the Crusaders did not refer to them as "Crusaders or Christians but as Franks or Infidels". Rather than raging at their aggression, Muslims allied with Crusaders and each other against other alliances of Crusaders and Muslims. Rather than being event of such trauma that Muslims developed an old and deep fear of Christians/Europeans/Westerners from it, the crusaders' invasion was just one of many such by barbarians coming from "East and West alike" during this time of "Muslim weakness and division." "With few exceptions, the Muslim historians show little interest in whence or why the Franks had come, and report their arrival and their departure with equal lack of curiosity."

Lewis argues that any traumatization from the Crusades felt by Muslims surely would pale in comparison to what European Christendom felt from Islam. The Crusades started in 1096 and the Crusaders lost their last toe-hold when the city of Acre, was taken less than two hundred years later in 1291, whereas Europe felt under constant threat from Islam, "from the first Moorish landing in Spain [711] to the second Turkish siege of Vienna [1683]."

All but the easternmost provinces of the Islamic realm had been taken from Christian rulers, and the vast majority of the first Muslims west of Iran and Arabia were converts from Christianity. North Africa, Egypt, Syria, even Persian-ruled Iraq had been Christian countries, in which Christianity was older and more deeply rooted than in most of Europe. Their loss was sorely felt and heightened the fear that a similar fate was in store for Europe. In Spain and in Sicily, Muslim faith and Arab culture exercised a powerful attraction, and even those who remained faithful to the Christian religion often adopted the Arabic language."

William Cantwell Smith observes that

until Karl Marx and the rise of communism, the Prophet organized and launched the only serious challenge to Western civilization that it has faced in the whole course of its history ... Islam is the only positive force that has won converts away from Christianity – by the tens of millions ...

=== Division of the Muslim world into multiple states ===
According to the Ayatollah Khomeini and other Islamists, one glaring example of an attempt by the West to weaken the ummah was the partition of the Ottoman Empire, the largest Muslim state and home of the Caliph, into 20 or so "artificially created" separate nations when that empire fell in 1918. Western powers did partition the Arab world (which made up most of the Ottoman Empire) after World War I, while the general Arab Muslim sentiment in much of the 20th Century was for wahda (unity).

In examining the question of whether this was a case of "divide and rule" policy by Western imperialists, international relations scholar Fred Halliday points out there were plenty of other explanations for the continued division:

- rivalries between different Arab rulers and the reluctance of distinct regional populations to share statehood or power with other Arabs;
- rivalries between Saudi Arabia and Yemen in the Peninsula or between Egypt and Syria;
- in the case of the failure of the United Arab Republic and its division in 1961, anger in Syria over Egyptian dominance;
- the difficulty of unifying a large group of states though they share the same language, culture and religion, and the desire to unify, is not unique to the Muslim world; but mirrored in the failure of Latin America to merge in the first decades of the 19th century after the Spanish withdrawal, when "broad aspirations, inspired by Simon Bolivar, for Latin American unity foundered on regional, elite and popular resistance, which ended up yielding, as in the Arab world, around twenty distinct states."

The more general claim that imperialism and colonialism divide in order to rule is, in broad terms, simplistic: the overall record of colonialism has been to merge and unite previously disparate entities, be this in 16th century Ireland, 19th-century India and Sudan or 20th century Libya and Southern Arabia. The British supported the formation of the League of Arab states in 1945 and tried, in the event unsuccessfully, to create united federations first in Southern Arabia (1962–67) and then in the Gulf states (1968–71). As Sami Zubaida has pointed out in his talks, imperialism in fact tends to unite and rule. It is independent states such as India and Pakistan (later Pakistan and Bangladesh), as well as Ireland, Cyprus and indeed, the USSR and Yugoslavia, that promote fragmentation."

While in theory the early Muslim world was united under the Rashidun, Umayyad and Abbasid caliphates, historian Bernard Lewis argues that Islam ceased to be united in "one single world state" after its first century and a half.

=== Antisemitism ===
Islamists, according to Robert S. Wistrich, are the primary force behind 21st century antisemitism.

==== Alleged Jewish conspiracies against Islam ====
Powerful and categorical anti-Jewish statements have been issued by Islamists from the Egyptian Muslim Brotherhood on the moderate end ("Such are the Jews, my brother, Muslim lion cub, your enemies and the enemies of God"), to Osama bin Laden at the extreme ("Jews are masters of usury and leaders in treachery").

Among Islamist opinion makers, both Qutb and Khomeini talked about Jews as both early and innate enemies of Islam. Qutb believed that

At the beginning the enemies of the Muslim community did not fight openly with arms but tried to fight the community in its belief through intrigue, spreading ambiguities, creating suspicions.

And goes on to say, "the Jews are behind materialism, animal sexuality, the destruction of the family and the dissolution of society."

Khomeini mentions the "Jews of Banu Qurayza", who were eliminated by Muhammad, as an example of the sort of "troublesome group" that Islam and the Islamic state must "eliminate." and explains that "from the very beginning, the historical movement of Islam has had to contend with the Jews, for it was they who first established anti-Islamic propaganda and engaged in various stratagems."

Qutb's anti-Judaism has been criticized as obsessive and irrational by Daniel Benjamin and Steven Simon who quote him saying

that 'anyone who leads this community away from its religion and its Quran can only be Jewish agent' – in other words, any source of division, anyone who undermines the relationship between Muslims and their faith is by definition a Jew. The Jews thus become the incarnation of all that is anti-Islamic, and such is their supposed animosity that they will never relent 'because the Jews will be satisfied only with destruction of this religion [Islam].' The struggle with the Jews will be a war without rules, since 'from such creatures who kill, massacre and defame prophets one can only expect the spilling of human blood and dirty means which would further their machinations and evilness.'

==== Alleged Jewish conspiracy against Muhammad ====
But specifically there is the legend of Jews conspired against Muhammad, those Jews being the Banu Qurayza mentioned by Khomeini, a tribe that collaborated with the Quraysh, the Muslims' powerful enemy, and whose men were executed and women and children sold into slavery in 627 AD as punishment.

That this event was the beginning of a Jewish-Muslim struggle is disputed by religious scholar Reza Aslan:

The execution of the Banu Qurayza was not, as it has so often been presented, reflective of an intrinsic religious conflict between Muhammad and the Jews. This theory, which is sometimes presented as an incontestable doctrine... is founded on the belief that Muhammad ... came to Medina fully expecting the Jews to confirm his identity as a prophet ... To his surprise, however the Jews not only rejected him but strenuously argued against the authenticity of the Qur'an as divine revelation. Worried that the rejection of the Jews would somehow discredit his prophetic claims, Muhammad had not choice but to turn violently against them, separate his community from theirs ...

Aslan believes this theory is refuted by historical evidence:

- The Banu Qurayza were not executed for being Jews. Non-Jews were also executed following the Battle of the Trench. "As Michael Lecker has demonstrated, a significant number of the Banu Kilab – Arab clients of the Qurayza who allied with them as an auxiliary force outside Medina – were also executed for treason." Other Jews did not protest or side with the Banu Qurayza, and these Jews were left alone.
- Most Jews were untouched. The 400 to 700 Banu Qurayza men killed were "no more than a tiny fraction of the total population of Jews who resided in Medina" who are estimated to have been between 24,000 and 28,000 These "remained in the oasis living amicably alongside their Muslim neighbors for many years" until they were expelled "under the leadership of Umar near the end of the seventh century C.E." along with all the other non-Muslims "as part of a larger Islamization process throughout the Arabian Peninsula."
- "Scholars almost unanimously agree, the execution of the Banu Qurayza did not in any way set a precedent for future treatment of Jews in Islamic territories. On the contrary, Jews throve under Muslim rule, especially after Islam expanded into Byzantine lands, where Orthodox rulers routinely persecuted both Jews and non-Orthodox Christians for their religious beliefs, often forcing them to convert to Imperial Christianity under penalty of death. In contrast, Muslim law, which provided Jews and Christians 'protected peoples' Dhimmi status, neither required nor encouraged their conversion to Islam. ... In return for a special 'protection tax' called jizyah, Muslim law allowed Jews and Christians both religious autonomy and the opportunity to share in the social and economic institutions ..."

"Finally and most importantly, ... Jewish clans in Medina – themselves Arab converts – were barely distinguishable from their pagan counterparts either culturally or, for that matter, religiously."

- They spoke a language called ratan, and "[t]here is no evidence that they either spoke or understood Hebrew. Indeed, their knowledge of the Hebrew Scripture was likely limited to just a few scrolls of law, some prayer books, and a handful of fragmentary Arabic translations of the Torah – What S. W. Baron refers to as a 'garbled, oral tradition.'"
- They "neither strictly observed Mosaic law, nor seemed to have any real knowledge of the Talmud," nor were Israelites, which, according to J.G. Reissener, precluded them from being considered Jews. A non-Israelites Jew being required to be 'a follower of the Mosaic Law ... in accordance with the principles laid down in the Talmud,' according to the strong consensus of opinion among Diaspora Jewish communities.
- In "their culture, ethnics, and even their religion, Medina's Jews ... were practically identical to Medina's pagan community, with whom they freely interacted and (against Mosaic law) frequently intermarried."
- Archeologists haven't found any "easily identifiable archeological evidence of a significant Jewish presence" at Medina. The usual "indicators – such as the remnants of stone vessels, the ruins of immersion pools (miqva'ot), and the interment of ossuaries – must be present at a site in order to confirm the existence there of an established Jewish religious identity."

=== Hopes for world success and mass conversion ===
The worldwide ambition for both Islam and Islamist systems by Islamist leaders is indicated by Maududi who describes Islam in one of his books as

a comprehensive system which envisages to annihilate all tyrannical and evil systems in the world and enforces its own programme of reform which it deems best for the well-being of mankind.

Mass conversion around the world of non-Muslims to Islam would greatly facilitate enforcing an Islamist program, and according to Olivier Roy, "today's Islamist activists are obsessed with conversion: rumors that Western celebrities or entire groups are converting are hailed enthusiastically by the core militants."

Aside from the complaint that pushing for mass conversion of non-Muslims to a different religion and culture is aggressive and intolerant of their beliefs, Olivier Roy argues "the age of converting entire peoples is past," and it is simply unrealistic in an era where religious belief is considered a personal matter. Likewise, a strategy to gradually convert non-Muslims "until the number of conversions shifts the balance of the society," is also problematic. Converts to Islam "in a Christian environment" are generally "marginalized", "fanatics" or a "true mystics," in any case people who seldom have any desire or ability to join or build "a mass movement."

== Ineffective results ==
Olivier Roy argues that, while Islamism has been wonderfully successful as a "mobilising slogan", it "just does not provide the answers to the problems of governing a modern states." Roy points to Egypt, the largest Arab Muslim country, where in the wake of the Arab Spring, the party of the oldest and largest Islamist movement (the Muslim Brotherhood) was by far the largest vote getter. It won the 2012 presidential election but within a year was overthrown and crushed by the military after millions filled the streets to protest its rule.

Another critic, Abdullahi Ahmed An-Na'im argues that, even in family law, where Islamic jurisprudence provides an abundance of rulings, Sharia law does not provide a clear basis for a centralised administration, because the very idea of centralised administration did not exist at the time when the various schools of Muslim family law were developed.

=== Failure of Islamists in power ===
Examples of the failure of personal virtue and disinterest in "building institutions" capable of handling the corruption of power and human frailty is manifest, (Roy believes), in the Islamic Republic of Iran and mujahideen Afghanistan. In both cases the heroic Islamic self-sacrifice that brought Islamist insurgents to power was followed by notably un-heroic and un-virtuous governance of the victorious warriors "demanding their due" in spoils and corruption, or abandon politics to "climbers, careerists, and unscrupulous businessmen." Islamists were no more successful than "other ideologies", in proving immune to the corruption of power.

In Iran the failure is seen not just in lack of support for Islamist government, but in the decline of the Islamic revival. "Mosques are packed" where Islamists are out of power, but "they empty out when Islamism takes power." In Islamist-ruled Iran, "one almost never sees a person praying in the street." (Note: Iran has "the lowest mosque attendance of any Islamic country," according to Zohreh Soleimani of the BBC. children of the revolution; Iranian clergy have complained that more than 70% of the population do not perform their daily prayers and that less than 2% attend Friday mosques,) Islamic jurists, which form a politically privileged class in Iran "were generally treated with elaborate courtesy" in the early years of the revolution. "'Nowadays, clerics are sometimes insulted by schoolchildren and taxi drivers and they quite often put on normal clothes when venturing outside Qom."

Disillusionment with what he calls the "faltering ideology" can also be found in Sudan, with Necmettin Erbakan in Turkey, or in the Algerian guerilla war.

Writing in 2020, Mustafa Akyol suggests a "Post-Islamist" backlash against Islamism among Muslim youth has come from all the "terrible things" that have happened in the Arab world recently "in the name of Islam" – such as the "sectarian civil wars in Syria, Iraq and Yemen".

In Turkey, the "moderate Islamist" AKP (Justice and Development Party) government of President Tayyip Erdogan has been in power for nearly twenty years and worked assiduously to cultivate a new "pious generation." Yet a report by a local branch Turkey's Ministry of Education recently warned of a "spread of deism among the youth" even in state sponsored religious schools. Although AKP is described as an Islamist party in some media, party officials reject those claims. Turkey continues to be a secular country. (Akyol does not include Erdogan or his AKP party in any post-Islamist configuration.) Akyol quotes religious conservative (Temel Karamollaoglu) who broke with Erdogan government and warns of "an empire of fear, a dictatorship in Turkey by those who claim to represent religion," which is "pushing people away from the religion." Sociologist Mucahit Bilici describes Turkey having undergone an "organic secularization, entirely civic and happening not at the behest of, but in spite of, the state. It is the consequence of a local, indigenous enlightenment, a flowering of post-Islamist sentiment."

In Iran, Akyol quotes Nicolas Pelham saying that from all visible signs in the capital Tehran, the 1979 Iranian Islamic Revolution has not re-Islamized Iranian society as much as the de-Islamized it. Islamic laws to enforce hijab and forbid alcohol all but openly flouted.

In Sudan, following the 2019 Revolution toppling Islamist dictator Omar al-Bashir "security forces found over $350 million in cash" in his residence alone. According to Abdelwahab El-Affendi, Islamism has come "to signify corruption, hypocrisy, cruelty and bad faith" in that country. "Sudan is perhaps the first genuinely anti-Islamist country in popular terms."

Polls taken by Arab Barometer in six Arab countries – Algeria, Egypt, Tunisia, Jordan, Iraq and Libya – found "Arabs are losing faith in religious parties and leaders." In 2018–19, in all six countries, fewer than 20% of those asked whether they trusted Islamist parties answered in the affirmative. That percentage had fallen (in all six countries) from when the same question was asked in 2012–14. Mosque attendance also declined more than 10 points on average, and the share of those Arabs describing themselves as "not religious" went from 8% in 2013 to 13% in 2018–19. In Syria, Sham al-Ali reports "Rising apostasy among Syrian youths".

=== Failure of Islamist policies ===
==== Separation of the sexes ====
Thorough hijab covering for women and separation of the sexes has been advocated by Islamists such as Abul A'la Maududi who argue it prevents men from "being distracted by women" and allow them "to successfully carry out their jobs in society", but critics have complained of the lack of correlation between separation and respect for women. In the country with perhaps the strictest policy of separation of the sexes (Saudi Arabia), one disillusioned Islamist (Ed Husain) who worked as an English teacher was startled at the attitude of Saudi Arabian men towards women. Husain complained that despite the strict Saudi policy separation of the sexes that he wished to emulate as an Islamist, he heard harrowing stories of kidnapping of women and encountered downloading of hard core pornography by his students that he never encountered in Britain or the more "secular" Syrian Republic where he also taught. Despite his wife's modest dress

out of respect for local custom, she wore the long black abaya and covered her hair in a black scarf. In all the years I had known my wife, never had I seen her appear so dull ... Yet on two occasions she was accosted by passing Saudi youths from their cars. ... In supermarkets I only had to be away from Faye for five minutes and Saudi men would hiss or whisper obscenities as they walked past. When Faye discussed their experiences with local women at the British Council they said, 'Welcome to Saudi Arabia'.

Had I not reached Saudi Arabia utterly convinced of my own faith and identity, then I might well have lost both. Wahhabism and its rigidity could easily have repelled me from Islam.

== Comparisons to fascist ideology ==
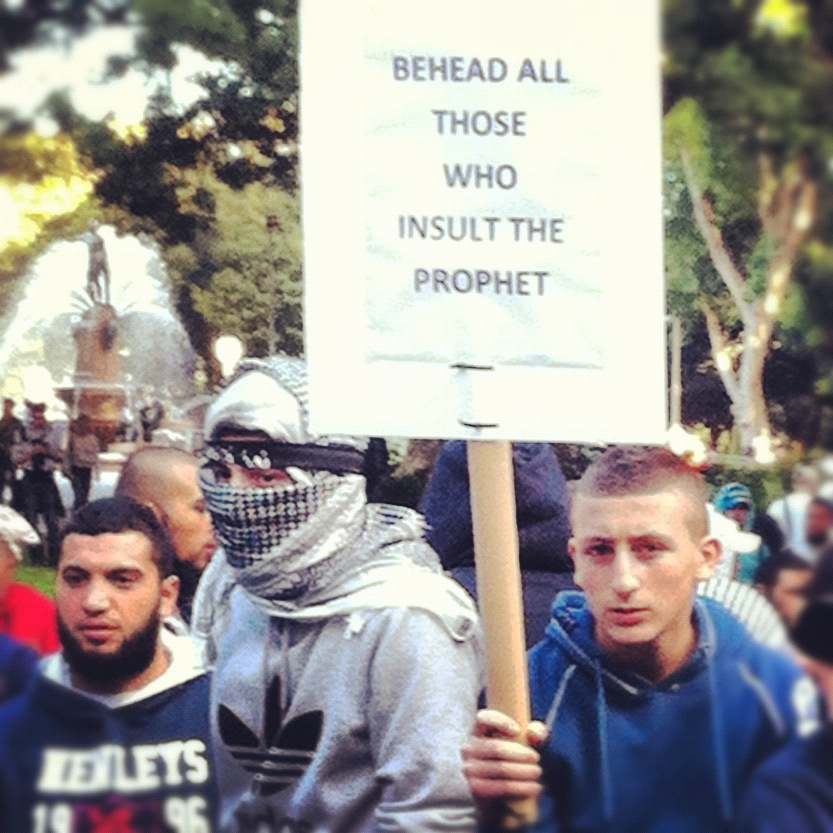
Islamist protest in Sydney

Writers such as Stephen Suleyman Schwartz and Christopher Hitchens, find some elements of Islamism fascistic. Malise Ruthven, a Scottish writer and historian who writes on religion and Islamic affairs, opposes redefining Islamism as "Islamofascism", but also finds the resemblances between the two ideologies "compelling".

French philosopher Alexandre del Valle compared Islamism with fascism and communism in his Red-green-brown alliance theory.

== See also ==
- Islamist terrorism
- Liberal movements within Islam
- Muslim Brotherhood
- Takfir
- War against Islam

=== Books & organisations ===
- The Islamist
