= Claude Griscelli =

French doctor and immunologist (1936–2026)

Member of the Conseil d'État
- In office 11 December 2000 – 7 May 2026

President of Inserm
- In office 24 July 1996 – 15 February 2001
- Preceded by: Philippe Lazar
- Succeeded by: Christian Bréchot

Personal details
- Born: 2 March 1936 Rabat, French protectorate in Morocco
- Died: 7 May 2026 (aged 90) Morocco
- Education: Lycée Descartes; University of Paris Faculty of Medicine
- Occupation: Doctor; Immunologist

Claude Griscelli (French: [klˈod ɡʁisɛlˈi]; 2 March 1936 – 7 May 2026) was a French doctor and immunologist.

== Life and career ==
Born in Rabat on 2 March 1936, Griscelli grew up in a Corsican family and attended the Lycée Gouraud and the University of Paris Faculty of Medicine. He began researching for Inserm at the Hôpital Saint-Louis in Paris before a stint in the United States with the National Institutes of Health. He returned to France in 1968 and became chief clinician of pediatrics at Necker–Enfants Malades Hospital. There, he established a research laboratory to continue work he had begun in the United States. From 1978 to 1992, he directed Inserm's Research Unit in Pediatric Immunology and Rheumatology. He served as president of Inserm from 1996 to 2001, where he notably created the institute's ethics committee.

In 2007, Griscelli founded the Institut des maladies génétiques Imagine, which studied genetic diseases at Necker Hospital. The institute became part of the French government initiative Investissements d'avenir, or future investments. Under his leadership, the institute created a team of over 450 doctors, researchers, and technicians. He oversaw an advisory board composed of several highly-distinguished scientists. In 2011, he was implicated in the Mediator affair, in which a diabetes and diet pill sold by Laboratoires Servier under the name Mediator, was found to have caused fatal heart valve damage, causing between 500 and 2000 deaths, and was thereafter covered up. He was accused of attempting to downplay his laboratory's liability in the scandal, but was ultimately acquitted on 29 March 2021. However, he was removed from the Conseil national de l'Ordre des médecins on 29 December 2023. His removal was in connection to his numerous attempts to downplay his contractual, paid relationship with Servier since 2001. In spite of this, he was still named a Grand Officer of the Legion of Honour in 2021.

Griscelli died in Morocco on 7 May 2026, at the age of 90.
