= Patrizia Paterlini-Bréchot =

Italian scientist

idant Patrizia Paterlini-Bréchot, born in the Italian city of Reggio Emilia, is an Italian scientist and a professor of cell biology and oncology working at the Faculté de Médecine Necker-Enfants Malades, Université Paris Descartes and at INSERM in Paris.

== Education ==
Patrizia Paterlini-Bréchot studied medicine at the University of Modena and Reggio Emilia, Italy. In 1978, she defended a thesis on Hodgkin's Lymphoma, which was awarded the title of « Best medical thesis » of the year 1978. She pursued her training and validated a double specialization in Hematology (1981), awarded the prize of « Best research in Hematology » of the year 1979, and in Oncology (1984). Patrizia Paterlini-Bréchot obtained a permanent academic position in the University of L'Aquila (1981), then Bologna (1984) working in the departments of Hematology, Gastroenterology and Oncology. In 1988 she moved to Paris (France) for a training in molecular biology in professor Christian Bréchot's laboratory. In 1993, she defended her PhD thesis, Fundamental bases of oncogenesis at University of Paris XI. She quit her academic position in the University of Bologna in 1993 and in 1994 she obtained an equivalent position in Paris Descartes University in Paris.

== Research ==
In 1994, she demonstrated the clinical impact of a new marker of cell proliferation, cyclin A, discovered in the same laboratory. In 1995, she was awarded the Prize of Scientific excellence Assistance Publique – Hôpitaux de Paris. Her work in Christian Brechot's team demonstrated the pro-carcinogenic impact of hepatitis B Virus (HBV) genome integration into cellular DNA both in patients having serological markers of HBV infection and in patients lacking serological markers but having persistence of the HBV DNA in their liver. The work of her team thus demonstrated a mechanism involved in the direct tumorigenic effect of this virus. In 2004 she was appointed full professor of cell biology in the same university. With her team, she published studies showing the primary role of calcium signalling deregulation in HBV and Hepatitis C virus (HCV) – related liver oncogenesis and in pathologies related to ER stress. From 2002 to 2006 she served as interim Director of INSERM Unit 370, previously directed by professor Christian Bréchot. In 2006, she was appointed Director of INSERM Unit 807. In addition to fundamental research studies, her activity has been focused to clinically applied research, targeting the domains of predictive oncology and non-invasive prenatal diagnosis.

=== The ISET technique ===
The work of Patrizia Paterlini-Bréchot led to the discovery of the ISET test permitting the isolation and characterization of both circulating tumor and fetal cells. This discovery led Patrizia Paterlini-Bréchot to found her own company named Rarecells Diagnostics to develop the ISET technique.

== Major publications ==
- P. Paterlini, M. Coppo, Metodologia diagnostica, Piccin Publishing, Padova, Italy, 1987.

== Articles ==
1. Paterlini P., E. Manzini, P. Neri, U. Torelli : The Castleman lymphopathy : cytochemical and immunocytochemical analysis of ten cases. In Haematologica, 60, 123–132, 1979.
2. Mauri C, Paterlini P : Histological and immunohistochemical characterization of lymphomatous extranodal localizations. In Haematologica, 63, 344–356, 1980.
3. Ponz de Leon, P. Paterlini, A. Caroleo, N. Carulli : Serum cholesterol levels and lipoprotein cholesterol in liver cirrhosis. Ital. J. Gastroenterol., 13, 167–171, 1981.
4. P Paterlini, D. Quaglino, A. de Pasquale, G. Cretara, L. Venturoni : Chronic lymphocytic leukaemia associated to multiple myeloma. In Haematologica, 67, 576–588, 1982.
5. De Pasquale, P. Paterlini, M. Ricciotti, D. Quaglino : Cytoenzymatic staining patterns of malignant lymphoid T cells. In Basic and Applied Histochemistry. Suppl. 26, 133–136,1982.
6. De Pasquale, P. Paterlini, D. Quaglino : Immunochemical demonstration of different antigens in single cells in paraffin-embedded histological sections. In Clin. Lab. Haemat. 4, 267–270, 1982.
7. P Paterlini, M. Ricciotti, G. Cretara, E. D'Allessandro, A Franchi, D. Quaglino : Cytobiological studies and pathogenetic speculations in an atypical case of Sézary syndrome. In Haematologica, 68, 581–590, 1983.
8. De Pasquale, P Paterlini, Daniela Quaglino, D. Quaglino : Emperipolesis of granulocytes within megakaryocytes. Br. J. Haematol., 60, 384–386, 1985.
9. P Paterlini, L. Venturoni, G. Cretara, M. Ricciotti, D. Quagliano : Bone marrow necrosis : an unusual presenting feature of small cell lung carcinoma. In Tumori, 71, 403–406, 1985.
10. De Pasquale, P. Paterlini, A. Di Francesco, L. Vecchio, D. Quaglino : Follicular lymphomas with predominant splenic involvement : report of two cases. In Tumori, 72, 109–115, 1986.
11. De Pasquale, L. Venturoni, P. Paterlini, G. Cretara, A. Di Francesco, D. Quaglino : Possible usefulness of ticlopidine in combined treatment of thrombotic thrombocytopenic purpura. In Haematologica, 71, 53–55, 1986.
12. P Paterlini, E. D'Alessandro, L. Menaguale, M.L. Lo Re, G. Del Porto, D. Quaglino : Unusual interstitial deletion of 8q12 band in a case of acute monocytic leukaemia. In A critical region in haematological malignancies. Tumori, 73, 437–443, 1987.
13. Paterlini, E. Pisi : Oncologic news : the oncogenes, Il Fegato 32, 213–231, 1986.
14. D'Alessandro, P. Paterlini, ML Lo Re, M. Di Cola, C. Ligas, D. Quaglino, G. Del Porto, Cytogenetic follow up in a case of Sézary Syndrome. In Cancer Genet. Cytogenet. , 45, 231–236, 1990.
15. Paterlini P., Gerken G., Nakajima E., Terré S., D'Errico A., Grigioni W., Nalpas B., Wands J., Kew M., Pisi E., Tiollais P., Bréchot C., Polymerase chain reaction for detection of hepatitis B virus DNA and RNA sequences in hepatitis B surface antigen negative patients with primary liver cancer : a study in high and low endemic areas. In N. Engl. J. Med. 323, 80–85, 1990.
16. Paterlini P., Lallement-Le Coeur S., Lallement M., Pelé P.M., Dazza M.C., Terré S., Moncany M., Jourdain G., Courgnaud V., N'Zingoula S., Larouzé B., Griscelli C., Bréchot C., Polymerase chain reaction for studies of mother to child transmission of HIV1, in Africa. J. Med. Virol. 30, 53–57, 1990.
17. Paterlini P., Gerken G., Khemeny F., Franco D., D'Errico A., Grigioni W., Wands J., Kew M., Pisi E., Tiollais P., Bréchot C., Primary liver cancer in hepatitis B surface antigen negative patients : a study of hepatitis B virus genome using polymerase chain reaction. In : Viral hepatitis and liver disease. Hollinger FB., Lemon, SM., Margolis, H Eds, Williams and Wilkins, pp. 605–610, 1990.
18. Kremsdorf D., Thiers V., Garreau F., Tran A., Paterlini P., Gerken, G., Nalpas B., Bréchot C., Variabilité génétique du virus de l'hépatite B et son expression sérologique. In Médecine et Sciences 6, 108–116, 1990.
19. Gerken G., Paterlini P., Manns M., Housset C., Terré S., Dierres H.P. Hess G., Gerlich W.H., Berthelot P., Meyer Zum Buschenfelde K.H., Bréchot C., Polymerase chain reaction (PCR) assay for the evaluation of hepatitis B virus (HBV) viremia in chronic HBV carriers : validation and relation to pre-S and S encoded viral surface proteins. In Hepatology, 13, 158–166, 1991.
20. Paterlini P., Bréchot C., Hepatitis B virus (HBV) and HBsAg negative primary liver cancer. In Digestive Disease and Science, 36, 1122–1129, 1991.
21. Dazza MC, Meneses L.V., Girard PM, Paterlini, P., Villaroel, C., Bréchot C., Larouzé, B., Polymerase chain reaction for detection of hepatitis B virus DNA in HBsAg seronegative patients with hepatocellular carcinoma from Mozambique. Ann. Tropic. Med. and Parasitol., 85, 277–279, 1991.
22. Paterlini, P., De Mitri, S., Martin, C., Munnich, A., Bréchot, C., A TaqI polymorphism in the human cyclin A gene. In Nucleic Acids Research 19, 2516, 1991.
23. Bréchot, C. Kremsdorf, D., Paterlini, P., Thiers, V., Hepatitis B virus DNA in HBsAg negative patients : molecular characterization and clinical implications. J. Hepatol. 13 (suppl.4) : 549–555, 1991.
24. Paterlini, P., Driss, F., Nalpas, B., Pisi, E., Franco, D., Berthelot, P., Bréchot, C., Persistence of hepatitis B and hepatitis C viral genomes in primary liver cancers from hepatitis B surface antigen-negative paytients : a study based on PCR. In Hepatology, 17: 20–29, 1993.
25. De Mitri, S., Pisi, E. Bréchot, C., Paterlini, P., Low frequency of allelic loss in the cyclin A gene in human hepatocellular carcinomas : a study based on PCR. Liver, 13: 259–261, 1993.
26. Paterlini, P., Suberville AM, Zindy, F., Melle J., Sonnier M., Marie J.P., Dreyfus F., Bréchot, Cyclin A expression in human hematological malignancies : a new marker of cell proliferation. Cancer Res., 53: 235–238, 1993.
27. Debuire, B., Paterlini, P., Pontisso, P., Bréchot, C., May, P., May, E., Low rate of p53 mutations in European hepatocellular carcinomas and hepatoblastomas. Oncogene, 8: 2303–2306, 1993.
28. Lamas, E., Zindy, F., Sobczack, J., Paterlini, P., Wang, J., Chenivesse, X., Henglein B., Bréchot, C. Cycline A et cancer. In Médecine et Science, 9: 676–683, 1993.
29. Buendia, M.A., Paterlini, P., Tiollais, P., Bréchot, C., Hepatocellular carcinoma: molecular aspects. In: Viral Hepatitis. Scientific Basis and Clinical Management. Zuckerman A.J., Thomas H.C. Eds., Churchill Livingstone. pp137–164, 1993.
30. Paterlini P. and Bréchot C., Hepatitis B Virus and Primary Livcer Cancer in Hepatitis B Surface Antigen-Positive and -Negative Patients. In: Liver Cancer: Etiological and Progression Factors. Bréchot C. Ed. CRC Press. pp. 167–190, 1994.
31. Esposito, N., Paterlini, P., Kelly, P., Finidori, J. Expression of two isoforms of the Human Growth Hormone receptor in normal liver and Hepatocarcinoma. In Molecular and Cellular Endocrinology. 103: 13–20, 1994.
32. Paterlini, P., Poussin, K., D'Errico, A., De Mitri, M.S., Kew, M., Grigioni, W., Franco, D., Bréchot, C. Rate of Persistence, Structure, and Expression of HBV Genome in HCC Developing in HBsAg-negative Patients. In: Viral Hepatitis and Liver Diseases. Nishioka, K., Suzuki, H., Mishiro, S., Oda, T., Eds., Springer-Verlag, Tokyo, 757–762, 1994.
33. Paterlini, P., Poussin K., Kew, M., Franco, D., Bréchot, C. Selective accumulation of the X transcript of Hepatitis B virus in patients negative for Hepatitis B Surface antigen with Hepatocellular Carcinoma. In Hepatology, 21: 313–321, 1995.
34. Paterlini, P., Flejou, J-F., De Mitri, M.S., Pisi, E., Franco, D., Bréchot, C. Structure and expression of the Cyclin A gene in Human Primary Liver Cancer. Correlation with Flow Cytometric parameters. J. Hepatol., 23: 47–52, 1995.
35. De Mitri, M.S., Poussin, K., Baccarini, P., D'Errico, A., Grigioni, W., Pisi, E., Bréchot, C., Paterlini, P. HCV-associated liver cancer without cirrhosis. In The Lancet, 345: 413–416, 1995.
36. Nousbaum, J.B., Pol, S., Nalpas, B., Gigou, M., Thiers, V., Okamoto, H., Féray, C., Poussin, K., Paterlini, P., Landais, P., Rumi, M., Colombo, M., Mishiro, S., Wilber, J., Berthelot, P., Bréchot, C. Hepatitis C virus type 1b (II) infection in France and Italy. Ann. Int. Med., 122: 161–168, 1995.
37. Bourdon J.C., D'Errico A., Paterlini P., Grigioni W., May E., Debuire B. p53 protein accumulation in European hepatocellular carcinoma is not always dependent on p53 gene mutation. Gastroenterology, 108: 1176–1182, 1995.
38. Delmer A, Tang R, Senamaud-Beaufort C, Paterlini P, Bréchot C, Zittoun R. Alterations of cyclin kinase 4 inhibitor (p16 INK4A/ MTS1) gene structure and expression in acute lymphoblastic leukemias. Leukemia 9: 1240–1245, 1995.
39. Didier JM, Mougin C, Paterlini P, Kantelip JP, Bréchot C, Lab M Détection des ARNm de la cycline A dans les lésions intraépithéliales du tractus anogénital induites par le papillomavirus. C. R. Soc. Biol. 189: 11–126, 1995.
40. Minami M, Possin K, Bréchot C, Paterlini P. A novel PCR technique using Alu specific primers to identify unknown flanking sequences from the human genome. Genomics 29: 403–408, 1995.
41. Bréchot C, Minami M, De Mitri S, Paterlini P. Hepatitis B and C viruses in Hepatitis B Surface antigen negative hepatocellular carcinoma patients. HBV and HCV and Hepatocellular Carcinoma, Princeton Scientific Publishing, 1995.
42. Minami M, Poussin K, Kew M, Okanoue T, Bréchot C, Paterlini P. Precore/Core mutations of Hepatitis B virus in hepatocellular carcinomas developed on noncirrhotic livers. Gastroenterology 111: 691–700, 1996.
43. Louha M, Poussin K, Ganne N, Zylberberg H, Nalpas B, Nicolet J, Capron F, Soubrane O, Vons C, Pol S, Beaugrand M, Berthelot P, Franco D, Trinchet JC, Bréchot C, Paterlini P. Spontaneous and iatrogenic spreading of liver-derived cells into peripheral blood of patients with primary liver cancer. Hepatology 26: 998–1005, 1997.
44. Paterlini P, Ferrandis E, Mejean A, Emile JF, Tournebize M, Poussin K, Lellouch A, Groult R, Bréchot C, Lacour B. Evaluation of cell proliferation through a Polymerase Chain Reaction-based Cyclin A test. Analytical Biochemistry 253: 140–142, 1997.
45. Bellet D, Lazar V, Bièche I, Paradis V, Giovangrandi Y, Paterlini P, Lidereau R, Bedossa P, Bidart JM, Vidaud M. Malignant transformation of nontrophoblastic cells is associated with the expression of chorionic gonadotropin beta genes normally transcribed in trophoblestic cells. Cancer Res. 57: 516–523, 1997.
46. Le Feuvre C, Tahlil O, Paterlini P, Maillard L, Brousse N, Lacour B, Guettier C, Vacheron A, Feldman L, Steg PG. Arterial response to mild balloon injury in the normal rabbit: evidence for low proliferation rate in the adventitia. Coronary Artery Dis 9: 805–814, 1998.
47. Paterlini P: Clinical implications of spontaneous and iatrogenic spreading of tumorous cells in patients with liver cancer. C.R. Soc. Biol. 192: 283–288, 1998.
48. Sirma H, Giannini C, Poussin K, Paterlini P, Kremsdorf D, Bréchot C. Wild type hepatitis B virus X protein, but not a mutant isolated from HCC tumor cells induces G1/ growth arrest and subsequent active cell death. Falk Symposium, 1998.
49. Poussin K, Dienes H, Sirma H, Urban S, Beaugrand M, Franco D, Schirmacher P, Bréchot C, Paterlini-Bréchot P. Expression of mutated hepatitis B virus X genes in human hepatocellular carcinomas. Int J Cancer 80: 497–505, 1999.
50. Louha, M., Nicolet, J., Zylberberg, H., Sabile, A., Vons, C., Vona, G., Poussin, K., Tournebize, M., Capron, F., Pol, S., Franco, D., Lacour, B., Bréchot, C., and Paterlini-Bréchot, P. Liver resection and needle liver biopsy cause hematogenous dissemination of liver cells. , Hepatology 29: 879–882, 1999.
51. Sabile, A., Louha, M., Bonte, E., Poussin, K., Vona, G., Mejean, A., Chretien, Y., L., B., Lacour, B., Capron, F., Roseto, A., Bréchot, C., and Paterlini-Bréchot, P. Efficiency of Ber-EP4 antibody in isolating circulating epithelial tumor cells before RT-PCR detection, Am J Clin Pathol, 112 : 171–178, 1999.
52. Sirma H, Giannini C, Paterlini P, Kremsdorf D, Bréchot C. Hepatitis B Virus (HBx) mutants present in Hepatocellular Carcinomas tissues abrogate the antiproliferative and transactivation effects of Hbx. Oncogene, 18 : 4848–4859, 1999.
53. Mejean, A., Vona, G., Nalpas, B., Damotte, D., Tournebize, M., Brousse, N., Chretien, Y., Dufour, B., Lacour, B., Bréchot, C., and Paterlini-Bréchot, P. Detection of circulating prostate-derived cells in patients with prostate adenocarcinoma through an optimized RT-PCR procedure is an independent risk factor for tumor recurrence., J Urol, 163: 2022–2029, 2000.
54. Bonura C, Paterlini-Bréchot P, Bréchot C. Structure and expression of Tg737, a putative tumor suppressor gene, in human hepatocellular carcinomas. Hepatology, 30 : 677–681, 1999.
55. Vona, G., A, S., Louha, M., Sitruk, V., Schütze, K., Capron, F., Franco, D., Lacour, B., Pazzagli, M., Bréchot, C., and Paterlini-Bréchot, P. ISET, Isolation by Size of Epithelial Tumor cells: a new method for isolation, immunomorphological and molecular characteriziation of circulating tumor cells. Am J Pathol, 156 : 1–7, 2000.
56. M. Chami, D. Gozuacik, K. Saigo, K. Poussin, T. Capiod, P Falson, T. Urashima, K. Isono, M le Maire, J. Beckmann, M. Claret, C. Bréchot, P. Paterlini-Bréchot. Hepatitis B virus-related mutagenesis of SERCA 1 gene in tumor liver cells: evidence for SERCA1 implication in human carcinogenesis. Oncogene, 19: 2877–2886, 2000.
57. C. Bréchot, D. Gozuacik, Y. Murakami, P. Paterlini-Bréchot. Molecular bases for the development of hepatitis B virus (HBV)-related hepatocellular carcinoma (HCC) . Seminars in Cancer Biology, 10 : 211–231, 2000.
58. P. Paterlini-Bréchot, G. Vona, C. Bréchot. Circulating tumorous cells in patients with hepatocellular carcinoma. Clinical impact and future directions. Seminars in Cancer Biology, 10 : 241–249, 2000.
59. M. Chami, D. D. Gozuacik, D. lagorce, M. Brini, P. Falson, G. Peaucellier, P. Pinton, H. Lecoeur, M. Le Maire, R. Rizzuto, C. Bréchot, P. Paterlini-Bréchot. SERCA1 splice variants unable to pump calcium reduce the ER calcium concentration and induce apoptosis. J Cell Biol, 153: 1301–1313, 2001.
60. Tu H, Bonura C, Giannini C, Mouly H, Soussan P, Kew M, Paterlini-Brechot P, Brechot C, Kremsdorf D. Biological impact of natural C-terminal deletions of Hepatitis B Virus X protein in hepatocellular carcinoma tissues. Cancer Research. 61 : 7803–7810, 2001.
61. D. Gozuacik, Y. Murakami, K. Saigo, M. Chami, T. Okanoue, T. Urashima, C. Bréchot, P. Paterlini-Bréchot. Identification of human cancer related genes by naturally occurring Hepatitis B virus DNA tagging. Oncogene 20: 6233–6240, 2001.
62. G. Vona, C. Béroud, A. Benachi, A. Quenette, J.P. Bonnefont, Y. Dumez, B. Lacour, P. Paterlini-Bréchot. Enrichment and genetic analyses of fetal cells circulating in the maternal blood by the ISET technique and single cell microdissection: a non-invasive tool for early prenatal diagnosis. Am. J. Pathol., 160 : 51–58, 2002.
63. Devrim Gozuacik, Mounia Chami, Yoshiki Murakami, Jamila Faivre, David Lagorce, Olivier Poch, Esther Biermann, Rolf Knippers, Christian Bréchot, Patrizia Paterlini-Bréchot. Identification and functional characterization of a new member of the human Mcm protein family: hMcm8. Nucleic Acids Res. 31: 570–579, 2003.
64. Paterlini-Brechot P, Saigo K, Murakami Y, Chami M, Gozuacik D, Mugnier C, Lagorce D, Brechot C. Hepatitis B virus-related insertional mutagenesis occurs frequently in human liver cancers and recurrently targets human telomerase gene. Oncogene. 22:3911-6, 2003.
65. Christophe Béroud, Marc Karliova, Jean Paul Bonnefont, Alexandra Benachi, Arnold Munnich, Yves Dumez, Bernard Lacour, Patrizia Paterlini-Brechot. Prenatal diagnosis of Spinal Muscular Atrophy (SMA) by genetic analysis of circulating fetal cells, The Lancet 361:1013-4, 2003.
66. Mounia Chami, Davide Ferrari, Pierluigi Nicotera, Patrizia Paterlini-Bréchot, Rosario Rizzuto. Caspase-dependent alterations of Ca2+ signaling in the induction of apoptosis by Hepatitis B virus X protein. J Biol Chem. 278 : 31745–31755, 2003.
67. Giovanna Vona, Laurence Estepa, Christophe Béroud, Diane Damotte, Frédérique Capron, Alexandra Mineur, Dominique Franco, Bernard Lacour, Stanislas Pol, Christian Bréchot, Patrizia Paterlini-Bréchot. Impact of cytomorphological and molecular characterization of circulating tumor cells in patients with Primary Liver Cancer. Hepatology, 39 : 792–797, 2004.
68. Murakami Y, Saigo K, Takashima H, Minami M, Okanoue T, Bréchot C, Paterlini-Bréchot P. Large scaled analysis of Hepatitis B Virus (HBV) DNA integration in HBV related hepatocellular carcinomas. Gut 54:1162-8, 2005.
69. Naoual Linda Benali-Furet, Francesca De Giorgi, Mounia Chami, Ludivine Houel, François Ichas, Gabriel Perlemuter, David Lagorce, Rosario Rizzuto, Christian Bréchot, Patrizia Paterlini-Bréchot. Hepatitis C Virus core protein-induced apoptosis is triggered by ER stress and deregulation of calcium signaling, Oncogene, 31 : 4921–4933, 2005.
70. Benali-Furet NL, Chami M, De Giorgi F, Houel L, Vernejoul F, Ichas F, Harper F, Lagorce D, Buscail L, Bartenschlager R, Rizzuto R, Paterlini-Bréchot P. Hepatitis C Virus core protein-induced apoptosis is triggered by ER stress and deregulation of calcium signaling. Oncogene 24:4921-33, 2005.
71. Chami M, Oules B, Paterlini-Bréchot P. Cytobiological consequences of calcium-signaling alterations induced by human viral proteins. Biochim Biophys Acta (Mol Cell Res) 1763:1344–62, 2006.
72. Kremsdorf D, Soussan P, Paterlini-Bréchot P, Bréchot C. Hepatitis B virus-related hepatocellular carcinoma : Paradigms for viral-related human carcinogenesis. Oncogene., 26:3823-33, 2006.
73. Chami M, Benali-Furet NL, Bréchot C, Paterlini-Bréchot P. Impact of calcium signaling in liver carcinogenesis, Med Sci (Paris), 23:133-5, 2007.
74. Saker A, Benachi A, Bonnefont JP, Munnich A, Dumez Y, Lacour B, Paterlini-Bréchot P. Genetic characterization of circulating fetal cells allows non-invasive prenatal diagnosis of cystic fibrosis, Prenat Diagn, 26: 906–916, 2006.
75. Paterlini-Bréchot P. Non invasive prenatal diagnosis of trisomy 21 : dream or reality ?, Med Sci (Paris), 23:592-4, 2007.
76. Paterlini-Bréchot P, Benali-Furet NL. Circulating tumor cells (CTC) detection : Clinical impact and future directions. Cancer Letter, 253 : 180–204, 2007.
77. Tufi R, Panaretakis T, Bianchi K, Criollo A, Fazi B, Di Sano F, Tesniere A, Kepp O, Paterlini-Bréchot P, Zitvogel L, Piacentini M, Szabadkai G, Kroemer G., Reduction of endoplasmic reticulum Ca2+ levels favors plasma membrane surface exposure of calreticulin. Cell Death Differ. 15:274-82, 2008.
78. Tasdemir E, Maiuri MC, Galluzzi L, Vitale I, Djavaheri-Mergny M, D'Amelio M, Criollo A, Morselli E, Zhu C, Harper F, Nannmark U, Samara C, Pinton P, Vicencio JM, Carnuccio R, Moll UM, Madeo F, Paterlini-Bréchot P, Rizzuto R, Szabadkai G, Pierron G, Blomgren K, Tavernarakis N, Codogno P, Cecconi F, Kroemer G., Regulation of autophagy by cytoplasmic p53. Nat. Cell Biol. 10:676-87, 2008.
79. Chami M, Oulès B, Szabadkai G, Tacine R, Rizzuto R and Paterlini-Bréchot P. Role of SERCA1 truncated isoform in the proapoptotic calcium transfer from ER to mitochondria during ER stress. Mol Cell, 32: 641–651, 2008.
80. MBaya E, Oulès B, Caspersen C, Tacine R, Munnich A, Rötig A, Rizzuto R, Rutter GA, Paterlini-Bréchot P, Chami M.,Regulation of calcium signalling-dependent bioenergetics in mitochondrial respiratory chain complex II deficiency, Cell Death and Differentiation, 2010.
81. Fetouchi R, Chami M, Oulès B, Benali-Furet NL, Wychowski C, Paterlini-Bréchot P, Impact of modulation of endoplasmic reticulum (ER) calcium signalling on hepatitis C Virus (HCV) expression and replication, (soumis pour publication).
82. Paterlini-Bréchot P, Mouawia H, Jaïs JP, Bonnefont JP, Benachi A, Jaïs JP, Bussières L, Saker A, Lacour B, Frydman R Clinical validation of a non-invasive strategy for prenatal diagnosis of Spinal Muscular Atrophy (SMA) and Cystic Fibrosis (CF) , (soumis pour publication).
