= Philippe Lazar =

French statistician and epidemiologist (1936–2026)

President of the Research Institute for Development
- In office 11 September 1997 – 21 April 2001
- Preceded by: Hubert Fournier
- Succeeded by: Jean-François Girard

President of Inserm
- In office 1982–1996
- Preceded by: Philippe Laudat
- Succeeded by: Claude Griscelli

Personal details
- Born: 21 April 1936 Paris, France
- Died: 1 May 2026 (aged 90) Paris, France
- Education: École polytechnique
- Occupation: Statistician, epidemiologist

Philippe Lazar (French: [filˈip lazˈaʁ]; 21 April 1936 – 1 May 2026) was a French statistician and epidemiologist.

Lazar won the Concours général in Latin composition in 1952 before graduating from the École polytechnique in 1956. He began a long career in research and statistics and was a founding member of the Comité consultatif national d'éthique. From 1982 to 1996, he was president of Inserm and served as president of the Research Institute for Development from 1997 to 2000. After his retirement, he served as an honorary member of the Association pour le droit de mourir dans la dignité.

Lazar died in Paris on 1 May 2026, at the age of 90.

== Works ==
- Quatre ouvrages de méthodologie statistique
- Les Explorateurs de la santé, voyage au centre de la recherche médicale (1989)
- Pathologie industrielle: Approche épidémiologique (1992)
- L'Éthique biomédicale en question (1996)
- La République a-t-elle besoin de savants ? (1998)
- Autrement dit laïque (2004)
- Court traité de l'âme (2008)
