= Jean Bernard (physician) =

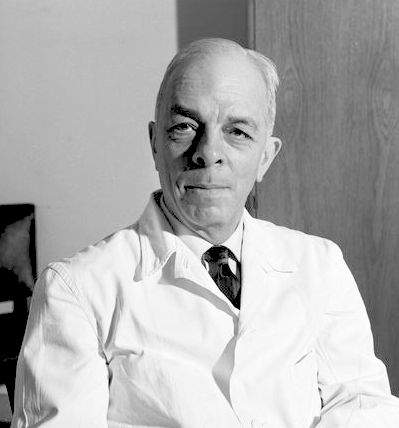
- Jean Bernard in 1963 (Studio Harcourt)
- Born: 26 May 1907; Paris, France
- Died: 17 April 2006 (aged 98); Paris, France
- Scientific career
- Fields: physician haematologist
- Workplaces: Pasteur Institute

Jean Bernard (26 May 1907 – 17 April 2006) was a French physician and haematologist. During his life, he served as president of the French Academy of Sciences and the French National Academy of Medicine. He was also the first president of the National Ethics Advisory Committee. Bernard was a professor of haematology and director of the Institute for Leukaemia at the University of Paris.

After graduating in medicine in Paris in 1926, Bernard commenced his laboratory training with the bacteriologist Gaston Ramon at the Pasteur Institute in 1929.

In 1932 Bernard gave the first description of the use of high dosage radiotherapy in the treatment of Hodgkin's disease. Bernard's research has ranged from the demonstration of neoplastic nature of leukaemia (1933–1937) to the formulation of methods of treatment. Together with Jean-Pierre Soulier, Bernard described the first published case of Bernard–Soulier syndrome. In all, Bernard published 14 textbooks and monographs on haematology.

During the German occupation of France, Bernard was active in the French Resistance.

In 1973, he became a member of the National Academy of Medicine; he was elected at the Académie française on 18 March 1976.

In 1981 he was elected as a member of Serbian Academy of Sciences and Arts in the Department of Medical Sciences. In 1983, he was awarded the Artois-Baillet Latour Health Prize.
