= Jean-Pierre Mignard =

French lawyer and author (born 1951)

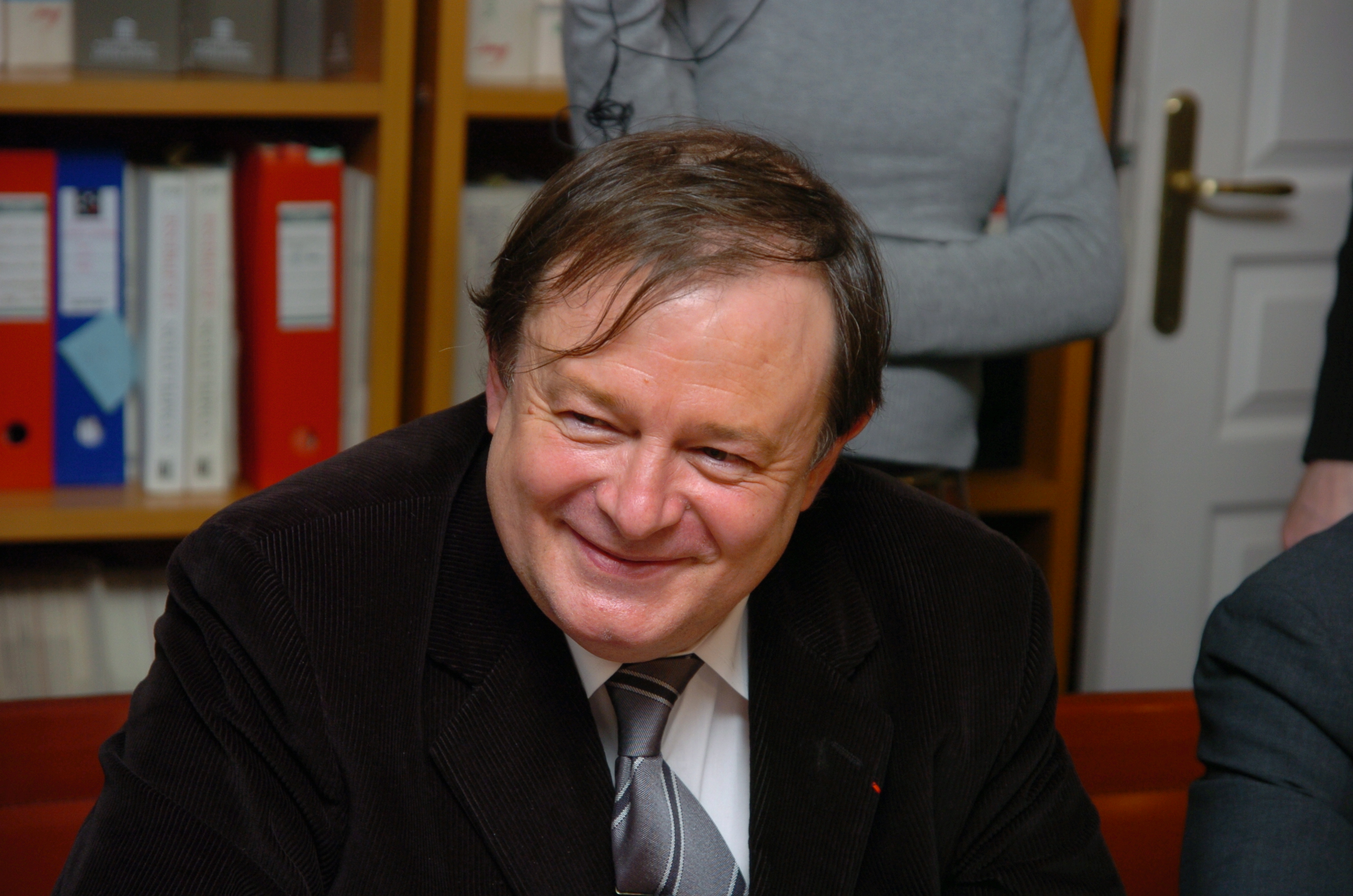
- Mignard in 2007
- Born: 22 March 1951 (age 75); Saint-Cloud, France
- Education: Master of Laws; Master of Advanced Studies in Criminal Justice; PhD in Comparative Criminal Law
- Alma mater: Paris 2 Panthéon-Assas University; Paris 1 Panthéon-Sorbonne University
- Occupation: Lawyer
- Political party: French Socialist Party (1970s-2016); En Marche! (since 2016)

Jean-Pierre Mignard (born 22 March 1951) is a prominent French lawyer, lecturer, political advisor and author born in Saint-Cloud (Hauts-de-Seine) in 1951. He is most noted for his work as a lawyer and for his political involvement in France. Mignard is a longtime friend and informal advisor to former French President François Hollande and the godfather of two of his children. As chairman of the Haute Autorité pour les Primaires, he oversaw the organization of the French Socialist Party presidential primary of 2011, which was the first-ever major party open presidential primary to be held in the country. In 2016, just one day after François Hollande ruled out a second presidential run, Mignard was among the first prominent personalities of the left to endorse Emmanuel Macron for President and subsequently became one of the Macron campaign's media surrogates.

== Early life and education ==
Born in Saint-Cloud in 1951, he received his initial Master of Laws from Panthéon-Assas University in 1972, as well as a degree in criminal justice from Panthéon-Sorbonne University.

Mignard completed is PhD in comparative criminal law summa cum laude with a dissertation on cybercriminality and repression in 2004, under the supervision of Mireille Delmas-Marty, a professor at the Collège de France.

Mignard is a member of the Scientific Committee of the Doctoral Program of Comparative Law at Panthéon-Sorbonne University.

He is a university lecturer in Media Law at Sciences Po in Paris, where he also teaches an Executive Master course in journalism and criminal business law.

He was a Visiting Professor in environmental criminal law at Nantes University law school in 2009-2010.

== Professional life ==
Jean-Pierre Mignard was admitted to the Paris bar in 1974. He specializes in criminal defense for both businesses and individuals. His areas of specialty also include media and communications law, intellectual and artistic property rights, environmental penal law, European law, and European human rights law.

Another of his area of expertise is international border dispute and litigation, with a focus on African affairs. Mignard has participated in territorial litigation resolution councils with several states, including Chad, Cameroon, and Benin, working under the supervision of French law scholars Alain Pellet and Jean-Pierre Cot. He was counsel to the state of Chad, in charge of drafting oil field exploitation agreements. He also took part in international arbitration cases in environmental law at The Hague and Paris, on behalf of publicly owned companies, or in defense of high-level French athletes such as Christophe Dugarry or Jeannie Longo, as well as reporters, show-business, and artistic personalities.

As an attorney, Jean-Pierre Mignard was involved in a number of high-profile cases, including:

- The Elysée presidential wiretapping scandal (pleaded on behalf of Edwy Plenel, then Editor-in-Chief of Le Monde, who was being tapped)
- UTA Flight 772
- The City of Paris crony hiring scandal
- The Eurotunnel trial
- The Erika oil spill trial (pleaded on behalf of the French authorities asking for remedy for the spill)
- The riots at Clichy-sous-Bois and Villiers-le-Bel (pleaded on behalf of the families of two underprivileged youth killed after a police chase)
- The Clearstream affair.
- The Mediapart v. Liliane Bettencourt case.
- An International Criminal Court appeal by Ivory Coast, in which Mignard acted on behalf of President Alassane Ouattara
- The Chokri Belaid assassination case

Jean-Pierre Mignard is the founding partner and majority shareholder in prominent French law firm Lysias Partners.

== Political involvement ==
In 2007, Jean-Pierre Mignard, a close friend to Socialist Party Presidential Candidate Ségolène Royal, was the candidate's legal counsel and an informal advisor during her presidential campaign. After her defeat to conservative candidate Nicolas Sarkozy, Mignard went on to become the chair of Ségolène Royal's political action committee, Désirs d'Avenir, a position from which he resigned in September 2011.

Mignard is known for his proximity to the former President of France, François Hollande. Hollande, Mignard, and a few others including Jean-Yves Le Drian (the current French Foreign Affairs Minister), Jean-Pierre Jouyet (a top French civil servant), and Jean-Michel Gaillard (a former civil servant and TV executive who co-authored the scenario for a French historical TV movie with Nicolas Sarkozy). Mignard, Hollande, Le Drian, Jouyet, Gaillard and Jacques Delors (then President of the European Commission) co-founded the political clubs Démocratie 2000 (in 1985) and Témoins (in 1992).

In 1993, Mignard ran for to represent Nièvre's 2nd district in the lower house of the French Parliament but was defeated, nonetheless scoring 49.40% in a historically difficult year for socialist candidates around the country, as a conservative wave swept the left-wing parliamentary majority out of power. He ran again in 2012, in a heavily conservative parliamentary district in Marseille, forcing the conservative UMP candidate to a run-off in which Mignard scored 41.54% of the votes.

Mignard is currently a member of the French National Consultative Committee on Ethics, a state body in charge of drafting ethical guidelines for public policy in France. As chairman of the Haute Autorité pour les Primaires, a position from which he resigned in 2016, he oversaw the first major-party open presidential primary to ever be organized in France. In December 2016, he was among the first prominent Socialist personalities to publicly endorse Emmanuel Macron for President, and subsequently served as one of his campaign surrogates.
