= Muhammad Sa'id al-Ashmawi =

Egyptian Supreme Court justice (1932–2013)

Muhammad Sa'id al-'Ashmawi (Arabic: محمد سعيد العشماوى, IPA: [mæˈħæmmæd sæˈʕiːd el.ʕæʃˈmæːwi]; 1932 – 7 November 2013) was an Egyptian Supreme Court justice and former head of the Court of State Security. He was a specialist in comparative and Islamic law at Cairo University, described as "one of the most influential liberal Islamic thinkers today."

== Biography ==
Muhammand Sa'id al-'Ashmawi was born in 1932. He graduated from Cairo University's law school in 1954 and became assistant district attorney and then district attorney in Alexandria. He was appointed a judge in 1961 and rose to become chief justice of the High Court, the High Criminal Court and the High Court for State Security. He was trained in usul al-din, sharia and comparative law and did formal legal study at Harvard Law School and elsewhere in the United States in 1978. He retired from the bench in July 1993.

Due to his views, Ashmawi relied on round-the-clock police protection due to death threats from Egyptian militants.

Ashmawi believed that Islamism or political Islam is at odds with true Islam or "enlightened Islam", that application of the sharia (tatbiq al-sharia or taqnin al-sharia) are in empty slogans, extremely vague in substance, that present Egyptian law is consistent with Sharia, and that civil or madani government is the proper kind of government in Islam, while religious government in Islam has been a disaster in the past. He was said to be involved in the debate over to what degree Islam can really be "a complete way of life" and "the degree and manner in which foreign moral and ideological ideas can be adopted."

One difference Ashmawi had with Islamists like Ayatollah Ruhollah Khomeini and Sayyid Qutb was whether the word Sharia as used in the Quran refers to one uniform "path" or "way" for everyone to obey. Ashmawi argued that the idea that Sharia is the core of Muslim jurisprudence and that its various commentaries and interpretations only came later in Islamic history. This jurisprudence is "entirely man-made, written by Muslim scholars according to their various schools, based on their best understanding of how the Qur'an should be translated into codes of law." Ashmawi believed that instead of referring to legal rules, the term Sharia as used in the Qur'an, refers to "the path of Islam" which consists "of three streams:

1. worship,
2. ethical code,
3. social intercourse."

Fiqh is thus not fixed and "must be reinterpreted anew" by scholars in every age in accordance with their understanding.

== See also ==
- Islamism
- Liberal movements within Islam
- Criticism of Islamism
- Rifa'a el-Tahtawi
- Jamal-al-Din Afghani
- Muhammad Abduh
- Qasim Amin
- Gamal al-Banna
- Farag Foda
- Ahmed Subhy Mansour
