= Jean Pierre Soulier =

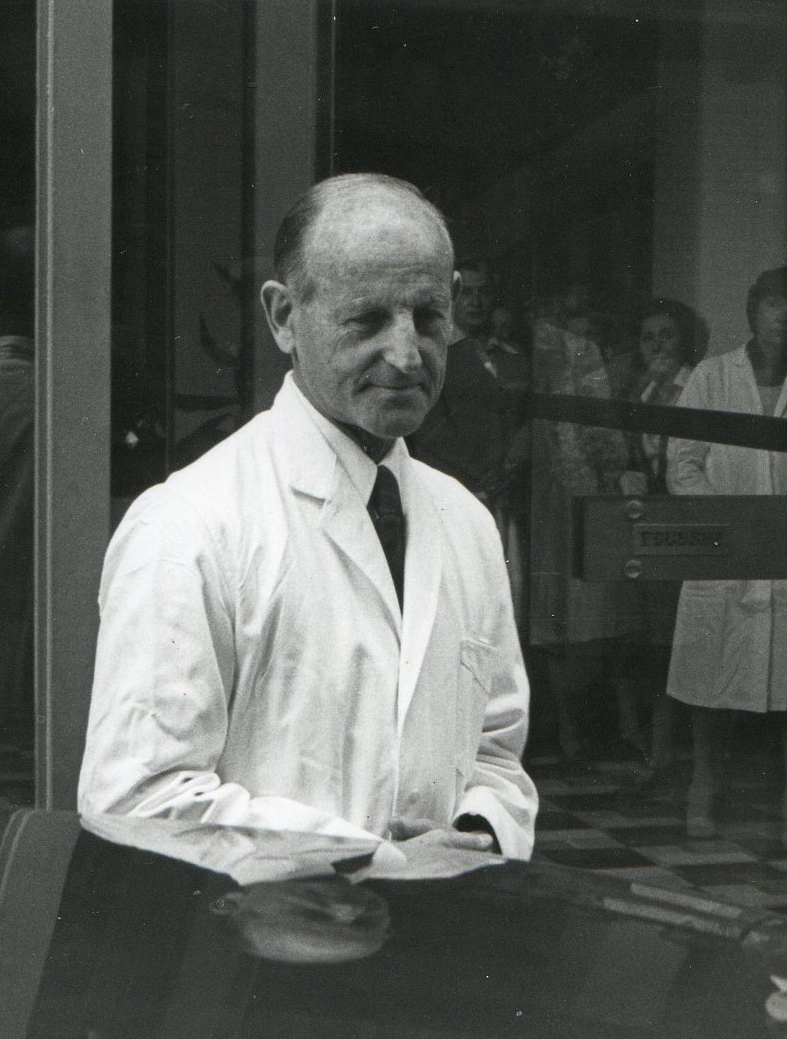
Jean-Pierre Soulier

Jean Pierre Soulier (14 September 1915 – 18 January 2003) was a French physician and haematologist. He was the General Director of Centre National de Transfusion Sanguine (CNTS) Paris and professor of haematology at the University of Paris, at the Necker Hospital for Sick Children. With Jean Bernard, he described the first published case of Bernard-Soulier syndrome.
