= Abdelwahab Meddeb =

French-language writer (1946–2014)

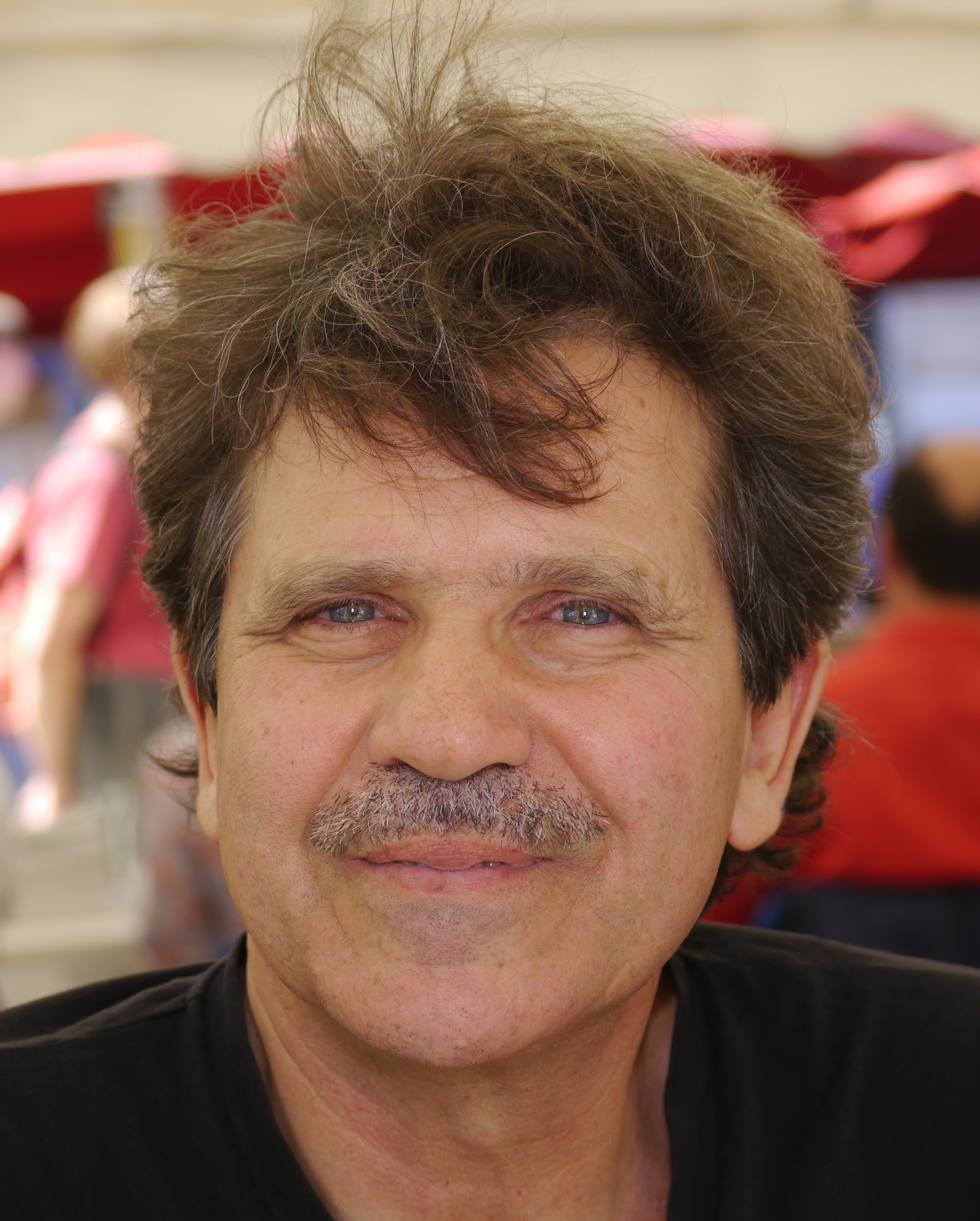
- Abdelwahab Meddeb at the 'Comédie du Livre' of Montpellier in 2011
- Born: 17 January 1946; Tunis, French Tunisia
- Died: 5 November 2014 (aged 68); Paris, France

Abdelwahab Meddeb (Tunisian Arabic: عبد الوهاب المدب; 17 January 1946 – 5 November 2014) was a French-language writer and cultural critic, and a professor of comparative literature at the University of Paris X-Nanterre.

== Early life and education ==
Abdelwahab Meddeb was born in Tunis, French Tunisia, on 17 January 1946, into a learned and patrician milieu. His family's origins stretch from Tripoli and Yemen on his mother's side, to Spain and Morocco on his father's side. Raised in a traditionally observant Maghrebi Muslim family, Meddeb began learning the Qur'an at the age of four from his father, Sheik Mustapha Meddeb, a scholar of Islamic law at the Zitouna, the great mosque and University of Tunis. At the age of six, he began his bilingual education at the Franco-Arabic school that was part of the Collège Sadiki.

In 1967, Meddeb moved to Paris to continue his university studies at the Sorbonne in art history.

== Career ==
In 1970-72, Meddeb collaborated on the dictionary Petit Robert: Des Noms Propres, working on entries concerning Islam and art history. From 1974 to 1987 he was a literary consultant at Sindbad publications, helping to introduce a French reading public to the classics of Arabic and Persian literatures as well as the great Sufi writers. A visiting professor at Yale University and the University of Geneva, Meddeb has been teaching comparative literature since 1995 at the University of Paris X-Nanterre. Between 1992 and 1994 he was co-editor of the journal Intersignes, and in 1995 he started the journal Dédale. His first novel, Talismano, was published in Paris in 1979 and quickly became a founding text of avant-garde postcolonial fiction in French. At the time, he was "considered in France as one of the best young writers from North Africa".

After 9/11, Meddeb's work, informed by his self-described "double genealogy", both Western and Islamic, French and Arabic, included an urgent political dimension. An outspoken critic of Islamic fundamentalism, he lamented the rise of Islamic fascism, which he noted was both exploitative of traditional Islamic values and given to the glorification of totalitarian dictators that sought "to colonize every last corner of private life...and that dream of exterminating whole sectors of the population" (as opposed to authoritarian dictators whose main goal is to preserve their own power.) Meddeb, then, was a staunch proponent of secularism ("la laïcité") in the French Enlightenment tradition, as the necessary guarantor of democracy that would reconcile Islam with modernity. His vigilant point of view derived from what he called the "in-between" space ("l'entre deux") that he occupied as a North African writer based in France, and from the responsibility of being a public intellectual. His erudite historical and cultural analyses of world events led to many publications, interviews and radio commentaries. His carefully researched and well-argued 2002 study, La Maladie de l’Islam (translated and published in English as The Malady of Islam) traces the historical and cultural riches of medieval Islamic civilization and its subsequent decline. The resulting posture, "inconsolable in its destitution", writes Meddeb, gave root to modern Islamic fundamentalism, a fact embodied by the modern Arab states' attachment to the archaic, Manichaean laws of "official Islam." The book also explores the tragic consequences of the West's exclusion of Islam.

From editorials in the French newspaper Le Monde on the Israeli invasion of Gaza on 13 January 2009), to Obama's "Cairo Speech" (4 June 2009), to his two weekly radio programs, "Cultures d'islam" at Radio France Culture and "Point de Vue" at Médi 1 (broadcast from Tangiers, Morocco), to his television appearances and his online interviews, Meddeb uses the media as a forum for exploration and debate. After his death, the radio programme "Cultures d'islam" is led by Abdennour Bidar. His work juxtaposes writers and scholars from East and West, engaging subjects that are historical, cultural, religious, political, and thereby challenging the stereotypes that Muslims and Europeans hold about each other. Meddeb is criticised both by militant Muslims and by some left-wing journalists, who accuse him of complacency towards the Ben Ali regime.

He translated works of Sufis such as, in particular, Suhrawardi and Abû Yazid al-Bistami.

He was also a professor of comparative literature at the University of Paris X-Nanterre.

== Death ==
Meddeb died of lung cancer in Paris on 5 November 2014.

== Literary prizes ==
- 2002 – Prix François-Mauriac de la région Aquitaine, La Maladie de l'Islam
- 2002 – Prix Max Jacob, Matière des oiseaux
- 2007 – Prix international de littérature francophone Benjamin Fondane – Contre-prêches

== Bibliography ==
=== Available in French ===
- Talismano 1979; 1987
- Phantasia 1986
- Tombeau d’Ibn 'Arabi 1987
- Les Dits de Bistami 1989
- La Gazelle et l’enfant 1992
- Récit de l’exil occidental par Sohrawardi 1993
- Les 99 Stations de Yale 1995
- Ré Soupault. La Tunisie 1936-1940. 1996
- Blanches traverses du passé 1997
- En Tunisie avec Jellal Gasteli et Albert Memmi 1998
- Aya dans les villes 1999
- Matière des oiseaux 2002
- La Maladie de l’Islam 2002
- Face à l’Islam entretiens avec Philippe Petit 2003
- Saigyô. Vers le vide avec Hiromi Tsukui 2004
- L’Exil occidental 2005
- Tchétchénie surexposée avec Maryvonne Arnaud 2005
- Contre-prêches. Chroniques 2006
- La Conférence de Ratisbonne, enjeux et controverse avec Jean Bollack et Christian Jambet 2007
- Sortir de la malédiction. L’Islam entre civilisation et barbarie 2008
- Pari de civilisation 2009
- Printemps de Tunis 2011
- Histoire des Relations entre Juifs et Musulmans des Origines à nos Jours, co-dirigé avec Benjamin Stora 2013
- Portrait du poète en soufi 2014
- Vers l'Orient. Carnets de voyages de Tanger à Kyoto 2025

=== Books in English translation ===
- The Malady of Islam. New York: Basic Books, 2003. Trans. Pierre Joris and Ann Reid ISBN 0-465-04435-2
- Islam and Its Discontents. London: Heinemann, 2004.(British Edition)
- Tombeau of Ibn' Arabi and White Traverses. With an afterword by Jean-Luc Nancy. Trans. Charlotte Mandell. New York: Fordham University Press. 2009.
- Talismano. Translated and Introduction by Jane Kuntz. Dalkey Archive Press, Champaign, Ill: University of Illinois Press, 2011
- Islam and Challenge of civilisation.Translated by Jane Kuntz, New York, Fordham University Press, 2013
- A History of Jewish-Muslim Relations - From the Origins to the Present Day, co-directed with Benjamin Stora, New Jersey, Princeton University Press, 2013

=== Poems and interviews ===
In periodicals, online, and in collections:

- Abdelwahab Meddeb. "Islam and its Discontents: An Interview with Frank Berberich ,” in October 99, Winter 2002, pp. 3–20, Cambridge: MIT, trans. Pierre Joris.

All translations below by Charlotte Mandell:

- Abdelwahab Meddeb, "The Stranger Across", in Cerise Press, Summer 2009, online:
- Abdelwahab Meddeb, "At the Tomb of Hafiz," in The Modern Review, Winter 2006, Vol. II, Issue 2, pp. 15–16.
- Maram al-Massri, "Every night the birds sleep in their solitude" and Abdelwahab Meddeb, "Wandering" in The Cúirt Annual 2006, published by the Cúirt International Festival of Literature, Galway, April 2006, pp. 78–80.
- Abdelwahab Meddeb, "California apple with no apple taste" (poem), in Two Lines: A Journal of Translation, XIII, published by Center for the Art of Translation, 2006, pp. 188–191.73-80.
- Abdelwahab Meddeb, selections from "Tomb of Ibn Arabi," in The Yale Anthology of Twentieth-Century Poetry, ed. Mary Ann Caws, New Haven & London: Yale University Press, 2004, pp. 418–419.

=== Translation ===
- In 1983, Meddeb translated into French the novel Season of Migration to the North by Tayeb Salih

== Filmography ==
- Miroirs de Tunis, Raul Ruiz, dir. 1993.

== See also ==
- Islamic Modernism
