= Desires for the Future =

Association in the French Socialist Party

Desires for the Future (French: Désirs d'avenir) is an association in the French Socialist Party which supports Ségolène Royal, the party's 2007 presidential candidate. Royal narrowly lost the Reims Congress vote on First Secretary to Martine Aubry.

Désirs d'avenir is the name of Royal's book, published at Flammarion editions.
