= Abdennour Bidar =

French writer and philosopher

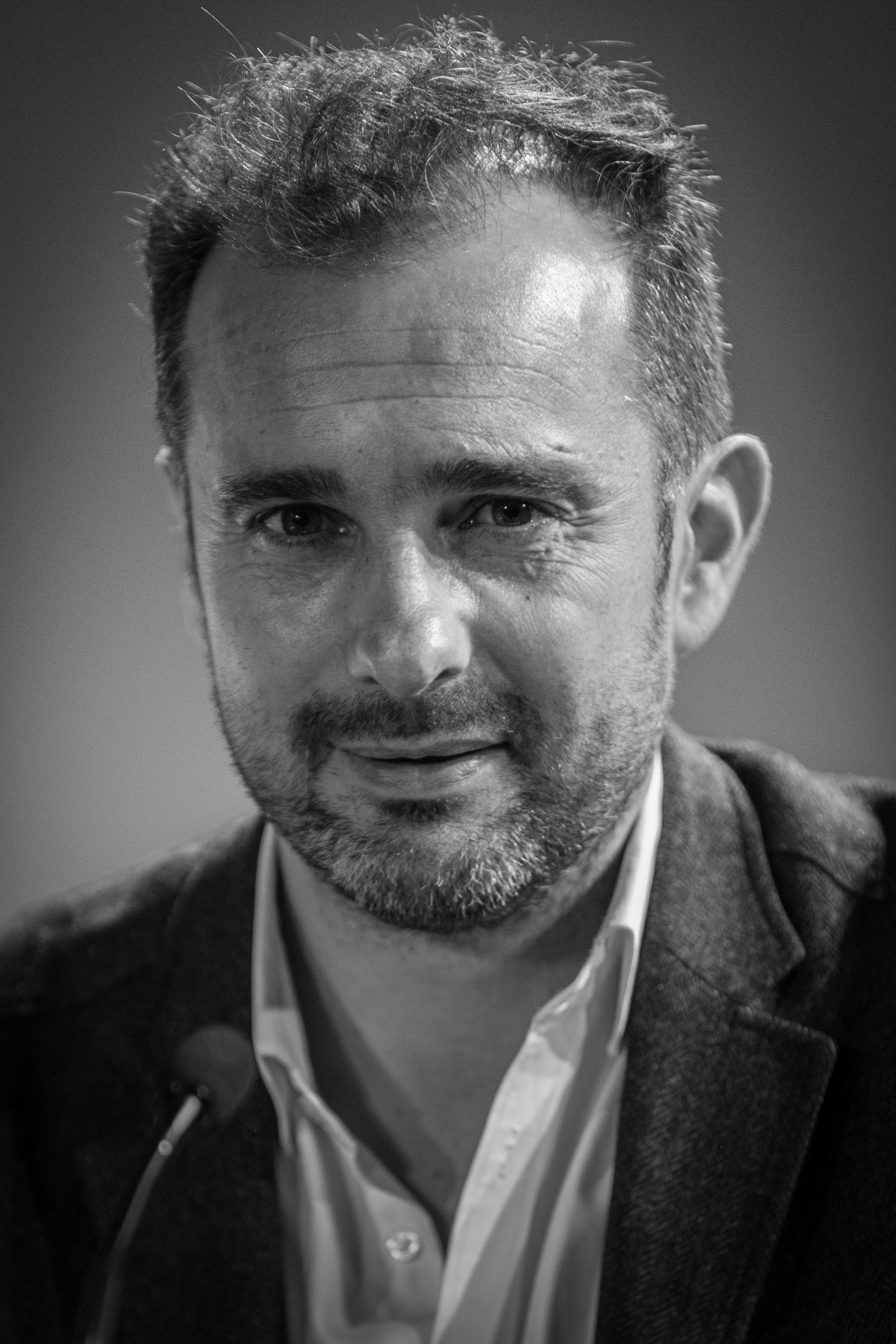
- Abdennour Bidar in 2014
- Born: 13 January 1971 (age 55); Clermont-Ferrand, France
- Education: École normale supérieure de Fontenay-Saint-Cloud
- Occupations: Philosopher; Writer

Abdennour Bidar (born 13 January 1971) is a French writer and philosopher of Islamic culture.

Author of several books and many articles, he came to public attention in the aftermath of the Charlie Hebdo shooting, when he wrote an "Open Letter to the Muslim World".

He works for the French Ministry of National Education. In 2015, due to the death of Abdelwahab Meddeb, he is named responsible of the programme "Cultures d'islam" (English: "Cultures of Islam") on the public radio France Culture.

== Bibliography ==
- Mohammed Hashas, "Reading Abdennour Bidar: New Pathways for European Islamic Thought," Journal of Muslims in Europe, Volume 2, Issue 1, 2013, pages 45 – 76, at: books and Journal Brill online
- Mohammed Hashas, "Abdennour Bidar: self Islam, Islamic existentialism, and overcoming religion," in The Idea of European Islam: Religion, Ethics, Politics and Perpetual Modernity at Routlegde.com (London and New York: Routledge, 2019)Chapter four, pp. 140-162. ISBN 9781138093843
- Kiwan, Nadia (May 2020). Abdennour Bidar: existentialist Islam as intercultural translation, in - Secularism, Islam and Public Intellectuals in Contemporary France. Manchester Scholarship Online. ISBN 9781784994129.

== See also ==
- Islamic Modernism
