= Christian Bréchot =

French physician

- Born: 23 July 1952 (age 73)
- Known for: Research on hepatitis
- Spouse: Patrizia Paterlini-Bréchot
- Scientific career
- Fields: Hepatology, immunology, molecular biology
- Institutions: Inserm; Necker-Enfants Malades Hospital; Institut Pasteur

Christian Bréchot (born 23 July 1952) is a French physician and scientist who has been serving as president of the Global Virus Network (GVN) since 2017. He previously served as president of the Institut Pasteur from 2013 until 2017 and as chief executive officer of the French National Institute for Health and Medical Research (INSERM) from 2001 to 2007.

== Professional career ==
Bréchot is specialized in hepatitis B and C and the mechanisms behind liver cancer. He was appointed director of the Liver Cancer and Molecular Virology Inserm unit (U370) in 1993 and Head of the French National Reference Center for Viral Hepatitis in 1998. In 1997, he became Head of the Hepatology Department at Necker-Enfants Malades Hospital, a position he has held until 2001. He has also been in charge of the Cell Biology Department at the Necker Faculty of Medicine until 2001.

On February 14, 2001, Bréchot became CEO of Inserm, taking over from Claude Griscelli. From 2008 to 2013, Christian Bréchot served as Vice President of Medical and Scientific Affairs at the Institut Mérieux, an umbrella organization consisting of four companies specializing in the fields of in vitro diagnostics, immunotherapy and food safety/nutrition/health, based in Boston, Lyon and Shanghai. He set up a training and research program for physicians and scientists – the Mérieux Research Grants network –, which offers large-scale, flexible funding for innovative research projects. This led him to develop an international network of prestigious researchers and scientists, especially in Asia and South America. He was also involved in training and education activities in developing and emerging countries. He developed several training programs in the fields of medicine and pure science (as part of the "École de l'Inserm"). He set up the "Inserm Avenir" grant program to help young scientists develop independent research projects.

On March 8, 2013, the Institut Pasteur announced that Bréchot had been appointed as president for a four-year term beginning on October 1, 2013, replacing Alice Dautry. The Institut Pasteur board announced on 24 January 2017 that Christian Bréchot will step down after his 4-year stint ends on 30 September 2017.

Since his arrival, Bréchot's goal has been to preserve the excellence of the institute, and to develop its international presence: "We have to give ourselves the means to recreate a scientific and attractive environment, in order to attract exceptional researchers and to respond to the new public health challenges" (Le Monde).

== Research ==
The main focus of Bréchot's research is viral hepatitis B (HBV) and C (HCV), in particular their link with liver cancer (hepatocellular carcinoma, HCC), as well as the molecular mechanisms underpinning liver regeneration and cancer (especially the deregulation of the cell cycle). His work combines academic and clinical approaches in molecular virology and cell biology.

Bréchot's research has focused on the impact of HBV DNA integration and the interactions between HCV proteins and the main cell signaling pathways, such as the interferon and TGF-beta pathways, contributing to improve the understanding of the mechanisms behind liver cancer in patients with chronic HBV or HCV infection. Christian Bréchot's team of researchers has also shed light on several aspects related to cell cycle regulation, in particular through the identification of human cyclin A at the genomic insertion site of HBV in an HCC.

Bréchot directed several projects that led to the development of an innovative diagnostic test for the detection and quantification of HBV DNA in serum. His team also used laser microdissection on liver sections to detect HCV RNA, analyze HCV quasispecies and carry out liver proteomic analysis. Christian Bréchot has investigated the clinical impact of the genetic variability of HCV, his clinical trials demonstrated the efficacy of interferon-ribavirin combination therapy in treating HCV infections.

Bréchot set up a unit in 2005 (directed by professor Didier Samuel) at the Centre hépato-biliaire (CHB) in Villejuif in the Paris suburbs, one of the main European liver transplant centers. This group explored the potential of the HIP/PAP molecule, which has mitogenic and anti-apoptotic properties in liver cells, and demonstrated that HIP/PAP has a highly original mechanism of action: its intrinsic ROS and antioxidant pathway blocking properties are particularly directed at the extracellular matrix.

The scientists also demonstrated the potential of gene therapy based on the use of NIS dnaC to transduce liver cancer cells, and the use of iodide (131I) to treat hepatocellular carcinoma.

== Other activities ==
- Coalition for Epidemic Preparedness Innovations (CEPI), Member of the Scientific Advisory Board

== Prizes and awards ==
Bréchot is a member of several specialized French and international medical associations. He has received awards, including the Académie Nationale de Médecine prize in 1996 and the Jean-Valade award in 2000. He was also a junior member of the Institut universitaire de France in 1991 for a five-year period.

== Articles ==
1. Brechot, C., Pourcel, C., Louise, A., Rain B., and Tiollais P. Presence of integrated hepatitis B virus DNA sequences in cellular DNA of human hepatocellular carcinoma. Nature, 1980, 286, 533–535.
2. Brechot, C., Hadchouel, M., Degos, F. Lugassy, C., Thiers, V., Zafrani, S., Franco, D., Bismuth, H., Trepo, C., Benhamau, J.P., Wands, J., Isselbacher, K., Tiollais P., and Berthelot, P. Hepatitis B virus DNA in patients with chronic liver disease and negative tests for hepatitis B surface antigen. N. Engl. J. Med., 1985, 312, 270- 276.
3. Wang, J., Chenivesse, X., Heinglein, B., and Brechot, C. Hepatitis B virus integration in a cyclin A gene in hepatocellular carcinoma. Nature, 1990, 343, 557-557.
4. Murphy, M., Stinnakre, M.G., Senamaud-Beaufort, C., Sweeney, C., Kubelka, M., Carrington, M., Brechot, C., and Sobczak-Thepot, J. Delayed early embryonic lethality following disruption of the murine cyclin A2 gene. Nature Genetics. 1997, 15: 83–86.
5. Barba, G., Harper, F., Harada, T., Kohara, M., GOULINET, S., Matsuura, Y., Eder, G., Schaff, Z.S., Chapman, M.J., Miyamura, T., and Brechot, C. Hepatitis C virus core protein shows an exclusively cytoplasmic localization and associates to cellular lipid storage droplets. The Proceeding National Academy of Sciences USA. 1997, 94: 1200–1205.
6. Soussan, P., Garreau, F., Zylberberg, H., Ferray, C., Brechot, C., and Kremsdorf, D. In vivo expression of a new hepatitis B virus protein encoded by a spliced RNA. Journal of Clinical Investigation. 2000. 105(1): 55–60.
7. Fontaine, H., Chaix, M-L., Lagneau, J-L., Brechot, C., Pol, S and a French multicentric study group. Recovery from chronic hepatitis C in long-term responders to ribavirin plus interferon-alpha. Lancet, 2000; 356: 41.
8. Gordien, E., Rosmorduc, O., Peltekian, C., Garreau, F., Brechot, C., and Kremsdorf, D. Inhibition of hepatitis B virus replication by the interferon-inducible MxA protein. Journal of Virology, 2001; 75:2684.
9. Perlemuter, G., Sabile, A., Letteron, P., Vona, G., Topilco, A., Samson-Bouma, M.E., Chretien, Y., Pessayre, D., Koike, K., Chapman, J., Barba, G., Brechot, C. Hepatitis C virus core protein inhibits microsomal triglyceride transfer protein activity and very low density lipoprotein secretion:a model of viral-related steatosis. FASEB Journal. 2002, 16:185-194.
10. Tralhao, G., Roudie, J., Morosan, S., Giannini, G., C., Tu, H., Goulenok, C., Carnot, F., Zavala, F., Joulin, V., Kremsdorf, D., Brechot, C. Paracrine in vivo inhibitory effects of hepatitis B virus X (HBx) protein on liver cell proliferation:a new mechanism of HBx-related pathogenesis. Proc. Natl. Acad Sci U S A. 2002 May 14; 99(10): 6991–6996. doi: 10.1073/pnas.092657699
11. Simon, M.-T., Pauloin, A., Normand G., Lieu H.-T., Mouly H., Pivert G., Carnot F., Trailhao J.G., Brechot C. HIP/HAP stimulates liver generation after partial hepatectomy and combines mitogenic and anti-apoptotic functions through the PKA signaling pathway. Faseb J. 2003, 17(11): 1141–50.
12. Faivre J, Clerc J, Gerolami R, Herve J, Longuet M, Liu B, Roux J, Moal F, Perricaudet M, Brechot C. Long-term radioiodine retention and regression of liver cancer after Sodium Iodide Symporter gene transfer in Wistar rats. Cancer Research. 2004. Nov 1;64 (21): 8045.51.
13. Girard S, Vossman E, Misek D E, Podevin P, Hanash S, Brechot C, Beretta L. HCV NS5A-regulated gene expression and signaling revealed by microarray and comparative promoter analyses. Hepatology. 2004. Oct; 40(3) 708–18.
14. Mancini-Bourgine M, Fontaine H, Scott-Algara D, Pol S, Brechot C, Michel ML. Induction or expansion of T-cell responses by a hepatitis B DNA vaccine administered to chronic HBV carriers. Hepatology, vol 40 (4) 874–882.
15. Andre P., Perlemuter G., Budkowska A., Brechot C., Lotteau V. Hepatitis C virus particles and lipoprotein metabolism. Semin Liver Dis. 2005, Feb 25,(1):93-104.
16. Murakami Y., Saigo K., Takashima H, Minami M., Okanoue T., Brechot C., Paterlini-Brechot P. Large scaled analysis of hepatitis B virus (HBV) DNA integration in HBV related hepatocellular carcinomas. Gut, 2005. Aug, 54(8):1162-8.
17. Pavio N, Boucreux D, Battaglia S, Arnulf B, Sobesky R, Hermine O, Brechot C. Hepatitis C virus core variants isolated from liver tumor but not from adjacent non tumor interact with Smad3 and inhibit the TGF-beta signaling. Oncogene. 2005, Sept 8;24(40):6119-32.
18. Lieu HT., Batteux F., Simon MT., Cortes A., Nicco C., Zavala F., Pauloin A., Tralhao JG., Soubrane O., Weill B., Brechot C., Christa L. HIP/PAP accelerates liver regeneration and protects against acetaminophen injury in mice. Hepatology, 2005 Sep, 42(3):618-26.
19. Haeffner-Cavaillon N., Graillot-Gak C., Brechot C. Automated grading of research performance clearly fails to measure up. Nature, 2005, Dec 1, 438(7068):559.
20. Lieu HT, Simon HT, Nguyen-Khoa T, Kebede M, Cortes A, Tebar L, Smith AJ, Bayne R, Hunt SP, Brechot C, Christa L. Reg2 inactivation increases sensitivity to Fas hepatotoxicity and delays liver regeneration post-hepatectomy in mice. Hepatology. 2006 Dec;44(6):1452-64.
21. Liu B, Herve J, Bioulac-Sage P, Valogne Y, Roux J, Yilmaz F, Boisgard R, Guettier C, Cales P, Tavitian B, Samuel D, Clerc J, Brechot C and Faivre J; Sodium iodide symporter is expressed at the preneoplastic stages of liver carcinogenesis and in human cholangiocarcinoma.. Gastroenterology. 2007 Apr;132(4):1495-503. Epub 2007 Jan 26.
22. Sobesky R, Feray C, Rimlinger F, Derian N, Dos Santos A, Roque-Afonso A-M, Samuel D, Brechot C and Thiers V. Distinct Hepatitis C Virus Core and F protein quasispecies in tumoral and nontumoral hepatocytes. Hepatology 2007 Dec;46(6):1704-12.
23. Dos Santos A, Thiers V, Sar S, Derian N, Bensalem N, Yilmaz F, Bralet MP, Ducot B, Brechot C, Demaugre F.Contribution of laser microdissection-based technology to proteomic analysis in hepatocellular carcinoma developing on cirrhosis. Proteomics Clin Appl. 2007 Jun;1(6):545-54.
24. Faria LC, Gigou M, Roque-Afonso AM, Sebagh M, Roche B, Fallot G, Ferrari TC, Guettier C, Dussaix E, Castaing D, Brechot C, Samuel D. Hepatocellular carcinoma is associated with an increased risk of hepatitis B virus recurrence after liver transplantation. Gastroenterology. 2008 Jun;134(7):1890-9; quiz 2155.
25. Herve, J., Sa Cunha, A., Liu, B., Valogne, Y., Longuet, M., Boisgard, R., Bregerie, O., Roux, J., Guettier, C., Cales, P., Tavitian, B., Samuel, D., Clerc, J., Brechot, C., Faivre, J. Internal radiotherapy of liver cancer with rat Hepatocarcinoma-Intestine-Pancreas gene as a liver tumor-specific promoter. Hum Gene Hum Gene Ther. 2008 Sep; 19(9):915-26
26. Battaglia S, Benzoubir N, Nobilet S, Charneau P, Samuel D, Zignego AL, Atfi A, Brechot C, Bourgeade MF
27. Liver cancer-derived hepatitis C virus core proteins shift TGF-Beta responses from tumor suppression to epithelial-mesenchymal transition PLoS ONE. 2009;4(2):e4355.
28. Dos Santos A, Court M, Thiers V, Sar S, Guettier C, Samuel D, Brechot C, Garin J, Demaugre F, Masselon CD. Identification of cellular targets in human intrahepatic cholangiocarcinoma using laser microdissection and accurate mass and time tag proteomics. Mol Cell Proteomics. 2010 Sep;9(9):1991-2004.
29. Moniaux, N., Song, H., Darnaud, M., Garbin, K., Gigou, M., Mitchell, C., Samuel, D., Jamot, L., Amouyal, P., Amouyal, G., Brechot, C., Faivre, J. Human hepatocarcinoma-intestine-pancreas/pancreatitis-associated protein cures fas-induced acute liver failure in mice by attenuating free-radical damage in injured livers. Hepatology. 2011 Feb;53(2):618-27. doi: 10.1002/hep.24087
30. Arumugam M, Raes J, Brechot C, Merieux A, Weissenbach J, Ehrlich SD, Bork P. Enterotypes of the human gut microbiome. Nature. 2011 May 12;473(7346):174-80.
31. Claire Lacoste, Julie Hervé, Myriam Bou Nader, Alexandre Dos Santos, Nicolas Moniaux, Yannick Valogne, Rodrick Montjean, Olivier Dorseuil, Didier Samuel, Doris Cassio, Carla Portulano, Nancy Carrasco, Christian Bréchot, and Jamila Faivre. The iodide transporter NIS regulates cancer cell motility and invasiveness by interacting with the RhoGEF LARG. Cancer Research. 2012 Nov 1;72(21):5505-15
32. N. Benzoubir, C. Lejamtel, B. Testoni, S. Battaglia, B. Benassi, C. Desterke, D. Samuel, M. Levrero4, C. Bréchot and MF Bourgeade. HCV core-mediated activation of latent TGF-β via thrombospondin drives the cross-talk between hepatocytes and stromal environment. J Hepatol. 2013 Dec;59(6):1160-8.
