= Muhammad Abduh =

Egyptian jurist and theologian (1849–1905)

- محمد عبده
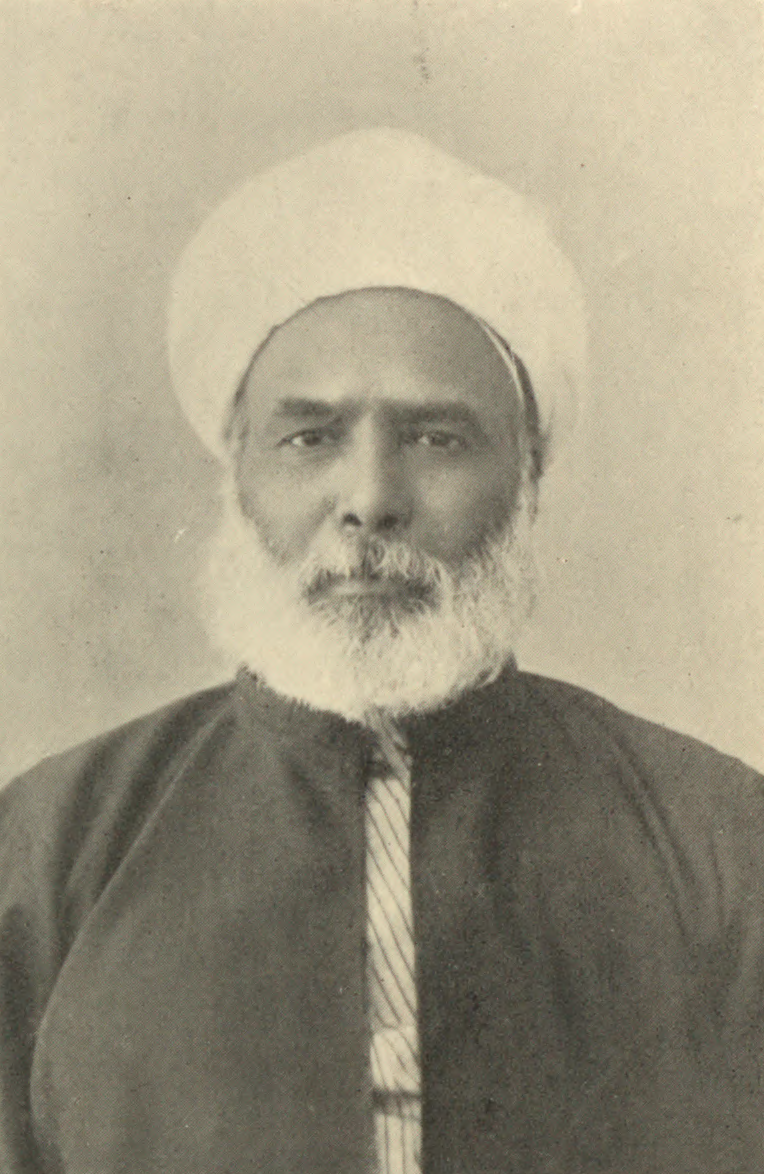

Grand Mufti of Egypt
- In office 1899 – 1905

Personal life
- Born: 1849 Shubra Khit, Egypt Eyalet, Ottoman Empire
- Died: 11 July 1905 (aged 56) Alexandria, Khedivate of Egypt
- Cause of death: Renal cell carcinoma
- Region: North Africa
- Notable idea(s): Islamic revival Islamic Modernism pan-Islamism; Educational reforms
- Notable work(s): Risālat al-Tawḥīd (رسالة التوحيد, 'The Theology of Unity')
- Education: Al-Azhar University
- Occupation: Islamic scholar, jurist, and theologian

Religious life
- Religion: Islam
- Tariqa: Shadhiliyya
- Movement: Islamic Modernism; Pan-Islamism; Neo-Sufism; Islamism; Anti-imperialism

Muslim leader
- Influenced by: Jamal ad-Din al-Afghani, Ibn Sina, Ibn 'Arabi, Shihāb al-Din Sührawardį, Abu Hamīd al-Ghāzāli, Abu al-Mānsūr al-Matūrīdī, Hasan al-Attar, Rifa'a al-Tahtawi, Gustave Le Bon, Herbert Spencer
- Influenced: Rashid Rida, Abul Kalam Azad, Hassan al-Banna, Sayyid Qutb, Muhammad Asad, Mahmoud Taleghani, Muhammad al-Tahir ibn Ashur, Mahmud Shaltut, Mustafa al-Maraghi, Mohammed al-Ghazali, Yusuf al-Qaradawi

Muhammad Abduh (Arabic: محمد عبده, romanized: Muḥammad ʿAbduh; 1849 – 11 July 1905) was an Egyptian Islamic scholar and judge who served as Grand Mufti of Egypt. He was a central figure of the Arab Nahda movement and Islamic modernism in the late 19th and early 20th centuries.

He began teaching advanced students esoteric Islamic texts at Al-Azhar University while he was still studying there. From 1877, with the status of ʿālim, he taught logic, theology, ethics, and politics. He was also made a professor of history at Dar al-ʿUlūm the following year, and of Arabic language and literature at Madrasat al-Alsun. ʿAbduh was a champion of the press and wrote prolifically in Al-Manār and Al-Ahram. He was made editor of Al-Waqa'i' al-Misriyya in 1880. He also authored Risālat at-Tawḥīd (رسالة التوحيد, 'The Theology of Unity') and a commentary on the Quran. He briefly published the pan-Islamist anti-colonial newspaper al-ʿUrwa al-Wuthqā alongside his teacher and mentor Jamāl ad-Dīn al-Afghānī.

ʿAbduh joined Freemasonry and subscribed to various Masonic lodges alongside his mentor al-Afghānī and his other pupils, but eventually left the secret society in his later years. He was appointed as a judge in the Courts of First Instance of the Native Tribunals in 1888, a consultative member of the Court of Appeal in 1899, and he was appointed Dar al-Ifta al-Misriyyah in 1899.

== Biography ==
Muḥammad ʿAbduh was born in 1849 to a father with Turkish ancestry and an Egyptian mother in the Nile Delta. His family was part of the Ottoman Egyptian elite: his father was part of the Umad, or the local ruling elite, while his mother was part of the Ashraf. He was educated in Tanta at a private school. When he turned thirteen, he was sent to the Aḥmadī mosque, which was one of the largest educational institutions in Egypt. A while later, ʿAbduh ran away from school and got married. After a brief period following his marriage, ʿAbduh returned to his school in Tanta. During this period, ʿAbduh studied under the tutelage of his Sufi Muslim uncle Dārwīsh, who was a member of the revivalist and reformist Madaniyya Tarîqâh, a popular branch of the Shadhiliyya order, spread across Egypt, Libya, Algeria, and Tunisia. Apart from spiritual exercises, the order also emphasised proper practice of Islam, shunning taqlid and stressing adherence to foundational teachings. Under the tutelage of his uncle, ʿAbduh began to practice the litany of the Madaniyya. Like many of his fellow students in Tanta, the experience would transform ʿAbduh towards Sufi asceticism with mystical orientations. Abduh would inherit many of his subsequent public views, such as firm opposition to taqlid from his Sufi uncle.

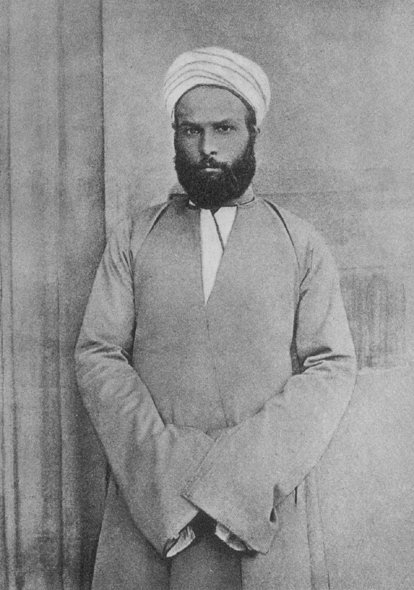
An early photo of Muḥammad ʿAbduh

ʿAbduh suffered from acute spiritual crises in his youth, similar to those experienced by the medieval Muslim scholar and Sufi mystic al-Ghazali. He was heavily dissatisfied with the traditional education and representatives of mainstream ulama of his time. Under the influence of Shaykh Dārwīsh al-Khadīr, Tasawwuf provided an alternative form of religiosity which would profoundly shape ʿAbduh's spiritual and intellectual formation. As ʿAbduh would subsequently emerge as a towering scholarly intellectual in Egypt, he concurrently assumed his role as a traditional Sufi Muslim. Tasawwuf as taught to ʿAbduh by Shaykh Dārwīsh transcended the perceived limitations and superficialities of traditional Islamic learning, and was based on an Islamic religiosity led by an intellectual, charismatic authority. For ʿAbduh, Shaykh Dārwīsh and his teachings represented orthodox Sufism, which was different from the Sufi folklore and the charlatans prevalent in rural Egypt during the early modern era. Explaining his conversion to Sufism under the training of Shaykh Dārwīsh, 'Abduh wrote:

"On the seventh day, I asked the shaykh: What is your tarîqâh? He replied: Islam is my tarıqa. I asked: But are not all these people Muslims? He said: If they were Muslims, you would not see them contending over trivial matters and would not hear them swearing by God while they are lying with or without a reason. These words were like fire which burned away all that I held dear of the baggage from the past."

In 1866, ʿAbduh enrolled at al-Azhar University in Cairo, where he studied logic, Islamic philosophy, theology, and Sufism. He was a student of Jamāl al-Dīn al-Afghānī, a Muslim philosopher and religious reformer who advocated Pan-Islamism to resist European colonialism. During his studies in al-Azhar, ʿAbduh had continued to express his critiques of the traditional curriculum and traditional modes of repetition. For him, al-Afghānī combined personal charisma with a fresh intellectual approach which the ulama of al-Azhar couldn't provide. As a young 22 year-old Sufi mystic seeking a charismatic guide and alternative modes of learning and religiosity, ʿAbduh chose al-Afghānī as his murshid. Their murid–murshid relationship would last for eight years and al-Afghānī was able to meet the expectations of his young disciple. Under al-Afghani's influence, ʿAbduh combined journalism, politics, and his own fascination with Islamic mystical spirituality. Al-Afghānī enriched ʿAbduh's mysticism with a philosophical underpinning and thereby drew him to a rationalist interpretations of Islam. Al-Afghānī's lessons merged his Sufi mysticism with the esoteric and theosophic tradition of Persian Shīʿīsm. He also taught ʿAbduh about the problems of Egypt and the Islamic world, and about the technological achievements of the Western civilization.

In 1877, ʿAbduh was granted the degree of ʿālim ("teacher") and he started to teach logic, Islamic theology, and ethics at al-Azhar University. In 1878, he was appointed professor of history at Cairo's teachers' training college Dar al-ʿUlūm, later incorporated into Cairo University. He was also appointed to teach Arabic at the Khedivial School of Languages. He is regarded as one of the key founding figures of Islamic Modernism, sometimes called "Neo-Muʿtazilism" after the homonymous medieval school of Islamic theology based on rationalism. ʿAbduh was also appointed editor-in-chief of al-Waqāʾiʿ al-Miṣriyya, the official newspaper of Egypt. He was dedicated to reforming all aspects of Egyptian society and believed that education was the best way to achieve this goal. He was in favor of a good religious education, which would strengthen a child's morals, and a scientific education, which would nurture a child's ability to reason. In his articles he criticized corruption, superstition, and the luxurious lives of the rich.

In 1879, due to his political activism, al-Afghānī was exiled and ʿAbduh was exiled to his home village. The following year he was granted control of the national gazette and used this as a means to spread his anti-colonial ideas, and the need for social and religious reforms. He was exiled from Egypt by the British forces in 1882 for six years, for supporting the Egyptian nationalist ʻUrabi revolt led by Ahmed ʻUrabi in 1879. He had stated that every society should be allowed to choose a suitable form of government based on its history and its present circumstances. ʿAbduh spent several years in Ottoman Lebanon, where he helped establish an Islamic educational system. In 1884 he moved to Paris in France, where he joined al-Afghānī in publishing al-ʿUrwa al-Wuthqā, an Islamic revolutionary journal that promoted anti-British views. ʿAbduh also visited Britain and discussed the state of Egypt and Sudan with high-ranking officials. In 1885, after brief stays in England and Tunisia, he returned to Beirut as a teacher, and was surrounded by scholars from different religious backgrounds. During his stay, he dedicated his efforts toward furthering respect and friendship between Islam, Christianity, and Judaism.

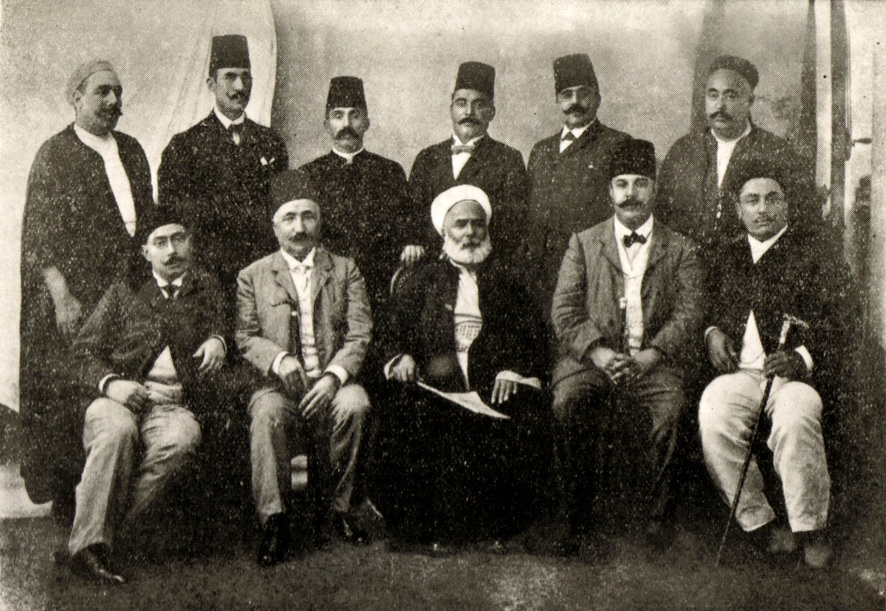
Muḥammad ʿAbduh's meeting with members of the executive committee of Tunisian educational institute Khaldounia in 1903

When he returned to Egypt in 1888, ʿAbduh began his legal career. He was appointed judge (qāḍī) in the Courts of First Instance of the Native Tribunals and in 1891, he became a consultative member of the Court of Appeal. In 1899, he was appointed Grand Mufti of Egypt, the highest Islamic title, and he held this position until he died. As a qāḍī, he was involved in many decisions, some of which were considered liberal, such as the ability to utilize meat butchered by Non-Muslims and the acceptance of loan interest. His liberal views endeared him to the British, in particular Lord Cromer; however they also caused a rift between him and the khedive Abbas Hilmi and the nationalist leader Mustafa Kamil Pasha. While he was in Egypt, ʿAbduh founded a religious society, became president of a society for the revival of Arab sciences, and worked towards reforming the educational system of al-Azhar University by putting forth proposals to improve examinations, the curriculum, and the working conditions for both professors and students. In 1900, he founded The Society for the Revival of Arabic Literature.

He travelled a great deal and met with European scholars in Cambridge and Oxford. He studied the French law and read many great European and Arabic literary works in the libraries of Vienna and Berlin. The conclusions he drew from his travels were that Muslims suffer from ignorance about their own religion and the despotism of unjust rulers. ʿAbduh died due to renal cell carcinoma in Alexandria on 11 July 1905.

== Thought ==
Work of Muḥammad ʿAbduh, translated in Old Tatar language and published in Kazan in 1911

I went to the West and saw Islam, but no Muslims; I got back to the East and saw Muslims, but not Islam.

— (Attributed to Muḥammad ʿAbduh upon his return from France

Muḥammad ʿAbduh argued that Muslims could not simply rely on the interpretations of texts provided by medieval clerics; they needed to use reason to keep up with changing times. He said that in Islam, man was not created to be led by a bridle, but that man was given intelligence so that he could be guided by knowledge. According to ʿAbduh, a teacher's role was to direct men towards study. He believed that Islam encouraged men to detach from the world of their ancestors and that Islam reproved the slavish imitation of tradition. He said that the two greatest possessions relating to religion that man was graced with were independence of will and independence of thought and opinion. It was with the help of these tools that he could attain happiness. He believed that the growth of western civilization in Europe was based on these two principles. He thought that Europeans were roused to act after a large number of them were able to exercise their choice and to seek out facts with their minds. Muhammad ‘Abduh interpreted the Muslim-Christian contacts of the crusading era as a major (or even the major) cause of the future prosperity and progress of Western Europe, pointing out the ennobling and beneficial elements of medieval Muslim civilization that the crusaders brought with them to their homeland. His Muslim opponents accused him of being an infidel (kafir), whereas his students and followers regarded him as a sage, a reviver of Islam (Mujaddid), and a reforming leader. He is conventionally graced with the honorary epithets al-Ustādh al-Imām and al-Shaykh al-Muftī. In his works, he portrays God as educating humanity from its childhood through its youth and then on to adulthood. According to him, Islam is the only religion whose dogmas can be proven by reasoning. ʿAbduh didn't advocate for returning to the early stages of Islam. He was against polygamy if it resulted in injustice between wives, and believed in a form of Islam that would liberate men from enslavement and abolish the ulama monopoly on the exegesis of the Quran and abolish racial discrimination. He described a fundamental re-interpretation of Islam as a genuine base of empowered Arab societies in the face of secular Western imperialism, and believed Islam to be the solution to political and social problems.

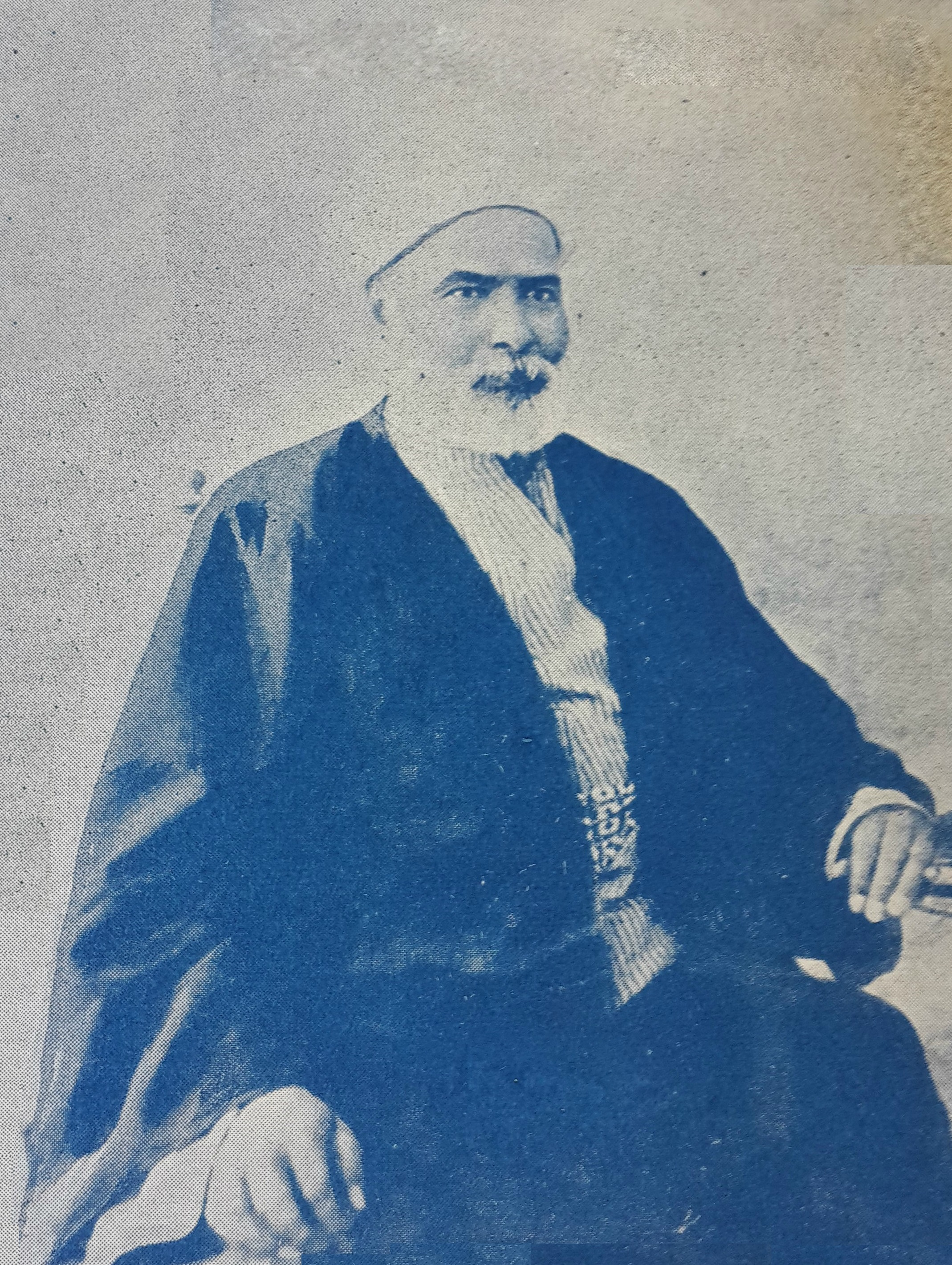
Muḥammad ʿAbduh during his last days

ʿAbduh regularly called for better friendship between religious communities. He made great efforts to preach harmony between Sunnī and Shīʿa Muslims. Broadly speaking, he preached brotherhood between all schools of thought within Islam. However, he criticized what he perceived as errors such as superstitions coming from popular Sufism. His critiques to the popular cult of Muslim saints, customs of tabarruk (seeking blessings) from relics, shrine venerations, etc. were central themes in ʿAbduh's works. He believed that practices such as supplicating and seeking intercession by placing intermediaries between God and human beings were all acts of "manifest shirk" (polytheism) and bidʻah (heretical innovations) unknown to the Salaf. According to ʿAbduh:

Shirk is of various types including that which has come to affect the Muslim masses ('āmat al-muslimīn) in their worship of other than God by way of bowing and prostration. And the greatest of these kinds of shirk is that by way of supplicating and seeking intercession (with God) by placing intermediaries between themselves and Him... And we certainly see this shirk among Muslims today. And you will not see any god added to this religion... except that (expressed by) the word "intercession" (shafā'a), which its practitioners reckon is a means of veneration the prophets and saints, but which is, in reality, a means of turning its them into idols, that disgrace the greatness of the Lord of the Worlds. The only explanation for this is in the whispers of Satan.

Despite his strong condemnation of excessive saint veneration, ʿAbduh was sympathetic to Tasawwuf and Ghazzalian cosmology. He would explain the philosophical and esoteric Sufi traditions of Islam in his treatise Risālat al-Wāridāt fī Sirr al-Tajalliyyat ("Treatise on Mystical Inspirations from the Secrets of Revelations") which articulated the philosophical and mystical teachings of his master, Jamāl al-Dīn al-Afghānī, incorporating the spiritual ideas of medieval Sufi saints and philosophers such as Ibn Arabi and Ibn Sina. The language ʿAbduh employs to describe al-Afghānī's instructions was based on a distinctly Sufi framework that symbolised Ishrāqi philosophy. The treatise dealt with substantiating the philosophical proofs of God's existence and his nature, elaborating a Sufi cosmology and developed a rationalistic understanding of prophecy. ʿAbduh adhered to the cosmological doctrine of Wahdat ul-Wujud developed by mystical Islamic philosophers, which held that God and his creation are co-existent and co-eternal. Defending the doctrine of Wahdat ul-Wujud of the Sufi philosophers and saints Ibn Arabi, Suhrawardi, etc., ʿAbduh wrote:

... we believe: there is no existence apart from His existence and no attribute (wasf) apart from His attribute. He is existent and anything else is non-existent. The first commanders of the faithful (al-umarā' al-awwalun), may God be pleased with them, Abu Bakr, Umar, Uthman and Ali said: You do not perceive anything without seeing God before it, behind it, in it or with it. ... Do not fall into the delusion that this is the belief in incarnationism (hulul). Incarnationism rather occurs between two beings when one of the two becomes the other. But we believe: there is no existence apart from His existence.

As Christianity was the second largest religion in Egypt, ʿAbduh would devote special efforts towards friendship between Muslims and Christians. He had many Christian friends and many times he stood up to defend Copts, especially during the Egyptian nationalist ʻUrabi revolt led by Ahmed ʻUrabi in 1879, when some Muslim mobs had misguidedly attacked a number of Copts resulting from their anger towards European colonialism. ʿAbduh also had meetings in Baghdad with ʻAbdu'l-Bahá, son of the founder and spiritual leader of the Baháʼí Faith, whom he had a generally positive view of—although it was asserted by his students that he was unaware of the extra-Quranic Baháʼí sacred scriptures or status of Baháʼu'lláh as a Manifestation of God in the Baháʼí Faith, and mistakenly viewed it as a reformation of Shīʿīsm. ʿAbduh's collected works have been compiled and published in five volumes by Muhammad Imarah.

== Relationship with Freemasonry ==
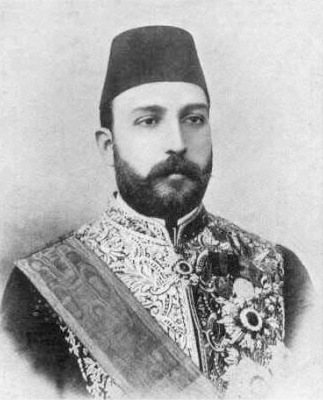
Tewfik Pasha (1852–1892), the Ottoman Khedive of Egypt and Sudan between 1879 and 1892

=== Entry into Freemasonry ===
Since the 19th century, Freemasonry and its semi-secret organizational structure provided an open forum for the discussion and exchange of ideas between Egyptians from various social-economic backgrounds in Egypt, as well as among populations of various other countries in the Muslim world, predominantly those living in the Ottoman Empire and its provinces (Lebanon, Syria, Cyprus, and Macedonia). They played an important role in early Egyptian national politics. Recognizing its potential political platform, al-Afghānī joined the Freemasons and also encouraged his disciples to join it, including ʿAbduh.

At the age of 28, ʿAbduh became a Freemason and joined a Masonic lodge, the Kawkab Al-Sharq ("Planet of the East"). Its members included Prince Tawfiq, the Khedive's son and heir, leading personalities such as Muhammad Sharif Pasha, who had been a minister, Sulayman Abaza Pasha, and Saad Zaghlul. A. M. Broadbent declared that "Sheikh Abdu was no dangerous fanatic or religious enthusiast, for he belonged to the broadest school of Moslem thought, held a political creed akin to pure republicanism, and was a zealous Master of a Masonic Lodge."

Over the years, ʿAbduh obtained membership in several other Masonic lodges based in Cairo and Beirut. In line with Masonic principles, ʿAbduh sought to encourage unity with all religious traditions. He stated:

"I hope to see the two great religions, Islam and Christianity hand-in-hand, embracing each other. Then the Torah and the Bible and the Qur'an will become books supporting one another being read everywhere, and respected by every nation.

He added that he was "looking forward to seeing Muslims read the Torah and the Bible."

=== Withdrawal from Freemasonry ===
ʿAbduh was asked by his associate Rashid Rida, a vehement anti-Mason, regarding the reason for him and his teacher Jamal al-Din al-Afghānī joining Freemasonry. He replied that they participated in the organisation to accomplish a "political and social purpose". Afghānī and his disciples, including ʿAbduh, initially viewed Masonic lodges as a vehicle for anti-colonial campaign and co-ordinate activities to depose Egyptian Khedive Ismail Pasha; enabled by the secretive nature of the lodges. But eventually, they came to the conclusion that Freemasonry itself was subordinate to European imperial powers in undermining the sovereignty of the Muslim world. Along with his mentor al-Afghānī, ʿAbduh would later withdraw from Freemasonry due to political disputes. An incident where a group of Freemasons lauded the visiting British Crown Prince sparked a serious dispute between al-Afghānī and the Freemasons; eventually causing al-Afghānī, ʿAbduh, and his disciples to quit Freemasonry. In his later years, ʿAbduh disassociated himself from Freemasonry and would deny that he ever was an active Freemason. Rashid Rida reported in the magazine al-Manār that although ʿAbduh once was a Freemason, he later "cleaned himself internally from Masonry".

In his later years, ʿAbduh additionally began promoting anti-Semitic conspiracy theories associated with Freemasonry through the early issues of Tafsir al-Manar that were co-authored with Rashid Rida. In their commentary of the Quranic verse 4:44, ʿAbduh and Rida asserted that world Jewry were enemies of the Muslim Ummah as well as Christendom. They accused a Jewish clique of conspiring alongside Freemasons to destroy the religious culture of Europe and Islamic world by fomenting secularist revolutions and inciting Christian nations against Muslims. In response to the above publication, Egyptian nationalists and Jewish Freemasons initiated a protest movement against ʿAbduh, who was the Grand Mufti at that time. They sent numerous appeals to the Egyptian Khedive Abbas Hilmi, Consul-General Lord Cromer, and Egyptian dailies to censor ʿAbduh from publishing such tracts.

In 1903, the Ottoman sultan Abdul Hamid II would restate and disseminate the anti-Semitic and anti-Masonic accusations formulated by ʿAbduh and Rida against the Jews and Freemasons as part of the Ottoman propaganda campaign against the nascent Zionist movement led by the Austro-Hungarian Jewish lawyer and journalist Theodor Herzl. In an article published in the al-Manār magazine in 1903, ʿAbduh and Rida further accused Freemasons of conspiring with the Jews and French colonialists of weakening the pan-Islamic spirit:

"There is no people in the world like the Israelites in their adherence to their sectarian affiliation and tribal fanaticism... Freemasonry is a secret political society that was formed in Europe - contrary to what they claim from their predecessors - to resist the tyranny of the heads of the world from kings, princes and heads of religion from the popes and priests who joined forces to enslave the masses and deprive them of the light of knowledge and freedom. The Jews and Christians agreed on its composition. Therefore, they made its symbols and signs extracted from the common book of Bible and attributed it to the builders of the Holy Temple, the Temple of Solomon (peace be upon him), which is the Al-Aqsa Mosque... Since the organisation's founders and the leaders were non-Muslims, there were various matters in it that contradict Islam, and the one who joined it was vulnerable to violating his religion!.. When the French began occupying the East and saw the mood of Islamic sovereignty that fervently rejected participiating in their rule... They sought the assistance of Freemasons to weaken this mood... Freemasonry is one of the forms of kufr or a means to it. However, the Egyptians are quick to succumb to blind emulation; and that is why many of them joined this organisation."

— Muhammad ʿAbduh and Rashid Rida in al-Manār, June 1903, vol. 6/5, pages 196–200.

== ʿAbduh and the Baháʼí Faith ==
Like his teacher, ʿAbduh was associated with the Baháʼí Faith, which had made deliberate efforts to spread the faith to Egypt, establishing themselves in Alexandria and Cairo beginning in the late 1860s. In particular, he was in close contact with ʻAbdu'l-Bahá, the eldest son of Baháʼu'lláh and spiritual leader of the Baháʼí Faith from 1892 until 1921. Rashid Rida asserts that during his visits to Beirut, ʻAbdu'l-Bahá would attend ʿAbduh's study sessions. The two men met at a time when they had similar goals of religious reform and were in opposition to the Ottoman ulama. Regarding the meetings of `Abdu'l-Bahá and Muhammad ʿAbduh, Shoghi Effendi asserts that "His several interviews with the well-known Shaykh Muhammad 'Abdu served to enhance immensely the growing prestige of the community and spread abroad the fame of its most distinguished member." Remarking on `Abdu'l-Bahá's excellence in religious science and diplomacy, ʿAbduh said of him that "[he] is more than that. Indeed, he is a great man; he is the man who deserves to have the epithet applied to him."

== Works ==
- Comments on Peak of Eloquence
- Al-Urwah al-Wuthqa

Other works by Muhammad `Abduh

- (1897) Risālat al-tawḥīd ("Treatise on the oneness of God;" first edition)
- (1903) Tafsir Surat al-`Asr, Cairo.
- (1904) Tafsir juz' `Amma, al-Matb. al-Amiriyya, Cairo.
- (1927) Tafsir Manar, 12 volumes
- (1944) Muhammad Abduh. "Essai sur ses idées philosophiques et religieuses", Cairo
- (1954–1961), Tafsir al-Qur'an al-Hakim al-Mustahir bi Tafsir al-Manar, 12 vols. with indices, Cairo.
- (1962 or 1963) (Islamic year 1382), Fatihat al-Kitab, Tafsir al-Ustadh al-Imam..., Kitab al-Tahrir, Cairo.
- (no date), Durus min al-Qur'an al-Karim, ed. by Tahir al-Tanakhi, Dar al-Hilal, Cairo.
- (1966) The Theology of Unity, trans. by Ishaq Musa'ad and Kenneth Cragg. London.

== See also ==
- List of Islamic scholars
- Muhammad Asad
- Rashid Rida
- Muhammad Bakhit al-Muti'i
- Mustafa Sabri
- Translation: Islamic world
- Al-Sayyid Shaykh bin Ahmad al-Hadi

== Sources ==
- Benzine, Rachid (2008). Les nouveaux penseurs de l'Islam. Paris: Éditions Albin Michel. ISBN 978-2-226-17858-9.
- Black, Antony (2001). The History of Islamic Political Thought. New York: Routledge. ISBN 0-415-93243-2.
- Sedgwick, Mark (2009). Muhammad Abduh. Oxford: Oneworld Publications. ISBN 978-1-85168-432-8.
- Watt, W. Montgomery (1985). Islamic Philosophy and Theology. Edinburgh: Edinburgh University Press. ISBN 0-7486-0749-8.

Sunni Islam titles
Preceded by Hassunah al-Nawawi	Grand Mufti of Egypt; 1899 - 1905	Succeeded by Bakri al-Sadafi
