= Syed Sheikh al-Hadi =

Malay-Arab Arab entrepreneur, publicist and writer in British Malaya

Sayyid Shaykh bin Ahmad al-Hadi (November 22, 1867 – February 20 1934; also spelled Syed Sheikh al-Hady) was a Malay-Arab entrepreneur, publicist and writer in British Malaya, who was one of the pioneers of the Malay educational and nationalist movement and advocated a rationalist-oriented reform of Islam in the Malay Archipelago.

Born in Kampung Hulu, Malacca he was strongly influenced by the Egyptian modernists Muhammad ʿAbduh (1849–1905) and Qāsim Amīn (1863–1908) and promoted their ideas among the Malay Muslims, especially for a modern image of women. He founded several journals and schools and wrote a large number of articles and books. One feature that sets al-Hadi apart from other contemporary Islamic reform scholars is his use of novels as a means of propagating Islamic ideals. His romance novel Faridah Hanom is considered the first Malay novel, he is also called the "father of the Malay novel". As a modernist and progressivist, Sayyid Shaykh also advocated British colonial rule over Malaya and called for the establishment of Anglo-Malay schools. He died in Jelutong, Penang.

== Biography ==
Sayyid Syeikh's early years are not well documented, as he did not write an autobiography and no contemporary has compiled information about them. Most of the information on this period comes from two biographical sections by his son Sayyid Alwi. According to this, Sayyid Shaykh was born on 25 Rajab 1284 of the Hijrah (= November 22, 1867) as the fourth child of his parents in Kampung Hulu, a district of Malacca. His four siblings died in infancy.

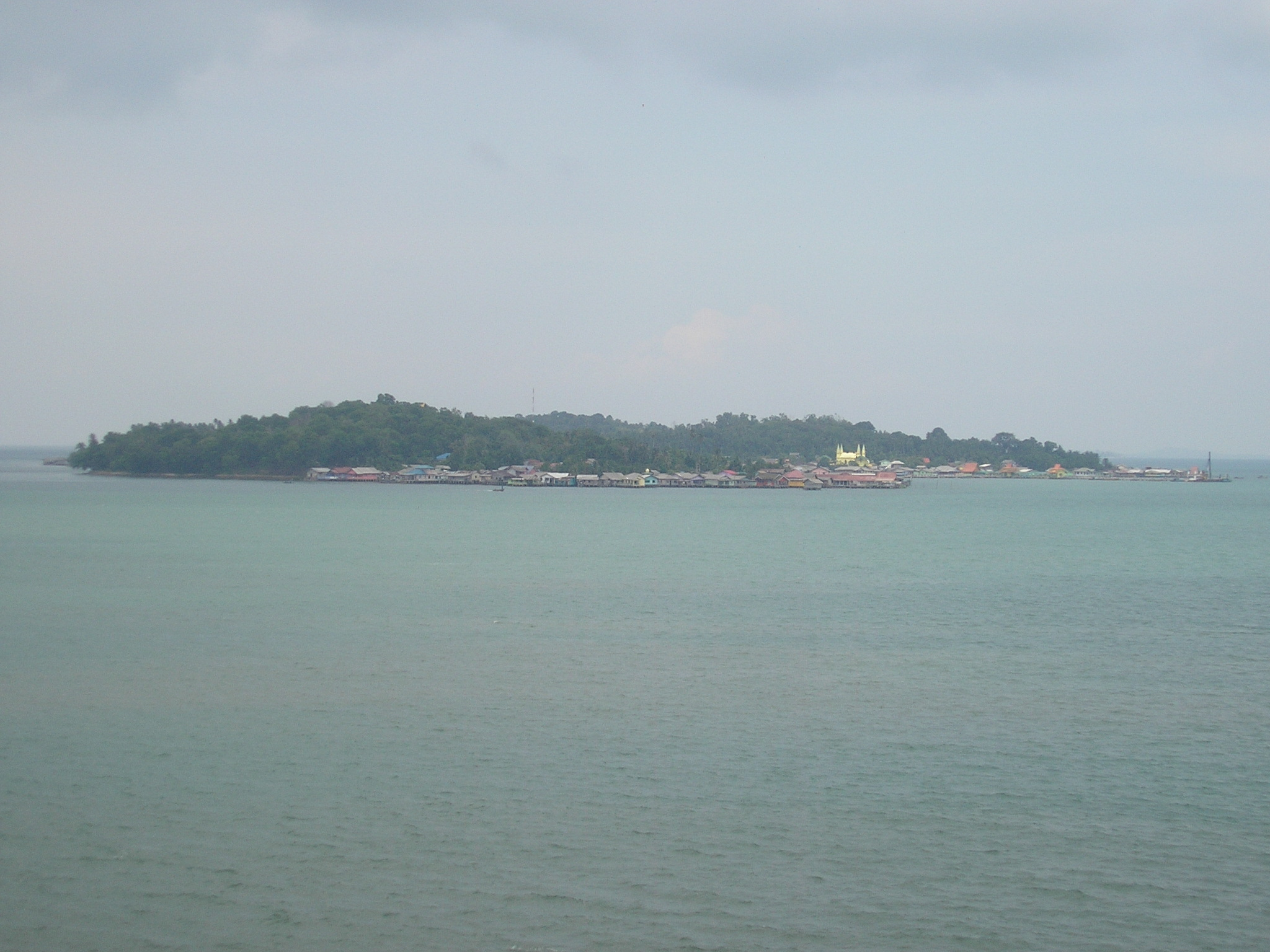
Pulau Penyengat today

=== Pulau Penyengat ===
Around the year 1874, when Sayyid Shaykh was seven years old, His father and his brother Sayyid Muhammad moved from Malacca to Penyengat Island, part of the Riau Islands, where the Buginese sub-kings (Yamtuan Muda)' of the Riau Lingga Sultanate resided. The two brothers had relations with the ruling house there, because a great-uncle of Sayyid Shaykh had married into their family. Sayyid Shaykh was adopted here by Raja Haji Ali Kelana. He was the son and designated successor (Raja Muda) of Raja Muhammad Yusuf, the then Yamtuan Muda and brother of Sultan Abdul Rahman II. Sayyid Shaykh later wrote in an article in memory of his adoptive father that he had experienced the Raja's favor since the age of 15. This indicates that the adoption by him took place at this age.

After learning the basics of the Malay language and Islamic doctrines, Sayyid Shaykh was sent to a traditional religious school in Kuala Terengganu together with his uncle Sayyid Muhammad for further studies. Here he married a girl from Terengganu and spent a lot of time with the royal family, which was possible because his uncle was a close friend of the Sultan. He took little interest in his studies, however. After a year or two, he was called back to Pulau Penyengat by his adoptive father, where he now received a full education in Malay language and culture as well as religion. Raja Ali Kelana, who had a comprehensive Islamic-religious and Malay education, partly taught him himself. Within the royal family, Sayyid Shaykh was addressed with the nickname Engku Anum ("Mr. Overripe" or "Mr. Reddish").

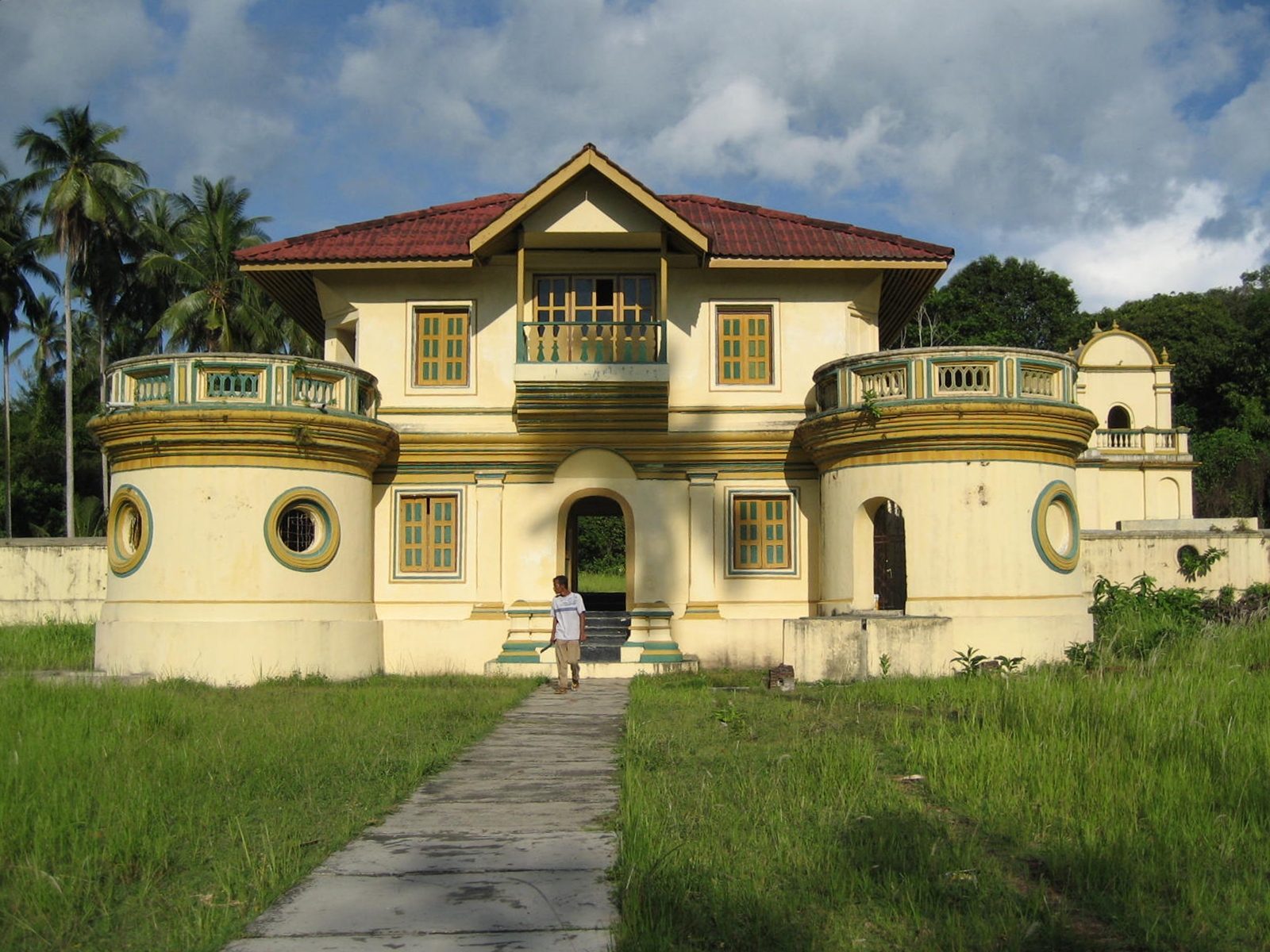
Entrance to the Sultan's Palace on Penyengat Island

Sayyid Shaykh read a lot of religious books and magazines from Egypt on Pulau Penynengat. In the early 1890s, he participated in the establishment of the Persekutuan Rushdiyyah, a study club similar to those established in Singapore at the same time, and took part in its activities. His nickname in this circle was Wan Anum. Together with the other members of the club, he is said to have discussed here late into the night about theology, the backwardness of Muslims and the possibilities of bringing Muslims in the Orient out of their state of apathy towards progress and prosperity. He was also given responsibility for the rumah waqaf, the Foundation House, where travelers were accommodated when they visited the ruler's court. There he had the opportunity to meet many well-known scholars and expand his religious knowledge through discussions. He is also said to have met Haji Husain from Palembang and Haji Salih from the Minangkabau, who later became his religious teachers.

Sayyid Shaykh's family circumstances also changed on Penyengat Island. In 1891 he married Sharifa Sheikhun, the eldest daughter of his uncle Sayyid Muhammad, who lived in the household of Raja Ali Kelana. With her he had two sons and two daughters, Sayyid Alwi (born 1892), Sayyid Ahmad (born 1896), who died as a child, as well as Aisyah (born 1897) and Umhani (born 1898). His father Sayyid Ahmad died on Pulau Penyengat on June 9, 1895.

Around the year 1894/95, al-Hadi was invited together with the Malay scholar Tahir Jalaluddin to accompany the sons of the Sultan and Raja Muda on a journey to Mecca and Cairo. In Cairo, the group attended lectures by the Islamic reformist thinker Muhammad ʿAbduh (d. 1905). In addition, there are reports that Sayyid Shaykh also met Rashīd Ridā in Cairo and the Malay scholar Abdullah bin Muhammad Saleh Zawawi in Mecca. The fact that around 1900 the Sultan of Riau-Lingga also assumed the position of Yamtuan Muda and moved his court to Pulau Penyengat, the island gained political importance. The family lived only a stone's throw away from his palace and was in close contact with his household.

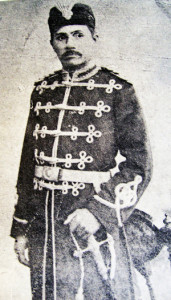
Sayyid Shaykh's adoptive father, Crown Prince Raja Ali Kelana, in 1899.

=== Singapore (1901–1911) ===
Sayyid Shaykh's adoptive father, Raja Ali Kelana, bought a brick factory on Batam Island in Dutch India in 1896, which was two hours away from Singapore. This company, named Batam Brickworks and employing 200 men, supplied bricks to the British Colonial Authorities, the Singapore Municipal Corporation, the Singapore Railway Board and the Federated Malay States. In 1901, Raja Ali Kelana appointed his adopted son Sayyid Shaykh first as agent and then as managing director of the company in Singapore. Therefore, al-Hadi moved to Singapore in the same year to Prinsep Street, where the company's representative office was located. His son Sayyid Alwi accompanied him to Singapore and attended the Kampong Glam Malay School there. Sayyid Shaykh had chosen this school for him because it qualified him for subsequent attendance at an English-language secondary school. In Singapore, al-Hadi married a second wife, this time a Malay woman. Their marriage produced their daughter Maryam in 1903.

In October 1904, Sayyid Shaykh accompanied his adoptive father on a trip to the Middle East with the aim of asking the Ottoman Caliph for support for the reinstatement of the Yamtuan Muda. However, it is not clear whether the delegation even reached the Ottoman caliph. When the delegation returned to Southeast Asia in March 1905, the Sultan of Riau-Lingga had already concluded a treaty with the Dutch, which no longer contained any reference to the office of the Yamtuan Muda and granted the Dutch Governor-General the right to name the successor to the throne of the Riau-Lingga Sultanate himself.

==== The journal al-Imām ====
During his time in Singapore, al-Hadi frequented the Arab Club and moved closer to the position of the Kaum Muda, the Malay modernists who followed the teachings of Muhammad ʿAbduh. A photograph from 1906, taken for the Malay magazine for which al-Hadi worked as an agent, shows him in Kaum Muda dress with a suit and fez.

Together with Tahir Jalaluddin and four other people, the scholar Muhammad ibn ʿAqil, the two merchants Muhammad bin Salim al-Kalali and ʿAwad bin Saidin and ʿAbbas bin Muhammad Taha, al-Hadi founded the journal al-Imām in July 1906. It was published in Jawi script and its content followed the model of Rashīd Ridā's journal al-Manār. Because of his orientation towards this journal, Sayyid Shaykh was also regarded in the Malay scholarly world as the "leader of the Manār group" (Ketua Kaum al-Manār). Al-Hadi also contributed several articles and translations from Arabic to the journal. His translations were based on articles from the Egyptian journals al-Liwā, al-ʿĀlam al-islāmī and al-Mu'aiyad.

The connection with the court of Riau and its intellectual circles contributed to the particular importance of al-Imām in the Riau region. Al-Hadi's adoptive father Raja Ali Kelana supported the journal and also contributed articles to it himself.

In March 1908, al-Hadi founded the Al-Imam Printing Company with 20,000 dollars in start-up capital together with Sayyid Mohammad bin Akil and Sayyid Hasan bin Shahah. It published a series of his articles on education in 1908, Almost at the same time, in February 1908, al-Hadi and his friends also founded the first Arabic school in Singapore, the Madrasat al-Iqbāl al-Islāmīya. It not only taught religious sciences, Arabic and Malay, but also English, arithmetic, geography, history, rhetoric and essay writing. Al-Hadi's adoptive father Raja Ali Kelana also supported the project.

However, the Sultanate of Riau-Lingga was in decline at this time. For this reason, the magazine al-Imām had to cease publication in December 1908 after 31 issues. Due to a lack of support, the school also had to close again in 1909.

=== Johor-Bahru and Malacca (1911–1916) ===
When the Dutch occupied the Riau-Lingga area in 1911, the Batam brick factory closed and Sayyid Shaykh al-Hadi moved to Johor Bahru together with his adoptive father Raja Ali Kelana, where he became a lawyer at a Sharia court. In May 1913, he traveled with Raja Ali Kelana to Terengganu to request financial support from the sultan there for a trip to Japan. During this trip, the Japanese emperor was to be asked to intervene in favor of the Sultanate of Riau-Lingga: The sultanate was to be restored and placed under Japanese suzerainty. During this time, Sayyid Shaykh also corresponded with Rashīd Ridā. When his son Sayyid Alwi left to study in Beirut with other friends in 1914, he gave him a letter of introduction for Rashīd Ridā and insisted that he should make a personal appearance before him.

In 1914, Sayyid Shaykh had a dispute with the State Mufti of Johor. The reason for this was that he himself had concluded the marriage of his daughter instead of leaving this act to an authorized Qādī. Although he was permitted to do so according to the Shafiite school of law, he had violated the official state regulation of Johor, which stipulated that marriages could only be entered into by Qādīs. The Mufti complained about this incident to the Sultan, who advised Sayyid Shaykh to apologize to the Mufti. Sayyid Shaykh refused, however, saying that he had not done anything forbidden. The confrontation with the mufti, who was the highest religious authority in Johor, worsened his social position. It also came to Sayyid Shaykh's attention that there were plans to switch to English law in the Sultanate of Johor, which had previously used an Arabic version of the Mecelle in civil law, which Sayyid Shaykh saw as a threat to his professional livelihood.

For these reasons, Sayyid Shaykh moved back to Malacca, his old home, in 1914. There he founded an Arab religious school called Madrasat al-Hādī together with Haji Abu Bakar bin Ahmad alias Haji Bacik in 1915 in Kampung Hulu, the village where he was born. However, the Malays of Malacca rejected his teachings and therefore did not send their children to his school. Therefore, al-Hadi moved on to Penang around 1916. According to some reports, he had to leave Malacca in a hurry after there had almost been physical attacks against him. The school he founded in Malacca had to close again in 1917. Overall, Sayyid Shaykh greatly reduced his educational and publishing work during his time in Johor and Malacca. This is attributed to the fact that the traditional social structures that prevailed there did not provide him with the necessary conditions for this.

=== Penang (1916–1934) ===
Why Sayyid Shaykh al-Hadi moved to Penang is not entirely clear. In 1907 he had married another woman from there, whom he subsequently visited frequently in Penang. This may have influenced his decision. However, it is generally assumed that it was the good economic infrastructure and the political system that attracted him to this island. Penang's position as one of the British Straits Settlements gave him sufficient room to implement his reform plans because, unlike the other Malay territories, neither a Malay ruler nor a state Islamic council imposed restraint on him here.

After his arrival in Penang, Sayyid Shaykh established a company in Acheen Street in George Town. He also built a bungalow for himself and his family in Jelutong, a southern suburb of George Town. He acquired the land for it from the landowner Sayyid Ahmad al-Mashhur, who was also the leader of the Muslim community in Penang at the time.

==== Madrasat al-Mashhur ====
Together with local Muslims, al-Hadi again founded a school in 1916, the Madrasa al-Mashhur al-Islamiya. It was named after Sayyid Ahmad al-Mashhur. Probably at the beginning of 1917, al-Hadi himself was appointed director of the institution. Haji Bacik supported him by making his house in Tek Soon Street available to him for the school and helping to erect another building on the site. Al-Hadi conversely ensured that Haji Bacik was accepted onto the school's board. In 1918, he also invited his former companion Tahir Jalaluddin and the Libyan Abū Jābir ʿAbdallāh al-Maghribī to become teachers at the school. His own son Sayyid Alwi took over the English lessons. The madrasa, which had about 300 students and where Arabic was the language of instruction, developed into one of the most prestigious religious schools in Malaya. Among its well-known graduates were Burhanuddin al-Helmy, until 1966 the chairman of the Pan-Malay Islamic Party, and Haji Abu Bakar Ashaari of Perlis, one of the most liberal state religious authorities in Malaysia. The school continues to exist to this day.

However, as early as 1918 or 1919 Sayyid Shaykh handed over the management of the school to ʿAbdallāh al-Maghribī. It is said to have been the institution's ongoing financial problems that prompted him to relinquish this office. Abbas Bakar Rafi' then took over this office in 1920. He was a representative of the Kaum Tua and changed the concept of the school, giving it a traditionalist orientation.

However, Sayyid Shaykh maintained his relationship with the Mashhur family. In 1921, he married his son Alwi to a woman from this family, Azizah al-Mashhur. Sayyid Shaykh took his son Mohamed Alwi, who was born in 1921, into his home and raised him as his own son.

==== Publicist activities: the al-Ikhwān magazine ====
While he was still in the service of the Madrasat al-Mashhur, Sayyid Shaykh resumed an earlier idea, namely the writing of a history of Islam in Malay. In 1922, he published the first volume of this "Islamic History" (at-Tarikh ul-islami), which was planned to consist of 15 to 20 volumes. However, seeing that the work was not selling well enough, he abandoned the project and turned to writing love stories and detective novels, which were more financially successful. Between 1925 and 1926, he published his first romance novel Hikayat Faridah Hanum with al-Aminiyya Press in Penang. The book had an overwhelming response in the Malay Peninsula at the time.

In September 1926, al-Hadi turned to journalism again after a long time and started a new monthly magazine entitled Al-Ikhwān ("The Brothers"), which was conceived as a continuation of al-Imam. The title referred to the Quranic phrase "Surely the believers are brothers" (Sura 49:10), which was also printed in calligraphic form on the cover of each issue. In the editorial of the first issue, he explained the audience he had in mind with this magazine and the purpose he was pursuing with it.

Al-Ikhwān contained articles on the need to purify Islam, the progress and reform processes in the more developed Muslim countries and the adaptability of Islam to modern living conditions, as well as sections of al-Hadi's commentary on the last suras of the Qur'an and other sections of his history of Islam as well as translations of Arabic books from Egypt. Al-Hadi also included articles on religious topics by his longtime friend Tahir Jalaluddin, by the man of letters Pandita Za'ba, the translator Muhammad Zain bin Ayub and others in the journal.

==== Jelutong Press and the newspaper Saudara ====
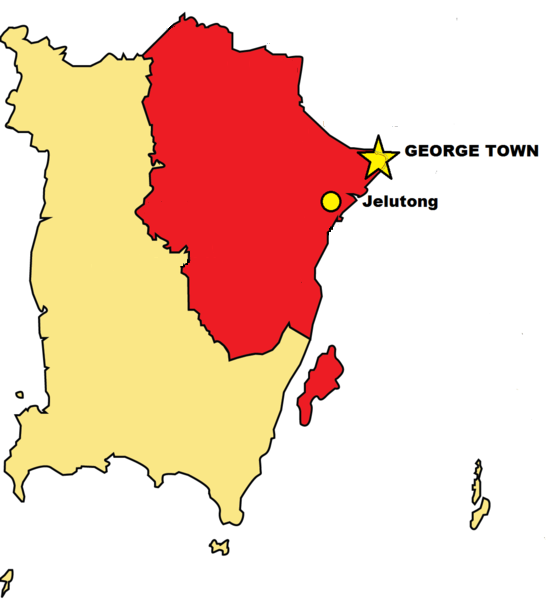
Location of Jelutong on Penang

In 1927, al-Hadi established the Jelutong Printing Press in Jelutong, the southern suburb of George Town where he already lived, which was to become the most important publisher of Islamic reformist publications in Malaya. He used the proceeds from the sale of his novel Faridah Hanum as a financial basis. The company, which was based at 555 Jelutong Road, He was also involved in the stationery trade, bookbinding and the production of stamps.

From then on, al-Hadi also distributed his journal al-Ikhwān with Jelutong Press. In addition, he published a large number of novels in the publishing house from December 1927. They appeared in a series entitled Angan-angan kehidupan ("Thoughts on Life"), which were sent to subscribers in monthly deliveries of around 100 pages. They always had a modern Islamic or Arabic background and claimed to be adaptations of modern Arabic literature. The English subtitle of the series, The Moral Trainer, made it clear what al-Hadi's intention was. In addition, al-Hadi published the Rokambul series, a number of detective stories based on Ponson's Rocambole, which he translated into Malay from an Arabic original, as well as Al-Tarikh Salasilah Negeri Kedah (1928), an official history of the Sultanate of Kedah.

In September 1928, al-Hadi founded the new weekly newspaper Saudara ("Brother, Friend, Comrade"). Although al-Hadi also criticized Malay customs and called for religious reforms, the magazine was somewhat more secular than al-Ikhwān and contained more news. Sayyid Shaykh himself explained the difference between the two organs: political discussions were to appear in Saudara, while al-Ikhwān was to remain a non-political, religious magazine. Longer articles were usually split between different issues so as not to bore the reader. Al-Hadi also printed columns and sections from his detective stories in Saudara. The newspaper had a circulation of 1000. It was later increased to 1500 to 1700 copies. The readership consisted of Malays and other Muslims in the Malay Peninsula, Sumatra, Java, Borneo, Sulawesi and Pattani, as well as Malay Muslim students in London, Cairo and Mecca. Al-Hadi initially entrusted the editorship to Muhammad Yunus bin Abdul Hamid, and from August 1930 to Abdul Rahim Kajai, who was one of the outstanding Malay journalists at the time.

Jelutong Press became the largest Malay publishing house in the following years and contributed to Penang replacing Singapore as the center of Islamic reformist thought in Malaya. In the late 1920s, Sayyid Shaykh repeatedly attacked traditional Muslim scholars in al-Ikhwān and Saudara. In response to these attacks, the ʿUlamā' of Kelantan called on their sultan to ban al-Ikhwān and Saudara. When al-Hadi heard about this, he made very disparaging remarks about this state and its scholars in an article he published in al-Ikhwān in March 1929. A July 1931 note in the journal al-Ikhwān reveals that at this time a Thai Muslim scholar took on the Malay rulers against the Kaum Muda and Sayyid Shaykh's followers, denigrating them as Communists and Wahhabis and calling for their killing. As can be seen from the accounts of his grandson Sayyid Alwi, Sayyid Shaykh himself was also repeatedly subjected to verbal attacks in his personal environment during this time, for example on the street and in public markets.

==== Financial difficulties and final years ====
When the world economic crisis broke out in 1929, Sayyid Shaykh, together with friends from Jelutong, started the "Cooperative of Poor Brothers" (Persekutuan al-Ikhwān al-Masākīn), whose statutes he drew up himself. However, due to the dishonest behavior of the other members of the society, who used the society for their own selfish purposes, his efforts in this regard failed. He finally withdrew from the society and publicly denounced it in al-Ikhwān.

Somewhat later, al-Hadi himself ran into financial difficulties. Although Jelutong Press had only three permanent employees, in order to keep the business running, he had to obtain a mortgage on his house from a Tamil merchant. Since Abdul Rahim Kajai moved to the newspaper Majlis in September 1931, Sayyid Shaykh first entrusted his son Alwi with the editorship of Saudara and then took over this task himself for a while. Due to the great financial hardship, he also had to discontinue the magazine al-Ikhwān in December 1931.

However, the newspaper Saudara remained a success. From 1932, it was published twice a week. Although al-Hadi was able to find a new editor in Abdul Wahhab bin Abdullah in 1932, he had to step in again himself in February 1933. Jelutong Press also published Sayyid Shaykh's translations of Muhammad ʿAbduh's Qur'anic exegetical works and an excerpt from Qāsim Amīn's book on the liberation of women, his own work Ugama Islam dan Akal ("The Religion of Islam and Reason") and numerous works by other modernist and reformist authors. These included, for example, the text Umbi Kemajuan ("The Root of Progress", 1932) by the Malay scholar Zainal Abidin Ahmad, better known as Pendeta Za'ba (1885–1973), as well as a translation of articles from the Islamic Review, the organ of the Woking Muslim Mission. It also included the collection of essays Hadiah Kebangsaan (National Gift, 1933), which contained al-Hadi's translations of Muhammad ʿAbduh's essays on honest praise and Sharaf, as well as two by Za'ba on poverty and the salvation of the Malays. They had all previously appeared in the journal al-Ikhwan. Finally, numerous works by Tahir Jalaluddin also appeared in the publishing house, including the text Perisai Prang Beriman tentang Madzhab Prang Kadian ("The Shield of the Believers against the doctrine of the Qadiyanis", 1930), a refutation of the teachings of the Ahmadiyya.

=== Death and descendants ===
Sayyid Shaykh died in his house in Jelutong on February 20, 1934. Although his son Alwi gave a brain disease as the cause of death, but this has been questioned by Sayyid Shaykh's grandson Mohamed Alwi, who himself witnessed his death. Mohamed Alwi reported that Sayyid Shaykh had severe pain in his neck and left arm in the days before his death, and suggested that he died of heart failure.

Sayyid Shaykh was buried at the Friday mosque cemetery in Jelutong, Penang. His funeral was very well attended. However, the funeral service and the grave were kept very simple at Sayyid Shaykh's request. His longtime friend Tahir Jalaluddin spoke a prayer, and ʿAbdallāh al-Maghribī gave a eulogy for the deceased. Pendeta Za'ba wrote an obituary that was published in Sayyid Shaykh's newspaper Saudara on February 24. In it, he wrote that Sayyid Shaykh's death would be a hard loss especially for the followers of Islāh in the Malay Peninsula.

The Tamil merchant with whom Sayyid Shaykh had taken out a mortgage had the house auctioned off after his death, so that his wife and grandson Mohamed Alwi had to move into a small mangrove house. They lived there in poor conditions. The magazine Saudara was continued after Sayyid Shaykh's death, first by Tahir Jalaluddin and then by Sayyid Shaykh's son Alwi, and lived on until 1941. Alwi became active in the Malay nationalist movement during the 1930s and was one of the founders of the UMNO party.

== Works ==
=== Works of fiction ===
==== Hikayat Faridah Hanum ====
The novel Hikayat Faridah Hanom ("The Story of Mrs. Faridah"), actually Hikayat Setia ʿAshik kepada Maʿshok-nya atau Shafik Afandi dengan Faridah Hanum ("The Story of the Lover Who Was Faithful to His Beloved or Shafik Afandi and Faridah Hanum") was published in 1925/26 in two volumes with a total of 335 pages. The book is considered the first novel of Malay literature in the true sense of the word. In style, Hikayat Faridah Hanum corresponds to the French bourgeois novels of the 19th century by Emile Zola, Anatole France and Gustave Flaubert's Madame Bovary. The novel also includes poetic passages with double verse of the traditional Gurindam type, reviving this form of Malay poetry. The Hikayat Faridah Hanum was extraordinarily successful: to date, the book has gone through six editions. While the first three editions (al-Maktaba al-Aminiyyah, Mercantile Press 1925/26, Jelutong Press 1927/28 and Qalam, Singapore 1950) were published in Jawi script, the later editions (1964, 1985 and 2017) were printed in Latin script.

Hikayat Faridah Hanum is set in Cairo in 1894, where Faridah Hanum, a very beautiful young woman, has a love affair with Shafik Efendi, a handsome young man. Both come from wealthy, aristocratic families and are well educated; unlike her lover, Faridah has not only a Western but also an Islamic education. The two are deeply in love with each other and swear eternal fidelity. At the same time, they are united by the desire to serve their homeland (watan) and nation (bangsa). However, Faridah has been promised to her cousin Badruddin by her father. The father insists that this promise of marriage be carried out, although Faridah protests against it and falls so seriously ill after the separation from Shafik Efendi that her life is threatened. After the marriage, however, she is able to achieve a dissolution of the marriage through clever tactics and then marry her lover Shafik. After her marriage to Shafik, Faridah campaigned for women's education in Egypt and founded various schools for girls, whose graduates later became internationally known as women's rights activists.

In the novel, Al-Hadi uses the characters and the setting of modern Egypt to put forward his ideas regarding the emancipation of women. He skillfully moves between fact and fiction, blending them in the composition of his narrative. In addition, the novel is about showing how Islamic values can be implemented in society. Sayyid Shaykh was a pioneer with this concept of using the novel as a form of conveying Islamic principles. The novel also contains an explicit reading recommendation: Shafik Efendi is instructed by his father that if he wants to know something about Islam, he should regularly read the journal al-Manār by Rashīd Ridā and Muhammad ʿAbduh, because it offers discussions about Islam and its compatibility with progress.

However, the novel not only deals with socio-ethical issues, but also contains many erotic passages. Thus it is recounted how the lovers meet in a house rented especially for this purpose and Shafik Efendi embraces and kisses his lover with her permission. In one scene, Faridah appears before her lover in a nude dress to put him to the test. Later, a long poem, enriched with religious symbols and metaphors, describes how Shafik Efendi deflowered his lover in the bridal chamber after the wedding. The first editions of the book were also illustrated with erotic photographic images. They showed seductive images of Faridah Hanum and of Faridah and Shafik in intimate contact. According to Christine Campbell, the erotic passages were a concession to the young male readership, whose attention Sayyid Shaykh wanted to draw to his project of Islamic reform. They were also intended to secure the income he needed to continue publishing.

==== Other romance novels ====
Sayyid Shaykh published four more romance novels in the late 1920s:

- Hikayat Taman Cinta Berahi atau Mahir Afandi dengan Iqbal Hanum ("The Story of the Garden of Enraptured Love or Mahir Afandi and Iqbal Hanum"), novel 1928, over 600 pages, love story set in modern Egypt.
- Hikayat Anak Dara Ghassan atau Hindun dengan Hammad ("The Story of the Maiden of Ghassān or Hind and Hammād"), Jelutong Press 1928–29, over 1000 pages, Novel about the love of the Christian Arab princess Hind for the Arab Muslim prince Hammād in the time of the Prophet Muhammad, modeled on the historical novel Fatāt Ghassān by Jurjī Zaidān. The book was republished in 1959.
- Hikayat Puteri Nur ul-ʿAin atau Bahaya Bercerai Talak Tiga dan Bercina Buta (The Story of Princess Nuru l'Ain or the Danger of Separation with Triple Talāq and Intermarriage; 1929) A short work of 200 pages.
- Hikayat Cermin Kehidupan ("The Story of the Mirror of Life"), 1929, 604 pages, a Turkish story emphasizing the need for chastity among the youth.

All these books were very popular, but none of them reached the popularity of his novel Faridah Hanum. The popularity of the Hanum stories can also be seen from the fact that since their publication, many Malays have chosen the name Hanum or Hanim for their female children. The intention of his romance novels was to introduce readers to the ideas of a new social order and a modern attitude towards the status of women, and to illustrate the adaptability of Islam to the changing conditions of life in the modern world.

==== Rokambul series ====
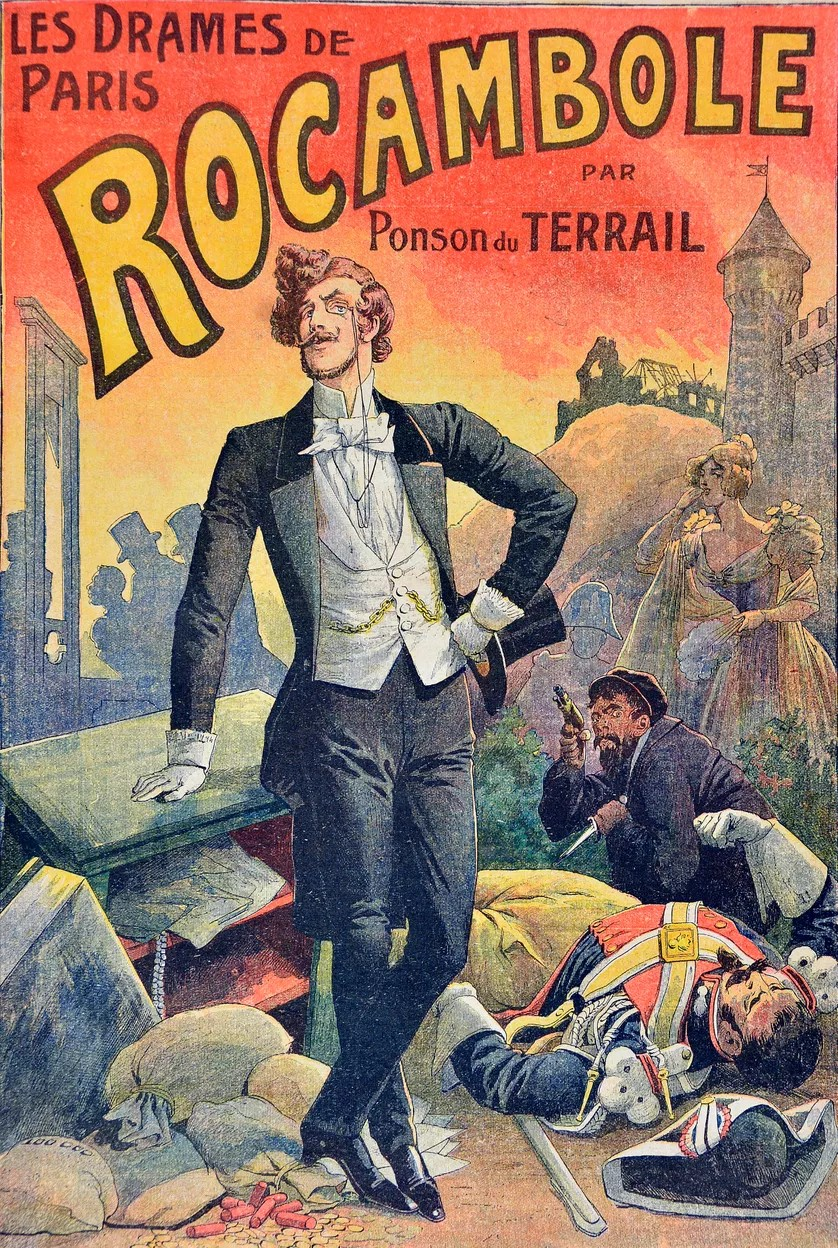
Rocambole by Louis Charles Bombled

These are seven detective stories modeled on the Rocambole stories by Pierre Alexis Ponson du Terrail (1829–1871), which al-Hadi probably translated into Malay from an Arabic original. The first Rokambul stories were published in his monthly magazine al-Ikhwān in 1928. In 1929, he published them in his weekly newspaper Saudara. Before his death, they also appeared in book form. The stories are as follows:

- Cerita Rokambul dengan Puteri Russian yang 'Ashik ("The Tale of Rocambole with the Russian Princess in Love"), 498 pages.
- Cerita Rokambul dalam Siberia ("The story of Rocambole in Siberia"), 400 pages.
- Cerita Rokambul dengan Perbendaharaan Hindi atau Peperangan di antara Kebajikan dengan Kejahatan dalam Kehidupan Manusia (The Story of Rocambole and the Indian Treasury or The Struggle between Good and Evil in the Lives of Men), 509 pages.
- Cerita Rokambul dalam Jail dan di-Paris ("The story of Rocambole in prison and in Paris"), 398 pages.
- Cerita Rokambul dengan Korban Hindi ("The story of Rocambole and the Indian victim"), 502 pages.
- Cerita Rokambul dengan Medium Kaum Nor ("The story of Rocambole and the Medium of the Light People"), 508 pages.
- Cerita Rokambul dengan Taman Penglipor Lara (The Story of Rocambole and the Storyteller's Garden), 296 pages.

With this series, Sayyid Shaykh introduced the detective story genre to Malay literature. His Rokambul stories are also the best-known detective stories in the Malay language.

=== Non-fictional works ===
- At-Tarbiya wa-t-taʿlīm. Pemeliharaan dan Pembelajaran ("Rearing and Education") 1908, 60 pages. This is a series of articles that first appeared in the journal al-Imām and emphasizes the importance of education for the development of the Muslim Ummah. The articles were based on the Arabic book at-Tahliya wa-t-tarġīb fī tarbiya wa-t-tahḏīb by Saiyid Muhammad, published in Cairo in 1903.
- At-Taʾrīkh al-islāmī ("Islamic History"), published in 1922 in Penang by Mercantile Press, 205 pages. The book, based on a series of articles Sayyid Shaykh had published in al-Imām from 1906 to 1908, deals with the early history of Muslims, in particular the emergence of Islam in pre-Islamic Arab society, its propagation in Mecca, the establishment of the Islamic community in Medina and the major battles of the Prophet Muhammad.
- Tafsir Ǧuzʾ ʿAmma yatasāʾalūn, commentary on the 30th and last part of the Qur'an, which begins with Sure 78, published in 1927 by Jelutong Press, first in the journal al-Ikhwān, then as an independent book. It is the Malay translation of a work by Muhammad ʿAbduh.
- Tafsīr al-Fātihah, annotated translation of the Fātiha, published in 1928 by Jelutong Press, based on the commentary on the Fātiha by Muhammad ʿAbduh from 1901.
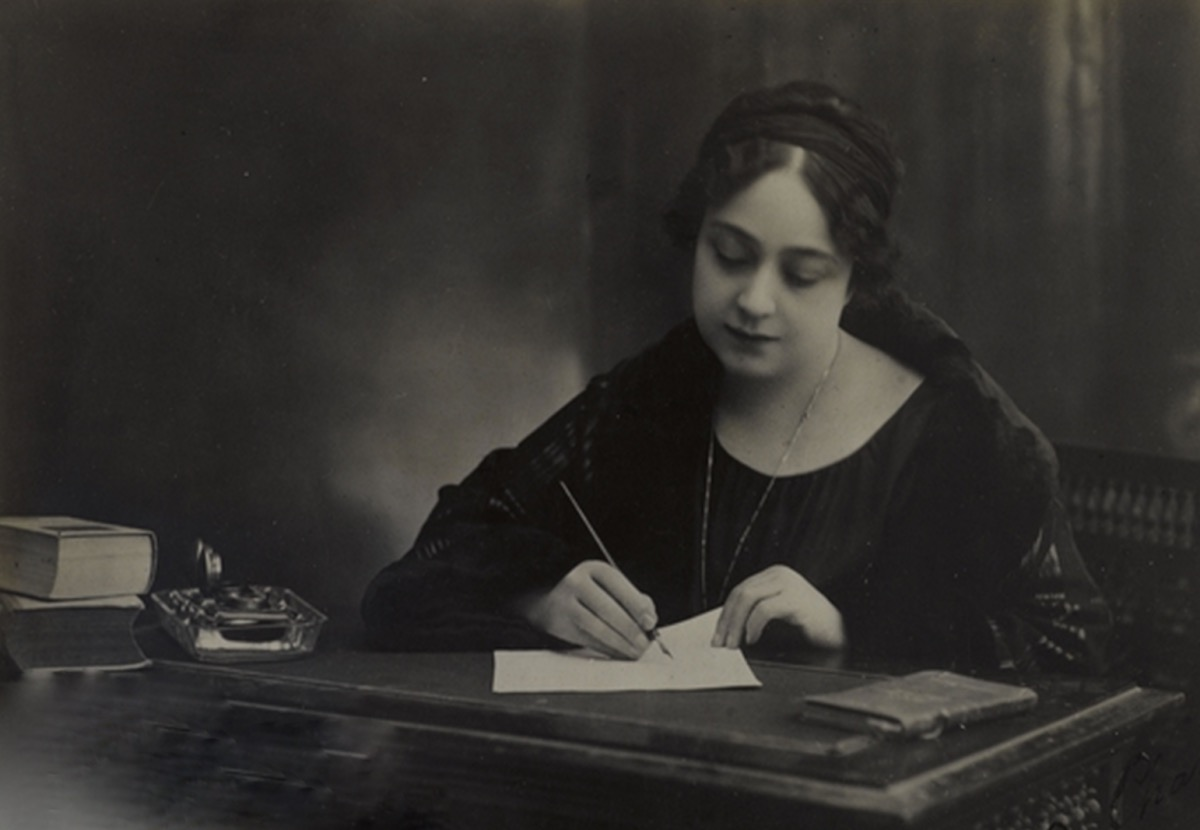
  Hudā Schaʿrāwī, for Sayyid Shaykh the ideal image of a modern Muslim woman
- Kitab 'Alam Perempuan ("The Book on the Nature of Woman") was published by Jelutong Press in 1930 and contained a series of articles that had previously appeared in al-Ikhwān The subtitle "A discussion of the benefits of women's freedom for themselves, for the society of their nation and their fatherland, with rational and scriptural evidence from the Sharia of Islam" shows what Sayyid Shaykh's intention was with the book. According to Roff, half of the book was a translation of the famous book Taḥrīr al-Marʾa ("The Liberation of Women") by Qāsim Amīn. It also contained illustrations of various Egyptian women's rights activists such as Hudā Shaʿrāwī.
- Ugama Islam dan 'Akal ("The Religion of Islam and Reason"), treatise in nine chapters, Published in 1931 by Jelutong Press. As al-Hadi explains in the preface, the book aims to enlighten Muslims that Islam is in line with reason by showing that the religious duties of Muslims provide an answer to modern needs. Chapter 1 aims to show the reader that Islam has great respect for reason, chapter 2 demonstrates that egalitarianism is the foundation of Islam, chapter 3 attempts to show that Islam promotes peace and harmony between people, chapter 4 deals with the appreciation of thrift, simplicity and hard work in Islam, chapter 5 deals with universality and chapter 6 with the practical wisdom of Islam. A second edition in Latin script was published in 1965 by his son Sayyid Alwi in Kota Bharu.
- In 1933, the British Malaya Cooperative Office published a study by al-Hadi on the question of Ribā. In it, he presented the entire spectrum of Muslim scholars on the issue and attempted to show that bank interest, shares and cooperatives are permissible according to Islamic doctrine. However, the paper has not survived.

== Positions ==
=== Religion ===
==== Rationality of Islam ====
Like Muhammad Abduh, al-Hadi addressed his writings less to convinced Muslims than to those educated Malays who doubted that Islam could still serve as a guide in modern life. He himself, on the other hand, was firmly convinced that Islamic religion and rationality were compatible. This was also the main theme of his book "Islam and Reason", published in 1930. In it, he went through the five pillars of Islam one by one and attempted to demonstrate their rationality. The purpose of the Confession of Faith, for example, was to give people a firm belief in God. This, explains al-Hadi, frees people from the fear of powers or energies beyond the causality created by God, because the believer knows that God's power transcends all other powers. He therefore no longer fears powers and energies that are attributed to wood, stones, idols, graves, spirits or demons. As Islam was still strongly mixed with animist and Hinduism elements among the Malay Muslims at the time, this statement had a strong impact. elements, this statement had a particular relevance.

In his discussion of the daily prayers, Sayyid Shaykh emphasized their social and moral benefits in the sense that if a Muslim wholeheartedly performs this duty, he will not commit any misdeeds forbidden by God. Here he referred to the Quranic word in Surah 29:45, according to which prayer forbids doing what is detestable and reprehensible. In his opinion, Muslims who performed the prayers but still transgressed God's commandments did not possess sufficient Fear of God because they did not understand the meaning and significance of what they recited in their prayers. Al-Hadi emphasized that the five daily prayers did not take up much time and did not distract Muslims from their work and efforts to achieve worldly success. Although they make an important contribution to peace, agility and enthusiasm at work and securing the necessities of life in the competitive world, the performance of these prayers takes less than two hours.

Although Al-Hadi believed that one could perform the obligatory prayers alone, he recognized that praying in a group had an additional social significance. Participation in Friday prayer was, in his view, obligatory because it established a good social relationship between Muslims and gave them a good opportunity to hear the sermons that urged them to do good and avoid bad actions. However, al-Hadi was skeptical about achieving the social goals of the sermons that were read out at the Friday service. He wrote in December 1927 that 99 percent of Muslims who attended Friday prayers in Malaya did not understand the Friday sermon because it was delivered in an incomprehensible language.

According to al-Hadi, the Zakāt also has social functions: It is a means to show love, and brotherhood, and to provide help. Al-Hadi criticized the Malay Muslims for not managing the collected zakāt properly and not giving it to the rightful recipients, and recommended that it be used for the development of socio-economic projects such as the establishment of Islamic colleges, universities and Muslim factories where unemployed Muslims could work. He interpreted this as a contemporary interpretation for the Quranic instruction in Sura 9:60 that one should use the alms in the way of God.

The Hajj was seen by al-Hadi as a ritual that served to establish social and business contacts between Muslims from all over the world. He argued that the great modern nations also had various facilities and opportunities for socializing.

==== Polemics against traditional scholarship ====
Although Sayyid Shaykh was certain that Islam was a rational religion, he believed that it had deviated from its original aims in the present. He blamed "the majority of ʿUlamā' and Fiqh students" for this. They had exploited Islam for their own purposes to such an extent that it had "become a joke". This thesis was also the subject of a separate article for al-Ikhwān in November 1930. In it, al-Hadi wrote that Islam itself was not responsible for the decline of Muslims, but the "greedy religious leaders" (angkara ketua-ketua agama). Although they were able to read Arabic books and had a command of Arabic grammar and syntax, they were as far removed from true Islam as heaven and earth. In his book "Islam and Reason", al-Hadi recommended that Malay Muslims should not give their Zakāt to these "religious men in white caps and large turbans", but only to those recipients who were entitled to it.

Sayyid Shaykh referred to those who taught what he considered to be false Islam as Kaum Tua ("traditionalists"), while he called those who advocated a modern, rationalist Islam Kaum Muda ("modernists"). In an article entitled "Trust in the Scholars" (Percayakan Ulama) in March 1929, he accused the Kaum Tua of uncritically accepting the opinions of the ʿUlamā' presented orally or in books, on the assumption that these were based on the Qur'an and hadith. The position of the Kaum Muda, on the other hand, is that no individual's opinion is infallible because only the Qur'an and hadiths are incontestable. In the case of the scholars' doctrines, Muslims always have the duty to check their truthfulness. If they agree with the teachings of the Quran and the Prophet, they should be accepted, otherwise they must be rejected. He rejected the view that one should not study the words of the Qur'an and the Prophet oneself, because this indicates that the person concerned has no faith in the ʿUlamā' and has deviated from Islam. Such claims would only be made by those ʿUlamā' who earned their living "in the name of Islam" and acted as street vendors of the religion. Islam, however, would like to keep such people as far away from itself as possible.

==== Criticism of traditional customs and Sufism ====
Just as Sayyid Shaykh repeatedly emphasized the rationality of Islam, he was conversely fiercely critical of traditional Malay practices. In 1930, he expressed his disappointment in an article about the fact that marriage, "an act that is so honorable in Islam", had become a heavy financial burden for the Malays, especially for the Walī and the bride's relatives. Sayyid Shaykh said that it was not very difficult for rich people to fulfill the requirements of this custom. The problem, in his opinion, was mainly for the middle class and the poor: In order to fulfill this custom in the same way that the nobles (datuk datuk) and the rich (orang kaya) did, some of them had to borrow money or take out a mortgage on their land. Therefore, Sayyid Shaykh urged the rich to take the first step towards change so that the poor would follow them. He also sharply criticized the many inconveniences that the bride and groom had to endure, especially the bride in preparing for the wedding. He particularly criticized the Malaccan adat, in which a particularly elaborate way of dressing up the bride was cultivated.

Al-Hadi also criticized traditional religious practices such as the counting of prayer formulas with the prayer chain and the making of amulets, citing the Koran. In June 1933, he spoke out against the holding of the Mandi Safar, a joyous festival of ritual bathing in rivers and the sea celebrated by the Malays on the last Wednesday of the month of Safar. In December 1929, in an article for al-Ikhwān, he made fun of the way the Friday sermon is delivered in Malay mosques: A man who had veiled himself like a woman would climb the minbar and deliver his sermon in a language that no one, including himself, could understand.

In addition, al-Hadi opposed Sufi practices. He rejected the Sufi meeting houses known as Rumah Suluk and disapproved of women and men performing spiritual exercises there together. He regarded meditation (murāqabat Allāh), as practiced by some Muslim groups in Malaya, as a religious practice that had no basis in Islam because, in his view, the Prophet Muhammad had not taught it.

His dispute with the Sufis reached a climax in 1933, when the head of the Tarīqa Taslīm visited him with some of his followers and asked him to confirm that the doctrines of his group were correct. Sayyid Shaykh al-Hadi agreed to this request on the condition that the followers of the movement would accept his findings based on the Qur'an and hadiths. He then undertook research on the group together with ʿAbdallāh al-Maghribī and Tāhir Jalāl ad-Dīn. After the investigation was completed, a gathering of 10,000 Muslims was convened in the Friday mosque of Jelutong, where al-Hadi gave a three-hour lecture informing those present of the results of the investigation. The deputy leader, eight leading members and numerous supporters of Taslīm were also present at the meeting. Based on al-Hadi's statements, it was unanimously declared at the meeting that all the rulings in the Taslīm group's book were wrong and contradicted the teachings of Islam because they constituted shirk. In order not to segregate and expose the followers of the group who attended the meeting, all those present were asked to perform the Tauba and say the Shahāda. Sayyid Shaykh reported on the incident in detail in his newspaper Saudara in October 1933, but without mentioning how the Taslīm group reacted to the assembly's decisions.

=== Politics ===
==== Assessment of the Malay ruling elites ====
Although Sayyid Sheikh had had much contact with the traditional Malay ruling elites in his youth, especially in Riau, and had also been patronized by them, he frequently expressed his displeasure with them in his writings and blamed them for the weakness of the Malays. Thus, in 1906 in al-Imām, he accused the Malay rulers of spending their time gambling and satisfying lustful desires and neglecting their duties. According to al-Hadi, they spent their money on useless and extravagant things that benefited neither the state nor the nation.

One of the few Malay rulers who was viewed favorably by al-Hadi was Sultan Abu Bakar of Johor (r. 1862–1895). In his article Ash-Sharaf: Kemuliaan atau Kehormatan (Sharaf: Pomp or Honor?) of February 1908, al-Hadi cites him as a particularly positive example of a native ruler, but emphasizes that this sultan is not remembered for his fine shirts, imposing palace and medals, but for his glorious and honorable efforts to save an Islamic state that had fallen "into the jaws of a ferocious tiger". He had founded a government for his community and his descendants and had kept this government independent throughout his life, while many others had sold their states cheaply in crowded markets. Later, in the context of criticizing Malay wedding customs, al-Hadi praised the sultans of Johor and Kedah, who had held only very simple ceremonies at the marriages of their children.

The Malay population was accused by al-Hadi of relying too much on their rulers and leaders and not taking their fate into their own hands. He admonished the readers of his journal al-Ikhwān that they should not be deceived by the pomp and titles of their authorities, as they were the real cause of all evil and the greatest helper of the nations they oppressed. In an article he published in July 1927, he accused the Muslim elites of being uncritical of the rulers, glorifying their deeds and courting them with titles of honor, while conversely forgetting the needs of their societies and showing no interest in improving their situation.

In an earlier article for al-Imām, al-Hadi had already polemicized against the sultans' theological advisors called Penghulu and the traditional Malay leaders. There he exclaimed:

O God, we were loyal to our penghulus and our traditional leaders, and they have led us astray. O God, bring upon them the double suffering we have suffered, along with the greatest of Your curses. They are the heads and we are the tails. They are the seeds of all calamities and sufferings. They are the prodigals and the kings of the ignorant. They are the source of all infirmities and misfortunes. [...] All the wealth of the country, acquired by squeezing the blood of the poor, has been used for their benefit, in contradiction to the laws of Islam, wasted on the bowls of pseudo-religious ceremonies, in the glasses of alcoholic drinks, at Joget and other entertainments

— Sayyid Shaykh in al-Imām July 1907

==== Changing attitudes towards British colonial rule ====
In the articles that Sayyid Shaykh published in the journal al-Imām, he was predominantly critical of the European colonial powers. In the very first issue of this journal, dated September 16, 1906, he described in an article entitled Angan-angan Berbetulan dengan Hakikat (Fantasies that are in tune with reality) how he was carried high into the sky in a dream and looked down with tears in his eyes on Sumatra, Java, the Philippines and Malaya, all of which were in the hands of foreign powers. In the same article, he accused the British of not doing enough to educate the inhabitants in their colonies. In December of the same year, he accused the Europeans of leading Oriental peoples into slavery, of being duplicitous and disrespectful towards Oriental rulers, and of closing the doors to knowledge. Ismail Fajrie Alatas says that the story of Rocambole with the Indian treasure also contains indirect criticism of the British colonial power, because it tells that the British bring the local Muslim population under their control by making them dependent on opium and also by making treaties with local rulers.

Sayyid Shaykh expressed a more positive view of the British in his journal al-Ikhwān. In the second issue of the magazine, which appeared on October 16, 1926, he praised the prosperity in British Malaya, which was "the result of the good government of the British", but at the same time he advised the Malays that the British only wanted to attract European capital and open banks "to enable other people to buy saddles to put on your backs so that you work your land for their profit". The various buildings and fertile gardens did not belong to them, but to another people. However, with regard to the backwardness of the Malay rulers, which he criticized, he emphasized the positive aspects of British rule:

Leave behind you the grumblings of men who like to discuss lordly policy together, for you are not people of this field. Rather, at this time, you should thank Britain for the gift of freeing you from the slavery of your rulers and giving you laws that will never be an obstacle to you on the path of progress.

— Sayyid Shaykh in al-Ikhwān, October 16, 1926.

Although al-Hadi had been relatively friendly towards the British in his article, he received a letter in response from Pendeta Za'ba, who criticized him for secretly stirring up hatred towards the British. Za'ba questioned the sincerity of al-Hadi's praise for British colonial rule in Malaya, characterizing it with the Malay phrase tanam tebu di bibir mulut (literally "to grow sugarcane on the lip") as "grating sweet wood".

Sayyid Shaykh then rejected this accusation in another article and repeated his praise for the colonial power. He went so far as to compare the British to God's army, whose arrival in Malaya brought blessings to the population:

In fact, the English are an army of God, the Lord of the Worlds (rabb al-ʿālamīn)', who has commanded them to come here to deliver us from the darkness, the prison of ignorance, injustice, wickedness and cruelty of our own rulers, for the English are wise, respectful of the rules of governance, world peace and prosperity.

— Sayyid Shaykh in November 1926 in al-Ikhwān

The Quranic statement in Sura 21:105 that God's righteous servants would one day inherit the earth, Sayyid Shaykh thought he could refer to the English. The Malay Muslims should use the benefits of justice, freedom and peace for their own betterment and then support the British government in its administration, which would ultimately benefit themselves. Sayyid Shaykh considered the very idea of asking the British to leave the country a sin, because the moment they left the country, in his view, there was a danger that other nations would invade. This was because, firstly, the Malays were not yet able to control their own country and, secondly, they did not have the power to prevent an enemy from invading. If the Malays under the rule of the British, who themselves ate meat, did not get to eat the same meat, they could at least suck the bones.

Al-Hadi was very positive about British rule in the last years of his life and expressed in his novels his admiration for their ability to organize (peraturan) the state. As can be seen from an article he published in March 1929 in response to the impending ban on al-Ikhwān and Saudara in Kelantan, he even regarded the British as a protecting power for his reform project. In the article, al-Hadi stated that Kelantan had only entered the modern world from a state of barbarism with the implementation of British jurisprudence, but that there were still people there who believed in the words of religious authorities who had never opened their eyes to modernity and free thought, as he had done under the protection of British rule. Al-Hadi expressed confidence at the end of the article that the government "under the flag of His Royal Highness Georg V" would preserve freedom of thought and remove anything that stood in the way of its exercise, "even if these obstructions came under the guise of religion".

==== Malay nationalism ====
Although Sayyid Shaykh himself was of Arab-Hadramite descent on his father's side, he clearly considered Malaya to be his homeland and regarded the Malays as his ethnic group. His journal al-Ikhwān was addressed to "all his brothers in the Malay world" (sekalian ikhwannya di dalam alam Melayu). When he spoke of the land of the Malays, he meant the whole Malay Peninsula and the surrounding islands that make up the Malay Archipelago. In Saudara, al-Hadi reproached the "eminent personalities of Islam" (orang besar-besar Islam) in Malaya for sitting idly in the assemblies and having their hands kissed instead of working to improve the situation of their countrymen.

Sayyid Shaykh repeatedly expressed his concern for the continued existence of the Malay people. In September 1906, for example, he expressed his fear that the Malays could suffer the same fate as the indigenous peoples of America and Australia. Only God could save them from this. And in October 1930, he published an article in al-Ikhwān entitled "Will the Malays be wiped out?" (Adakah Kaum Melayu ini Akan Hapus?), in which he warned the Malays that their non-participation in the economic sphere could jeopardize their very survival.

In an article entitled Teriak Sa-benar ("The real cry") In October 1926, he appealed to the Malays to "finally awake from their slumber". It was necessary to shout out as if one had been beaten up with the greatest violence. Screaming and shouting, he wrote, were better than laughing and applauding, for how could one allow another people to become the guardian of one's own people in the territory of the Homeland Homeland, Watan, was a very important political concept for Sayyid Shaykh, which also played a significant role in his novels. Thus, in the preface to Hikayat Anak Dara Ghassan, he explains that this narrative contains symbolic allusions that make readers love the fatherland (waṭan) and the nation. Calls for national revival and devotion and love for the fatherland are also woven into the plot of Faridah Hanum.

Although the Muslims of mixed Arab-Malay descent were among the pioneers of Malay nationalism, this movement later turned against them as tendencies to no longer recognize Arab-Malay Muslims as Malays emerged within them in the early 1930s. Sayyid Shaykh warned the Malays against such tendencies in May 1930, arguing that they still needed the help of their Arab brethren as they were the wealthiest and most influential group among the Malay Muslims.

==== Chinese as a danger and role model ====
Sayyid Shaykh saw the Malays as threatened above all by the Chinese. In his article published in al-Imām in July 1907, he warned the Malays that they had taken over almost all economic functions in their society. Addressing his readers, he wrote:

Let us pause for a moment, dear readers. Look around you in any kampung ('village'), the place of Muslims. If you look left and right, front and back, you will see that those who sell rice to the kampung residents are Chinese. Those who sell vegetables are Chinese. Those who sell fish are Chinese. Those who carry water from house to house are Chinese. And those who mow and sow for the majority of the kampung are also Chinese

— Sayyid Shaykh on July 12, 1907, in al-Imām

In his article "The True Outcry" of October 1926, Sayyid Shaykh warned the Malays that it was a mistake to allow themselves to be so sheltered that they would die of hunger without clothing if "a foreign people" did not provide food, clothing, utensils, and housing. They would never have provided the Malays with all these valuables if it had not been their intention "to fatten us up so that they could make use of us as they do of machinery and factories". As he clarified in a subsequent article, by the "foreign people" he also meant the Chinese.

Sayyid Shaykh was very concerned that the strong Chinese presence could become a threat to the Malays. He wrote in an article in October 1928:

Do you not see that in the country where you live, all the inhabited places have already been completely or largely taken away from the possession of the Muslim countrymen and have almost completely fallen into the hands of the Chinese? If this continues towards the mainland, where should the Muslim brothers flee to?"

— Sayyid Shaykh: Saudara, October 27, 1928

In February 1931, al-Hadi took issue with and rejected the statement of a Chinese who had claimed that the Malay Peninsula was not the land of the Malays, but his land.

While Sayyid Shaykh saw the Chinese as a threat, he was also impressed by the determination with which the Chinese immigrants had built up wealth in Malaya, becoming large landowners and taking control of the economy. In the same article of October 1928 for Saudara, in which he expressed his fears of Chinese foreign infiltration, he commended their example to the Muslims and expressed his astonishment that the Muslims were inferior to the Chinese in diligence, intelligence, knowledge, charity, dignity, solidarity and charity, although the Koran urged them to improve. He also praised the way the Chinese used their money to build schools for the needy and advised Muslims to follow their example. Since the Muslims had already failed to follow the commandments of their religion with regard to the dissemination of knowledge and had also not successfully followed either the European or the Japanese model, the time had now come to at least follow the example of the Chinese with regard to the education and rearing of children.

=== Work ethic and social Darwinism ===
In the second half of the 1920s, al-Hadi repeatedly emphasized the necessity of education (pengetahuan) and work (bekerja) in his writings, whereby this was partly followed by Social Darwinism considerations followed. In September 1926, in his opening article in the journal al-Ikhwān, he characterized the present as a "time of education and work": every nation that takes care of education and works will hold a dominant position, but every nation that is stupid and lazy will perish. It was necessary to take care of these two things oneself and then to teach one's own children to love them from an early age. At the end of 1926, in his response to az-Za'ba, he said: "This worldly life is a battlefield that promises superiority and victory to anyone who works hard and possesses knowledge." In an article he published in June 1930, he tried to prove that Islam encourages people to exert themselves and work, citing several Qur'anic verses. Laziness, he claimed in the article, is harmful to health and defiles the soul.

al-Hadi's social Darwinist orientation is particularly evident in the article Will the Malays be wiped out? (Adakah Kaum Melayu ini Akan Hapus?), which he published in al-Ikhwān in October 1930. In it, he stated that in exploiting their colonies, the Europeans were ultimately only following their natural disposition, the Fitra given by God, as described in Sura 30:30. This natural instinct led them to strive for superiority. According to Sayyid Shaykh, this behavior corresponds to the principle of survival of the fittest described by Charles Darwin: God had instilled in all human beings the will to progress and achieve perfection. Those who were too weak in this competition for superiority would perish. With such statements, with which he attempted to reconcile Darwinian theory and Islam, Sayyid Shaykh simultaneously provided a justification for colonial capitalism.

=== Education and school system ===
==== Shortcomings of traditional religious education ====
Until the early 20th century, traditional religious education among the Malays mainly took place in pondoks. A pondok usually consisted of a surau, the teacher's house and several wooden huts in which the students lived. Al-Hadi was very critical of this institution. In an article he published in al-Ikhwān in February 1928, he expressed that while it was gratifying to see young men striving for religious knowledge, he judged that the pondok students were being taught by Muslim scholars to behave in a manner that was in stark contradiction to the teachings of Islam. He expressed his disapproval of the fact that in Kedah the Pondok students were taken by their teachers to the villages for funerals and celebrations on the occasion of the prophet's birthday so that they could recite prayers there and then be rewarded with alms payments and participation in the feast. Sayyid Shaykh expressed doubts in the article that such gatherings, where the pondok disciples appeared like mosque servants (lebai)' in white caps, were of any benefit to the Muslim community or the country, and called on the Shaykh al-Islām of Kedah to combat "these dangerous gatherings".

In connection with his remarks on the meaning of the ritual prayer, al-Hadi complained that Muslim children were brought up by teachers who had a good command of the complicated movements and postures of the prayer and could also recite the invocation formulae, but had not learned its real meaning. Prayer, he believed, could only change a person's personality for the better if what was read and the purpose of the prayer were understood. In this context, he criticized the fact that 90 percent of Malay Muslims or more did not understand the meaning of the readings they recited five times a day in their prayers. To overcome the problem, al-Hadi recommended that those who imparted Islamic knowledge to Muslim children should also explain to them the meaning of the readings so that Muslims would not remain "in backwardness and shame".

==== The call for the establishment of Anglo-Malay schools ====
Al-Hadi was of the opinion that if Muslims did not adhere to the European education system, they would remain backward forever. The article "The Real Cry" from October 1926 already contained the call for the Malays to quickly establish schools for their children. Recognizing the difficulties Malays faced when admitted to English schools, he called on Malays to establish Anglo-Malay schools in his newspaper Saudara in December 1929. In February 1930, he repeated this call in al-Ikhwān In Anglo-Malay schools, both Malay, "the language of the country's children", and English, the language of the colonial rulers and administration, were to be taught. Above all, religious doctrines were to be taught in Malay, initially translated from Arabic sources into Malay. As far as English was concerned, the school was to follow the government's regulations for private schools so that the certificates issued in the school would be recognized by the government.

Al-Hadi made his proposal against the backdrop of the failure of the many private Arab schools founded in Malaya during his time: despite the large amount of time and money that the students had spent on them, they had not fulfilled the objectives of their foundation. He himself had two madrasas in Singapore and Malacca, which had to close again. In his opinion, the main reason for the failure of the Arab schools was the weakness of their teachers. In his opinion, the Arab schools could only be successful if high expenses were incurred for them, which were much higher than those for Anglo-Malay schools. Regarding the difficulties to be overcome in the new project, he exclaimed: "Delete the word 'impossible', because the term 'impossible' has been completely eradicated from the dictionary of the path of progress of people who want to live in freedom and dignity in their country."

As Sayyid Shaykh's appeal met with little response from his reading public, he wrote a second article in March 1930 in which he fiercely attacked the Malay elites, accusing them of not paying enough attention to organizing a proper education for their children. Sayyid Shaykh also saw this educational project as a necessity for the success of the Malay "struggle for survival". In October 1930, he wrote:

If a native people have the same education as the invaders, follow the same method that these invaders use in educating their children, venture into the same trades and professions, use the same shield in the struggle of life, then they will certainly survive and keep pace with the foreigners

— Sayyid Shaykh in al-Ikhwān October 16, 1930

Sayyid Shaykh quoted the traditional prophet's words as evidence that Islam calls on the believers to acquire the knowledge of foreign nations: "Seek knowledge, even if it is in China". Sayyid Shaykh considered it absurd to restrict education to fiqh, as was customary among Islamic religious scholars. He demanded in the article that students should receive "every kind of knowledge that enables Muslims to keep up with other people in life". One could only benefit from Tauhīd and Fiqh if one also understood and appreciated the various other types of knowledge. In February 1931, Sayyid Shaykh reiterated his position and justified the necessity of learning English by saying that it was the key to knowledge and progress.

==== Jawi script as a symbol of Islamic identity ====
Although al-Hadi advocated the teaching of European education, he also believed that the Malays should adhere to the Jawi script, which was based on the Arabic script. In September 1933, he defended this script in an opinion article as a pillar of Islamic identity and culture and as a bulwark against communism. As a negative example, he referred to the situation in Java, where the children only knew the Latin script taught by the Dutch. Sayyid Shaykh also rejected the written fixation of the Qur'an in Latin script on the grounds that the Latin script could not accurately reproduce the Arabic sounds and the meaning of the words could be completely distorted when read by persons who were not proficient in Arabic.

=== Emancipation of women ===
Al-Hadi also strongly advocated the improvement of the status of women in Malaya in his writings.

==== Social and intellectual equality of women ====
In his book on the nature of women, published in 1930, al-Hadi rejected the widespread traditional view that women were inferior to men in status and intellect. He argued that Sura 49:13 shows that people, regardless of their gender, have the same ability to recognize God and are equally accountable under His law. The equality of men and women is also proven by the hadith "Women are the second halves of men" (innamā n-nisāʾ šaqāʾiq ar-riǧāl). In his view, the Qur'anic statement in Sura 2:228 that men are one step above women does not mean that men are superior to women. Rather, the statement must be understood in the sense of superiority, just as the head is higher than the stomach; but even if the head is higher than other parts of the body, it cannot live without the stomach. Al-Hadi regarded the degradation of Muslim women in the present as a consequence of social and political developments within the Muslim community from the Abbasid period onwards. As proof, he referred to the early Islamic period, in which, in his view, women enjoyed great respect and played an important role in public life in both peacetime and wartime.

The theme of women's emancipation also plays an important role in the novel Faridah Hanum. In it, Al-Hadi tells how Faridah's father was filled with the belief that women were inferior according to Islam because he was under the influence of unqualified and ignorant religious teachers who taught Muslims such things. Al-Hadi rejects this teaching and emphasizes that the true Islamic teaching on women is completely contrary to what these unfortunate religious teachers had spread. The novel ends with a reference to the speeches of Hudā Shaʿrāwī and with a condemnation of such misogynistic traditions that contradict Islam:

The ignorance of women and the laws applied towards them today in most Muslim societies disregard the intention and commandments of Islam. The reason for this is the ignorance of the intention of this noble religion among most of its followers. It is due to the fact that they only follow the old customs of their ancestors. End: Sayyid Shaykh at the end of his novel Faridah Hanum

In his romance novels, al-Hadi generally portrayed the heroines as educated intellectual women fighting for their rights and position in society and also proficient in European foreign languages. Nūr ul-ʿAin is described as a princess who "possesses every kind of inner adornment, from the various sciences to all kinds of entertainment arts, highly celebrated pantun poems and the forms of Arab sociability that were common at the time". The modern image of women that al-Hadi propagated also included women being allowed to smoke. The romance novel Hikayat Taman Cinta Berahi contains an illustration of Iqbal Hanum smoking a cigarette.

==== Necessity of women's education ====
Another area to which al-Hadi devoted much attention was women's education. In his book on the nature of women, al-Hadi tried to prove that Islam guarantees Muslim women the right to education. In doing so, he referred to the alleged hadith, according to which the search for knowledge is a duty for every Muslim and every Muslim woman (ṭalab al-ʿilm farīḍa ʿalā kull muslim wa-muslima). He also pointed out that the West had only achieved progress and development because education there was imparted equally to men and women. Al-Hadi also called for Muslims in general and Malays in particular to stop glorifying uneducated and ignorant women because "dull and ignorant mothers whose knowledge is limited to the bedroom and kitchen cannot produce good and victorious children." He dismissed fears that knowledge corrupts the good character of women.

In October 1930, al-Hadi again emphasized in an article in his magazine al-Ikhwān that a change in the upbringing of girls in Malaya was absolutely necessary. This had to be geared more towards the development of their mental abilities. He argued that the progress of a community depends essentially on the progress of the women in that community.

In March 1930, when al-Hadi learned that a young Malay woman named Zainun bint Sulaiman, who had received an education in both Malay and English and had been entrusted with the supervision of girls' schools in the state of Johor, was about to start a women's magazine entitled Bulan Melayu, he wrote an enthusiastic welcome note in al-Ikhwān, exclaiming:

Women, women, women! You are the honor of life, the guide to goodness. You are the magicians who so wisely sow the seeds of progress and the splendor of life after men strive, after they have learned their true meaning (from you).

— Sayyid Shaykh in al-Ikhwan m March 1930

In a letter to al-Hadi, Zainun binti Sulaiman expressed her hope that his book Alam Perempuan would open the eyes of those Muslims who did not grant Muslim women the rights to which they were entitled according to Islamic doctrine.

==== Better status of women in marriage law ====
Al-Hadi also dealt with issues of marriage law. The aim of the novel Faridah Hanum was to show that women should be given the right to choose their future husband, and that forced marriages are unacceptable from an Islamic perspective. The Hikayat Puteri Nur ul-ʿAin was intended to illustrate the dangers of hasty forced marriage and criticized the institution of Tahlīl marriage, which is called Cina Buta ("blind Chinese") in Malay. Al-Hadi stated in the book that cina buta was tantamount to adultery with the permission of the Qādī. In the preface, he expresses his hope "that all the things that happen in this story will be for the benefit and warning of the male and female readers and will make all people who belong to our religion reconsider the matter that is of the utmost importance for the lives of married people".

==== Limits of emancipation ====
One point that al-Hadi did not discuss was the permission of polygamy. Ibrahim bin Abu Bakr attributes this to the fact that he himself lived a polygamous life for a time. During his time in Singapore, he was probably married to three women at the same time. One area in which al-Hadi clearly advocated the superiority of men over women was the household and family life. Thus, the female characters in the romance novels also accepted that the man was considered the head of the family; the woman should obey him as long as he did not command her to do anything that violated Islamic teachings.

Sayyid Shaykh also considered the unequal treatment of women in Islamic inheritance law to be justified. In the Hikayat Faridah Hanum, he has the father of Shafik Efendi, who appears as an Islamic modernist, give a long speech in defense of Islamic inheritance law, in which he explains that male heirs receive twice as much as women according to Islamic rules because they are obliged to financially support their wives and female relatives.

== Sayyid Shaykh's house in Jelutong ==
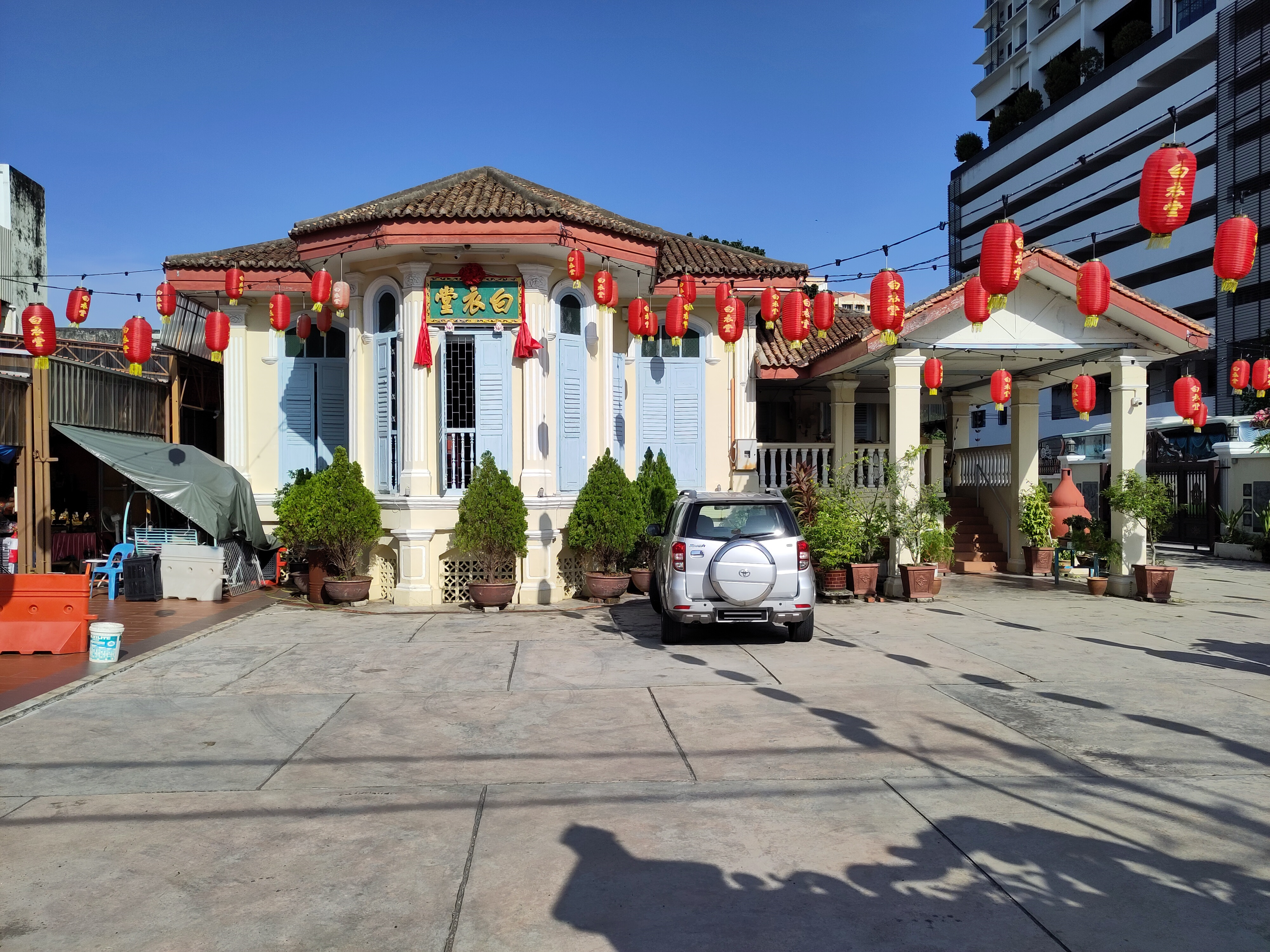
The former home of Sayyid Shaykh al-Hadi in Jelutong, which today serves as a place of worship for the Chinese Buddhist community

Sayyid Shaykh's house at Jalan Jelutong No. 410, whose plan Sayyid Shaykh designed himself was acquired by a Chinese after his death. Since 1947, it has served the Chinese Buddhist community as a Guanyin temple. Sohaimi Abdul Aziz, professor of literature at Science University Malaysia, advocated in 2007 that the house be turned into a documentation center for Malay culture on Penang in order to pay tribute to Sayyid Shaykh al-Hadi.

== Ancestry ==
Sayyid Shaykh al-Hadi came from the Arab Bā-ʿAlawī family on his father's side, whose original homeland is the Hadramaut. The Bā-ʿAlawī are Saiyids, i.e. descendants of the Prophet Muhammad. An ancestor of Sayyid Shaykh had immigrated from Hadramaut towards the end of the 18th century and settled in Malacca, one of the oldest and most important Malay ports. His grandfather Hasan ibn as-Saqqāf (also spelled al-Sagoff), who had already been born in Kampung Hulu, a district of Malacca, had married a local Malay woman, like many other Arab immigrants. Sayyid Shaykh's father Ahmad al-Hadi was born from his marriage to her in 1837. He later became active in agriculture and trade and married in 1858 Dhu l-Hijjah, a woman from the royal family of Malacca, with whom he had five children. The family owned lands near Malacca. Due to his mixed Arab-Malay descent, Sayyid Shaykh al-Hadi is classified as belonging to the Arab Peranakan group.

== Literature ==
Collection of writings by and about Sayyid Shaykh

- Alijah Gordon (ed.): The real cry of Syed Sheikh al-Hady, with selections of his writings by his son Syed Alwi al-Hady. Malaysian Sociological Research Institute, Kuala Lumpur 1999 (Digitalisat) – Besprechung von Farish Noor In: Journal of the Malaysian Branch of the Royal Asiatic Society. Band 73/2, 2000, S. 104–109.

Sekundärliteratur

- Sohaimi Abdul Aziz: Syed Syeikh al-Hadi. Cendekia dan Sasterawan Ulung. Penerbit Universiti Sains Malaysia, Pulau Pinang 2003.
- Sohaimi Abdul Aziz: Syed Syeikh Al-Hadi: Sejauh mana kita menghormati dan menghargai ketokohan dan sumbangannya in Sohaimi Abdul Aziz (ed.): Dari Tanjung Penaga ke George Town: Membongkar Sejarah Negeri Pulau Pinang. Ministry of Culture, Art and Heritage, Malaysia, Pulau Pinang 2007, p. 73–88.
- Ibrahim bin Abu Bakar: Islamic modernism in Malaya as reflected in Hadi’s thought. PhD Dissertation, McGill University, 1992. Digitalisat
- Ibrahim bin Abu Bakar: Islamic modernism in Malaya: the life and thought of Sayid Syekh al-Hadi, 1867–1934. University of Malaya Press, Kuala Lumpur 1994.
- Ibrahim bin Abu Bakar: Al-Hādī’s political thought. In: Hamdard Islamicus. Band 18/1, 1995, p. 99–110.
- Ibrahim Abu Bakr und Rosnani Hashim: Sayid Shaykh al-Hadi. Reform of Islamic Education in Malaya in Rosnani Hashim (ed.): Reclaiming the conversation: Islamic intellectual tradition in the Malay Archipelago. Other Press, Kuala Lumpur 2010. p. 91–114.
- Farid Alatas: Ideology and utopia in the thought of Syed Shaykh al-Hady. Working Paper, Department of Sociology, National University of Singapore, Singapore 2005. – Wiederabdruck als Syed Sheikh Ahmad Al-Hady, 1867–1934 and the reform of Malay society, ideological and utopian dimensions. In: Wazir Jahan Karim (ed.): Straits Muslims: diasporas of the northern passage of the Straits of Malacca. Straits G. T., George Town 2009. p. 169–180.
- Ismail Fajrie Alatas: Circumlocutory Imperialism: The Concept of Watan in the Thoughts of Syed Shaikh bin Ahmad al-Hady. In: Studia Islamika. Band 12/2, 2005, p. 247–297 (Digitalisat).
- Muhammad Ali: Islam and colonialism: becoming modern in Indonesia and Malaya. Edinburgh University Press, Edinburgh 2016. p. 59–64.
- Siti Amirah binti Abdullah: Al-Hadi, Syed Sheikh bin Ahmad in Loh Wei Leng et alii (eds.): Biographical Dictionary of Mercantile Personalities in Penang Think City & MBRAS, Penang, Kuala Lumpur 2013. p. 20f (Digitalisat).
- Azyumardi Azra: The Transmission of al-Manārs Reformism to the Malay-Indonesian World. The Case of al-Imām and al-Munīr. In: Stéphane A. Dudoignon, Komatsu Hisao, Kosugi Yasushi (eds.): Intellectuals in the Modern Islamic World. Transmission, Transformation, Communication. Routledge, Abingdon 2007. p. 143–158. Here p. 147–149.
- Mujahid M. Bahjat, Basil Q. Muhammad: The Significance of the Arabic-Modelled Malay Novel Hikayat Faridah Hanum. In: Journal of Arabic Literature. Band 41, 2010, p. 245–261.
- Christine Campbell: The Thread of Eroticism in Faridah Hanom, an early Malay Novel by Syed Sheikh al-Hadi In: Jan van der Putten, Mary Kilcline Cody (eds.): Lost Times and Untold Tales from the Malay World. NUS Press, Singapore 2009. p. 257–267.
- Ooi Keat Gin: Historical Dictionary of Malaysia. Scarecrow Press, Lanham (Maryland) u. a., 2009. p. 16.
- Alijah Gordon: Riau: The Milieu of Syed Shaykh’s Formative Years & the Aspirations of the Subjugated Umma In: Gordon (ed.): The real cry of Syed Sheikh al-Hady. 1999, p. 1–68.
- Syed Alwi al-Hady: The Life of my Father in Gordon (ed.): The real cry of Syed Sheikh al-Hady. 1999, p. 69–83.
- Syed Mohamed Alwy al-Hady: Syed Sheikh: Through the Prism of a Child’s Eyes & the al-Hady Clan. In: Gordon (ed.): The real cry of Syed Sheikh al-Hady. 1999, p. 85–108.
- Virginia Matheson Hooker: Transmission Through Practical Example: Women and Islam in 1920s Malay Fiction. In: Journal of the Malaysian Branch of the Royal Asiatic Society 67/2 (1994) 93–118.
- Virginia Matheson Hooker: Writing a New Society: Social Change through the Novel in Malay. KITLV Press, Leiden 2000.
- Abdul Rahman Haji Ismail: Syed Syeikh al-Hadi: Penggerak Kebangkitan Melayu Abad ke-20. In: Sohaimi Abdul Aziz: Syed Syeikh al-Hadi. Cendekia dan Sasterawan Ulung. Penerbit Universiti Sains Malaysia, Pulau Pinang 2003. S. 9–36.
- Yahaya Ismail: Sayid Syekh Ahmad al-Hadi: Pembuka Zaman Baru Dalam Bidang Novel di Bumi Pulau Pinang. In: Abdul Latiff Abu Bakar: Warisan Sastera Pulau Pinang. Selangor Press, Kuala Lumpur 1985. S. 52–78.
- Michael Francis Laffan: Islamic Nationhood and Colonial Indonesia. The umma below the winds. Routledge, London / New York, 2003. S. 149–151.
- Ahmad Murad Merican: Telling Tales, Print and the Extension of Media: Malay Media Studies beginning with Abdullah Munsyi through Syed Shaykh al-Hady and Mahathir Mohamad. In: Kajian Malaysia. Band 24, 2006, S. 151–169 (Digitalisat).
- Mohammad Redzuan Othman: Idea Kemajuan dalam Pemikiran dan Perjuangan Sayyid Shaykh al-Hadi. In: M. R. Othman u. a. (Hrsg.) Sejarah pembinaan negara bangsa. Penerbit Universiti Malaya, Kuala Lumpur, 2006. p. 125–144.
- Mohammad Redzuan Othman: Egypt’s Religious and Intellectual Influence on Malay Society In: Katha, Centre for Civilizational Dialogue. Band 1, 2005, p. 26–54 (Online).
- William R. Roff: The mystery of the first Malay novel (and who was Rokambul?). In: Bijdragen tot de Taal-, Land- en Volkenkunde. Band 130, 1974, S. 450–464, doi:10.1163/22134379-90002689.
- William R. Roff: The Origins of Malay Nationalism. Yale University Press, New Haven / London 1967.
- Talib Samat: Syed Sheikh Al-Hadi: Sasterawan Progresif Melayu. Dewan Bahasa dan Pustaka, Kuala Lumpur 1992.
- Talib Samat: Syed Syeikh al-Hadi: Kehidupan dan Pandangan Hidupnya yang Terpancar dalam Karya Sastera In: Sohaimi Abdul Aziz: Syed Syeikh al-Hadi. Cendekia dan Sasterawan Ulung. Penerbit Universiti Sains Malaysia, Pulau Pinang 2003, p. 73–98.
- Linda Tan: Syed Shaykh: His Life and Times. In: Gordon (ed.): The real cry of Syed Sheikh al-Hady. 1999, S. 109–162.
- Wan Suhana binti Wan Sulong: Saudara (1928–1941): Its Contribution to the Debate on Issues in Malay Society and the Development of a Malay World-view. PhD thesis, University of Hull 2003 (Digitalisat).
- Zaba (Zain al-'Abidin bin Ahmad): Modern Developments. In: R. O. Winstedt: A History of Malay Literature. In: Journal of the Malayan Branch of the Royal Asiatic Society. Band 17/3, 1940, p. 1–243. Here p. 142–162.
- Hafiz Zakariya: Sayyid Shaykh Aḥmad al-Hādī's Contributions to Islamic Reformism in Malaya In: Ahmed Ibrahim Abushouk, Hassan Ahmed Ibrahim (eds.): The Hadhrami Diaspora in Southeast Asia. Identity Maintenance or Assimilation? Brill, Leiden 2009. p. 203–224.
- Hafiz Zakariya: Colonialism, Society and Reforms in Malaya: A Comparative Evaluation of Shaykh Tahir Jalaluddin and Syed Shaykh Ahmad Al-Hady. In: Intellectual Discourse. Band 25, 2017, p. 477–501 (Digitalisat).
