= Muhammad 'Uthman Jalal =

Egyptian author and translator (1829–1898)

Muḥammad ʿUthmān Jalāl (Arabic: محمد عثمان جلال, romanized: Muḥammad ʿUthmān Jalāl; 1829–1898) was an Egyptian dramatist, translator and author.

Jalal (known as Galal) was the son of a minor official of Turkish ancestry who had married an Egyptian woman.

He was one of the most prolific adapters of French plays and literary texts by La Fontaine, Bernardin de Saint-Pierre, Molière, and Racine, as well as plays by Carlo Goldoni. He rendered several plays by Molière, Racine and Goldoni in the colloquial Egyptian Arabic, including a version of Molière's Tartuffe, Al-Shaykh Matlūf. He also translated Molière's Le Médecin malgré lui which was published in three issues of Rawdat Al Madaris. It was not completely featured in the magazine due to the obscenity of the language.

== Bibliography ==
- Bardenstein, Carol (2005). Translation and transformation in modern Arabic literature: the indigenous assertions of Muḥammad 'Uthmān Jalāl. Wiesbaden: Harrassowitz. ISBN 3-447-05198-1. OCLC 62701157.
