= Rifa'a at-Tahtawi =

Egyptian academic (1801–1873)

- رفاعة الطهطاوي
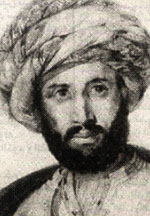
- Born: October 15, 1801; Tahta, Egypt Eyalet, Ottoman Empire
- Died: May 27, 1873 (aged 71); Cairo, Khedivate of Egypt, Ottoman Empire

Rifa'a Rafi' at-Tahtawi (Arabic: رفاعة رافع الطهطاوي, romanized: Rifāʿa Rāfiʿ aṭ-Ṭahṭāwī; (Note: Also transcribed as Tahtawy or Tahtaoui.) 1801–1873) was an Egyptian writer, teacher, translator, Egyptologist, and intellectual of the Nahda (the Arab renaissance).

One of the first Egyptian travellers to France in the nineteenth century, Tahtawi published in 1834 a detailed account of his 5-year-long stay in France, Takhlis al-ibriz fi talkhis Bariz ('The Extrication of Gold in Summarizing Paris'), and from then on became one of the first Egyptian scholars to write about Western culture in an attempt to bring about a reconciliation and an understanding between Islamic and Christian civilizations.

In 1835, he founded a School of Languages in Cairo, and he was influential in the development of science, law, literature, and Egyptology in 19th-century Egypt. His works influenced those of many later scholars such as Muhammad Abduh.

== Life ==
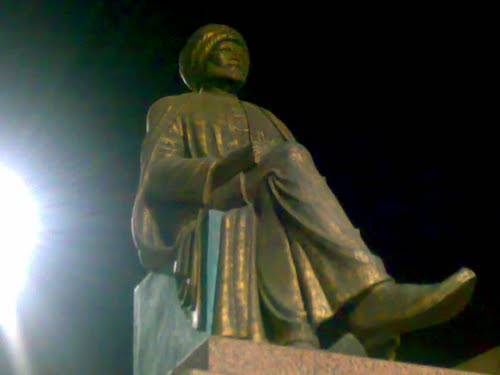
Tahtawi memorial before Sohag University, Sohag

Tahtawi was born in 1801 in the village of Tahta, Sohag, the same year the French troops evacuated Egypt. He was an Azharite recommended by his teacher and mentor Hasan al-Attar to be the chaplain of a group of students Mohammed Ali was sending to Paris in 1826. Originally intended to be an imam (an Islamic religious guide), he was allowed to associate with the other members of the mission through persuasion of his authoritative figures. Many student missions from Egypt went to Europe in the early 19th century to study arts and sciences at European universities and acquire technical skills such as printing, shipbuilding and modern military techniques. According to his memoir Takhlīṣ al-ʾibrīz fī talkhīṣ Bārīz, Tahtawi studied ethics, social and political philosophy, and mathematics and geometry. He read works by Condillac, Voltaire, Rousseau, Montesquieu, and Bézout among others during his séjour (visit) in France.

In 1831, Tahtawi returned home to be part of the statewide effort to modernize the Egyptian infrastructure and education. He undertook a career in writing and translation, and founded the School of Languages (also knowns as School of Translators) in 1835, which become part of Ain Shams University in 1973. The School of Languages graduated the earliest modern Egyptian intellectual milieu, which formed the basis of the emerging grassroots mobilization against British colonialism in Egypt. Three of his published volumes were works of political and moral philosophy. They introduced his Egyptian audience to Enlightenment ideas such as secular authority and political rights and liberty; his ideas regarding how a modern civilized society ought to be and what constituted by extension a civilized or "good Egyptian"; and his ideas on public interest and public good. Tahtawi's work was the first effort in what became an Egyptian renaissance (nahda) that flourished in the years between 1860 and 1940.

Tahtawi was a member of the Educational Council attached to the newly established Ministry of Education in the late 1860s. He edited the magazine of the Ministry of Education entitled Rawdat Al Madaris between 1870 and 1873. He died in Cairo in 1873.

== Islamic modernism ==
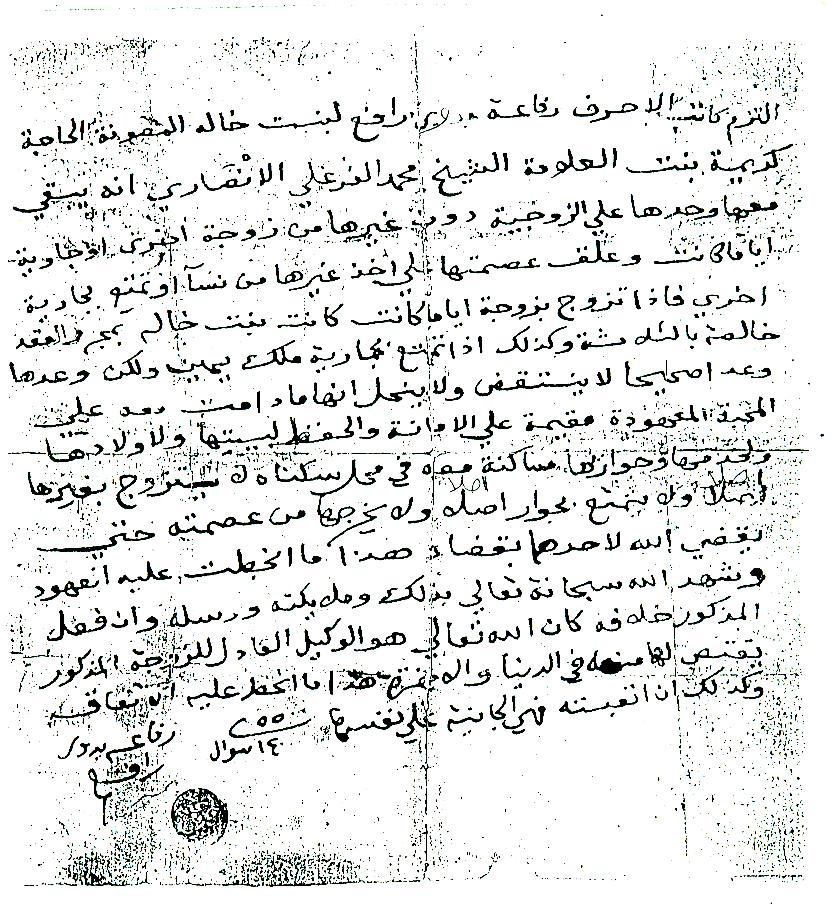
Tahtawi's agreement with his wife not to marry another woman

Tahtawi is considered one of the early adapters of Islamic modernism. Islamic modernists attempted to integrate Islamic principles with European social theories. In 1826, Tahtawi was sent to Paris by Mehmet Ali. Tahtawi studied at an educational mission for five years, returning in 1831. Tahtawi was appointed director of the School of Languages. At the school, he worked translating European books into Arabic. Tahtawi was instrumental in translating military manuals, geography, and European history. In total, Tahtawi supervised the translation of over 2,000 foreign works into Arabic. Tahtawi even made favorable comments about French society in some of his books. Tahtawi stressed that the principles of Islam are compatible with those of European modernity.

Tahtawi, like others of what is often referred to as the Nahda, was spellbound by French (and Western in general) culture in his books. Shaden Tageldin has suggested that this produced an intellectual inferiority complex in his ideas that aided in an "intellectual colonization" that remains till today among Egyptian intelligentsia.

Tahtawi rejected socialism and the labour movement, while supporting Egyptian policies progressive for their time.

== Works ==
A selection of his works are:

=== Tahtawi's writings ===
- Takhlīṣ al-ʾibrīz fī talkhīṣ Bārīz (تخليص الإبريز في تلخيص باريز 'The Extrication of Gold in Summarizing Paris'), written during Tahtawi's stay in France, published in 1834.
- The methodology of Egyptians minds with regard to the marvels of modern literature, published in 1869 crystallizing Tahtawi's opinions on modernization.
- The honest guide for education of girls and boys, published in 1873 and reflecting the main precepts of Tahtawi's educational thoughts, and was a response to a request from the Egyptian Ministry of Education to "compose a book on the humanities and pedagogy that can be used for the education of both boys and girls.”
- Tawfik al-Galil insights into Egypt's and Ismail descendants' history, the first part of the History Encyclopedia published in 1868 and tracing the history of ancient Egypt till the dawn of Islam.
- A thorough summary of the biography of Muhammad published after Tahtawi's death, recording a comprehensive account of the life of Muhammad and the political, legal and administrative foundations of the first Islamic state.
- Towards a simpler Arabic grammar, published in 1869.
- Grammatical sentences, published in 1863.
- Egyptian patriotic lyrics, written in praise of Khedive Said and published in 1855.
- The luminous stars in the moonlit nights of al-Aziz, a collection of congratulatory writings to some princes, published in 1872.

=== Tahtawi's translations ===
- The history of ancient Egyptians, published in 1838.
- The Arabization of trade law, published in 1868.
- The Arabization of the French civil law, published in 1866.
- The unequivocal Arabization approach to geography, published in 1835.
- Small-scale geography, published in 1830.
- Metals and their use, published in 1867.
- Ancient philosophers, published in 1836.
- Principals of engineering, published in 1854.
- Useful metals, published in 1832.
- Logic, published in 1838.
- Sasure's engineering, published in 1874.
- General geography.
- The French constitution.
- On health policies.
- On Greek mythology.

== See also ==
- List of Egyptologists
- Muhammad Khaznadar

== Sources ==
- Reid, Donald Malcolm (2002). Whose Pharaohs? Archaeology, Museums, and Egyptian National Identity from Napoleon to World War I. University of California Press. ISBN 978-0520240698.
- Vatikiotis, P. J. (1976). The Modern History of Egypt (Repr. ed.). Weidenfeld and Nicolson. ISBN 978-0297772620.
- Gelvin, J. L. (2005). The Modern Middle East: a History. Oxford University Press. ISBN 978-0195167894.
