= Rawdat Al Madaris =

Educational magazine in Egypt (1870–1878)

- Editor: Rifaa Rafi Al Tahtawi
- Categories: Education magazine
- Frequency: Bimonthly
- Founder: Ministry of Education
- Founded: 1870
- Final issue: 1877
- Country: Khedivate of Egypt
- Based in: Cairo
- Language: Arabic
- OCLC: 28815667

Rawdat Al Madaris (Arabic: روضة المدارس المصرية, lit. 'School Garden'), also known as Rawdat Al Madaris Al Misriyah, was a bimonthly education magazine which was published in Cairo, Egypt, between 1870 and 1877. It was the first Egyptian and Arab publication which specifically focused on education.

== History and profile ==
Rawdat Al Madaris was established by the Ministry of Education led by the reformist Ali Pasha Mubarak in 1870. It was started part of Khedive ismail's reforms. In the first issue its goal was stated as "the consolidation of the educational system and the shaping of the minds of the students and their sensibility." Therefore, it attempted to broaden knowledge which was to be expressed in an easily understood language.

The editor of Rawdat Al Madaris was Rifaa Rafi Al Tahtawi from its start in 1870 to 1873. The magazine played a significant role in the introduction of his views. Tahtawi's son, Ali Fahmi, worked in Rawdat Al Madaris as a director. The magazine was headquartered in Cairo and came out bimonthly. It was distributed freely to students, and teachers were asked to subscribe to the magazine.

Rawdat Al Madaris produced many articles on school reform in Egypt and shaped the basis of this reform. Its reform approach was based on Jamal al-Din al-Afghani's ijtihad view. The magazine supported the teaching of botany, geography and history and that of traditional subjects. Ali Pasha Mubarak, Rifaa Rafi Al Tahtawi, Abdullah Fikri and İsmail Al Falaki were some major contributors of Rawdat Al Madaris. Contributors of the magazine also included university professors and undergraduate students who published articles on various scientific subjects, including chemistry. In addition, the magazine featured an Arabic translation of Molière’s Le Médecin malgré lui by Muhammad 'Uthman Jalal in 1871. However, it was published in only three issues of the magazine due to the obscenity of the language used by Jalal. The magazine also covered Arabic poetry contributing to its revival.

Rawdat Al Madaris folded in 1877.
