= Madrasat al-Alsun =

Madrasat al-Alsun مدرسة الألسن

Location
- Cairo; Egypt

The Madrasat al-Alsun (Arabic: مدرسة الألسن, lit. 'School of Languages') was created by Muḥammad ʿAlī in 1835.

== History ==
The school's administration in Egypt underwent a reorganization in 1836, and Rifāʿa Rāfiʿ aṭ-Ṭahṭāwī was appointed head of the Madrasat al-Alsun in 1837.

At the Madrasat al-Alsun, the European system of education combined with the methods of the ʿulamāʾ.

In 1851, under ʿAbbās I, the school's activities were halted. The school resumed activities in 1863 under Ismaʿīl, and aṭ-Ṭahṭāwī was made its director.

Under aṭ-Ṭahṭāwī, in both of his tenures, the school trained translators and translated European texts into Arabic. It was a pioneering institution in the ideology and methodology of taʿrīb, or Arabization. The selection of texts to be translated—in fields such as geography, history, medicine, military sciences, and politics—was the responsibility of aṭ-Ṭahṭāwī in the service of the State and the dynasty of Muḥammad ʿAlī.

In the process of translating these texts, the staff of the Madrasat al-Alsun established the principles of "rendering foreign languages into a clear, modern Arabic idiom" and conceived new Arabic vocabulary to suit novel technical terms and ideas. The Madrasat al-Alsun was, therefore, fundamental to the Arab nationalist movements of the later half of the 19th century as it made possible their use of the "continuing vitality and centrality of Arabic in their nationalist programs."
