= Hasan al-Attar =

Egyptian scholar

Shaykh Hasan al-Attar (Arabic: حسن العطار; 1766–1835) was a Sunni Shafi'i scholar, Grand Imam of al-Azhar from 1830 to 1835. A "polymathic figure", he wrote on grammar, science, logic, medicine and history. Hassan al-Attar was appointed Sheikh of al-Azhar in 1830 and became one of the earliest reformist clerics in Ottoman Egypt. He was a forerunner of Egypt's national revival, and his legacy was a generation of Egyptian modernists like his disciple Rifa al-Tahtawi. He advocated the introduction of sciences such as logic and modern astronomy, and wrote the first modern history of Mohammed's tribe, the Quraish. He was to suffer greatly for his modernizing beliefs.

His first contact with foreign (non-Muslim) knowledge came during the French occupation of Egypt (1798–1801). Fearing for his safety after the French withdrawal, he left Cairo for Istanbul. There he studied and read voraciously, from 1802 through 1806, when he continued his studies in Alexandretta (today İskenderun), İzmir and Damascus, returning to Egypt in 1815. He was the first director of the new medical college, defending the necessity of corpse dissection, which he had observed in the Cairo veterinary college, against the non-experimental, theoretical teachings of eleventh-century Avicenna, discarded centuries ago in Christian Europe. While he was a successful lecturer at al-Azhar University, his time there was marked by continual conflict with ulemas opposing Western influences, leading him at times to conduct classes in his home. The tensions only became worse with his appointment as rector. He died within four years.

== Creed ==
According to Peter Gran, professor of history at Temple University, his first phase, as an Ash'ari, ended early in his stay in Turkey. Thereafter, his study of logic and other rational science drew him toward a Maturidite position. During the 1830's, he wrote on ijtihad from a Maturidite outlook.
