= Najm al-Din al-Tufi =

Islamic Scholar Najm ad-Din Sulayman bin Abd al-Qawi Al-Tufi

Personal life
- Born: 657 AH / 1259 CE or 673 AH / 1276 CE Baghdad
- Died: 716 AH / 1316 CE Hebron
- Region: Cairo, Qus
- Main interest: Maslaha

Religious life
- Religion: Islam
- Denomination: Sunni
- Jurisprudence: Hanbali
- Creed: Athari

Muslim leader
- Influenced by: Ibn Taymiyya Shihab al-Din al-Qarafi
- Influenced: Rashid Rida Salafiyya Jamal al-Din Qasimi

Najm ad-Dīn Abū r-Rabīʿ Sulaymān ibn ʿAbd al-Qawī aṭ-Ṭūfī (Arabic: نجم الدين أبو الربيع سليمان بن عبد القوي الطوفي) was a Hanbali scholar and student of Ibn Taymiyya. He referred to ibn Taymiyya as "our sheikh." Most of his scholarship deals with Islamic legal theory and theology. His writings did not attract a large following of Hanbalis, though his Mukhtasar al-Rawdah has been commented upon up to the 16th century.

He is known for his writings on maṣlaḥa, in that averting harm is a general obligation which can only be set aside by a specific legal ruling, such as the hudud punishments. His noteworthy legal theory on maṣlaḥa would later influence future Islamic reform movements, especially in the past century.

== Life ==
At-Tūfī received his first upbringing in his birthplace and traveled to Baghdad in 1282, where he studied Arabic grammar, fiqh, hadith, and logic. After a one-year stay in Damascus in 704 AH, where he used to attend the classes of Ibn Taymiyya and al-Mizzī, he moved to Cairo in 1305, where he continued his training with various scholars and as a tutor (muʿīd) at Mansūrīya and Nāsirīya. In 1311 CE he was imprisoned in Cairo for a few days for accusations of Shia leanings and then banished from the city. After a stopover in Damietta went to the city of Qus in Upper Egypt, where he worked through the libraries and wrote his own books. In 1315 he undertook the Hajj, after which he stayed in Mecca for another year. In 1316 he traveled to Palestine, where he died in the city of Hebron.

=== Accusations of Shi'a Leanings ===
There is some scholarly debate on at-Tūfī's biography about his possible inclination for the Shi'a. During his stay in Mecca he was in active contact with the Imamite scholar al-Sakākīnī. In Cairo, he was accused of representing Shi'a positions and insulting the Prophet's companions. Al-Safadi (d.764/1362) reports that he renounced his associations with Shi'ism, however Ibn Rajab (d.795/1393) believed this renunciation was a form of taqiyya, accusing him of lying. Mustafa Zayd refutes this and quotes al-Tufi criticizing Shi'a doctrines and states that al-Tufi is not cited in any Shi'a biographies of scholars. Muhammad Said Ramadan al-Bouti argues otherwise and adds that al-Tufi's criticism of Shi'ism shows his volatile character.

== Maṣlaḥa ==
His most complete writings on maslaha are in his commentary on imam Nawawi's (d. 1277 CE) collection of 40 hadith, where he comments on the 32nd hadith, la darar wa la diraar. He states that this means to inflict harm (mafsada) upon someone else and to inflict harm in requital, therefore neither harm nor requital should be inflicted upon someone. He supports this hadith with verses from the Qur'an and other hadith that Allah does not intend to burden the believers, but gave us Islam for benefit and maslaha. In his opinion, this hadith has priority over all of the Shari'a except where punishment is stipulated, such as in the hudud, because they are stated to be obligatory in the revelation and are of stronger basis than the general statement of "there is no harm or requital of harm." He states that, by ijma, the harm caused by these punishments is permissible. Therefore averting harm is a general obligation which can only be superseded by a specific legal injunction.

al-Tufi states in his theory of maṣlaḥa that it can only apply to muamalat (social dealings) and ādāt (customs and habits) and not ibadat (worship) and muqaddarāt (fixed stipulations), because acts of worship can only be known via revelation whereas our minds can be applied to social dealings. He stated that if the Qur'an, hadith, and ijma contradict the maslaha, then the maslaha would take precedence. A major issue with his theory is that he was unable to provide any practical examples of applying his theory in his era, whereas imam al-Ghazali was able to provide clear examples of when it can override a text and where it cannot. This is one major reason that scholars like al-Ghazālī, al-Qarāfī and al-Shāṭibī had far more influential theories of maṣlaḥa than al-Tufi. It also appears that al-Tufi was influenced by the writings of imam al-Qarāfī, as he seems to exactly quote from him in citing the nineteen evidences of Islamic law.

=== Salafiyya movement ===
Tufi's interpretation of maslaha did not take hold until the early 20th century when the Arab Salafiyya scholars Jamal ad-Din al-Qasimi (1866–1914 C.E) and Muḥammad Rashīd Riḍā (1865–1935 C.E) revived his concept of maslaha in the Islamic magazine al-Manar to counter secular reformers. Al-Tufi's theory of maslaha was appealing to the Salafiyya reformers as it opened the door for them to "update" the Shari'a in a dynamic world. At that time, Islamic law was being replaced by Western models of legal systems after the breakup of the Ottoman Empire and creation of modern nation states in the Middle East and North Africa. Most of these new nation states created legal codes based on European law, such as French and British law. In the 1950s, for example, Egypt and Tunisia abolished their Shari'a courts and turned to secular law.

These Salafiyya reformers wanted to equip Muslims sufficiently to challenge the European influence and to "catch up" with the West. They rebuked the obscurantist Ulema as an obstacle to progress and advancement. This theory of maslaha provided the avenue for keeping the Shari'a and Ulema (Islamic scholars) relevant in their changing world, by reviving a traditional doctrine; rather than something perceived as foreign.

Tufi's theory helped Rashid Rida prove that the Shari'a is not antithetical to reason and served Rida's advocacy of using maslaha to derive rulings. Additionally, it helped Rida and al-Qasimi to depart from the four Sunni madh'habs (schools of thought) as well as their corresponding usul al-fiqh, as it freed them from blind-following the fatwas and methodologies of the classical scholars (taqlid) and blindly adhering to a particular madhhab. Through this, they also sought to keep Islamic scholarship relevant and provide an alternative to the growing European-influenced secular jurisprudence and reforms of the Muslim states at the time. Rida also blamed the weakness of the Muslim world in comparison to Western hegemony and colonialism on factionalism (Hizbiyya) between the various schools of thought. By proposing maslaha as a universally accepted legal standard, Rida desired to unite the Muslim world on one school of thought and strengthen them against Western domination.

Rida was also clear that general principles cannot supersede clear-cut texts. He stated that a soundly transmitted Scriptural text can only be superseded by a specific text which is more superior. It could also be superseded by general texts of Qurʾan and authentic hadiths that permit believers to prevent damage to themselves or to commit prohibited actions in a state of emergencies; such as endangerment of life. Rida asserted that the permission was valid only during the situation of extreme necessity; and that the degree of allowance was proportional to the scope of necessity. Maintaining that Revealed texts are superior to Maslaha; Rida's legal approach towards the revealed texts and maṣlaḥa was based on the criterion and mechanisms elaborated by classical jurists such as al-Shatibi and Al-Tufi.

Shortly after, Rida's revival of maslaha was criticized by Al-Kawtharī, al-Būṭī, and other Islamic scholars. Some scholars likened it to a type of utilitarianism similar to the ideas of Jeremy Bentham and John Stuart Mill, and he was accused of using the fallible human mind to restrict Allah's rulings (ahkam). Wael Hallaq states that al-Tufi's theory was too vague, since he never defined its scope or concept in sufficient detail, and therefore his theory was "inferior to the average theoretical discourse."

== Works ==
Of the more than 50 works that at-Tūfī wrote, 19 have been preserved.

- Mukhtasar al-Rawdah, an abridgement of Rawdat al-Nazir by Ibn Qudamah
- al-Ta'līq 'alā al-Anājīl al-arba'a wa-al-ta'līq 'alā al-Tawrāh wa-'alā ghayrihā min kutub al-anbiyā' (Critical Commentary on the Four Gospels, the Torah and other Books of the Prophets)
- Kitāb at-Taʿyīn fī šarḥ al-Arbaʿīn ("Book of Specification for Commenting on the Forty"), commentary on an-Nawawī's collection of the forty hadiths, which was particularly popular in the 20th century. In this work, at-Tūfī, in connection with the commentary on the 32nd hadith “No harm and no harmful retribution” (lā ḍarar wa-lā ḍirār), developed his theory of the “common good” (maṣlaḥa), which generally weights more would have to be as text documents from Koran and Sunna. The modern Syrian scholar Jamāl ad-Dīn al-Qāsimī (1866–1914) published this text separately and provided it with his own explanations. Raschīd Ridā reprinted the text with the explanations of al-Qāsimīs in his magazine al-Manār in 1906, thereby making it known to a larger Islamic public. At-Tūfī's commentary was only fully edited in 1998 by Aḥmad Ḥāǧǧ Muḥammad ʿUṯmān.
- at-Taʿālīq ʿalā l-anāǧīl al-arbaʿa ("The Glosses of the Four Gospels") has been critically edited and translated by Lejla Demiri.
- al-Ǧaḏal fī ʿilm al-ǧadal ("The banner of cheerfulness about the science of dispute "). In this work, at-Tūfī formulated the idea that Jesus Christ could have been an angel and that was the reason why Christians ascribed divine qualities to him.
- al-Išārāt al-ilāhīya ilā l-mabāḥiṯ al-uṣūlīya, three-volume treatise on the Usūl al-fiqh .
- aṣ-Ṣaʿqa al-ġaḍabīya fī r-radd ʿalā munkirī al-ʿArabīya, defense of the Arabic language against its critics.
