= Maslaha =

Public welfare in Islamic jurisprudence

Maslaha or maslahah or maslahat (Arabic: مصلحة, lit. 'benefit, public interest') or Manfa'ah (منفعة, meaning: benefit, gain, advantage or interest), comes from the term "Salihat" (good deeds, also linked to Islah and Istislah), is a concept in Sharia (Islamic divine law) regarded as a basis of law. It forms a part of extended methodological principles of Islamic jurisprudence (uṣūl al-fiqh) and denotes prohibition or permission of something, according to necessity and particular circumstances, on the basis of whether it serves the public interest of the Muslim community (ummah). In principle, maslaha is invoked particularly for issues that are not regulated by the Qur'an, the sunnah (the teachings and practices of the Islamic prophet Muhammad), or qiyas (analogy). The concept is acknowledged and employed to varying degrees depending on the jurists and schools of Islamic jurisprudence (madhhab). The application of the concept has become more important in modern times because of its increasing relevance to contemporary legal issues. The opposite term of maslaha is mafsada (مفسدة, harm). Islamic politics is itself predicated on maslaha, and is such changeable, as it must respond to the exigencies of time. The term is different from bidah.

== Etymology ==
=== In Quran ===
According to Mehmet Gormez, in a speech in 5th General Assembly organized in Istanbul by the International Union of Muslim Scholars, the verbal roots of words maslaha and mafsada both are mentioned together in Quran in chapter al-Baqarah's verse no 11, and also in verse 11:117 and 2:205 differently, where all refers towards equal meaining of maslaha and mafsada.

And when it is said to them, "Do not cause corruption (تُفۡسِدُوۡا, tufsidu) on the earth," they say, "We are but reformers (مُصۡلِحُوۡنَ, muslihun).

— Quran 2:11

And when he goes away, he strives throughout the land to cause corruption (لِیُفۡسِدَ, yufsidu) therein and destroy crops and animals. And Allah does not like corruption (ٱلۡفَسَادَ, al-fasad).

— Quran 2:205

And your Lord would not have destroyed the cities unjustly while their people were reformers (مُصْلِحُونَ, muslihun).

— Quran 11:117

=== In Hadith ===
A hadith is also used to be referred in case of maslaha and mafsada where Islamic prophet Muhammad said about neither doing harm nor being harmed.

Abu Sa’id al-Khudri reported: The Messenger of Allah, peace and blessings be upon him, said, “Do not cause harm or return harm. Whoever harms others, Allah will harm him. Whoever is harsh with others, Allah will be harsh with him.”

— Source: al-Sunan al-Kubrá lil-Bayhaqī 11384, Grade: Hasan (fair) according to Al-Albani

Another hadith is used to determine the co-ordination between maslaha and mafsada is:

The Prophet (pbuh) said, "Leave me as I leave you, for the people who were before you were ruined because of their questions and their differences over their prophets. So, if I forbid you to do something, then keep away from it. And if I order you to do something, then do of it as much as you can."

— (bukhari:7288)

Muhammad forbade disobedience to prohibitions unless absolutely necessary, but he conditioned compliance to mandates on capacity. This shows that when obligations conflict, avoiding prohibitions takes precedence over performing them. When a substantial harm exceeds a gain, this adage is applicable. However, seeking the advantage is given priority if the harm is insignificant in comparison to the significant benefit that results from an activity. Based on the hadith, in situations where Maslahah and Mafsada are equal or in conflict, the principle of "دار المفاسد مقدم على جلب المصالح" (Dar al-Mafasid muqaddamun ala jalbil masalih) or "avoiding harm takes precedence over gaining benefit" is followed.

== Terminology ==
There are several other equivalent or analogous concepts in Uṣūl al-fiqh, some of each associated with respective maddhabs. The concept of maqasid (aim or purpose) is comparable in a sense that connotes both the ultimate objective and the goal of the application of the Sharia. The concept of istislah is a related subject, which is employed by Imam Ahmad ibn Hanbal. The meaning of maslaha is "public interest", and the meaning of istislah is "to seek the best public interest", the Sharia's object and purpose. The concept of istihsan means equitable preference for finding solutions to the legal issues. The term is used by the Hanafi school of law, and according to the understanding, the results of qiyas can be overridden when it is considered harmful or undesirable. The term was also used by the Hanbali scholar Ibn Qudamah and by the Maliki jurist Averroes. The Shafi'i school does not recognize the application of maslaha, as it may open the door to the unrestricted use based on fallible human opinions, but it has a corresponding concept, istidlal, which is induced when necessary to avoid the strict application of qiyas.

== History ==
The concept was first clearly articulated by al-Ghazali (died 1111), who argued that maslaha was Allah's general purpose in revealing the divine law, and that its specific aims was preservation of five essentials of human well-being: religion, life, intellect, offspring, and property. Ghazali said in his book Al-Mustasfa that,

"The objectives and goals or maqasid of the Islamic Shariah are known from the Quran, Sunnah and Ijma', that which safeguards the five essentials is considered as maslahah and good, and that which harms the five essentials is considered as mafsada or evil and when two evils or harms come into conflict with each other, in such a way that one of them must be dealt with, then the aim and intention of the Shariah originator is to prevent the greater harm."

Although most classical-era jurists recognized maslaha as an important legal principle, they held different views regarding the role that it should play in Islamic law. Some jurists viewed it as auxiliary rationale constrained by scriptural sources and analogical reasoning. Others regarded the concept as an independent source of law, whose general principles could override specific inferences based on the letter of scripture. The latter view was held by a minority of classical jurists, but in modern times, it came to be championed in different forms by prominent scholars who sought to adapt Islamic law to changing social conditions by drawing on the intellectual heritage of traditional jurisprudence. Along with the analogous concept of maqasid, it has come to play an increasingly prominent role in modern time because of the need to confront legal issues that were unknown in the past. According to Ibn al-Qayyim, the measures taken to bring people closer to goodness (salaah) and keep them away from corruption (fasad), "Even if these matters are not permitted in the Quran or the Sunnah of the Prophet Muhammad, policy and politics of Shariah is formed by the combination of all of these."

== Types ==
The jurists divide maslahah into three categories:

- Maslahah mutabarah: Matters in which there is a clear Shariah ruling on determining maslahah.
- Maslahah mulgah: Matters in which, although considered maslahah, it is not maslahah.
- Maslaha mursalah (Arabic: مصالح مرسلة, lit. '"sent", "transmitted", "unbonded", "open" or "unconditional" public interest'): Matters in which there is no clear Shariah ruling on determining maslahah, and it varies according to place, time, and person.

== Usage ==
Maslaha was used in one sense by the Andalusian lawyer al-Shatibi (died 1388), who focused on the motivations behind the Islamic law. Regarding questions related to God, ibadat, humans should look to the Qur'an or the Sunnah for answers, but regarding the relationship between humans, mu'amalat, humans should look for the best public solution. Since societies change, al-Shatibi thought that the mu'amalat part of the Islamic law also needed to change.

Maslaha has also been used by several Muslim reformers in recent centuries. Ibn Abd al-Wahhab (died 1792) used maslaha in a few cases. The concept is more known to Islamic modernists. Among them, Muhammad Abduh is especially recognized for using the concept of maslaha as the basis for reconciling modern cultural values with the traditional moral code of Islamic law in the late 19th century. The Muslim Brotherhood, an Islamic modernist group, also invokes maslaha to explain their commitment to public welfare.

== Hierarchy ==
Abu Muhammad al-Maqdisi said, "The greatest maslaha is Tawheed and the greatest mafsada is Shirk."

Khalid bin Fathi, in his book Baghiyat al-Qasid fi Bayan Qawa’id al-Maslih wal-Mafsid (بغية القاصد في بيان قواعد المصالح والمفاسد, The Seeker’s Purpose in Explaining the Rules of Maslahah or Good and Mafsada or Evil), while classifying the Maslahah and Mafsada, said, “If Ibn Taymiyyah and other Imams, instead of pursuing the Maslahah of Tawheed, were to engage in something that is only a branch of it and without which it has no value, how much trouble would have befallen the land of Muslims. And the way to prevent the greatest evil, such as shirk and disbelief in Allah, is to prevent the lesser evils or those that are derived from it. The attainment of the greatest Maslahah, i.e., the Maslahah of Tawheed, depends on achieving it, and avoiding Mafsada is to avoid the Mafsada of associating partners with Allah Almighty.” Dependent on—this does not mean that there is any conflict between the benefits of Tawheed and other benefits or good, or between avoiding the harm of associating partners with Almighty Allah and avoiding disbelief in Him and other harms, because the Sharia is complete. It is necessary to give priority to Tawheed over Shirk and to promote it by ensuring all the basic and ancillary benefits and avoiding all the harms as much as possible. Because these are the foundation and pillars of Islam, on which Islam is founded, and they are the basis of human happiness in this world and the Hereafter. Whoever clings to them is successful and liberated, and whoever neglects them goes astray and is led by the misguided. Therefore, it is obligatory to give priority to and promote these two principles above all else. The reason for this is that if a person realizes these two principles—i.e., avoiding kufr and shirk and worshipping Allah alone without any partner—it will benefit him in this world and the Hereafter. "It will inevitably lead to all the desired benefits in the Hereafter.

Both Maslahah and Mafsada are divided into three levels: Hajiyat or obligatory (Farz and Haram Kabira), Dharuriyat or Necessary (Sunnah Mu'akkadah and Saghirah Gunah) and Tahsiniyat or Beautifying (Mustahab, Makruh) and all of them are determined in order of importance according to "Deen (Religion) > Nafs (Life) > Aql (Intelligence) > Nasl (Lineage) > Mal (Wealth)".

Fahad ibn Salih al-Ajlan said, An example of taking maslahah into account in Sharia is: Sharia rulings vary according to the degree of maslahah. Maslahah is more in wajib than mustahab. Mafsada is more in haram than makruh. Similarly, there is a hierarchy of minor and major in haram.

Al-Shatibi said, 'In the case of asking for or abandoning something, not all commands and prohibitions are of the same level. There is a difference in the consideration of the maslahah of accepting the command and prohibition and the mashadada of not accepting it.

Izz ibn Abdus Salam said, 'There is a distinction in the degree of maslahah-mafsada. According to the level of Maslaha, there will be a difference in status in the worldly view or in terms of virtue. And according to the level of Mafsada, the level of major and minor sins and the level of punishment in this world and the Hereafter will be determined. Among the types of Mafsada, the biggest one is the most harmful. And the smaller one is the less harmful. The level of major Mafsada gradually decreases and reaches a level of Mafsada, from which if it decreases a little, it will reach the highest level of Mafsada. And this is the second level. Again, the minor Mafsada gradually decreases and reaches a level from which if it decreases a little, it will reach the highest level of Makruh. And this is the second type of Mafsada levels. The harm of makruh gradually decreases to a point where it becomes permissible if it is lowered a little.

Qarafi said, 'The command of the Shariah seeks the 'dominant benefit'. And the prohibition of the Shariah seeks the 'dominant harm'. By following the lowest level of benefit, virtue is achieved. Then, as the benefit rises, it reaches such a high level that it reaches the highest level of mustahab. The level above it is the lowest level of wajib. And the lowest level of harm is the level of dislike or makruh. Then, as the corruption rises, it reaches the highest level of dislike, above which is the lowest level of haram.

Tufi said, 'The difference between praise, blame, goodness and punishment will depend on how much the good and bad deeds lead to benefit and corruption.

Qarafi said, 'All these texts demand that everyone abstain from the dominant mafsada, the non-dominant maslahah, the area where maslahah-mafsada is equal, and the area where maslahah-mafsada is not there (these four). Because these four types are not the best. Rather, the demand of leadership is to ensure pure and complete maslahah and to prevent complete and fundamental mafsada.

Istikharah is also prescribed for making Islamic political decisions that are not clearly resolved or beneficial in the Quran and Hadith. Abdullah al-Ghudayyan said, "If the benefit or harm, or the good or the bad, is not clear in a necessary or very important matter, then one should make istikhara." Tahir ibn Husayn advised his son Abdullah ibn Tahir after he became governor of Diyar Rabi'a:

Whenever an important matter befalls you, seek help from Allah by making istikhara and fearing Him... and make istikhara abundantly in all your affairs.

There is also another concept called Sadd al-Dharai, which means blocking the permissible or disputed means which has a visible possibility to lead to harms, such as avoiding doubtful things, not selling grape to someone who use it to make wine, not criticising other religion's idols, if there is a possibility to be itself backfired upon Allah and Muhammad etc.

Ad-darurat tubihul mahjurat (الضورات تبيح المحظورات) is a very famous fiqh maqsid (principle) of Islam. Its simple meaning is: "Extreme necessity or obligation makes forbidden things permissible." Example: If a person is stranded in a desert or a place where there is no halal food and he is facing the threat of death from hunger, then it becomes permissible for him to eat as much haram food (such as pork or dead animals) as is necessary to save his life.

Ruksat (رخصة) is the special concession or relaxation that the Sharia gives us to do something that is haram or prohibited in general, but temporarily in special circumstances or in a state of helplessness, it is called "Ruksat" or permission/exemption.

Ijtibar or Ijtirah (اضرار) means "a state of extreme helplessness" or "obligation". This condition has been mentioned in several verses in the Holy Quran. As Surah Al-Baqarah verse 173 states:

"But whoever is forced (ٱضْطُرَّ, a victim of extreme need or ijtirat) but is not disobedient or transgressor, there is no sin on him."

To prevent abuse of this principle, the Ulama have set some strict conditions:

1. Risk to life: The situation must be such that if one does not do the forbidden act, there is a fear of certain death or loss of body parts or fatal harm.
2. Not transgressing: In a state of extreme helplessness, the forbidden can only be taken to the extent of the minimum necessary to save life. Eating or consuming more than necessary is completely unlawful.

== Examples ==
=== Primary ===
==== Rashidun caliphs ====
Abu Bakr

- canonized the Quran into one volume.
- fought against those who refused to pay Zakat and appointed Umar ibn al-Khattab as his successor.

Umar ibn al-Khattab

- held officials accountable for misusing power and confiscated wealth.
- Punishments included pouring milk mixed with water
- suspending hadd for theft during famine
- approving the Companions' opinion of punishing groups for killing despite Quran's clear provisions.

Uthman ibn Affan

- distributed the authentic Quran and destroyed all other versions
- declared it permissible to inherit a woman whose husband had divorced her to deprive her of inheritance.
- gave bloodmoney on behalf of Ubayd Allah ibn Umar instead of giving him death penalty for killing Hormuzan, Jufayna and daughter of Abu Lulu.

Ali ibn Abi Talib

- held artisans and merchants responsible for the loss of goods stored with them

==== Later rulers and traditional jurists (fuqaha al-turathi) ====
- Hajjaj ibn Yusuf - Adding diacritical marks to the letters of Quranic texts for non-Arab readers.
- Malik bin Anas - gave fatwa for later rulers about not breaking and rebuilding Kaaba after Hajjaj ibn Yusuf following Abdullah ibn Zubayr to preserve Kaaba's honour.
- Before converting to Islam on a political contract basis, the neo-Muslim Ghazan, according to the Mongols' pre-Islamic Yasa custom, married his stepmother Bulghan Khatun Muazzema after his father's death, but after knowing the Islamic rule of forbiddance of marrying stepmothers, he ignored the Islamic law because of his weakness to stepmother, abandoned Islam and attempted to revert millions of Tatars of his land to their previous religion who converted to Islam following him and to massacre Syrian Muslims by overruling the previous contract. In order to dissuade him from doing so, some jurist of that time deceicively presented the marriage legal to him and encouraged him to remain in Islam, thus saving him from the great harm of genocide and apostasy, and giving Ghazan a long time and opportunity to realize his mistake.
- Ahmed I - The ongoing practice of allowing the ruling Ottoman ruler among his sons to kill other brothers for the sake of power, in the law called "Kanunname" initiated by Bayezid I and legally enacted by Mehmed II, was unanimously declared haram by all the scholars of the later era, and in 1617, Sultan Ahmed I abolished the fratricide law with the help of Sunullah Efendi and Mustafa Efendi and introduced the 'Ekbar and Ershad' (Ekberiyet) system of ascending the throne of the eldest member of the royal family and the 'Kafes' system of keeping the princes under surveillance.

==== Schools of law ====
- Scholars support sanctions on ignorant doctors, muftis, and fraudsters to protect people, and Malikis approve arrests and punishment under tajir, even without evidence.

Some of the instances of maslahah in the Maliki doctrine:

- The Imam's office is validated by an oath of allegiance to the mafdul (inferior), preventing chaos.
- If the public treasury runs out of funds, the Imam may impose additional taxes on the wealthy to prevent corruption.
- If lawful living is inaccessible, Muslims can engage in unlawful occupations, but only to the extent necessary (dharurat).

There is also:

- If the wali does not agree after the marriage without the consent of the wali, the husband becomes permanently forbidden.
- In a situation where there is no alternative way to avoid adultery, masturbation, which is normally or generally considered haram, should be declared permissible only for that specific time.
- * If a hadith whose narration is weak (da'if khafif) is supported by more than one good or strong narration (hasan or sahih) hadith, then the less weak hadith is considered good or hasan (hasan li ghairihi, good because of (the support of) others) or acceptable in support of the given hadiths, for example, most of the hadiths of Ibn Lahi'a.

=== Contemporary ===
- Not breaking Green Dome made by Qalawun, temporarily in spite of being against sahih hadith, in order to prevent fitna and chaos among muslims
- Get a medical checkup for sexually transmitted diseases before marriage.
- Vaccination for the performers of Hajj and Umrah

== See also ==
- Public interest
- Istihlal
- Istishab
- Common good
- Al-Siyasa al-Shar'iyya fi Islah al-Ra'i wa al-Ra'iyya
- Mutaween
- Najm al-Din al-Tufi
- Bid'ah - new innovation in worship in Islam
- Moderation in Islam
- Ghulat
- Glossary of Islam
- Ikhtilaf
- Index of Islam-related articles
- Outline of Islam
- Uli al-amr
- Verse of Obedience
- Salat al-Istikharah

== Sources ==
- Brown, Jonathan A. C. (2009). "Maṣlaḥah". In John L. Esposito (ed.). The Oxford Encyclopedia of the Islamic World. Oxford: Oxford University Press. Archived from the original on October 11, 2017.
- Duderija, Adis (2014). Adis Duderija (ed.). Contemporary Muslim Reformist Thought and Maqāṣid cum Maṣlaḥa Approaches to Islamic Law: An Introduction. Vol. Maqasid al-Shari'a and Contemporary Reformist Muslim Thought: An Examination. Springer.
- Gleave, R.M. (2012). "Maḳāṣid al-Sharīʿa". In P. Bearman; Th. Bianquis; C.E. Bosworth; E. van Donzel; W.P. Heinrichs (eds.). Encyclopaedia of Islam (2nd ed.). Brill. doi:10.1163/1573-3912_islam_SIM_8809.
- Opwis, Felicitas (2007). Abbas Amanat; Frank Griffel (eds.). Islamic Law and Legal Change: The Concept of Maslaha in Classical and Contemporary Legal Theory. Vol. Shari'a: Islamic Law in the Contemporary Context. Stanford University Press.
- Ziadeh, Farhat J. (2009). "Uṣūl al-fiqh". In John L. Esposito (ed.). The Oxford Encyclopedia of the Islamic World. Oxford: Oxford University Press. doi:10.1093/acref/9780195305135.001.0001. ISBN 9780195305135.
