= Ulama =

Muslim legal scholars

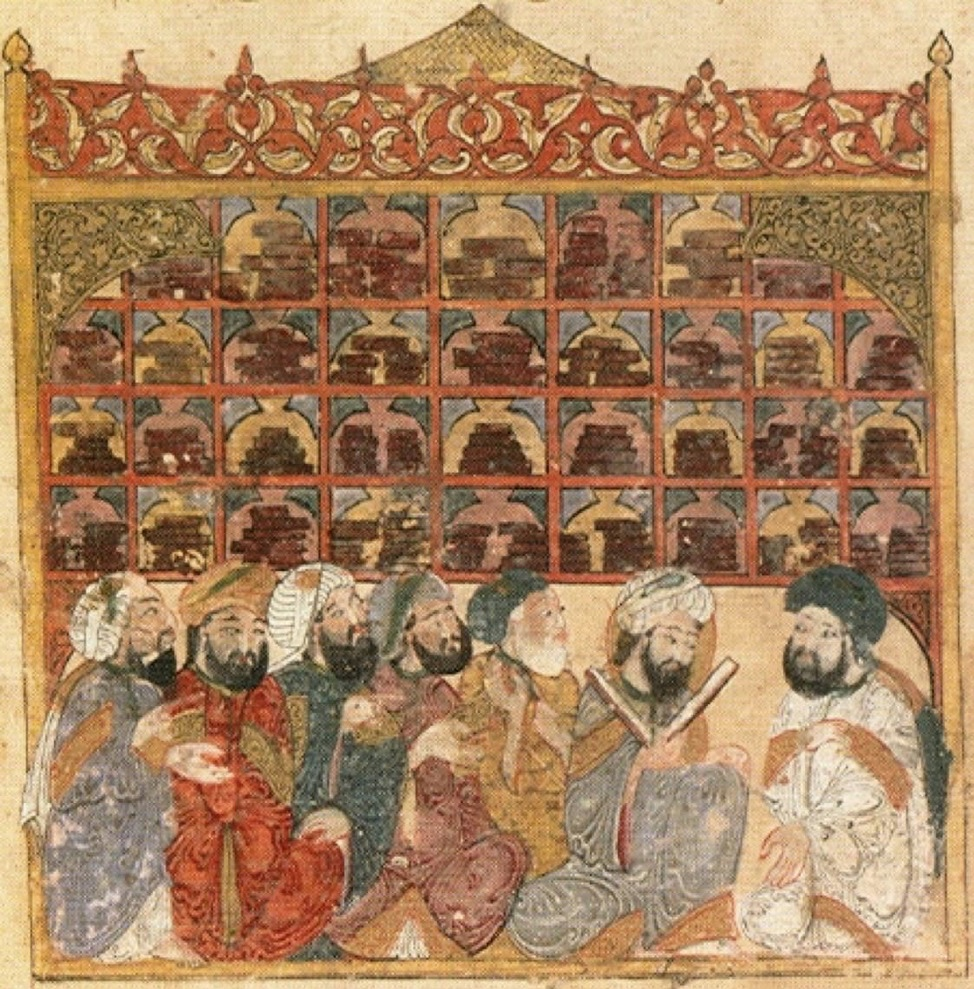
Scholars at an Abbasid library. Maqamat of al-Hariri. Illustration by Yahyá al-Wasiti, Baghdad, 1237.

In Islam, the ʿulamā (US: /ˈuːləmɑː/ OO-lə-mah; also spelled ulema; Arabic: علماء, romanized: ʿulamāʾ; IPA: [ʕu.la.maːʔ]; lit. 'the learned ones'; singular عالم, ʿālim; [ʕaː.lim]), also known as Shuyukh or Mawlawi, are scholars and judges of Islamic doctrine and law. They are considered the guardians, transmitters, interpreters and legislators of religious knowledge in Islam.

"Ulama" may refer broadly to the educated class of such religious scholars, including theologians, canon lawyers (muftis), judges (qadis), professors, and high state religious officials. Alternatively, "ulama" may refer specifically to those holding governmental positions in an Islamic state.

By longstanding tradition, ulama are educated in religious institutions (madrasas). The Quran and sunnah (authentic hadith) are the scriptural sources of traditional Islamic law.

== Traditional way of education ==
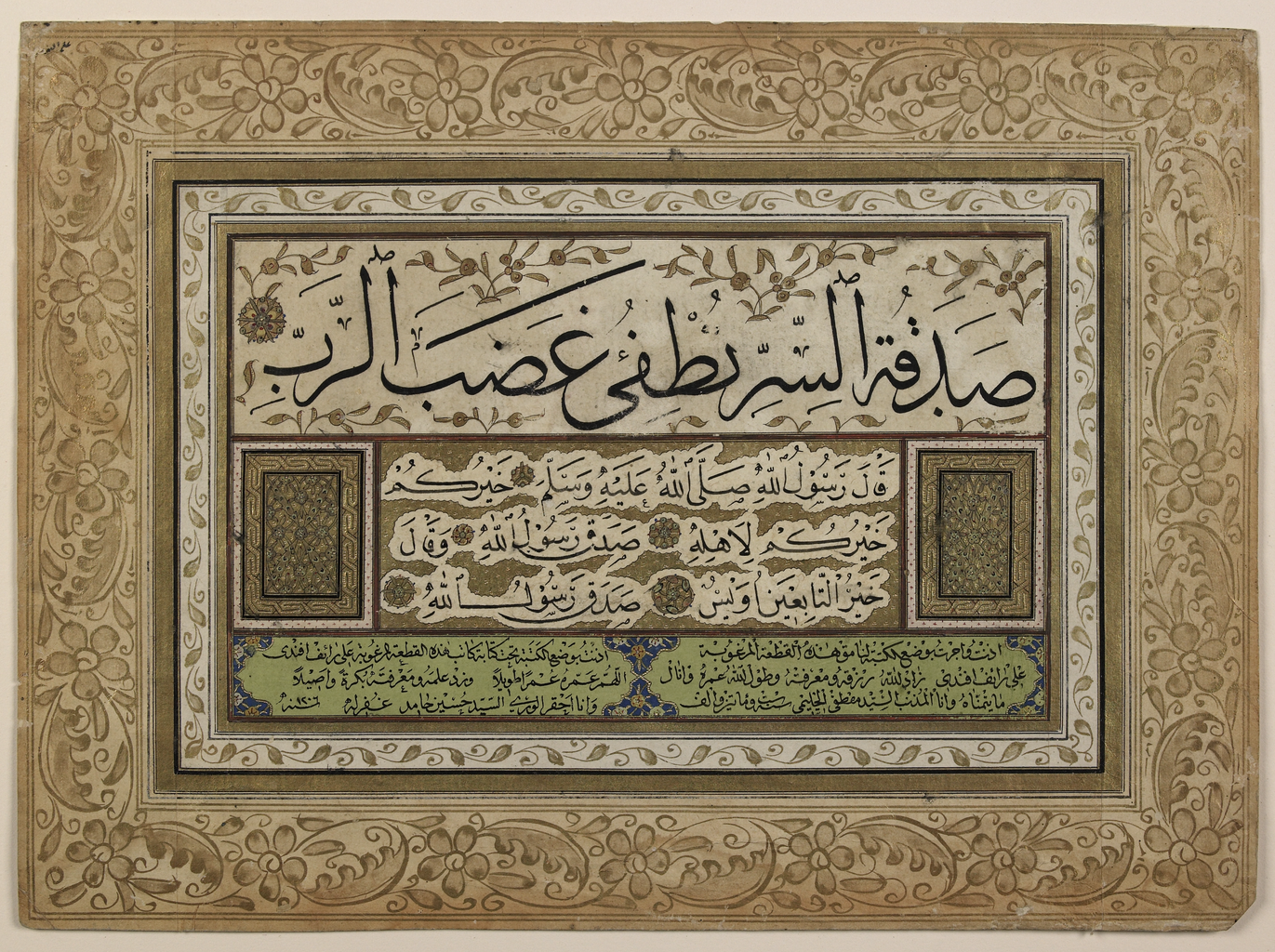
Ijazah (diploma of competency) in Arabic calligraphy, written by 'Ali Ra'if Efendi in 1206 AH (1791 AD)

Students of Islamic doctrine do not seek out a specific educational institution, but rather seek to join renowned teachers. By tradition, a scholar who has completed their studies is approved by their teacher. At the teacher's individual discretion, the student is given the permission for teaching and for the issuing of legal opinions (fatwa). The official approval is known as the ijazat at-tadris wa 'l-ifta (lit. 'license to teach and issue legal opinions'). Through time, this practice has established a chain of teachers and pupils who have become teachers in their own time.

== Places of learning ==
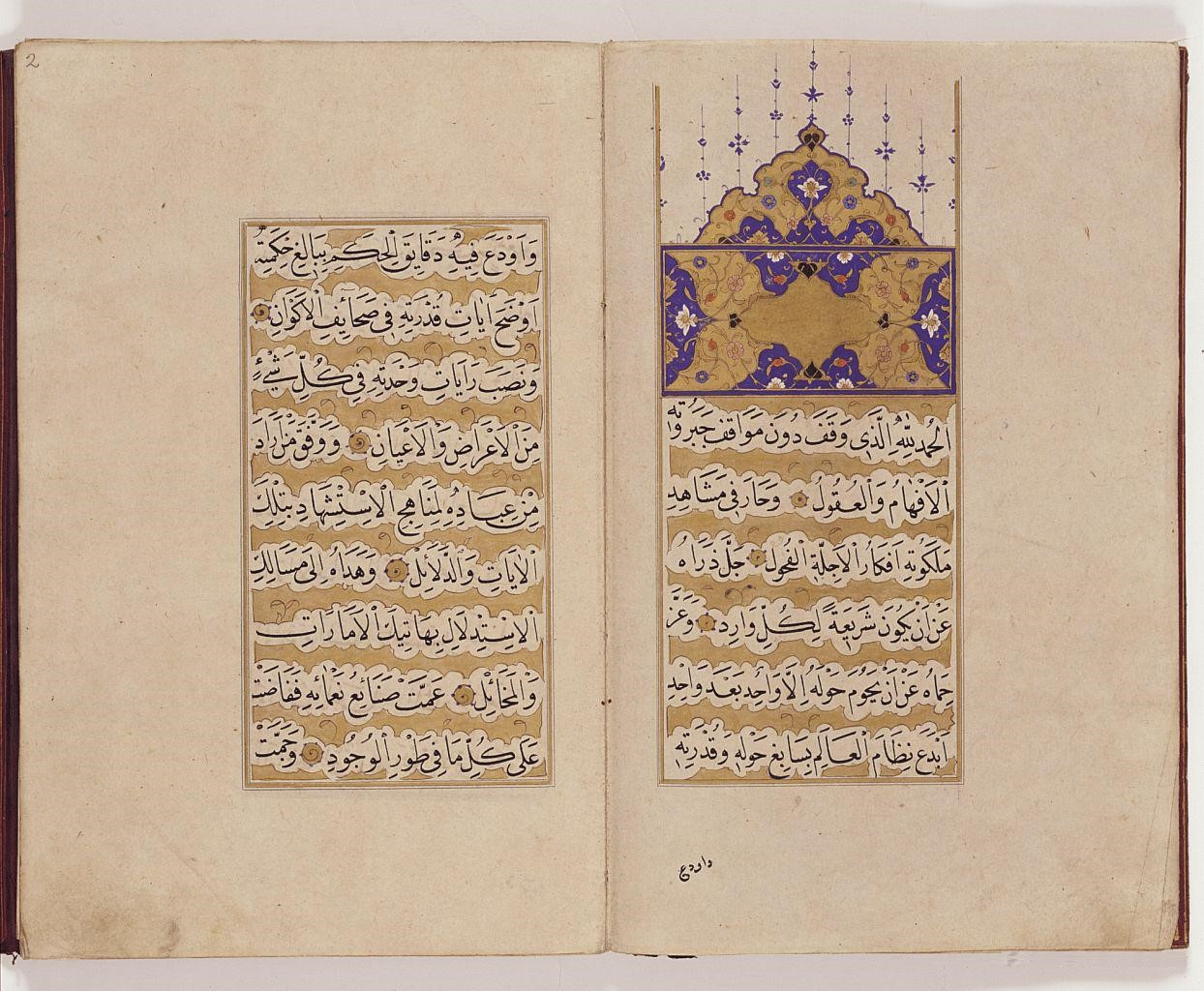
Endowment Charter (Waqfiyya) of the Hürrem Sultan Mosque, Madrasa and Imaret (soup-kitchen). AD 1556–1557 (AH 964). Museum of Turkish and Islamic Arts

The traditional place of higher education is the madrasa. The institution likely originated in Khurasan during the 10th century AD, and spread to other parts of the Islamic world from the late 11th century onwards. The most famous early madrasas are the Sunni Niẓāmiyyas, founded by the Seljuk vizir Nizam al-Mulk (1018–1092) in Iran and Iraq in the 11th century. The Mustansiriyya Madrasa, established by the Abbasid caliph al-Mustansir in Baghdad in 1234 AD, was the first to be founded by a caliph, and also the first known to host teachers of all four major madhhab known at that time. From the time of the Persian Ilkhanate (1260–1335 AD) and the Timurid dynasty (1370–1507 AD) onwards, madrasas have often become part of an architectural complex which also includes a mosque, a Sufi ṭarīqa, and other buildings of socio-cultural function, like baths or a hospital.

Madrasas are considered sacred places of learning. They may provide boarding and salaries to a limited number of teachers, and boarding for a number of students out of the revenue from religious endowments (waqf), allocated to a specific institution by the donor. In later times, the deeds of endowment were issued in elaborate Islamic calligraphy, as is the case for Ottoman endowment books (vakıf-name). The donor could also specify the subjects to be taught, the qualification of the teachers, or which madhhab the teaching should follow. Moreover, the donor is free to specify in detail the curriculum, as was shown by Ahmed and Filipovic (2004) for the Ottoman imperial madrasas founded by Suleiman the Magnificent.

As Berkey (1992) has described in detail for the education in medieval Cairo, unlike medieval Western universities, in general madrasas have no distinct curriculum, and do not issue diplomas. The educational activities of the madrasas focuses on the law, but also includes what Zaman (2010) called "Sharia sciences" (al-ʿulūm al-naqliyya) as well as the rational sciences like philosophy, astronomy, mathematics or medicine. The inclusion of these sciences sometimes reflects the personal interests of their donors, but also indicates that scholars often study various different sciences.

== Branches of learning ==
=== Sufism ===
Early on in Islamic history, a line of thought developed around the idea of mysticism, striving for the perfection (Ihsan) of worship. During the first Islamic century, Hasan al-Basri (642–728 AD) was one of the first Muslim scholars to describe, according to Albert Hourani (1991) "the sense of the distance and nearness of God ... in the language of love". During the 7th century, the ritual of Dhikr evolved as a "way of freeing the soul from the distractions of the world". Important early scholars who further elaborated on mysticism were Harith al-Muhasibi (781–857 AD) and Junayd al-Baghdadi (835–910 AD).

=== Philosophy and ethics ===
The early Muslim conquests brought about Arab Muslim rule over large parts of the Hellenistic world. During the time of the Umayyad Caliphate, at latest, the scholars of the emerging Islamic society had become familiar with the classical philosophical and scientific traditions of the world they had conquered. The collection of classical works and their translation into the Arabian language initiated a period which is known today as the Islamic Golden Age. According to Hourani (1991), the works of the classical scholars of antiquity were met with considerable intellectual curiosity by Islamic scholars. Hourani quotes al-Kindi (c. 801–873 AD), "the father of Islamic philosophy", as follows:

We should not be ashamed to acknowledge truth from whatever source it comes to us, even if it is brought to us by former generations and foreign peoples. For him who seeks the truth there is nothing of higher value than truth itself.

The works of Aristotle, in particular his Nicomachean Ethics, had a profound influence on the Islamic scholars of the Golden Age like Al-Farabi (870–950 AD), Abu al-Hassan al-Amiri (d. 992 AD) and Ibn Sina (ca. 980–1037 AD). In general, the Islamic philosophers saw no contradiction between philosophy and the religion of Islam. However, according to Hourani, al-Farabi also wrote that philosophy in its pure form was reserved for an intellectual elite, and that ordinary people should rely for guidance on the sharia. The distinction between a scholarly elite and the less educated masses "was to become a commonplace of Islamic thought". As exemplified by the works of al-Razi (c. 865–925 AD), during later times, philosophy "was carried on as a private activity, largely by medical men, pursued with discretion, and often met with suspicion".

The founder of Islamic philosophical ethics is Ibn Miskawayh (932–1030 AD) He combined Aristotelian and Islamic ethics, explicitly mentioning the Nicomachean Ethics and its interpretation by Porphyry of Gaza as the foundation of his philosophical thoughts.

In the 12th century, the early Islamic Neoplatonism which had developed out of Hellenistic philosophy was effectively criticised by al-Ghazali, one of the most influential scholars of Islam. In his works Tahāfut al-Falāsifa (The Incoherence of the Philosophers), Mizan al-'amal (Criterion of Action) and Kimiya-yi sa'ādat (The Alchemy of Happiness), he refuted the Philosophy of Ibn Sīnā, and demonstrated that the Aristotelian ethics is incompatible with Islamic ethics: The latter is based on the belief in God and in life after death, which together provide the foundation of action in the pursuit of sa'āda (Happiness).

=== Law ===
According to Shia Islam, the authority to interpret the messages of the Quran and the Hadith lies with the Imamah, a line of infallible interpreters of the truth. The Sunni majority, however, reject this concept and maintain that God's will has been completely revealed in the Quran and sunnah of the Prophet. The capacity of its interpretation lies with the ulama.

By the eleventh century, the major schools of Sunni and Shia law (madhhab) had emerged. Whilst, historically, the schools were at times engaged in mutual conflicts, the differences became less controversial over time, and merely represent regional predominances today. The four most important Sunni schools are:

- Shafi'i (Egypt, Mashriq, Hijaz, Yemen)
- Maliki (Maghreb and West Africa)
- Hanafi (Central and South Asia, the Balkans, Turkey)
- Hanbali (most common in Arab countries in the Persian Gulf region)

Shia madhhab include the Ja'fari and Zaidi schools. Minor madhhab also mentioned in the Amman message are the Ibadi and the Zahiri schools.

All Sunni madhhabs recognize four sources of sharia (divine law): the Quran, sunnah (authentic hadith), qiyas (analogical reasoning), and ijma (juridical consensus). However, the madhhabs differ from each other in their conception of the Principles of Islamic jurisprudence, or uṣūl al-fiqh, as briefly summarised by Hourani (1991). The Hanbalis accepted only the consensus of the Companions of the Prophet (aṣ-ṣaḥābah), which gave more leeway to independent reasoning (ijtihad) within the boundaries of the rules of qiyās. The Hanafis hold that strict analogy may at times be supported by a limited use of juristic preference (istihsan), whereas the Maliki school also allows pragmatic considerations in the interest of public welfare (istislah) are also acceptable. Instead of the Sunni concept of analogy (qiyās), Shia ulama prefer "dialectical reasoning" ('Aql) to deduce law.

The body of substantive jurisprudence (fiqh) defines the proper way of life through interpretation of sharia, which Muslims should follow if they want to live according to God's will. Over time, the madhhabs established "codes of conduct", examining human actions in the light of the Quran and Hadith. Supplementing the sharia were customs (ʿurf) within a given society. Islamic law and regional customs were not opposed to each other: In 15th century Morocco, qadis were allowed to use a process called ʻamal in order to choose from different juridical opinions one which applied best to the local customs, even if they were not supported by the consensus of the majority. More often, the use of sharia led to changes in local customs.

=== Theology ===
ʿIlm al-Kalām, the "science of discourse", also termed "Islamic theology", serves to explain and defend the doctrine of the Quran and Hadith. The concept of kalām was introduced during the first Islamic centuries by the Muʿtazila school. One of the most prominent scholars of the Muʿtazila was Abd al-Jabbar ibn Ahmad (935–1025 AD). From the 11th century on, the Muʿtazila was suppressed by the Sunni Abbasid Caliphate and the Seljuk Empire, but it continued playing an important role in the formation of Shia theology. The Ash'ari school encouraged the use of Kalām as the basis of fiqh, and was followed in this approach by parts of the Shafi'i madhhab. In contrast, the Hanbali and Maliki madhhabs discouraged theological speculation. Abu Mansur al-Maturidi (853–944 AD) developed his own form of Kalām, differing from the Ash'ari view in the question of Man's free will and God's omnipotence. Maturidi Kalām was often used in combination with Hanafi fiqh in the northwestern parts of the Islamic world.

A distinct school of theology often called traditionalist theology emerged under the leadership of Ahmad ibn Hanbal in the early centuries of Islam among hadith scholars who rejected rationalistic argumentation. In the wake of the Ash'arite synthesis between Mu'tazilite rationalism and Hanbalite literalism, its original form survived among a minority of mostly Hanbalite scholars. While Ash'arism and Maturidism are often called the Sunni "orthodoxy", traditionalist theology has thrived alongside it, laying rival claims to be the orthodox Sunni faith.

Islamic theology experienced further developments among Shia theologians.

== Cosmopolitan scholarly tradition ==
The study of, and commentaries on Quran and hadith, debates about ijtihad and taqlid and the issuing of fatwa as well as the use of Arabic, and later also Persian as common languages of discourse constituted the religious authority of the ulama throughout the entire Islamic world. Zaman has demonstrated that, as personal contacts were key to acquiring knowledge, Islamic scholars sometimes travel far in search of knowledge (ṭalab al-ʿilm). Due to their common training and language, any scholars travelling from one region of the Islamic world to another can easily integrate themselves into the local Muslim community and hold offices there: The traveller Ibn Battuta (1304–1368 or 1369), born in Tangiers, Morocco, to a family of ulema, was appointed qadi by Sultan Muhammad bin Tughluq of Delhi. Nuruddin ar-Raniri (d. 1658), born to a Gujarati Muslim family, travelled to, and worked as Shaykh ul-Islam in modern-day Indonesia under the protection of Iskandar Thani, Sultan of Aceh. Both scholars were able to move freely in an "interconnected world of fellow scholars". According to Zaman, their offices and positions as respected scholars were only questioned if they proved themselves unfamiliar with local customs (as happened to Ibn Battuta]), or met resistance from opponents with stronger local roots (ar-Raniri).

Through their travels and teachings, ulama are able to transmit new knowledge and ideas over considerable distances. However, according to Zaman (2010), scholars have often been required to rely on commonly known texts which could support their fatwas. A text which might be widely known within the intellectual circles of one region could be unknown in another. The ability of scholars from one region to support their argument in another might therefore be limited by the familiarity with the respective texts of the community they are working in. In an era without book print or mass communication media, a scholar's reputation might have remain limited if he was unfamiliar with the local canon of texts. As the ijazah, the scholar's approval by another master, is key to the scholar's reputation, the latter would be greater in regions where the approving masters is more widely known.

== Political and cultural history ==
The percentage of scholars from each major region of the Islamic world in 25 Hijri year intervals from 91–616 (709–1219 CE), based upon Shadharat Adh-Dhahab of Ibn al-Imad al-Hanbali (d. 1687). 'Other' includes Arabia, Spain, Maghreb and Anatolia. View source data.

=== Early Muslim communities ===
The second caliph, Umar ibn al-Khattab, funded a group of Muslims to study the revelations, stories of Muhammed's life, "and other pertinent data, so that when he needed expert advice" he could draw it from these "people of the bench". According to Tamim Ansary, this group evolved into the Ulama

=== Fiqh ===
The formative period of Islamic jurisprudence stretches back to the time of the early Muslim communities. In this period, jurists were more concerned with pragmatic issues of authority and teaching than with theory. Progress in theory began to develop with the coming of the early Muslim jurist Muhammad ibn Idris ash-Shafi'i (767–820), who codified the basic principles of Islamic jurisprudence in his book ar-Risālah. The book details the four roots of law (Qur'an, Sunnah, ijma, and qiyas) while specifying that the primary Islamic texts (the Qur'an and the hadith) must be understood according to objective rules of interpretation derived from scientific study of the Arabic language.

According to Feldman (2008), under many Muslim caliphate states and later states ruled by sultans, the ulama were regarded as the guardians of Islamic law and prevented the Caliph from dictating legal results, with the ruler and ulama forming a sort of "separation of powers" in government. Laws were decided based on the Ijma (consensus) of the Ummah (community), which was most often represented by the legal scholars.

=== Early modern Islamic empires ===
The Sunni Ottoman, and the Shi'a Safavid Persian dynasties, rulers of the two opponent early modern Islamic empires, both relied on ulama in order to legitimise their power. In both empires, ulama patronised by the royal courts created "official" religious doctrines which supported the dynastic rule. At the high points of their political power, respectively, the development took different paths: The Ottoman Sultan Süleyman I successfully integrated the imperial ulama into the imperial bureaucracy, and Ottoman secular law into Islamic law. In contrast, Shah Abbas I of Persia was unable to gain similar support by the Shi'a ulama, who retained a more independent position. During the late Safavid empire, the Shi'a ulama developed into one of the warrantors of continuity in a period of instability of the central government, thus securing a relative independency which they retained during the reign of subsequent dynasties.

==== Ottoman imperial Sunni ulama ====
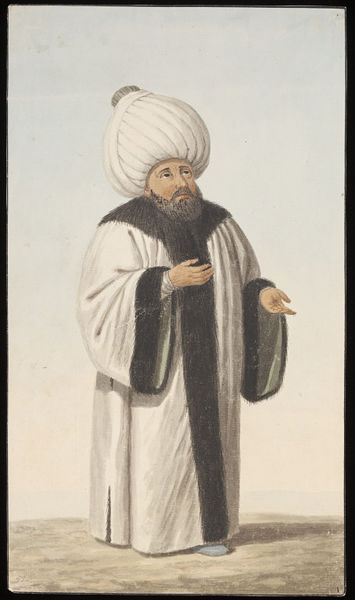
Seyh-ül-Islâm, watercolour, ca. 1809

After the Fall of Constantinople in 1453, the leaders and subjects of the Ottoman Empire became increasingly aware of its role as a great power of its time. This new self-awareness was associated with the idea to legitimise the new political role by linking the religious scholarship to the political system: Ottoman historians of the 15th and 16th century like Ibn Zunbul or Eyyûbî, described the deeds of the Ottoman sultans in terms of idealised Islamic ghazi warriors. According to Burak (2015), the Ottoman literature genres of the "rank order" (Turkish: tabaḳat and the "biografic lexicon" (Turkish: Eş-şakaiku'n) compiled the biographies of scholars in such ways as to create a concise and coherent tradition of the doctrine and structure of the Ottoman imperial scholarship. During the 16th century, scholars like the Shaykh al-Islām Kemālpaşazade (d. 1534), Aḥmād b. Muṣṭafā Taşköprüzāde (1494–1561), Kınalızāde ʿAli Çelebi (d. 1572) and Ali ben Bali (1527–1584) established a seamless chain of tradition from Abu Hanifa to their own time. Explicitly, some authors stated that their work must not only be understood as the historiography of the Hanafi madhhab, but that it should be consulted in case of eventual disagreements within the school of law. This exemplifies their purpose to establish a canon of Hanafi law within the Ottoman imperial scholarship. which modern Ottomanists termed the "Ottoman Islam".

After 1453, Mehmed the Conqueror (1432–1481) had established eight madrasas in former Byzantine church buildings, and later founded the sahn-ı şeman or "Eight courtyards madrasa", adjacent to the Fatih mosque, where he brought together the most distinguished Islamic law scholars of his territory. In his 2015 study on the "second formation of Islamic law", Burak has shown in detail how the Ottoman state gradually imposed upon the traditional ulama a hierarchy of "official imperial scholars", appointed and paid by the central government. From the conquest of the Mamluk Sultanate of Cairo in 1517 onwards, the Ottoman ulama set up their own interpretation of the Sunni Hanafi doctrine which then served as the official religious doctrine of the empire. The formal acknowledgment by decree of the sultan became a prerequisite to issue fatwas. In the 17th century, the annalist al-Hamawi used the expression "sultanic mufti" (al-ifta' al-sultani) to delineate the difference between the officially appointed religious leaders and those who had followed the traditional way of education. Other authors at that time called the Ottoman law scholars "Hanafi of Rūm [i.e., the Ottoman Empire]" (Rūmi ḫānāfi), "Scholars of Rūm" (ʿulamā'-ı rūm) or "Scholars of the Ottoman Empire" (ʿulamā' al-dawla al-ʿUthmaniyyā). The Shaykh al-Islām (Turkish: Şeyhülislam) in Istanbul became the highest-ranking Islamic scholar within, and head of the ulama throughout the empire.

The ulama in the Ottoman Empire had a significant influence over politics due to the belief that secular institutions were all subordinate to Islamic law, the Sharia (Turkish: Şeriat). The ulama were responsible for interpreting the religious law, therefore they claimed that their power superseded that of the government. Within the Ottoman hierarchy of ulama, the Shaykh al-Islām held the highest rank. He exerted his influence by issuing fatwas, his written interpretations of the sharia had authority over the entire Ottoman population. In the 16th century, as the support by the ulama of the sultan and the central government was essential for shaping the still-growing empire, the importance of the office rose, and its power increased. As members of the Ilmiye, the imperial scholars were part of the Ottoman elite class of the Askeri, and were exempt from any taxes.

However, by approving scholars and appointing them to offices, over time the sultan's influence increased over the religious scholars, although, as a Muslim, he still stood under the Islamic law. Even the Shaykh al-Islām was subordinate to the sultan; his position, like the ranks of the muftis, was described as a "service" (Turkish: hizmet) or "rank" (Turkish: rütbe or paye-ı Sahn), to which a candidate was appointed or elevated. Sometimes, the sultans made use of their power: In 1633, Murad IV gave order to execute the Shaykh al-Islām Ahīzāde Ḥüseyin Efendi. In 1656, Shaykh al-Islām Ḥocazāde Mesʿud Efendi was sentenced to death by sultan Mehmed IV.

The use of the Sunni Islam as a legitimisation of the Ottoman dynastic rule is closely linked to Sultan Süleyman I and his kazasker and later Schaykh al-Islām Ebussuud Efendi. Ebussuud compiled an imperial book of law (ḳānūn-nāme), which combined religious law (sharīʿah) with secular dynastic law (ḳānūn) in the person of the sultan. For example, Ebussuud provided a reason why the government could own land, or could levy and increase taxes, as the government was responsible for the protection of the common good of all Muslims.

==== Shi'a state religion of Safavid Persia ====
Shaikh Safi-ad-Din Ardabili (1252–1334) was the founder of the Safaviyya tariqa. Safi ad-Din's great-great-grandson Ismail, who from 1501 onwards ruled over the Persian Empire, was the founder of the Safavid dynasty. Shah Ismail I proclaimed the Twelver Shi'a as the new Persian state religion. To propagate the Safavid faith, he invited ulama from Qom, Jabal 'Āmil in southern Lebanon and Syria to travel around Iran and promote the Shi'a doctrine. In 1533, Shah Tahmasp I commissioned a new edition of the Safvat as-safa, Shaikh Ṣāfī's genealogy. It was rewritten in order to support the royal family's claim at descendency from Musa al-Kadhim, the Seventh Imam, and thus to legitimise the Safavid rule.

During the reign of Shah Abbas I (1571 – 1629 AD), the argument of the theocratic unity of religious and political power was no longer sufficient to legitimise the Shah's authority: Shi'a ulama renounced the monarch's claim to represent the hidden Imam by teaching that descendancy did not necessarily mean representation. Likewise, as the influence of Sufi mysticism weakened, the Shah's role as the head of the Safaviyya lost its significance as a justification for his political role. Abbas I thus sought to associate himself with eminent ulama like Shaykh Bahāʾi (1574–1621 AD), whom he made Shaykh al-Islām in his new capital, Isfahan. Other famous ulama working under Abbas's patronage were Mir Damad (d. 1631 or 1632 AD), one of the founders of the School of Isfahan, and Ahmad ibn Muhammad Ardabili (d. 1585). By their teachings, they further developed the Shi'a Islamic teachings and religious practice. However, as religion did no longer suffice to support political power in Persia, Abbas I had to develop independent concepts to legitimise his rule. He did so by creating a new ghulam army, thus evoking the Turco-Mongol tradition of Timur and his reign.

=== 19th century ===
==== New Ottoman scholarly elite ====
By the beginning of the 19th century, the Ottoman ulama still retained their political influence. When sultan Selim III tried to reform the Ottoman army, the ulama opposed his plans, which they rejected as an apostasy from Islam. Consequently, his reform failed. However, Selims successor Mahmud II (r. 1808–1839) was more successful: He called the new troops, organised according to European models, by the name "Victorious army of Muhammad" (Asâkir-i Mansure-i Muhammediye). By doing so, he was able to overcome the accusation of apostasy and secure the ulama's support. Mahmuds reforms created a new imperial elite class who spoke Western European languages and were knowledgeable of the Western European societies and their political systems. As the political and economic pressure increased on the Ottoman Empire in the course of the 19th century, this new elite carried on the Sultan's reforms and helped initiating a new era of reform, the Tanzimat. In parallel, the political influence of the ulama was circumvented and reduced step by step. A ministry for religious endowments was created in order to control the finances of the vakıf. Thus, the ulama lost direct control over their finances, which significantly reduced their capacity to exert political influence.

==== Orthodox Shi'a ulama in post-Safavid and Qajar Iran ====
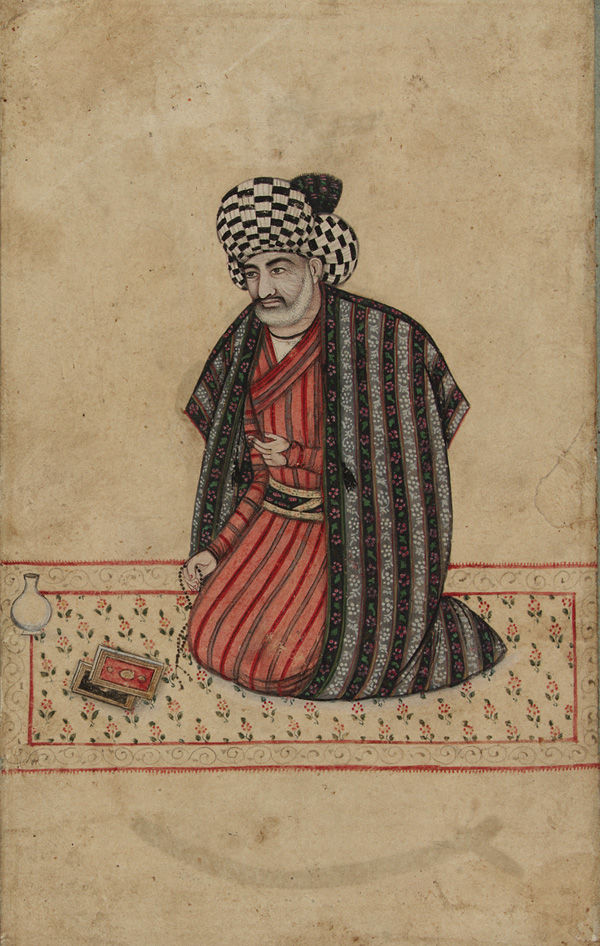
Iranian Shaykh ul-Islam Mohammad-Baqer Majlesi (1627–1699)

In Iran, a period of political instability began with the collapse of the Safavid reign after shah Sultan Husayns death in 1722. In the light of the discontinuity and fragmentation of the central government, two social groups maintained continuity and, consequently, rose in power: Tribal chieftains established, amongst others, the Khanates of the Caucasus, the Afsharid and Zand dynasties. The second group who benefitted from the weakness of the central authority was the Shi'a ulama. According to Garthwaite (2010), "the ulama constituted one institution that not only provided continuity, but gradually asserted its role over and against royal authority." A process of change began which continued throughout the 19th century and into the present.

Already some of the last Safavids, Sulayman Shah (r. 1666–1694) and Tahmasp II (r. 1722–1732) had sought the ulama's support in an attempt to strengthen their authority. Particularly, they associated themselves with a group of ulama who supported the "official" Twelver Shi'a doctrine, established by the Iranian Shaykh al-Islām Mohammad-Baqer Majlesi (1627–1699) during the later decades of Safavid rule. The dispute between the Twelver Shi'a and Mir Damad's (d. 1631 or 1632) and Mulla Sadra's (c. 1571/2 – 1640) School of Isfahan, who promoted Sufi mysticism and Islamic philosophy, continued throughout the 18th century, and shaped the relationship between ulama and government during the reigns of the subsequent dynasties.

With the accession of Agha Mohammad Khan Qajar to the Iranian throne, the Qajar dynasty consolidated the central power. However, the Qajar Shahs, in particular Naser al-Din Shah Qajar (r. 1848–1896), whose reign paralleled that of the Ottoman Sultans of the Tanzimat time, failed at obtaining central control over the ulama. The Shiite scholars retained their political influence on the Persian society. They also maintained unrestricted access to the financial resources from the religious endowments. In addition, the Islamic Zakat tax was paid to individual imams and not to state-sponsored tax collectors. Both their religious influence and their financial means allowed the Shiite ulama to act, at times, against the Shah. Thus, under the Qajar dynasty, the ulama provided a source of religious legitimacy and served as interpreters of religious law in a dual legal system where the state administered law based on custom (ʻurf).

=== 19th/20th century: Ulama and Muslim reform ===
==== Reformers and concepts ====
Starting in the first half of the 19th century, direct contacts began and gradually increased between members of the ulama and modern Western Europe. The Egyptian alim Rifa'a al-Tahtawi (1801–1873) was amongst the first members of the ulama who travelled to Europe. As a religious counsellor to a delegation by the Egyptian khedive Muhammad Ali Pasha he stayed in Paris from 1826 to 1831. His report "The Extraction of Gold or an Overview of Paris" (Taḫlīṣ al-ibrīz fī talḫīṣ Bārīz) (1849) included some outlines of future reforms and potential improvements in his native country. Although al-Tahtawi had gone through the traditional education of an alim, his interest focused on modern French concepts of administration and economy. He only referred to Islam in order to emphasize that Muslims can adopt practical knowledge and insights from Europe. As such, lt-Tahtawi's report reflects the political efforts of Muhammad Ali Pasha, who did not intend to reform al-Azhar university, but aimed at building an independent educational system sponsored by his government.

Hayreddin Pasha (1822/3–1890) was an Ottoman Tunisian alim and statesman who reformed the administration and jurisdiction of the province. He was able to explain his ideas in French (Réformes nécessaires aux États musulmans – Necessary reforms of the Muslim states. Paris, 1868), which he had learned whilst representing his sovereign Ahmad Bey at the court of Napoleon III from 1852 to 1855. In contrast to al-Tahtawi, Hayreddin Pasha used the religious concept of the Muslim collective interest (maṣlaḥa) to make his point, thereby applying the idea of ijtihad to public affairs.

Positions comparable to the Western Islamic ulama were also taken in the Eastern parts of the Islamic world by Syed Ahmad Khan, the pioneering Muslim modernist in South Asia, and Jamal al-Din al-Afghani. The latter is regarded as the mentor of Pan-Islamism, but also as one of the founders of the political Islam and of the late 19th and 20th century Salafi movement.

The Egyptian Grand Mufti Muhammad Abduh (1849–1905), who was granted the degree of 'Alim by al-Azhar university in 1877, was the first who used the term Islāh in order to denote political and religious reforms. Until 1887 he edited together with al-Afghani the newspaper al-ʿUrwa al-Wuthqā ("The firm bond"). The gazette widely spread the pan-islamistic concept of Islam representing a religious bond which was believed to be stronger than nationality or language. From 1876 on, Abduh edited the newspaper al-Ahrām. Since 1898, he also edited, together with Rashid Rida (1865–1935), the newspaper al-Manār ("The Beacon"), (Note: not to be confused with the television station Al-Manar) in which he further developed his ideas. al-Manār appeared in print for almost 40 years and was read throughout the Islamic world.

ʿAbduh understood Islah as a concept of "reform of mankind" (iṣlāḥ nauʿ al-insān). In his works, he emphasized the special importance of a reform of the traditional madrasa system, which was taken to disadvantage by the parallel establishment of the secular, state-sponsored educational system in Egypt. He strove at reconciling the traditional and modern educational systems, thereby justifying from the point of view of Islam the introduction of modern institutions by the national state. He referred to the Islamic concept of the collective interest or common good of the Muslim community (maṣlaḥa), to which he accorded overarching importance (al-maṣlaḥa shar) in the interest of his fellow Muslims. The concept of islāh gained special relevance for the future, as it strives at understanding and justifying all aspects of modern life from the Islamic doctrine.

After Abduh's death in 1905, Rashīd Ridā continued editing al-Manār on his own. In 1924, he published a collection of writings by some ulama of Najd: Maǧmūʿat al-ḥadiṭ an-naǧdīya. Thus, the teachings of the Yemeni alim Muhammad ash-Shawkani (1759–1839), which had already been discussed since the 1880s, gained greater publicity. Likewise, the writings of the Hanbali scholar Ibn Taymiyyah (1263–1328) came to attention again. Ibn Taymiyyah's doctrine provided a link between the wahhabiyya and parts of the salafiyya movements. The theological differences between the two movements were altogether too large for a complete union of the two doctrines. However, the opening of the Salafi movement towards Wahhabism helped to reconcile the latter with the Islamic public after king Ibn Saud's invasion of the Hijaz in 1924. The Central Arabian militias (Iḫwān) had occupied and looted the holy towns of Mecca and Medina, thereby destroying monuments which they considered pagan (shirk). Starting with the Pan-Islamic Congress in Mecca in 1926, the pro-Saudi movement developed into one of the most relevant currents of Islamic thought.

In his Egyptian exile, the Syrian alim Abd ar-Rahman al-Kawakibi (1854–1902) met al-Afghani, Abduh and Rida. In his books Ṭabāʾiʿ al-istibdād ("The nature of despotism") and Umm al-Qurā ("Mother of villages [i.e., Mecca]", 1899) he accused the Ottoman sultan Abdülhamid II of corrupting the Islamic community. The Ottoman despotism "encroaches on the rights of its citizens, keeps them ignorant to keep them passive, [and] denies their right to take an active part in human life". Therefore, the law must be reformed. By the use of ijtihad, a "modern and unified system of law" must be created, and "proper religious education" must be provided. Because of the central position of the Arabic peoples in the ummah and the Arabic language in the intellectual discourse, but also because "Arabian Islam is ... free from modern corruptions and the bedouin are free from the moral decay and passivity of despotism", the balance of power must shift from the Turks towards the Arabs. The Ottoman dynasty must give up their claim to the caliphate, and a new caliph of Quraysh descent must be elected by representatives of the ummah. His temporal authority would be set up in the Hejaz, whilst he would hold religious authority over the entire Muslim community, "assisted ... by a consultative council nominated by the Muslim rulers".

Al-Kawākibīs idea that the Arabian doctrine represented a more puristic form of the Islam, according to Cleveland and Bunton (2016), prepared the ground for the 20th century Arab nationalism as well as the Islamic renewal movement of the Nahda.

==== Muslim mass organizations ====
In 1912, the Muhammadiyah organization was founded in Yogyakarta (in modern-day Indonesia), which, together with Nahdlatul Ulama ("Reawakening of the ulama"), founded in 1926, form the two largest Muslim organizations in the world. Since the 1930s, their religious boarding schools (pesantren) also taught mathematics, natural sciences, English and history. Since the 1980, the Nahdlatul Ulama schools also offered degrees in economy, jurisdiction, paedagogical and medical sciences. In the 1990s, under their leader Abdurrahman Wahid, the organization adopted an anti-fundamentalistic doctrine, teaching democracy and pluralism.

Darul Uloom Deoband, next to al-Azhar one of the most influential madrasas, was founded in the city of Deoband, Uttar Pradesh, in 1867. Initially, the intention of the school was to help Indian Muslims, who had become subjects of the British Empire after 1857, to lead their lives according to Islamic law. The Deobandi propagate a Sunni Islam of the Hanafi school, which was the most prevalent madhhab in South Asia. Still today, they aim at a revival of the Islamic society and education. Following the example of Deoband, thousands of madrasas were founded during the late 19th century which adopted the Deobandi way of studying fundamental texts of Islam and commenting on Quran and Hadith. By referring back to traditional Islamic scholars, the Deobandi School aims at defending the traditional Islamic madhhab, especially the Hanafi, against criticism which arose from other Islamic schools like the Ahl-i Hadith. During the 1990s, the Afghan taliban also referred to the Deoband School. Ashraf Ali Thanwi (1863–1943) is one of the most prominent teachers of Darul Uloom Deoband. Thanwi initiated and edited multi-volume encyclopedic commentaries on the Quran. However, he was also able to reach out to a larger audience: His book Bahishti Zewar, which is still widely read in South Asia, as it details, amongst other topics, the proper conduct and beliefs for Muslim women.

Ahl-i Hadith is a movement which emerged in North India in the mid-19th century. By rejecting taqlid (following legal precedent) and favouring ijtihad (independent legal reasoning) based on the foundational scriptures of Islam, they oppose the traditional madhhab and criticize their reliance on legal authorities other than the traditional texts. The Ahl-i Hadith was the first organization which printed and spread the works of Muhammad ash-Shawkani, whose writings did also influence the doctrine of the Salafi movement in the Arab Middle East and worldwide.

Muslim World League is an international non-governmental Islamic organization based in Mecca, Saudi Arabia that is a member of UNICEF, UNESCO and OIC. It aims to resolve the issues faced by the Islamic community by organizing scholarly conferences with the ulama around the world in order to form public Islamic opinions based on principles of moderation, peace and harmony.

=== Ulama in the secular national states of the 20th century ===
In most countries, the classical institution of the madrasa as a place of teaching remained largely intact until the beginning of the 20th century. In the Western parts of the Islamic world, national states arose from the disintegration and partition of the Ottoman Empire after the First World War. The government of Kemalist Turkey sought to distance the nation from the religious traditions and institutions of the Ottoman past.

In Egypt, the establishment of a state-controlled educational system had already begun in the 1820s. From 1961 onwards, Gamal Abdel Nasser tried to increase the state control over ancient Islamic institutions like al-Azhar university. The head of al-Azhar was—and still is—appointed directly by the president, and new faculties were created in this ancient Islamic institution.

Initially giving rise to modernist reforms, up to a certain degree the state-sponsored faculties were able to retain their independence from government control. However, as Pierret has pointed out in detail for Syria, in some countries the orthodox madrasa system remained largely intact, its decentralised organisation protecting it from state control. In fact, the government's attempt at controlling the religious education focussed largely on the academic institutions and neglected the traditional madrasas. By their continuing ability to provide social support and access to an educational alternative which was propagated as being more orthodox according to Islamic faith, the traditional ulama not only maintained their influence on large parts of the population, but actually increased their political influence and power.

==== Republic of Turkey ====
In the Kemalist Republic of Turkey, traditional Ottoman religious institutions were abolished like the Ottoman Caliphate, the office of the Shaykh ul-Islam, as well as the dervish brotherhoods. The Presidency of Religious Affairs (Turkish: Diyanet İşleri Başkanlığı, or Diyanet) was created in 1924 by article 136 of the Constitution of Turkey by the Grand National Assembly of Turkey as a successor to the office of the Shaykh ul-Islam. From 1925 onwards, the traditional dervish tekkes and Islamic schools were dissolved. Famous convents like the Tekke of the Mevlevi order in Konya were secularized and turned into museums.

==== Iran ====
In Iran, contrary to many other Islamic countries, the Shi'a ulama have maintained their religious authority together by Khums tax. Thus, they maintained their ability to exert political pressure.

Between 1905 and 1911, a coalition of ulama, bazaari, and some radical reformers incited the Persian Constitutional Revolution, which led to the establishment of the parliament (majlis) of Iran during the Qajar dynasty.

The Islamic Revolution in Iran was led by a senior Shia cleric—the Ayatollah Ruhollah Khomeini—who then established the Guardianship of the Islamic Jurist.

==== Syria ====
In his study Religion and State in Syria (2013), Pierret pointed out how the training of Syria's ulama gradually became more institutionalised, based upon the traditional madrasa system. In 1920, the madrasa of the Khusrawiyya Mosque complex (which was to be destroyed in 2014 during the Syrian Civil War) introduced an entrance exam and a stable curriculum for its Islamic seminary. Graduates were issued a diploma carrying the name of the institution, which bore the signatures of all teachers, signifying individual ijazah. In 1947, courses also included natural sciences and foreign languages. In 1947, the state-run "Faculty of Sharia" was initiated in Damascus by Kamal al-Qassab (1853–1954), a former student of Muhammad Abduh (1849–1905) in Cairo. Until 1954, all Syrian ulama aiming at higher degrees had to join Al-Azhar University in Cairo. In 1954, however, Syria's first higher faculty of sharia was founded by members of the modernist wing of the Muslim Brotherhood. Its curriculum, which included economy and the "current situation of the Muslim world", according to Pierret, "anticipated the 1961 modernist reform of al-Azhar by Nasser". In 1972, the curriculum of the state-run "Sharia high schools" was reformed again, thus providing access for their students to all faculties of Syrian high schools.

According to Pierret (2015), the Ba'ath Party coup of 1963 brought about a weakening of the state-controlled sharia high schools by the secular government. Many teachers of the Damascus faculty of sharia were forced into exile during the 1960s. Attempts of the regime during the 1980s at changing the curricula of the faculty and create a new "Ba'athist ulama" failed. The faculty, maintaining their ability to recruit competent teachers, was able to resist the political pressure. Consequently, the Syrian government prohibited the faculty to grant doctorates until 1998, and delayed the establishment of another faculty in Aleppo until 2006.

==== Tunisia, Egypt, Iraq ====
In 1961, Gamal Abdel Nasser put the Al-Azhar University under the direct control of the state. "Azharis were given military uniforms and found themselves marching in step under the orders of army officers." After the independence of Algeria, President Ahmed Ben Bella also deprived the Algerian ulama of their power. Baathist repression in Iraq led to a drop of enrollment in the Shia holy cities of Iraq from 12,000 students in the early 1900s to only 600 scholars and students in 1977.

==== Pakistan ====
In the 1980s and 1990s, competition arose between Sunni and Shia interests in Pakistan, with Saudi Arabian humanitarian organizations using the sponsorship of madrasas to spread their Wahhabi doctrine, while the Islamic Republic of Iran used Shiite madrasas to similarly peddle influence. For poorer communities in Pakistan, internationally sponsored madrasas could be the only accessible form of education.

This influence from institutions which were financially independent from the state led to a resurgence of the social and political influence of the traditional ulama, while the insufficient state control over the educational institutions, insufficient qualification of the teachers and ideologic indoctrination of such institutions all become considerable issues. Graduates (talib) from North Pakistani madrasas like "Mullah" Mohammed Omar subsequently played a role in the establishment of the Afghan Taliban regime.

== Modern challenges ==
Some opinions from within the Muslim world have criticized the lack of scientific training of the ulama, and argued that those proficient in the sciences should qualify for this title. In Egypt, Al-Azhar University has begun to introduce scientific and practical subjects in its traditional theological colleges to help the ulama face the challenges of the modern world. Sudanese politician Hassan Al-Turabi argued, in his work The Islamic State, that the ulama should not be limited to those versed in religious affairs but include experts in fields such as engineering, science, politics, and education, because all knowledge is divine and God-given.

== Types of titles ==
- Hafiz, recites Quran by heart
- Qāriʾ, who reads Quran with correct pronunciation
- Mawlawi, who has done 12 years of Islamic studies and preaches Salah
- Mir, who has all above titles, equivalent to doctorate degree
- Mir ul Urah, who is above Mir
- Mufti, issues fatwas
- Grand Mufti, highest Mufti

== See also ==
- Akhoond
- Seghatoleslam
- Allamah
- Anjuman-i-Ulama-i-Bangala, reformist Bengali association of Ulamas
- List of Islamic studies scholars
- List of modern-day Muslim scholars of Islam
- Nahdlatul Ulama
- Shi'a clergy
