= Peri Bearman =

American Islamic scholar (born 1953)

Peri J. Bearman (born 1953) is an academic scholar of Islamic law. She was the associate director of the Islamic Legal Studies Program at Harvard Law School. She is also currently the editor-in-chief and Islam section editor for the Journal of the American Society for Premodern Asia (JASPA).

== Life ==
Peri Bearman took degrees in Arabic and Islamic studies from the University of Leiden. She was the Islamic Studies acquisitions editor at Brill Publishers from 1990–1997 during which time she founded the journal Islamic Law and Society, the reference works Encyclopaedia of the Qurʾān and Encyclopedia of Women and Islamic Cultures, the series Studies in Islamic Law and Society, and numerous other projects that came into being after her departure for Harvard. She was a member of the editorial board of the second edition of the Encyclopaedia of Islam.

== Selected publications ==
- (ed. with Rudolph Peters and Frank E. Vogel) The Islamic School of Law: Evolution, Devolution, and Progress, Cambridge, Massachusetts: Islamic Legal Studies Program, Harvard Law School : Distributed by Harvard University Press, 2005. Harvard series in Islamic law, 2.
- (ed. with Wolfhart Heinrichs and Bernard G. Weiss) The Law Applied: Contextualizing the Islamic Shari'a. A Volume in Honor of Frank E. Vogel, London: I.B. Tauris, 2008.
- Peri Bearman, "Islamic Law: In the MENA Region," in Oxford Encyclopedia of the Modern World (editor-in-chief: Peter N. Stearns), 4 vols., New York: Oxford University Press, 2008.
- (ed. with Rudolph Peters) The Ashgate Research Companion to Islamic Law, Farnham, Surrey, UK: Ashgate, 2014.
- Peri Bearman, A History of the Encyclopaedia of Islam, Atlanta: Lockwood Press, 2018.
- Peri Bearman, A Guide to a Life of Moral Integrity: An Annotated Translation of Bustān al-ʿārifīn by Abū al-Layth al-Samarqandī, Piscataway, NJ: Gorgias Press, 2025.
