= Ma'ruf =

Islamic concept

Ma'ruf (Arabic: معروف) is an Islamic term that appears in the Quran in connection with ethical prescriptions. It appears 38 times, most often in the Qur'anic exhortation: امر بالمعروف و نهى عن المنكر "Amr bil Ma'ruf wa Nahy an al Munkar", translated as "Enjoin the good and forbid the wrong". Maʿrūf is seen as a key word in moral understanding of the Quran. According to traditional commentators, maʿrūf should not be confused with its cognate urf, "custom."

Although most common translations of the phrase is "good", the words used by Islamic philosophy in determining good and evil discourses are ḥusn and qubh. In its most common usage, maʿrūf is "in accordance with the custom", while munkar, which has no place in the custom, as its opposite, singular (nukr). In today's religious expression, maʿrūf is sunnah (this concept was not different from custom in the beginning), munkar is meant as bid'a. (a related topic: Istihsan)

However, today, according to the meanings attributed to the term with meaning expansions that are not based on etymological connection, the word can be used as "well-known, universally accepted, ... that which is good, beneficial ...; fairness, equity, equitableness;".

Pre-modern Islamic literature describes pious Muslims (usually scholars) taking action to forbid wrong by destroying forbidden objects, particularly liquor and musical instruments. In the contemporary Muslim world, various state or parastatal bodies (often with phrases like the "Promotion of Virtue and the Prevention of Vice" in their titles) have appeared in Iran, Saudi Arabia, Nigeria, Sudan, Malaysia, etc., at various times and with various levels of power.

== See also ==
- Maharoof (Sri Lankan surname)
- Enjoining good and forbidding wrong
- Hisbah
- Ijma
