= Istihsan =

Islamic legal term for juristic discretion

Istiḥsān (Arabic: اِسْتِحْسَان [is.tiːħ.saːn]) is an Arabic term for juristic discretion. In its literal sense it means "to consider something good". Muslim scholars may use it to express their preference for particular judgements in Islamic law over other possibilities. It is one of the principles of legal thought underlying scholarly interpretation or ijtihad.

A number of disputes existed amongst the classical jurists over this principle with the Hanafi school of jurisprudence and its jurists (fuqahah) adopting this as a secondary source. It is not the same thing as istislah, which plays a prominent part in other schools, including Maliki school, or istihlal, which is a derisive term for deeming something forbidden as permissible.

== Etymology ==
Istiḥsan (استحسان [istiħsaːn]) is an Arabic word derived from the word al-husn (الحسن) which means good which is the opposite meaning of al-qubh (القبح) which means bad. The word istiḥsan is used to express "decorating or improving or considering something good". It also applies to mean something towards which one is inclined or which one prefers, even if it is not approved by others. Technically it has been defined in several ways by Fuqaha (Islamic jurists):

- Bazdawi defines it as moving away from the implications of an analogy to an analogy that is stronger than it.
- Al-Halwani defines it as giving up an analogy for a stronger evidence from the Quran, Sunnah or ijma.
- The Maliki jurist, Abu Bakr Ibn al-Arabi defines it as sacrificing some of the implications of an evidence by way of exception.
- Al-Karkhi defines Istihsan as follows: "Istihsan is when one takes a decision on a certain case different from that on which similar cases have been decided on the basis of its precedents, for a reason which is stronger than one found in similar cases and which requires departure from those cases."

== Types of Istihsan ==
A number of categorisations have been employed by the jurists:

- Istihsan through the text (Nass)
- Istihsan on the basis of consensus (Ijma)
- Istihsan on the basis of tradition urf (Ma'ruf)
- Istihsan on the basis of necessity (Darurah)
- Istihsan on the basis of benefit (Maslahah)
- Istihsan on the basis of analogy (Qiyas)

== Examples of Istihsan ==
The following comprise classical examples for this principle:

- Abu Hanifah stated that the one who eats out of forgetfulness whilst fasting should repeat the fast - however he moves away from this by the evidence of a narration that allows the fast to stand.
- Analogy requires that the manufacturing contract with advance payment be prohibited on the basis of analogy - however this is made permissible according to ijma.
- Analogy requires that pure water be used for ablution so wells in which dirt or carcasses of animals have fallen would be prohibited for use according to strict analogy. Necessity exceptionalises this and permits the use of this water provided formal cleaning methods are applied first.

== Criticisms ==
Al-Shafi'i viewed the practice of juristic preference as a heretical usurping God's sole right as the legislator of Islamic law. It has been alleged that this criticism revolves more around the linguistic meaning of the term rather than its technical meaning, though modern scholarship regards Shafi'is comments as a direct criticism of the technical meaning. Malik ibn Anas is noted to have been asked about binding divorce. When he delivered his response, a disciple of his quickly reached for a tablet to make note of this ruling. Upon realizing what his disciple was doing, Malik asked him to stop, remarking that his opinion could change before nightfall.

Sarakhsi points out that some jurists have criticised Istihsan on the grounds that the analogy is being given up for personal opinion, something prohibited in Islam. He refutes this understanding as incomprehensible, as no jurist would give up an authority for something that lacked evidence.
