= Ibrahim al-Nazzam =

Arab poet and Scholar of Abbasid era

Abū Isḥāq Ibrāhīm ibn Sayyār al-Naẓẓām
- إبراهيم النظَّام

Personal life
- Born: AH 154-168 (CE 775-782) Basra, Iraq, Abbasid Caliphate
- Died: AH 221-230 (CE 836-845)
- Era: Islamic Golden Age (early Abbasid)

Religious life
- Religion: Islam
- Denomination: Mu'tazilism

Abū Isḥāq Ibrāhīm ibn Sayyār ibn Hāniʾ al-Naẓẓām (Arabic: أبو إسحاق إبراهيم بن سيار بن هانئ النظام; c. 775–c. 845; also dated d. c. 840, AH 225) was an Arab Muʿtazilite theologian and accomplished poet, regarded as one of the leading representatives of Muʿtazilite theology. He was a nephew of the Muʿtazilite theologian Abū al-Hudhayl al-ʿAllāf, and al-Jāḥiẓ was among his students. Al-Naẓẓām also served at the court of the Abbasid caliph al-Maʾmūn.

In some respects, al-Naẓẓām's theological position was closer than that of other Muʿtazilites to the later position associated with al-Ashʿarī. He emphasized the Qur'an as the sole source of theology and ethics and accepted limitations on human freedom within the bounds established by God, a position related to the problem later discussed in connection with the doctrine of kasb. Despite this, his dogmatic manner provoked strong opposition, including from other Muʿtazilites. Al-Naẓẓām's theological writings and doctrines survive only fragmentarily, most of his works having been lost.

== Views ==
=== Beliefs ===
Diverging from many of the diverse held views of his time, he was famous for his strong rejection of qiyas, which was accepted by both the Hanafites and some Shafi’ites; of juristic preference, a pillar of Hanafite thought; of the doctrine of binding consensus, accepted by all of Sunni Islam; and of the records believed by many Muslims to accurately describe prophetic traditions as narrated by Abu Hurayra.

=== Literal Interpretation of the Quran ===
Al-Nazzam was noted to have rejected Qiyas entirely. He also believed that the Quran ought to be interpreted literally without any other sources or methods backing up its interpretation. Some aspects of his beliefs would soon be taken by Dawud Al-Zahiri and the Zahiri school of thought. Shi'a scholars also were known to have quoted him.

=== Critique of the Shi'a ===
Although Shi'a scholars positively referenced him, Al-Nazzam himself rejected the view of Shi’a doctrine of the Imamate. Ibn Hazm mentions in his book Heterodoxies of the Shiites that Al-Nazzam said the following:

(al-Jahiz) narrates the following: Abu Ishak Ibrahim An-Nazzam and Bishr b. Khalid told me that they once said to Muhammed b. Ja‘far the Rafidite, known as Sheitan at-Tak: “Woe unto thee! Art thou not ashamed before Allah of what thou hast asserted in thy book on “the Imamate” that Allah never said in the Quran: 'The second of two: when they were both in the cave, when he said unto his companion: Be not grieved, for Allah is with us?'.” They both continue to narrate: “By Allah, Sheitan at-Tak thereupon broke forth into a long laughter so that (we felt) as had we been the evildoers.” An-Nazzam narrates: “We often spoke with ‘All b. Mitam as-Sabuni (the soapboiler)—he was one of the doctors of the Rawafid and one of their dogmatists—and we would occasionally ask him [for some information, which he would give us. When we asked him]: Is it (i.e., your information) an opinion (of your own) or an oral information (coming) from the Imams?” he would deny that he gave it of his own opinion. We then reminded him of what he had said about the same thing on a previous occasion.” He (an-Nazzam) continues: "By Allah, I never saw him blush for it or feel ashamed of having done it.”

=== Critique of Abu Hurayra and his reported Hadiths ===
Like other early Mu'tazilites, al-Naẓẓām was a scripturalist who had no use for the traditions and accounts supposedly related by Abu Hurayra, the most prolific ḥadīth narrator, which he held to be full of contradictions. For al-Naẓẓām, the so-called single-source and multiple-source reports, such as the multitudinous narratives attributed to Abu Hurayra, could not be trusted. Al-Naẓẓām bolstered his refutation of the thitherto long-held esteem of the accounts of Abu Hurayra and other contemporaries of Muḥammad (especially among Sunni circles) within the larger claim that such reports circulated and thrived mainly to support and legitimize the polemical causes of various theological sects and jurists and that no single transmitter, be he contemporaneous with Muhammad or not, could by himself be held above suspicion of altering the content of any single report. Al-Naẓẓām’s skepticism involved far more than excluding the possible verification of a report narrated by Abu Hurayra, whether it is traced back to a single source (wāḥid) or many (mutawātir). He also questioned reports of widespread acceptance, which proved pivotal to classical Muʿtazilite criteria devised for verifying the single report, thus earning a special mention for the depth and extent of his skepticism. Ahmad Amin summarized his jurisprudential beliefs by stating:

He used to not believe in Ijma [i.e. judicial consensus], and he used to believe little in Qiyas, and he used to believe little in the authenticity of Hadith reports, and he almost used to believe in nothing other than the Quran and logic.

=== Critique of judicial consensus ===
Al-Naẓẓām's rejection of consensus was primarily due to his rationalist criticism of some of the first generation of Muslims, whom he viewed as possessing defective personalities and intellects. Shi'ite theologians al-Shaykh al-Mufīd and Sharif al-Murtaza held in high esteem al-Naẓẓām's Kitāb al-Nakth (The Book of Dismantling), in which he denied the doctrinal validity of consensus.
