= Maharoof =

Maharoof, or Mahroof, is a Sri Lankan Muslim given name. The name is derived from the Arabic word "ma'ruf" (Arabic: معروف) or "miftahul ma'ruf", an Islamic term meaning that which is commonly known or acknowledged. Notable people with the name include:

- Farveez Maharoof (born 1984), Sri Lankan cricketer
- Imran Maharoof (born 1983), Sri Lankan politician
- M. A. M. Maharoof (born 1957), Sri Lankan politician
- M. E. H. Maharoof (1939–1997), Sri Lankan politician
- Mohamed Mahroof (1950–2012), Sri Lankan politician

== See also ==
- Ma'ruf
