= Istislah =

Concept in Islamic legal philosophy

Istislah (Arabic: استصلاح, lit. 'to deem proper') is a method employed by Islamic jurists to solve problems that find no clear answer in sacred religious texts. It is related to the term مصلحة Maslaha, or "public interest" (both words being derived from the same triconsonantal root, "ṣ-l-ḥ"). Extratextual pragmatic considerations are commonly accepted in Islamic jurisprudence concerning areas where the Qur'an and the practices of the earliest Muslim generations (Salaf) provide no specific guidance.

Istislah bears some similarities to the natural law tradition in the West, as exemplified by Thomas Aquinas. However, whereas natural law deems good that which is known self-evidently to be good, according as it tends towards the fulfilment of the person, istislah calls good whatever is connected to one of five "basic goods". Al-Ghazali abstracted these "basic goods" from the five legal precepts in the Qur'an and Sunnah—religion, life, reason, lineage (or offspring), and property. In this classical formulation, istislah differs from utilitarianism—"the greatest happiness for the greatest number of people"—because something that results in "the greatest happiness" may infringe any one of the five basic values. Rather than utilitarianism, Istislah bears closer resemblance to deontologicalism.

The legal concepts of Istislah and Maslaha attained significant attention in the works of the 20th century Sunni jurist Muḥammad Rashīd Riḍā (d. 1354 A.H/ 1935 C.E), who considered the "no harm no retribution" hadith to be an important textual principle. Citing the Andalusian Malikite jurist Al-Shatibi (d. 790 A.H/ 1388 C.E), Rida elaborated Maslaha as a "basic principle" in legal derivation and distinguished affairs into issues of 'Ibadat (rituals) and Mu'amalat (transactions). The former consists of absolute, unchanging rules; while rules regarding issues of Mu'amalat may vary with time since Revelation is not absolute in all of them. However, unlike the expansive scope of Mu'amalat by Al-Shatibi; Rida divided Mu'amalat issues into two types: i) those that are moral norms and ii) those which are morally irrelevant. The former are similar to the 'Ibadat rules which were Revealed by God who defined moral norms and hence, fixed. Those who break these rules are sinful transgressors. The latter category of issues, can be solved through the process of Qiyas.

In the contemporary era, some human rights are considered "Islamic" using the methods of Istislah and Maslaha. In Egypt, this approach has been backed by the Supreme Constitutional Court, which has ratified equitable measures benefiting women even where these seemingly conflict with principles of classical Shari'ah.

== See also ==
- Istihsan
