= Urf =

Arabic Islamic term meaning societal custom or knowledge

ʿUrf (Arabic: العرف) is an Arabic Islamic term referring to the custom, or 'knowledge', of a given society. It can also be translated as customary law. To be recognized in an Islamic society, ʿurf must in principle be compatible with Sharia, but in practice tensions sometimes exist between the representatives of ʿurf and those of Sharia. When applied, it can lead to the deprecation or inoperability of a certain aspect of fiqh (Islamic jurisprudence).

ʿUrf is a source of Islamic legal rulings where there are no explicit primary texts of the Qur'an and Sunnah specifying the ruling, making it a form of customary law. ʿUrf can also specify something generally established in the primary texts.

== Overview ==
Terminology

The term 'ʿurf', meaning "to know", refers to the customs and practices of a given society.

History

ʿUrf was first recognized by Abu Yusuf (d. 182/798), an early leader of the Ḥanafī school, though it was considered part of the sunnah, i.e genuine and not a formal source. Later al-Sarakhsī (d. 483/1090) opposed it, holding that custom cannot prevail over a written text.

Scriptural basis

The idea that custom is an authoritative source for Islamic law appears in the Quran and Hadith. One hadith narrated by Ibn Mas'ud stated 'Whatever the Muslim saw as good is [considered] good by God, and whatever the Muslim saw as evil is evil according to God.'"

== Relationship to Sharia ==
Although this was not formally included in Islamic law, the Sharia recognizes customs that prevailed at the time of Muhammad but were not abrogated by the Qur'an or the Sunnah (called "Divine Silence"). Practices later innovated are also justified, since Islamic tradition says what the people, in general, consider good is also considered as such by Allah (see God in Islam). According to some sources, ʿurf holds as much authority as 'ijma (consensus), and more than qiyas (legal reasoning by analogy). ʿUrf is the Islamic equivalent of "common law".

In the application of ʿurf, custom that is accepted into law should be commonly prevalent in the region, not merely in an isolated locality. If it is in absolute opposition to Islamic texts, custom is disregarded. However, if it is in opposition to qiyas, custom is given preference. Jurists also tend to, with caution, give precedence to custom over doctoral opinions of highly esteemed scholars.

In some countries such as Egypt, marriage in the ʿurfi way refers to a form of common law marriage that does not involve obtaining official papers issued by the state (زواج عرفي Zawāj ʿUrfi). The validity of that type of marriage is still under debate, and women may have fewer rights than under an officially-registered marriage.

In parts of Yemen where ʿurf plays a significant role (related to the continuing influence of tribal lineages in the country), it often coexists with Sharia. However, ʿurf is promoted by the tribal sheikhs, whereas Sharia judges are either qāḍīs or sādah. Due to this different sociopolitical basis, the actual relationship between both legal phenomena varies from tribe to tribe. They can be seen as fully compatible or as two competing systems. Historically, the Zaydi Imams of Yemen often entered in conflict with local jurisdictions. In some cases they struck an agreement to separate the two jurisdictions by applying Sharia to "personal status matters" and ʿurf to tribal matters.

== See also ==
- Ma'ruf
- Adat
- Sources of Islamic law
- List of Islamic terms in Arabic

== Bibliography ==
- Hasan, Abrar (2004). Principles of modern Islamic jurisprudence. Karachi: Pakistan Academy of Jurists.
- Libson, G.; Stewart, F.H. "ʿUrf." Encyclopaedia of Islam. Edited by: P. Bearman, Th. Bianquis, C.E. Bosworth, E. van Donzel and W.P. Heinrichs. Brill, 2008. Brill Online. 10 April 2008
