= Al-Shatibi =

Al-Shatibi is an Arabic name indicating an origin in Xàtiva (Spain). It may refer to:

- Abu Ishaq al-Shatibi (1320–1388), Andalusian scholar of Maliki fiqh (Islamic jurisprudence)
- Abu al-Qasim al-Shatibi (1144–1194), Andalusian scholar of qira'at (Quran recitation methods)
