= Salihat =

Salihat is an Islamic term for just deeds, one of the overarching themes in the early Meccan Suras of the Qur'an.
