= Wolfhart Heinrichs =

German Arabic scholar (1941–2014)

Wolfhart P. Heinrichs (3 October 1941 – 23 January 2014) was a German scholar of Arabic. He was James Richard Jewett Professor of Arabic at Harvard University, and a co-editor of the second edition of the Encyclopaedia of Islam. He taught Classical Arabic language and literature, particularly Arabic literary theory and criticism.

== Life ==
Wolfhart Heinrichs was born in Cologne into an academic family: his father, H. Matthias Heinrichs, was professor of ancient Germanic studies at the University of Giessen and the Free University of Berlin; his mother, Anne Heinrichs, a lecturer on Old Norse, was made a professor at the Free University at the age of 80.

He was educated at the Friedrich-Wilhelm-Gymnasium in Cologne before studying Islamic studies at the University of Cologne. After a year at the School of Oriental and African Studies in London, he continued studying at the Universities of Frankfurt and Giessen. He gained his PhD in 1967 for a thesis on Hazim al-Qartajanni's reception of Aristotelian poetics, and spent a year at the Orient-Institut Beirut.

Heinrichs taught at Giessen from 1968 to 1977, when he went to Harvard University as a visiting lecturer, and in 1978 took up a permanent position there. In 1980 he married Alma Giese, an independent scholar and translator from Arabic. In 1989 he became a co-editor of the new edition of the Encyclopaedia of Islam, for which he also wrote fifty articles himself. In 1996 he succeeded Muhsin Mahdi as the James Richard Jewett Professor of Arabic at Harvard. A Festschrift was published in 2008.

== Works ==
- Arabische Dichtung und griechische Poetik. Hāzim al-Qartāğannīs Grundlegung d. Poetik mit Hilfe aristotel. Begriffe., Wiesbaden, F. Steiner in Komm., 1969.
- The hand of the northwind : opinions on metaphor and the early meaning of istiʼāra in Arabic poetics, Wiesbaden: Steiner, 1977.
- (ed.) Studies in Neo-Aramaic, Atlanta, Ga.: Scholars Press, 1989.
- (ed. with J. Christoph Bürgel) Orientalisches Mittelalter, Wiesbaden: AULA-Verlag, 1990.
- 'Prosimetrical Genres in Classical Arabic Literature', in J. Harris and K. Reichl, eds., Prosimetrum, Cross-Cultural Perspectives on Narrative in Prose and Poetry, Cambridge: D.S. Brewer, 1997, pp. 249–275
- 'Der Teil und das Ganze: Die Auto-Anthologie Ṣafī al-Dīn al-Ḥillīs', Asiatische Studien 59:3 (2005), pp. 675–696
- (ed. with Peri Bearman and Bernard G. Weiss) The law applied : contextualizing the Islamic Shari'a: a volume in honor of Frank E. Vogel, London; New York : I.B. Tauris, 2008.
- 'Early Ornate Prose and the Rhetorization of Poetry in Arabic Literature', in Frédérique Woerther, ed., Literary and Philosophical Rhetoric in the Greek, Roman, Syriac and Arabic Worlds, Hildesheim etc.: Olms, 2009, 215–234.
- Heinrichs, W. P.; Allen, R.M.A. (2012). "Arabic poetics". In Greene, Roland; et al. (eds.). The Princeton Encyclopedia of Poetry and Poetics (4th rev. ed.). Princeton, NJ: Princeton University Press. pp. 62–65. ISBN 978-0-691-15491-6.
