= Bernard G. Weiss =

American linguist (1933–2018)

Bernard Weiss
- Born: August 10, 1933
- Died: February 8, 2018 (aged 84)

Academic background
- Education: Princeton University (PhD)

Academic work
- Discipline: Linguist and scholar of Islam
- Sub-discipline: Islamic law, Islamic theology, Islamic philosophy, Islamic political thought, Arab history
- Institutions: University of Utah
- Main interests: Muslim discussions of linguistics and the origin of language

Bernard G. Weiss (10 August 1933 – 8 February 2018) was a professor of languages and literature at the University of Utah. He has an extensive publication record and is recognized as one of the foremost scholars in Islamic law, Islamic theology, Islamic philosophy, Islamic political thought, Arab history and Muslim discussions of linguistics and the origin of language.

== Life ==
Weiss received his PhD from Princeton University in 1966.

== Bibliography ==
- Studies in Islamic Law and Society
- Religion and Law: Biblical-judaic and Islamic Perspectives
- Studies in Islamic Legal Theory
- A Survey of Arab History, 1988
- The Spirit of Islamic Law, Athens, Georgia: University of Georgia Press, 1998.
- (ed. with Peri Bearman and Wolfhart Heinrichs) The Law Applied: Contextualizing the Islamic Shari`a, London and New York: I.B. Tauris, 2008.
- The Search for God's Law: Islamic Jurisprudence in the Writings of Sayf al-Din al-Amidi, 2010
- Language in Orthodox Muslim Thought: A Study of "Wad Al-lughah" and Its Development
