= Istihlal =

Islamic term for the defining of halal

Istihlal (Arabic: استحلال istiḥlāl) is a term used in Islamic jurisprudence, or fiqh, to refer to the act of regarding some action as permissible (i.e. halal), although it is impermissible (i.e. haram); the implication is that such a regard is an erroneous and improper distortion of Islamic law. The word "istihlal" is derived as Stem X of the Arabic consonantal root ح-ل-ل meaning "to untie", "to solve", "to dissolve", "to open", "to release", etc.

The term "istihlal" came to prominence in the Western news media on 11 March 2005, the first anniversary of the Madrid bombing attacks of 2004, when the Islamic Commission of Spain (La Comisión Islámica de España) issued a fatwa, or religious opinion, denouncing Osama bin Laden and al-Qaeda for engaging in istihlal with respect to the waging of jihad through terrorism, and the killing of women, children, and noncombatants.

The opposite of istihlal is called istihram: declaring something which is permissible to be impermissible.
