= Abu Ishaq al-Shatibi =

Moorish scholar

Abū Isḥāq al-Shāṭibī أبو إسحاق الشاطبي

Personal life
- Born: Granada, Nasri Kingdom
- Died: Sha'ban 8, 790 A.H/1388 C.E
- Region: al-Andalus
- Main interest(s): Fiqh, Usul al-Fiqh, Hadith, Tafsir, Arabic grammar, Linguistic

Religious life
- Religion: Islam
- Denomination: Sunni
- Jurisprudence: Maliki
- Creed: Ash'ari
- Arabic name
- Personal (Ism): Ibrāhīm
- Patronymic (Nasab): ibn Mūsā ibn Muḥammad
- Teknonymic (Kunya): Abū Isḥāq
- Toponymic (Nisba): al-Shāṭibī; al-Lakẖmī; al-Gharnāṭī

Abū Isḥāq Ibrāhīm ibn Mūsā al-Shāṭibī (720–790 AH/1320 – 1388 C.E.) was an Andalusí Sunni Islamic scholar. He was regarded in his time as among the leading jurist and legal theoretician in the Maliki school of law. He was well-versed in the science of hadith and Quranic interpretation. He was an eminent grammarian, linguist, and literary figure. He was considered the greatest scholar in Al-Andalus of his time and one of the most influential figures in the Maliki school.

== Early life ==
=== Birth ===
There is no solid information about the Imam's birth year. However, the range that is believed to exist is 720H/1320CE to 730H/1330CE. He was born into a humble and impoverished family in the city of Granada which was the capital of Nasri Kingdom under the reign of Sultan Muhammad V al-Ghani Billah at the time.

=== Education ===
He had never been outside of Granada, not for study or Hajj. He studied with Granada's finest intellectuals, gaining mastery over various disciplines of knowledge at the period. Al-Shatibi specialised in Qur'anic exegesis (tafsir), Prophetic traditions (hadith), Islamic jurisprudence (fiqh), principles of Islamic jurisprudence (usul al-fiqh), Arabic language and grammar, as well as treatises on medicine and history. His youth coincided with the Nasri Kingdom. Due to its growth and affluence, Granada became a popular destination for academics from across North Africa. The greatest scholars of al-Shatibi's era, such as Ibn Khaldun and Ibn al-Khatib, had either been linked to the Nasri court or had visited Granada. As a result, the city has grown to become an important centre of learning.

=== Teachers ===
As was customary at the time, al-Shatibi received his early education in Arabic language, grammar, and literature. Abu Abdullah Muhammad al-Biri (d. 754H/1353CE), dubbed the "master of grammarians" (Shaykh al-Nuhat) in Andalus, was his first instructor in Arabic language and grammar. After Al-Biri's passing, Shatibi completed his study of Arabic language and grammar with Abu al-Qasim al-Sharif al-Sibti (d. 760H/1358CE). Al-Sibti's greatness in the Arabic language and grammar earned him the title "The Bearer of the Standard of Rhetoric." He was also highly regarded by al-Timbukti, who referred to him as "Ra'is al-'Ulum alLisaniyyah" (The King of Linguistics).

Al-Shatibi learned fiqh from the renowned Andalusian jurist Abu Sa'id ibn Lubb, who served as Granada's khatib (preacher) and mufti. For his fiqh education, he owed a great deal to his mentor Ibn Lubb, although they later got into arguments over a number of different topics.

The Marini ruler, Sultan Abu Inan Faris appointed Abu Abdullah al-Maqqari as the Chief Qadi (judge), making him the most well-known disciple of al-Shatibi. In 757H/1356CE, the Sultan despatched him on a diplomatic trip to Granada; however, the Nasri Sultan later imprisoned him and deported him back to Fez. There, he was tried and found guilty. Al-Maqqari was given the title "muhaqqiq" due to his eminence in Maliki fiqh. He also wrote on tasawwuf, Arabic grammar, and usul al-fiqh. Additionally, he introduced al-Shatibi to a sufi order.

Al-Shatibi owes two illustrious scholars for his understanding of the rational sciences, or 'ulum al-aqliyyah. First among them was Abu Ali Mansur al-Zawawi, who influenced the former's theological and philosophical understanding. He resided in Granada from 753H/1352CE until 765H/1363CE before being banished. The second of them, Abu Abdullah al-Sharif al-Tilmisani (d. 771H/1369CE), was regarded by his contemporaries as "The Most Knowledgeable Man" and had acquired the status of mujtahid. One of his greatest works in Usul al-Fiqh is Miftah al-Usul ila Bina al-Furu' 'ala al-Usul, or The Key to Building the Branches on the Roots of Islamic Jurisprudence.

Other instructors whose records have been included in the Imam's biography are Abu Abdullah of Valencia, Abu Ja'far al-Shaquri of Granada, and Ibn Marzuq al-Khatib al-Tilmisani. It is stated that the latter was regarded as the Shaykh al-Islam of his era. Under the tutelage of the renowned scholar of his era, al-Shatibi studied Al-Muwatta’ of Imam Malik and Sahih al-Bukhari.

== Students ==
Due to lack of biographical documentation, little is known about Al-Shatibi's students. Al-Timbukti did, however, make reference to three of his pupils. The most well-known were the two brothers, Abu Bakr ibn 'Asim and Abu Yahya ibn 'Asim. Later on, the latter was appointed chief Qadi of Granada and is renowned for his Tuhfat al-Hukkam (Gift for the Rulers), a collection of rules compiled for Granada's judges. On the battlefield, his brother Abu Yahya was martyred. Abu Abdullah al-Bayani was the third pupil of the Imam.

Two additional of the Imam's disciples were named by Abul-Ajfan: Abu Ja'far al-Qassar and Abu Abdullah al-Majari, who wrote the Imam's first biography, which we already discussed.

== Death ==
On Sha'ban 8, 790H/1388CE, this illustrious interdisciplinary Imam of the fourteenth-century al-Andalus departed from this life. This date was verified by one of the Imam's most well-known pupils, Abu Yahya ibn 'Asim, in his Nayl al-Muna, an abbreviated version of Al-Muwafaqat. The verse reads, "Until his life came to an end in the year of ninety in seven hundred."

== Legacy ==
One of the few classical jurists who is regarded as being heavily relied upon by contemporary writers on usul al-fiqh is Imam al-Shatibi. His theories of maqasid al-Shariah and Maslahah are widely studied and frequently noticed in the creation of modern laws and in the search for concepts for the larger agenda of civilizational renewal. This is mostly due to the fact that these beliefs were developed in response to the problems, difficulties, and societal shifts of his period, which was an extremely affluent and thriving al-Andalus.

Rashid Rida and other contemporary academics regarded him as one of the eighth and fourteenth-century "mujaddids", or religious revivalists of the century, on par with Ibn Khaldun. In a similar spirit, 'Abd al-Muta'al al-Sa'idi (d. 1386H/1966CE) expressed his opinion, adding that Imam al-Shafi'i and al-Shatibi are ranked similarly in terms of significance.

== Works ==
It was not until the nineteenth century that the works of Imam al-Shatibi became almost unknown in the modern world. In 1884, Tunis published the first edition of his masterpiece, Al-Muwafaqat. His background was little understood before then. The renowned writings of the Imam came to be acknowledged as modern Islamic legal systems' masterworks. Thus far, Imam al-Shatibi's biographies have documented the following treatises, which are primarily in the areas of Arabic grammar and fiqh:

1. Al-Muwafaqat ("The Reconciliation of the fundamentals of Islamic Law"), this is regarded as his greatest work and his magnum opus. He is greatly owed by contemporary writers on usul al-fiqh for this masterwork. The notions of maslahah (public interest/welfare) and maqasid al-Shari'ah (higher purposes of the Shari’ah), which are frequently mentioned in modern Islamic legal theories that primarily draw from al-Shatibi’s work, are particularly elaborated upon. Here, al-Shatibi adhered to the Hanafi methodology of drawing rules and principles from the Qur'an and Sunnah (tariqah al-Hanafiyyin, or jurists' method). By applying this technique, he discovered that the fundamental idea of all Sharia rulings was maslahah. Additionally, he was one of the few Maliki scholars who combined Hanafi School with Maliki School teachings.
2. Kitab al-Itisam ("The Book of Adherence"): often known as The Book of Adherence, is one of Imam al-Shatibi's most well-known books. The subject of the two-volume work is bid'ah, or poisonous innovation, which the Imam has strongly denounced. Additionally, he makes a distinction between maslahah mursalah (public interest), istihsan (jurisprudential choice), and bid'ah here. Al-Shatibi comes to the conclusion that two things typically contribute to such deviations in Islamic legal traditions: a lack of understanding of the Arabic language and its intrinsic meaning in religious literature, as well as a lack of awareness of the goals and purposes of the Shari’ah. Bid’ah has led to heresies and deviations in Islamic legal traditions. Muhammad Rashid Rida introduced al-Shatibi and his writings in his al-Manar, frequently referring to al-Shatibi as a “warrior against bid'ah”.
3. Sharh ‘Ala al-Khulasa fi al-Nahw ("Explanation on the Summary of Arabic Grammar"), this is a four volume commentary on Ibn Malik’s al Khulasa al-Alfiyya. Al-Timbukti holds this as “an unprecedented work on Arabic grammar!”
4. ‘Unwan al-Ittifaq fi ‘Ilm al-Ishtiqaq ("Addressing the Agreement in Science of Derivation"), it's a book on Arabic morphology.
5. Kitab Usul al-Nahw ("Principles of Arabic Grammar"), both of the above mentioned books are on Arabic grammar, which Imam al-Shatibi also mentioned in his Sharh ‘Ala al-Khulasa fi al-Nahw. However al-Timbukti mentioned that al-Shatibi destroyed these works during his lifetime for reasons not described by his biographers.
6. Kitab al-Majalis, this is a commentary on the chapter of sale (buyu’) of Sahih al-Bukhari.
7. Al-Ifadat wal-Inshadat (Testimonies and Recitations): a treatise on Arabic literature edited by Abul Ajfan and published in Beirut in 1983.
8. Fatawa ("Legal Verdicts"), the several fatawa that al-Shatibi presented were eventually collected by Abul Ajfan, despite the fact that he did not compose or compile them into a single volume. It has sixty fatawa covering topics such as salat, ijtihad, zakah, vows, slaughter, punishments, inheritance, creativity, and so on.

== Sources ==
Tawfique Al-Mubarak (January 2015). Imam al-Shatibi: The Master Architect of Maqasid (PDF). Switzerland: International Association of Insurance Supervisors. pp. 1–6.
