= Index of Islam-related articles =

This article includes an alphabetical list of topics related to Islam, the history of Islam, Islamic culture, and the present-day Muslim world. The list is intended to provide inspiration for the creation of new articles and categories. This list is not complete; please add to it as needed. This list may contain multiple transliterations of the same word: please do not delete the multiple alternative spellings—instead, please make redirects to the appropriate pre-existing Wikipedia article if one is present.

== 0-9 ==
- 99 Names of God

== A ==
- A'lam
- A'maal
- A'uzu billahi minashaitanir rajim
- A. R. Rahman
- Aalim
- Aaron
- Aash Al Maleek
- Aashurah
- Ababda
- Abar Ali
- Abaya
- Abbadid
- Abbas
- Abbas I of Persia
- Abbasid Caliphate
- Abbasid invasion of Asia Minor (782)
- Abbasid invasion of Asia Minor (806)
- Abd al-Malik ibn Salih
- Abd al-Qadir al-Jaza'iri
- Abd Allah ibn Abd al-Muttalib
- Abd Allah ibn Zubayr
- Abdallah ibn Abd al-Malik
- Abd ar-Rahman al-Haydari al-Kaylani
- 'Abd Shams
- Abdel Aziz al-Rantissi
- Abdelaziz Bouteflika
- Abdest
- Abdoldjavad Falaturi
- Abdul Aziz al-Hakim
- Abdul Kalam
- Abdul Karim Qassim
- Abdul Qadir Jilani
- Abdul Rahman Munif
- Abdullah I of Jordan
- Abdullah II of Jordan
- Abdullah Yusuf Ali
- Abdullah Yusuf Azzam
- Abdullah of Saudi Arabia
- Abdur-Rahman ibn 'Awf
- Abdurrahman Wahid
- Abdus Salam
- Abjad
- Abjad numerals
- Ablution
- Abolhassan Banisadr
- Abraham in Islam
- Abrahamic religion
- Abrogation
- Abu Al Fazal Abdul Wahid Yemeni Tamimi
- Abu al-Qasim al-Zahrawi
- Abu Bakar Bashir
- Abu Bakr
- Abu Ghraib prisoner abuse
- Abu Hurairah
- Abu Mansur Al Maturidi
- Abu Muhammad Lulu al-Kabir
- Abu Musab al-Zarqawi
- Abu Muslim
- Abu Nasr Mansur
- Abu Saeed Mubarak Makhzoomi
- Abu Sufiyan ibn Harb
- Abu Talib
- Abu'l-Hasan al-Uqlidisi
- Abu'l Qasim (Seljuk governor of Nicaea)
- Adal Sultanate
- Adam
- Adam and Eve
- Adem
- Adewale Ayuba
- Adhan
- 'Adl
- Afghanistan
- Aghlabid
- Ahkam
- Ahl al-Hadith
- Ahl ar-ra'y
- Ahlul-Bayt
- Ahl-i Hadith
- Ahmad ibn Fadlan
- Ahmad Tejan Kabbah
- Ahmadi
- Ahmadiyya Muslim Community
- Ahmadou Ahidjo
- Ahmed Ben Bella
- Ahmed H. Zewail
- Ahmed Qurei
- Ahmed Raza Khan
- Ahmed Shah Massoud
- Ahmed Sékou Touré
- Ahmed Urabi
- Ahmed Yassin
- Ahmet Necdet Sezer
- Ahwat
- Ahzab
- Aisha
- Akbar
- Akbar Hashemi Rafsanjani
- Akhirah
- Al Battani
- Al Imran
- Al Jazeera
- Al-Abbas ibn al-Ma'mun
- Al-Abbas ibn al-Walid
- Al-Afdal Shahanshah
- Al-Andalus
- Al-Aqsa Intifada (Second Intifada)
- Al-asharatu mubashshirun
- Al-'Awasim
- Al-Azhar Shia Fatwa
- Al-Azhar University
- Al-Biruni
- Al-Dahhak ibn Qays al-Shaybani
- Al-Dinawari
- Al-Farabi
- Al-Farghani
- Al-Fil
- Al-Ghazali
- Al-Hajjaj bin Yousef
- Al-Hakim bi-Amr Allah
- Al-Hallaj
- Al-hamdu lillahi rabbil 'alamin
- Ali
- Al-Ikhlas
- Al-isra
- Al-Jazari
- Al-Kafirun
- Al-Khidr
- Al-Khwarizmi
- Al-Kindi
- Al-Ma'ida
- Al-Ma'un
- Al-Mahdi
- Al-Mansur
- Al-Masad
- Al-Masudi
- Al-Mawardi
- Al-Mundhir
- Al-Mutawakkil
- Al-Qaeda
- Al-Safa and Al-Marwah
- Al-Tirmidhi
- Al-urf
- Alawite
- Alchemy
- Ale Muhammad
- Aleppo
- Alevi
- Algeria
- Alhamdulillah
- Alhazen
- Alhurra
- Ali
- Ali al-Hadi
- Ali al-Sistani
- Ali ar-Rida
- Ali Hassan Mwinyi
- Ali ibn Abi Talib
- Ali ibn Husayn
- Ali ibn Yahya al-Armani
- Ali Khamenei
- Ali Muhammad Ghedi
- Ali Shariati
- Alija Izetbegovic
- Alim
- Alkali
- Allah
- Allahu Akbar
- Almohad Caliphate
- Almoravid dynasty
- Almsgiving
- Alp Arslan
- Amal Movement
- Amin
- Amin al-Husayni
- Amin Maalouf
- Amir
- Amir al-mumineen
- Amman
- Amman Message
- Amr bil Ma-roof
- Amr ibn al-As
- An-Nas
- An-Nasr
- An-Nisa
- Anabasis (Xenophon)
- Ancient warfare
- Andalusi Arabic
- Angel
- Angels
- Ansar
- Anwar Sadat
- Apostasy in Islam
- Aqabah
- Aqidah
- Arab
- Arab Charter on Human Rights
- Arab music
- Arab nationalism
- Arab world
- Arab–Israeli conflict
- Arabesque
- Arabic alphabet
- Arabic grammar
- Arabic language
- Arabic literature
- Arabic name
- Arabist
- Arabs
- Araf
- Arafah
- Arafat
- Aramaic language
- Architectural history
- Arkan al-Islam
- Ardalani, Elvia
- Arsh
- Art Blakey
- As-Salih Ayyub
- As-Salih Ismail al-Malik
- Asabiyyah
- Asharite
- Ashgabat
- Ashura
- Askia Mohammad I
- Asr
- Assalamu alaikum
- Astaghfirullah
- Aurangzeb
- Averroes
- Avicenna
- Awqiyyah
- Awrah
- Axum
- Ayah
- Ayat
- Ayatollah
- Ayman al-Zawahiri
- Ayub Khan
- Ayyubid dynasty
- Azaan
- Azerbaijani language
- Azrael
- A Common Word Between Us and You

== B ==
- Ba'ath Party
- Baab-al-Salaam
- Babur
- Badar
- Badiyyah
- Badr
- Baghdad
- Bahrainona
- Baibars
- Baitul Maqdis
- Baitul Mukarram
- Bakkah
- Baku
- Baligh
- Bam
- Bangladesh
- Bani Isra'il
- Banten
- Banu Abd Shams
- Banu Hashim
- Banu Isam
- Baqi (disambiguation)
- Barakah
- Barakallah
- Basmala
- Bassam Tibi
- Batil
- Battle of Badr
- Battle of Tabouk
- Battle of Talas
- Bawadi
- Bay'ah
- Bayt al-mal
- Belly dance
- Benazir Bhutto
- Bengali language
- Bengali Muslims
- Berber
- Berber languages
- Bernard Lewis
- Bholoo Shah
- Bi'thah
- Bible
- Bid‘ah
- Bilal ibn Ribah
- Bir Sreshtho
- Bismillah
- Bismillahir rahmanir rahim
- Black September in Jordan
- Black Stone
- Boron
- Bosniaks
- Bosnian Cyrillic
- Bosnian language
- British Mandate of Palestine
- British Raj
- Brunei
- Bukhari
- Bulugh
- Bumiputra
- Buraq
- Burji dynasty
- Burka
- Burqah
- Busr
- Buwayhid
- Byblos
- Báb
- Bábís

== C ==
- Cairo
- Cairo Declaration on Human Rights in Islam
- Caliph
- Calligraphy
- Cat Stevens
- Caucasian Avars
- Cave of the Patriarchs
- Chad
- Chador
- Challenge of the Quran
- Chand Raat
- Charity
- Chechen language
- Chinese Islamic cuisine
- Chittagong
- Christian Zionism
- Christianity and Islam
- Christians
- Cologne mosque project
- Colonial Heads of Algeria
- Comoros
- Constitution of Medina
- Constitution of Pakistan
- Council on American-Islamic Relations
- Covenant
- Creation myth
- Creed
- Crescent
- Criticism of Islam
- Criticism of Muhammad
- Criticism of the Qur'an
- Crusades
- Cultural Muslim
- Culture of Saudi Arabia
- Culture of Tajikistan

== D ==
- Da'iy
- Da'wah
- Daf
- Dajjal
- Danishmends
- Dar al-Islam
- Darfur conflict
- Date (fruit)
- David
- Dawood
- Dawoodi Bohras
- Deen
- Deir al-Madinah
- Dervish
- Dhabihah
- Dhikr
- Dhimmi
- Dhu'n-Nurayn
- Dhuhr
- Dhu'l-Hijja
- Dhu'l-Qa'da
- Din
- Dirham
- Djibouti
- Dodecanese
- Dome of the Rock
- Donmeh
- Dost Mahommed Khan
- Druze
- Du'a
- Du'at
- Dubai
- Dunya
- Durood

== E ==
- Early Muslim philosophy
- Ecology of Africa
- Economy of Sudan
- Edward Said
- Egypt
- Egyptian Islamic Jihad
- Egyptian language
- Ehsan Jami
- Eid al-Fitr
- Eid Mubarak
- Eid ul-Ad'haa
- Eid ul-Adha
- Eid ul-Fitr
- Eid-e Ghadeer
- Eid-e Mubahala
- Eid-ul-Adha
- Eid-ul-Fitr
- Elijah
- Elijah Muhammad
- Elohim
- Muhammad Emin Er
- Emin Pasha
- Emir
- Emirates
- Eritrea
- Ethics in religion
- Eurabia
- European influence in Afghanistan
- Ex-Muslim
- Ex-Muslims

== F ==
- Fahd of Saudi Arabia
- Faisal of Saudi Arabia
- Fajr
- Fakir
- Falak
- Fallujah
- Faqih
- faqir
- Faraizi movement
- Fard
- Farouk of Egypt
- Fasiq
- Fasting
- Fatah
- Fatemeh is Fatemeh
- Fatiha
- Fatimah
- Fatima Jinnah
- Fatima Mernissi
- Fatima Zahra
- Fatimid
- Fatwa
- Fazal Ilahi Chaudhry
- Fazlollah Zahedi
- Fazlur Rahman
- Female genital cutting
- Feminist tafsir
- Fidyah and Kaffara
- Fiqh
- First Anglo-Afghan War
- First cause
- Fitna
- Fitrah
- Five Pillars of Islam
- Foreign relations of Iran
- Four Rightly Guided Caliphs
- French rule in Algeria
- Friday prayers
- Fuqaha
- Fur language
- Futuwa

== G ==
- G-breve
- Gaafar Nimeiry
- Gabriel (archangel)
- Gamal Abdel Nasser
- Genghis Khan
- Genie
- Genocide of Ottoman Turks and Muslims
- Gertrude Bell
- Ghadeer
- Ghadir Khom
- Ghayr mahram
- Ghazal
- Ghazi
- Ghaznavid Empire
- Ghazwah
- Ghulam Ishaq Khan
- Ghusl
- Glossary of Islam
- God
- Gog
- Golden Horde
- Gospel of Barnabas
- Gotthelf Bergsträsser
- Grand Mufti
- Guardian Council
- Gum arabic

== H ==
- Ha-Mim
- Habib Bourguiba
- Hadath-Akbar
- Hadeeth
- Hadith
- Hadith qudsi
- Hafiz
- Hafsa bint Umar
- Hajarul Aswad
- Hajj
- Hakeem Noor-ud-Din
- Halaal
- Halal certification in Australia
- Hamad bin Khalifa
- Haman (Islam)
- Hamas
- Hamid Karzai
- Hamza
- Hamza Yusuf
- Hand of Fatima
- Hanif
- Haq
- Haraam
- Haram
- Harun
- Harun al-Rashid
- Hasan
- Hasan al-Askari
- Hasan bin Ali
- Hashemite
- Hashim
- Hashish
- Hashshashin
- Hassan al Turabi
- Hassaniya
- Heads of State of Rif
- Hebrew language
- Hebrew name
- Hebron
- Hejaz
- Hell
- Hermeneutics of feminism in Islam
- Hezbollah
- Hijaab
- Hijab
- Hijra (Islam)
- Hijri calendar
- Hilāl
- Hima
- Hindi
- Hindu–Muslim unity
- Hindu Kush
- Hira
- history of Bangladesh
- History of Iran
- History of Iraq
- History of Islam
- History of Kuwait
- History of Nigeria
- History of Pakistan
- History of Somalia
- History of Sudan
- History of Turkey
- History of Uzbekistan
- Holidays in Iran
- Holidays in Pakistan
- Holy Land
- Honor killing
- Hoor, Iran
- Hosni Mubarak
- Houri
- House of Saud
- Hudna
- Hudud
- Hugo Grotius
- Husain
- Husayn bin Ali
- Huseyn Shaheed Suhrawardy
- Hussein of Jordan
- Hyder Ali

== I ==
- I am that I am
- Iajuddin Ahmed
- Ibaadah
- Ibadah
- Iblis
- Ibn Arabi
- Ibn Bajjah
- Ibn Battuta
- Ibn Hazm
- Ibn Hisham
- Ibn Ishaq
- Ibn Kathir
- Ibn Khaldun
- Ibn Khallikan
- Ibn Saud
- Ibn Taymiya
- Ibn Warraq
- Ibrahim (name)
- Ibrahim Ahmad Abd al-Sattar Muhammad
- Iddah
- Idi Amin
- Idries Shah
- Idris I of Libya
- Ifrit
- Iftaar
- Iftar
- Ignaz Goldziher
- Ihraam
- Ihram
- I'jaz
- Ijma
- Ijtihad
- Ilhaam
- Ilkhanate
- Imam
- Imam Abu Hanifa
- Imam Hanbal
- Imam Mahdi
- Imam Shafi
- Imam Shamil
- Iman (concept)
- Iman Darweesh Al Hams
- Imran Khan
- In sha' allah
- Inayat Khan
- Inclusivism
- India
- Indonesia
- Indonesian language
- Infancy Gospel of Thomas
- Injil
- Inna lillahi wa inna ilayhi raji'un
- Inshallah
- Interfaith Conference of Metropolitan Washington
- International Islamic Unity Conference (Iran)
- International Islamic Unity Conference (US)
- Intifada (First)
- Intifada (Second)
- Iqamah
- Iran
- Iran hostage crisis
- Iran's nuclear program
- Iran–Iraq War
- Iranian monarchy
- Iranian Revolution
- Iraq
- Iraqi National Congress
- Iraqi Special Tribunal
- Irshad Manji
- Islamic advice literature
- Islamic calendar (Lunar Hijri calendar)
- Islamic feminism
- Islamic feminist views on dress codes
- Islamic literature
- Islamic Unity week
- Isa
- Isaac
- Isha
- Ishmael
- Isidore of Seville
- Iskander Mirza
- Islam
- Islam and animals
- Islam and anti-Semitism
- Islam and clothing
- Islam and domestic violence
- Islam and flat-earth theories
- Islam and Judaism
- Islam and other religions
- Islam as a political movement
- Islam by country
- Islam in Afghanistan
- Islam in Albania
- Islam in Algeria
- Islam in Asia
- Islam in Australia
- Islam in Azerbaijan
- Islam in Bangladesh
- Islam in Bosnia and Herzegovina
- Islam in Brazil
- Islam in Bulgaria
- Islam in Cambodia
- Islam in Canada
- Islam in Chad
- Islam in China
- Islam in Comoros
- Islam in Côte d'Ivoire
- Islam in Egypt
- Islam in Ethiopia
- Islam in France
- Islam in Germany
- Islam in Ghana
- Islam in Guyana
- Islam in India
- Islam in Indonesia
- Islam in Iran
- Islam in Ireland
- Islam in Italy
- Islam in Jordan
- Islam in Kazakhstan
- Islam in Kyrgyzstan
- Islam in Libya
- Islam in Malaysia
- Islam in Maldives
- Islam in Mali
- Islam in Mauritania
- Islam in Mauritius
- Islam in Nigeria
- Islam in Oman
- Islam in Pakistan
- Islam in Philippines
- Islam in Russia
- Islam in Saudi Arabia
- Islam in Singapore
- Islam in Somalia
- Islam in South Africa
- Islam in Sri Lanka
- Islam in Sudan
- Islam in Thailand
- Islam in the Netherlands
- Islam in the United States
- Islam in Turkey
- Islam in Turkmenistan
- Islam in Uganda
- Islam in Uzbekistan
- Islam in Yemen
- Islamic architecture
- Islamic calendar
- Islamic Courts Union
- Islamic democracy
- Islamic economics
- Islamic ethics
- Islamic eschatology
- Islamic extremism
- Islamic fundamentalism
- Islamic Golden Age
- Islamic Jihad
- Islamic mythology
- Islamic organisations in Australia
- Islamic philosophy
- Islamic republic
- Islamic schools and branches
- Islamic science
- Islamic state in Palestine
- Islamic view of marriage
- Islamic view of miracles
- Islamic views of homosexuality
- Islam Yes, Islamic Party No
- Islamic world
- Islamism
- Islamist terrorism
- Islamization of knowledge
- Islamology
- Islamonline.net
- Islamophobia
- Islam Karimov
- Isma'el
- Ismaeel
- Ismah
- Ismail
- Ismail al-Faruqi
- Ismaili
- Ismail ibn Sharif
- Isnad
- Isra and Miraj
- Istanbul
- Istighfar
- Itmam al-Hujjah

== J ==
- Ja'far
- Jaahil
- Jabalia
- Jābir ibn Hayyān
- Jacob
- Jafar Sadiq
- Jahannam
- Jahiliyyah
- Jalal al-Din Muhammad Rumi
- Jalbab
- Jama masjid
- Jama'at al-Tawhid wal Jihad
- Jamaat-e-Islami Pakistan
- Jannah
- Javanese language
- Jazakallahu khayran
- Jean-Bédel Bokassa
- Jericho
- Jerusalem
- Jesus
- Jews
- Jews in the Middle Ages
- Jihad
- Jihad Watch
- Jinn
- Jizyah
- John Walker Lindh
- John Wansbrough
- Jon Elia
- Jonah
- Joseph (Hebrew Bible)
- Judeo-Islamic tradition
- Judæo-Arabic languages
- Jum'ah
- Juma Khan
- Jumu'ah musjid
- Juz'
- Jürgen Möllemann

== K ==
- Ka'ba
- Ka'bah
- Kaaba
- Kaafir
- Kabul
- Kafir
- Kalaam-e-majeed
- Kalam
- Kalam cosmological argument
- Kalimah
- Kandahar
- Kanem-Bornu Empire
- Karachi
- Karbala
- Kareem Abdul-Jabbar
- Karen Armstrong
- Kashf
- Kebab
- Kedah
- Keffiyeh
- Kelantan
- Kemal Atatürk
- Kenan Evren
- Kenneth Bigley
- Khadija
- Khaleda Zia
- Khalid al-Mihdhar
- Khalid bin Walid
- Khalid of Saudi Arabia
- Khalid Shaikh Mohammed
- Khalifa
- Khan Abdul Ghaffar Khan
- Khan Yunis
- Kahndaq
- Kharaj
- Kharijites
- Khat
- Khatib
- Khilaal
- Khums
- Khutba
- Khutbah
- Khwarezmid Empire
- King of Morocco
- Kingdom of Nekor
- Kitáb-i-Aqdas
- Knidos
- Konstantinos Kanaris
- Konya
- Koran
- Kordofan
- Kufa
- Kuffar
- Kufr
- Kurdish language
- Kurta
- Kuwait

== L ==
- La hawla wa la quwwata illa billah
- La ilaha illallah
- Laat
- Labbaik
- Labuan
- Lahore
- Lahore Ahmadiyya Movement
- Lal Bahadur Shastri
- Last Prophet
- Latakia
- Laylat al-Qadr
- Lebanon
- Leo Africanus
- Letter to Baghdadi
- Levant
- Levantine Arabic
- Leyla al-Qadr
- Liberal movements within Islam
- Libya
- List of Arabic phrases
- List of companions of the prophet Muhammad
- List of Islamophobic incidents
- List of Islamic terms in Arabic
- List of Muslims
- List of Muslim feminists
- List of Muslim scientists
- List of prime ministers of Egypt
- List of religious topics
- Lod
- Louis Farrakhan
- Lunar calendar
- Lungi

== M ==
- Ma malakat aymanukum
- Ma'ruf
- Muadh ibn Jabal
- Madhhab
- Madina
- Member states of the Organisation of Islamic Cooperation
- Madinah
- Madinan sura
- Madrassa
- Maghazi
- Maghreb
- Maghrebi Arabic
- Maghrib prayer
- Mah
- Mahathir Mohamad
- Mahdi
- Maher Arar
- Mahmoud Abbas
- Mahmoud Hessaby
- Mahmud I
- Mahr
- Mahram
- Maimonides
- Makka
- Makkah
- Makkan surah
- Makruh
- Malay language
- Malcolm X
- Maldives
- Malik
- Malik Ibn Anas
- Mani
- Marja
- Marmaduke Pickthall
- Marwan al-Shehhi
- Maryam (sura)
- Masah
- Masjed
- Masjid
- Masjid-u-Shajarah
- Masjid-ul-Haram
- Maslaha
- Maulana Abul Kalam Azad
- Maulana Wahiduddin Khan
- Maumoon Abdul Gayoom
- Mawla
- Mayyit
- Mazi
- Mawla
- Mecca
- Mecca-Cola
- Medieval medicine of Western Europe
- Medina
- Meeqat
- Megawati Sukarnoputri
- Meher Baba
- Mehr
- Messiah
- Mi'raj
- Middle East
- Mihrab
- Mina
- Minaret
- Minbar
- Miracles of Muhammad
- Mir-Hossein Mousavi
- Mirza Ghulam Ahmad
- Mirza Basheer-ud-Din Mahmood Ahmad
- Mirza Nasir Ahmad
- Mirza Tahir Ahmad
- Mirza Masroor Ahmad
- Miswaak
- Mizrahi Jew
- Modern Islamic philosophy
- Mohamed al-Kahtani
- Mohammad Abaee-Khorasani
- Mohammad Ali Abtahi
- Mohammad Ali Jinnah
- Mohammad Ali Shah Qajar
- Mohammad Hatta
- Mohammad Javad Bahonar
- Mohammad Khatami
- Mohammad Najibullah
- Mohammad Rabbani
- Mohammad Reza Aref
- Mohammad Reza Khatami
- Mohammad Reza Pahlavi
- Mohammad Sadeq al-Sadr
- Mohammad Shah
- Mohammad Sharif
- Mohammad-Reza Shajarian
- Mohammed Abdullah Hassan
- Mohammed Arkoun
- Mohammed Atef
- Mohamed Atta
- Mohammed Bahr al-Uloum
- Mohammed Bouyeri
- Mohammed Jamal Khalifa
- Mohammed Mossadegh
- Mohammed Omar
- Mohammed Qalamuddin
- Mohammed VI of Morocco
- Mohammed
- Mohyeddin
- Monotheism
- Moors
- Mordechai
- Morocco
- Moses
- Moslem (Muslim)
- Mosque
- Moulvi Ibrahim
- Mountain Jews
- Mozarab
- Mt. Uhud
- Mu'min
- Mu'tazili
- Muadh-dhin
- Muammar al-Gaddafi
- Muawiyah I
- Mu'awiyah ibn Hisham
- Muezzin
- Mufti
- Mughal Empire
- Muhajir
- Muhammad the World-Changer: An Intimate Portrait
- Muhammad Ahmad
- Muhammad al-Baqir
- Muhammad al-Durrah
- Muhammad al-Idrisi
- Muhammad al-Mahdi
- Muhammad Ali
- Muhammad Ali Jinnah
- Muhammad Ali of Egypt
- Muhammad Asadullah Al-Ghalib
- Muhammad at-Taqi
- Muhammad bin Qasim
- Muhammad bin Saud
- Muhammad ibn Abd al Wahhab
- Muhammad ibn Marwan
- Muhammad ibn Zakariya al-Razi
- Muhammad in Islam
- Muhammad Iqbal
- Muhammad Naguib
- Muhammad, overview of all perspectives
- Muhammad Rafiq Tarar
- Muhammad Saeed al-Sahhaf
- Muhammad Thakurufar Al-Azam
- Muhammad V an-Nasir
- Muhammad VI al-Habib
- Muhammad Yunus
- Muhammad Zia-ul-Haq
- Muhammed Ali Jinnah
- Muharram
- Mujahid
- Mujahideen
- Mujtahid
- Mulatto
- Mullah
- Multan
- Munafiq
- Munich Massacre
- Municipalities of Libya
- Muqaddimah
- Muqtada al-Sadr
- Murabit
- Musa (prophet)
- Musa al-Kazim
- Musa bin Nusair
- Musaylimah
- Mushaf
- Mushrik
- Mushrikeen
- Music of Afghanistan
- Music of Pakistan
- Music of Saudi Arabia
- Music of Spain
- Music of Turkey
- Music of Uzbekistan
- Muslim
- Muslim American Society
- Muslim b. al-Hajjaj
- Muslim Brotherhood
- Muslim dietary laws
- Muslim League
- Muslim Student Association
- Muxlim
- Mustahab
- Muzdalifah

== N ==
- Nabataeans
- Nabi
- Nablus
- Nabuwwat
- Nadhr
- Nadir Shah
- Nafl
- Naim Frashëri
- Naja
- Najasat
- Najis
- Nakba
- Names of God
- Names of Jerusalem
- Names of the Levant
- Naseem Hamed
- Nasir al-Din Tusi
- Nasr ibn Sayyar
- Nasreddin
- Nation of Islam
- Nation of Islam and anti-Semitism
- Negeri Sembilan
- New Delhi
- Night Journey
- Nikkah
- Niyya
- Niyyah
- Noah
- Northern Areas, Pakistan
- Nuh
- Nuh Ha Mim Keller
- Nur Muhammad Taraki
- Nusrat Fateh Ali Khan

== O ==
- Occupations of Palestine
- Oman
- Omar Abdel-Rahman
- Omar Bongo
- Omar Hasan Ahmad al-Bashir
- Omar Khayyám
- Operation Ajax
- Operation Days of Penitence
- Operation Enduring Freedom
- Organisation of Islamic Cooperation
- Oriental
- Orientalism
- Ortoqid
- Osama bin Laden
- Osama tapes
- Osiraq
- Osiris
- Ottoman Empire
- Ottoman Turkish language
- Ottoman Turks

== P ==
- P.B.U.H.
- Pahang
- Pahlavi
- Pahlavi dynasty
- Pak
- Pakistan
- Paktia Province
- Palestine Liberation Army
- Palestinian Arabic
- Palestinian National Covenant
- Palestinian people
- Pan Am Flight 103
- Pan-Arabism
- Panama Airline Bombing
- Partition of India
- Pashtun people
- Pattani kingdom
- Pattani separatism
- People of the Book
- PERF 558
- Persecution of Muslims
- Persia
- Persian Gulf
- Persian language
- Persian literature
- Pervez Musharraf
- Peter Arnett
- Phocas
- Pilgrimage
- Politics of Afghanistan
- Politics of Algeria
- Politics of Bahrain
- Politics of Bangladesh
- Politics of Iran
- Politics of Jordan
- Politics of Kuwait
- Politics of Morocco
- Politics of Oman
- Politics of Pakistan
- Politics of Saudi Arabia
- Politics of Syria
- Polygamy
- Prayer
- Predestination
- President of Afghanistan
- President of Iran
- President of Pakistan
- Prime Minister of Afghanistan
- Prime Minister of Bangladesh
- Prime Minister of Iran
- Prime Minister of Pakistan
- Princess Fawzia Fuad of Egypt
- Prophet
- Prophets
- Prophets of Islam
- Punjabi language
- Purdah
- Pushtu language

== Q ==
- Qaboos of Oman
- Qada
- Qadi
- Qahtaba ibn Shabib al-Ta'i
- Qaideen
- Qajar dynasty
- Qari
- Qari Ahmadullah
- Qatar
- Qibla
- Qiblah
- Qisas
- Qiyaamah
- Qiyaamat
- Qiyaas
- Qiyam
- Qiyamah
- Qiyamat
- Qiyas
- Qudah
- Qudama ibn Ja'far
- Queen of Sheba
- Quibla
- Qunut
- Qur'an
- Quraish
- Quran
- Quranism
- Quran and miracles
- Quraysh (sura)
- Qurbani
- Qusay Hussein
- Qutayba ibn Muslim

== R ==
- Ra'kat
- Rabia
- Rachel Corrie
- Radd al-Shams
- Rafah
- Rajab
- Rakaat
- Ramadaan
- Ramadan
- Ramadan Ali
- Ramadhan
- Ramallah
- Rashad Khalifa
- Rashid-al-Din Hamadani
- Rasool
- Rasul
- Rauf Denktaş
- Rawalpindi
- Recep Tayyip Erdoğan
- Reconquista
- Religious conversion
- Religious pluralism
- René Guénon
- Resurrection of Jesus
- Revelation
- Reza Pahlavi
- Riaz Ahmed Gohar Shahi
- Richard Francis Burton
- Richard Reid
- Richard Thompson
- Riots in Palestine of May, 1921
- Rise of the Ottoman Empire
- Riyadh
- Rohingya people
- Rohingya persecution in Myanmar
- Rubaiyat of Omar Khayyam
- Ruby Muhammad
- Ruhollah Khomeini
- Rukn
- Ruku'
- Rulers of Kel Ahaggar
- Rustamid

== S ==
- S.A.W.
- S.W.T.
- Sa'yee
- Saadi
- Saadia Gaon
- Sabians
- Sabr
- Sacred language
- Sacred text
- Sadaqah
- Saddam Hussein
- Saeb Erekat
- Saee
- Safa
- Safavids
- Saffarid dynasty
- Safiyya bint Huyayy
- Safsaf massacre
- Sahaba
- Sahabah
- Sahabi
- Sahifa-e-Kamila
- Sai Baba
- Saif ad-Din Ghazi I
- Saif al-Adel
- Saint
- Sajdah
- Salaam
- Salaat
- Saladin
- Salafi
- Salafi movement
- Salah
- Salam
- Salat ul Jum'a
- Salawat
- Sallallahu 'alaihi wa sallam
- Salman the Persian
- Salman Pak
- Salman Rushdie
- Samanid
- Samarkand
- Sanaá
- Sani Abacha
- Saniyasnain Khan
- Saqifah
- Sardar Mohammad Hashim Khan
- Sassanid dynasty
- Satan
- SATTS
- Saudi Arabia
- Saum
- Saviours' Day
- Sawm
- Sayed Qutb
- Sayyid
- Sayyid Abul Ala Maududi
- Sayyid Baraka
- Sayyid Qutb
- Sea of Galilee
- Seal of the Prophets
- Second Sudanese Civil War
- Seghatoleslam
- Sehri
- Selangor
- Seleucid Empire
- Seljuk Turks
- Semitic people
- Semitic languages
- Sephardi
- September 11, 2001 attacks
- Seyyed Hossein Nasr
- Sha'baan
- Shaabaan
- Shafi'i
- Shahada
- Shahadah
- Shaheed
- Shahid
- Shaikh
- Shaitan
- Shamil Basayev
- Shams
- Sharaf ad-Din Ali Yazdi
- Shargh
- Shari'ah
- Sharia
- Sharif of Mecca
- Shatt al-Arab
- Shaukat Aziz
- Shawwal
- Shayateen
- Shaytaan
- Sheba
- Sher Shah
- Shi'a
- Shi'a Islam
- Shia
- Shia Imam
- Shiite Islam
- Shirin Ebadi
- Shirk
- Shriners
- Shura
- Silsila
- Sindh
- Sira
- Sirah
- Sirwal
- Siwa Oasis
- Siwak
- Sokoto Grand Vizier
- Solomon
- Somali language
- Somalia
- Sphinx
- Star and crescent
- Sub'haanallah
- Subhanahu wa ta'ala
- Sudan
- Sufis
- Sufism
- Suhoor
- Suicide bombing
- Sujud
- Sukarno
- Sulayman ibn Hisham
- Sultan
- Sultan Ahmad Shah
- Sultanate of Rum
- Sunna
- Sunnah
- Sunnat
- Sunni Islam
- Sura
- Sura
- Surudi Milli
- Swahili language
- Syed Muhammad Naquib al-Attas
- Syedna Mohammed Burhanuddin
- Syria
- Syriac language

== T ==
- Ta'awwuz
- Tazia
- Ta'ziyeh
- Ta-Ha
- Tabari
- Tabarra
- Tabatabaei
- Tafseer
- Tafsir
- Taghut
- Tahajjud
- Taharat
- Tahir ibn Husayn
- Tahirid dynasty
- Taifa
- Taj Mahal
- Tajik language
- Tajweed
- Takbirah
- Takfir
- Talbiyah
- Taliban
- Taqdir
- Taqiyya
- Taqlid
- Taqwa
- Taraweeh
- Tarika
- Tariq ibn-Ziyad
- Tariq Ramadan
- Tarteel
- Tasbeeh
- Tatars
- Tauhid
- Tawaaf
- Tawaf
- Tawalla
- Tawbah
- Tawheed
- Tawhid
- Tayammum
- T. E. Lawrence
- Tehran
- Temple Mount
- Terengganu
- Thabit ibn Nasr
- Thabit ibn Qurra
- Terrorism
- The Satanic Verses
- The World Forum for Proximity of Islamic Schools of Thought
- Theistic evolution
- Theo van Gogh (film director)
- Throne Verse
- Timeline of Islam
- Timeline of Islamic history
- Timur
- Tipu Sultan
- Topkapı Palace
- Torah
- Transliteration
- Treaty with Tripoli (1796)
- Tulkarm
- Tunisia
- Turbah
- Turkic languages
- Turkish language
- Turkish literature
- Twelvers
- Tétouan

== U ==
- Uday Hussein
- Ulema
- Ulugh Beg
- Umar
- Umar al-Aqta
- Umar ibn al-Khattab
- Umayyad
- Umm al-mu'mineen
- Umm Kulthum
- Umm Kulthum (name)
- Umm walad
- Ummah
- United Arab Emirates
- United Nations Iraq-Kuwait Observation Mission
- United Republic
- United Submitters International
- Urdu language
- Urdu poetry
- Usamah ibn Munqidh
- Usman Dan Fodio
- Usule Din
- Usury
- Uthman
- Uthman ibn Affan
- Uyghur language
- Uzbek language
- Uzza

== V ==
- Vaikom Muhammad Basheer
- Varieties of Arabic
- Violence against Muslims in India
- Vilayat-e Faqih
- Virgin Mary: Islamic view

== W ==
- Wa 'alaikumus salam
- Wadi-us-Salaam
- wahdat al-wujud
- Wahhabism
- Wahi
- Wajib
- Wali
- Walima
- Wallace Fard Muhammad
- Waqf
- War in Afghanistan (2001–present)
- War on terrorism
- Wasil ibn Ata
- Wasim Sajjad
- Western Sahara
- Western Wall
- Why Islam?
- William Abdullah Quilliam
- William Muir
- Witr
- Wodoo
- Women in Islam
- Women in the Qur'an
- World Trade Center bombing
- Wudhu
- Wudu
- Wuzu

== X ==
- -

== Y ==
- Ya Allah
- Yahya Ayyash
- Yahya Jammeh
- Yahya Khan
- Yaqub
- Yasir Qadhi
- Yasser Arafat
- Yathrib
- Yazidi
- Year of the Elephant
- Yehuda Halevi
- Yemen
- Yemeni Arabic
- Yemenite Jews
- Yiddish language
- Young Turks
- Yousuf Karsh
- Yusuf
- Yusuf al-Qaradawi
- Yusuf Estes
- Yvonne Ridley

== Z ==
- Zacarias Moussaoui
- Zafarullah Khan Jamali
- Zahra Kazemi
- Zahiri
- Zaiddiyah
- Zakaat
- Zakah
- Zakat
- Zakir Naik
- Zalmay Khalilzad
- Zamzam Well
- Zaouia
- Zarqa
- Zayed bin Sultan Al Nahyan
- Zaynab bint Khuzayma
- Zendiq
- Zentani Muhammad az-Zentani
- Ziauddin Sardar
- Zikr
- Zikri
- Zi'l-Hijja
- Zi'l-Qa'da
- Ziyarat
- Zulfikar Ali Bhutto

== See also ==
- Glossary of Islam
- Outline of Islam
- Outline of religion#Islam topics
- List of Islamic terms in Arabic
- Category:Islam
