= International Islamic Unity Conference (Iran) =

Annual meeting between sects of Islam

International Islamic Unity Conference in Iran
- Genre: Religious/politic conference
- Location: Tehran
- Country: Islamic Republic of Iran
- Inaugurated: 1987
- Organizer: the World Forum for Proximity of Islamic Schools of Thought

The International Islamic Unity Conference is an international conference held every year during the Islamic Unity week in Tehran, Iran. It's organized by The World Forum for Proximity of Islamic Schools of Thought, and its main objective includes devising ways of unity for the Islamic world, and likewise, sympathy/consultation between scholars and scientists to approach their viewpoints in intended fields. The subjects of its meetings are determined based on divergent issues/problems of the Islamic world. The meeting involves the attendance of many scholars, religious thinkers and prominent figures from various countries.

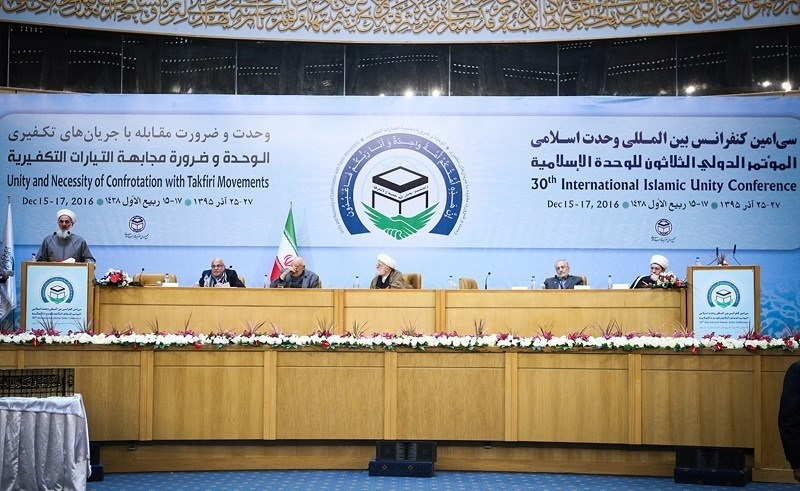

== Background ==
The First International Islamic Unity Conference was held in 1987 in Tehran, Iran. After holding the 4th Islamic unity conference which was organized by the Islamic Promotions Organization of Iran, then Ayatollah Ali Khamenei as the supreme leader of Iran ordered to establish "the World Forum for Proximity of Islamic Schools of Thought", since then, the conference is organized by the mentioned forum.

== Members/Guests ==
Many well-known figures from all over the world have taken part in the event. Participants include Islamic scholars, ministers of Islamic countries, clerics, intellectuals, representatives of scientific/cultural organizations and other significant individuals from different countries of the world. For instance, at the 29th Islamic Unity Conference there were over 600 prominent figures from Iran (as the host) and 70 countries from around the globe who participated in the meeting.

== The 30th conference ==
The 30th Islamic unity conference was opened by president Rouhani, under the banner of "Unity, Necessity of Countering Takfiri movements" in Tehran, on 15 December 2016 with participation of diverse participants from different countries, such as: China, Iraq, UK, Malaysia, Indonesia, Lebanon, Thailand, Australia, Russia and so on, including more than domestic and foreign guests, several scholars and likewise 220 famous figures from different countries of the world took part in the conference. Additionally, the 31st international Islamic unity conference was held on 4-6 Dec 2017 in Tehran.

== See also ==
- Outline of Islam
- Glossary of Islam
- Index of Islam-related articles
- International Conference on Supporting Palestine Intifada
