= Badar =

Badar may refer to:

- Badar (politician), governor of the Afghan province of Badghis
- Badar (surname), surname of Central Asian origin

== See also ==
- Bader
