= Shia view of Aisha =

Sectional view of a wife of Muhammad

The Shi'a views of Aisha are generally unfavourable. Her role in the Battle of the Camel is widely considered the most significant source of such contempt.

Some Shi'a also consider Aisha to be a controversial figure because of her political involvement. Aisha came from a political family lineage, as she was the daughter of Abu Bakr, the first caliph. Aisha also played an active role in Muhammad's political life; she was known to accompany him to wars, where she learned military skills, such as initiating pre-war negotiations between combatants, conducting battles, and ending wars.

== Wife of Muhammad ==
=== Status as favorite wife ===
Shias reject the idea that Aisha was Muhammad's favorite wife and believe that Muhammad favored none of his wives in compliance with the Qur'anic verse:

Marry women of your choice, Two or three or four; but if ye fear that ye shall not be able to deal justly (with them), then only one, or (a captive) that your right hands possess, that will be more suitable, to prevent you from doing injustice. (Surah an-Nisa', Ayat 3)

Others believe that Umm Salama was his favorite wife due to her dedication to the Ahl al-Bayt. Umm Salama is presented as a contrast to Aisha through her loyalty to Muhammad's family as well as obedience to his commands after his death. Unlike Aisha, who raised an army against Ali, Umm Salama tried to calm tensions. She also warned Ali of Aisha's intentions when dissuading Aisha from rebellion was unsuccessful.

It is generally accepted by Shias that Khadijah was Muhammad's favorite wife without contest, and that Aisha or Umm Salama were only the favorite of his later wives. Some use the fact that Muhammad was only in a monogamous relationship with Khadijah as evidence of her superiority to his later wives. One opinion is that Muhammad's marriage to Aisha was only prescribed to ease his suffering after Khadijah's death, diminishing the implications of divine intent for the union.

Muhammad's love and gratitude for Khadijah was so great that Aisha would become jealous. One time, Khadijah's sister Hala whose voice sounded exactly like Khadijah came to visit the Muhammad, as soon as he heard the familiar voice, he said "It must be Hala, her voice is just like that of Khadijah." At this, Aisha burst forth "How is it that you always think of that old woman who is no more living when Allah has given you much better wives." Mohammed replied, "Never better". On another occasion, he said: "Aisha! Khadijah's love was given to me by Allah; never did Allah give me a better wife than Khadijah."

=== Character ===
Shi'as uphold that Fatimah, Muhammad's daughter and wife of Ali ibn Abi Talib was the greatest woman while they also view her as infallible. Shia consider Fatima's ideal of the innocent and long-suffering as the counterpart to the political misdemeanors of which they accuse Aisha. Fatima is described as an exemplary wife, daughter, and mother and the only woman of the Fourteen Perfect of Pure Ones in Shia tradition. They cite the following hadith:

Ahmad ibn Hanbal records:

Anas narrated that the prophet (s) said: "The most excellent of the women of all worlds are: Maryam the daughter of al-Imran, Khadijah the daughter of Khuwaylid, Fatimah the daughter of Muhammad, and Asiyah the wife of Pharaoh"

Although Sunnis attribute thousands of hadith to Aisha, Shias do not consider her a reputable source of hadith. She is deemed an untrustworthy and unreliable source because of her partisanship. Instead, Fatima and Ali are considered the best sources of hadith and are included as authoritative sources by both Shias and Sunnis. However, Aisha is used in certain hadith to serve as an example of how proper women should not behave.

Her character is further questioned by an accusation that she secretly disliked Ali, as related in Maria Dakake's The Charismatic Community.

=== Jealousy ===
Some Shias believe that Aisha was jealous of Muhammad's other wives, especially his first wife, Khadijah. On one occasion she is reported to have been tired of Muhammad speaking of his first wife so often and said that Allah had replaced Khadijah with a better wife, referring to herself, for which Muhammad rebuked her. She is also criticized for deceiving Muhammad and hatching a plan with Hafsa bint Umar to stop him spending a long time at Zaynab bint Jahsh's house. They believe this shows a severe amount of disrespect and insubordination to her husband. The following verses of the Qur'an are unanimously agreed by scholars to be referring to Aisha and Hafsa:

When the Prophet confided unto one of his wives a matter, but when she divulged it (unto others) and God apprised him therefore, he made known a part of it and avoided a part; so when he informed her of it, said she: ‘Who informed thee of this?’ He said: ‘Informed, me, the All-Knowing, the All-Aware’. If you both (women) repent to Allah, (it is better for you), for your hearts have swerved from the right path and if you supported each other against the Prophet, you should know that Allah is his Protector, and after Him Gabriel and the righteous believers and the angels are his companions and helpers. Happily his Lord if he divorceth you, will give him in your place wives better than you, submissive, faithful, obedient, repentant, prayerful, observers of fast, widows and virgins. (Surah at-Tahrim, Ayat 3-5)

Another example of Aisha's jealousy is found in a story regarding Safiyyah, another of Muhammad's wives. Aisha is reported to have mocked Safiyyah's Jewish heritage, which invoked Muhammad's defense of Safiyyah. He reminded Aisha that while Safiyyah's people descended from prophets, Aisha's ancestors had no special status.

One hadith attributed to Ali, the fourth caliph, condemns jealousy in all women.

"Jealousy in women is unpardonable, but in a man it is a sign of his faith in religion."

Muhammad's wives held a higher place in society than other women according to verse 33:32 of the Qur'an

O ye wives of the Prophet! Ye are not like any other women. If ye keep your duty (to Allah), then be not soft of speech, lest he in whose heart is a disease aspire (to you), but utter customary speech.

and so were more accountable for their faults like jealousy.

== Relationship with Ali ==
The negative Shi'a view of Aisha largely stems from Aisha's short-lived dispute with Ali, which culminated in the Battle of the Camel before both sides reconciled. The Ahl al-bayt is defined by Shi'as as Muhammad, his daughter Fatima, her husband Ali, and their two sons Hasan and Husayn. They do not include Muhammad's wives in this category.

Aisha's apparent feelings towards Ali developed when she was accused of adultery. Muhammad took Aisha on a campaign against a Bedouin tribe. Aisha noticed she lost her necklace during a caravan rest stop and retraced her steps to find the piece of jewelry. When she returned, Aisha realized she was mistakenly left behind. Aisha returned to Medina escorted on a camel by a young man, Safwan Ibn Muattal, which quickly led to gossip and speculation. Muhammad was deeply affected by this occurrence and turned to others for advice. The strongest opinion came from Muhammad's cousin Ali who said, “There are women enough, you could make another her successor” and he suggested that Muhammad divorce Aisha. Aisha never forgot about Ali's statement, which sparked the apparent hatred towards Ali that continued when he tried to become Muhammad's successor. Although Sunnis believe that Allah revealed Aisha's innocence in the following verse

Lo! they who spread the slander are a gang among you. Deem it not a bad thing for you; nay, it is good for you. Unto every man of them (will be paid) that which he hath earned of the sin; and as for him among them who had the greater share therein, his will be an awful doom.

Some Shias believe that this verse was about Maryam the Copt instead of Aisha, and so in their eyes the charge against her has never been cleared. However, others agree with the Sunni view that this verse proves her innocent. Moreover the prophet Muhammad would have divorced her if these accusations were true. As he was receiving revelation from Allah.

Shi'a supported the advancement of Ali in the political world and disregarded Aisha because of her feelings towards Ali. The Shi'a preferred Ali over the first three caliphs; they never accepted Mu’awiya or any later caliphs, and Shi'a took the name shi’at Ali, or Ali's Party. Shi'a also regarded Ali to be the most judicious of the Companions. The early Shi'a deemed Ali and his descendants to have rights to leadership based on their relationship to Muhammad, their designation by Muhammad as his successors, along with their knowledge and religious insight.

== Role in Fitnah ==
=== Overview ===
The biggest criticism that the Shi'a have of Aisha was her role in the First Fitnah (First Islamic civil war). The Shi'a view her (and all) opposition to Ali's Khalifat as a sinful act.

=== Uthman's death ===
Aisha was a key player in the rebellion against 'Uthman ibn 'Affan, the third Khalifah. They quote her naming 'Uthman a nathal who should be killed, from numerous sources. They claim her motive was to install her inlaw, Talhah ibn Ubaydullah, as 'Uthman's successor. They also believe that only when the people turned to 'Ali ibn Abi Talib to become the Khalifah did Aisha change her stance and fight 'Ali to demand Qisas for Uthman. They cite some Sahabah and Tabi'in who highlighted her sudden shift in policy:

"Ubayd bin Abi Salma who was a maternal relative of Aisha met her as she was making her way to Madinah. Ubayd said "Uthman has been killed and the people were without an Imam for eight days" to which Aisha asked "What did they do next?". Ubayd said "The people approached '‘Ali and gave him bayya". Aisha then said 'Take me back! Take me back to Makkah". She then turned her face towards Makkah and said, 'Verily Uthman was murdered innocently, and By Allah, I shall avenge his blood'. Ubayd then said 'You are now calling Uthman innocent, even though it was you who said 'Kill Nathal, this Jew".

=== Battle of the Camel ===
The Shi'a frown upon her role in the Battle of the Camel. The Battle of the Camel took place in Basra on December 4, 656 CE. This battle is regarded as the first time Muslims, particularly Muslims who ranked among Muhammad's sahaba, clashed and fought against one another in open warfare. The Battle of the Camel has been considered to be the first fitna and is also referred to as a “rebellion that leads to schism”, “violent factional strife”, or even “the temptation to turn upon one's fellow Muslims”. The name of the battle reflects the centrality of Aisha's role in the conflict, as she was seated on her camel in the middle of the battlefield. Aisha led a force of 13,000 soldiers against Ali after he failed to punish the murder of ‘Uthman in her view. During the Battle of the Camel, Aisha mobilized military opposition with two male allies, Zubayr ibn al-Awwam and Talhah, in order to challenge the legitimacy of ‘Ali. ‘Alis forces defeated their opponents; Talhah and Zubayr ibn al-Awwam were killed, and Aisha was sent home.

Shi'a find this battle to be controversial because they believe that she launched her army on Ali out of her personal hatred towards him and his family. They use the following narration in their argument:

“Aisha was informed about the opinion of the women, but there was some thing inside her boiling like a cooking pot against Ali”

The Shi'a also usually refer to the Qur'anic verse:

O wives of the Prophet! you are not like any other of the women; If you will be on your guard, then be not soft in (your) speech, lest he in whose heart is a disease yearn; and speak a good word. And stay in your houses and do not display your finery like the displaying of the ignorance of yore; and keep up prayer, and pay the poor-rate, and obey Allah and His Messenger. Allah only desires to keep away the uncleanness from you, O people of the House! and to purify you a (thorough) purifying. (Surah al-Ahzab, Ayat 32-33)

They state that the verse clearly instructs Muhammad's wives to stay in their homes. They say that Aisha's role in the battle clearly transgresses Allah's commandment. The Shi'a also quote 'Ali ibn Abi Talib to back up their stance on this verse:

'He ('Ali) said: ‘Go to that woman and tell her to return to her home wherein Allah had ordered her to remain’. He (Ibn Abbas) said: ‘I therefore went to her and asked permission to enter, but she didn't grant it. I therefore entered the house without her permission and sat on a cushion. She (Aisha) said: ‘O Ibn Abbas, by Allah I have never witnessed anyone like you! You entered our house without permission and sat on our cushion without our permission’. I said: ‘By Allah this is not your house, your only house is the one wherein Allah ordered you to remain, but you didn't obey. The Commander of the Faithful orders you to return to that homeland from which you had left.'

They also quote Shaykh Sibt Jauzi al-Hanafi, Shaykh Ibn Talha Shafiyi and Ibn Sabagh Maliki. Who all record that prior to the battle of Jamal:

"He Ali wrote a letter to Aisha: 'By leaving your home you have disobeyed Allah(swt) and his Rasul(messenger)"

They reject Aisha's reason for the battle that she was demanding Qisas for 'Uthman ibn 'Affan. They don't believe that it was her place to demand Qisas and assert that only the Imam(Head of State) can implement Shari'ah (including Qisas).

== See also ==
- Fatwa of Ali Khamenei against insulting revered Sunni figures
