= Mazi =

Mazi may refer to:

- Mazı Underground City
- Suzhou numerals
- GOC Army Headquarters
- Mazi (Islam), a term in Islamic jurisprudence
- Mazi Melesa Pilip, Ethiopian-born American politician
- Mazi Smith (born 2001), American football player

== See also ==
- Mazie (disambiguation)
- Maazii, a 2013 Indian film by Jaideep Chopra
