= Seyyed Mohammad Bagher Borghei Modarres =

Iranian linguist, critic and religious scholar

- Born: July 2, 1986 (age 40); Tehran, Iran
- Occupations: Linguist, Translator, University professor
- Known for: Authorship, Translation

Seyyed Mohammad Bagher Borghei Modarres; July 2, 1986 is an Iranian linguist, critic, cineast and religious scholar.

== Early life ==
Modarres was born in Tehran, Iran in 1986. He spent his childhood in Dubai, United Arab Emirates. At the beginning of his primary school years they moved to Qom. Before the end of primary school, he won third place in the National Scientific Olympiad in Iran, and after that he passed the entrance examination for the school of special talented students under the supervision of the National Organization for Development of Exceptional Talents.

== Education and career ==
He got his bachelor's degree in English language and literature and master's degree in linguistics and continued his studies in the field of linguistics, earning his doctorate. While at university, he participated in dramaturgy and theatre direction courses and learned filmmaking and acting in short movies. He has written some plays for other directors. He started to lecture in universities in 2010.

Several translations, compilations and writings of his have been published in the fields of language, linguistics, semiotics, translation, and religious and Qur'anic studies in different languages. His most recent publication was a translation of the book Stylistics, A Practical Coursebook in Elmi Farhangi Publication. Most of his studies have focused on English, Arabic and Persian. As of April 2018, he was a faculty member in the language, linguistics and translation department in the Research Center for Proximity Studies, and he is the vice editor in chief and managing editor of the journals Quran and Linguistic Studies under the supervision of University of Science and education of the Quran and Risalatut Taqrib under the supervision of the World Assembly for Approximation of Islamic Schools of thought. He is now the educational deputy of Allameh Askari International University and also he is the director of online language courses at London Islamic College.

== Works ==
=== Articles ===
- Analysis of Information Structure in English Translation of the Holy Quran/ (Journal of Quran and Linguistic Studies)
- Translation of the Holy Quran from the Perspective of Word Order, Discourse Analysis and Information Structure (Journal of Interdisciplinary Translation Studies)
- Analysis of Translation of Quranic Metaphors into English (Journal of Quran and Linguistic Studies)
- Stylistic Characteristics of the Holy Quran (Specialized Journal of Literature and Art, Afarineh)
- Translation of Quranic metaphors (Specialized Journal of Literature and Art, Afarineh)
- Semiotic Analysis of film: A case study of the Movie "Rosvaei" (Specialized Journal of Literature and Art, Afarineh)
- Izutsu's Quranic Semantics (Specialized Journal of Literature and Art, Afarineh)
- Psychological and Spiritual Effects of Intimacy with the Holy Quran, 28th International Competition of the Holy Quran, Tehran, 2011.
- Analysis of theme-rheme arrangement in English Translation of the holy Quran, The first International Conference of Interdisciplinary Studies of Translation, Mashhad, Iran, 2013.
- Reviewing Job Titles in the Original Text and Translation of "Karname-ye Ardashir-e Babakan"
- Book Review: Persian by Shahrzad Mahootian.
- Reinterpretation of Meaning-Based Theory of Translation Based on the Different Functions of Language in Different Types of texts, 2008.
- Research Methods in Discourse Analysis.

=== Books ===
==== As author ====
- Linguistics and Advertisement, Armaghan publications.
- Linguistics and Brand, Armaghan publications.
- General English, Armaghan publications.
- Talk to Learn English (1, 2, 3), Armaghan publications.

==== As translator ====
- Authenticity of Nahj al-Balaghah, Institute of Islamic Studies, Canada.
- Meaning-Based Translation, Armaghan publications.
- Stylistics: A Practical Coursebook, Laura Wright and Jonathan Hope, Elmi Farhangi publications.
- Get a Name!, Jacky Tai, Armaghan publications.
- Describing Discourse, Nicholas Wood, Nevise-ye Parsi Publications
