= World Assembly of Islamic Awakening =

- Formation: 2011
- Founder: Islamic Republic of Iran
- Legal status: Active
- Purpose: To ensure the continuity/development of the "Islamic Awakening Movement" by increasing communication, interaction and transfer of experiences
- Location: Tehran, Iran
- Fields: Islamic (and political) fields
- Members: International; 40 members
- Official language: Persian, Arabic, English
- Leader: Ali Akbar Velayati

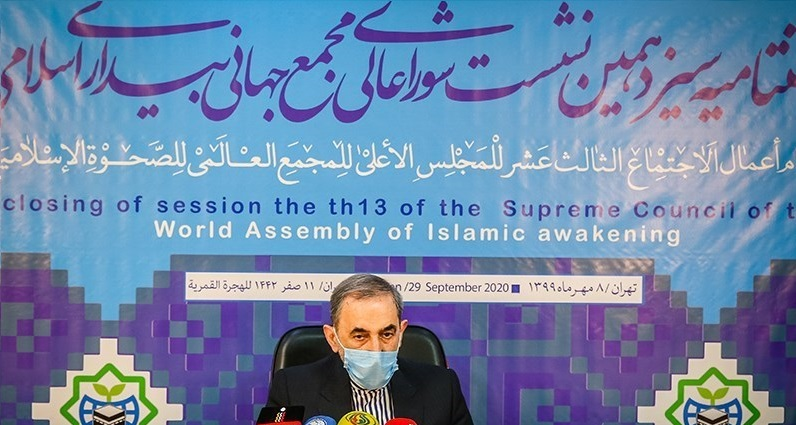
The session of the supreme-council of the "World Assembly of Islamic Awakening"; by the lecture of Velayati the secretary-general of the Assembly

World Assembly of Islamic Awakening (Persian: مجمع جهانی بیداری اسلامی) is an Islamic assembly founded in 2011 to ensure continuous communication and development of "Islamic Awakening Movement". The secretariat of the assembly is located in Tehran, Iran. The senior adviser to the Supreme Leader (of Iran) in international affairs, Ali Akbar Velayati, is the secretary-general of the convention(s).

The World Assembly of Islamic Awakening comprises 40 members, and was established simultaneously with the wave of Islamic movement in Tehran; with the goal of "preventing regional developments from deviating from their path" and "unity of the Islamic Ummah and rapprochement between religions", in addition to "transparency/information/confrontation with anti-Islamic currents" that seek to challenge the Islamic awakening.

== See also ==
- The World Forum for Proximity of Islamic Schools of Thought
- Islamic Culture and Communication Organization
- Ahl Al-Bayt World Assembly
