= Religion in Chad =

Religion in Chad (2009 census)
1. Islam (58.4%)
2. Christianity (34.7%)
3. Traditional faiths (4.00%)
4. None (2.40%)
5. Other (0.50%)

Islam and Christianity are the most widely professed religions in Chad. A smaller share of Chadians adhere to other faiths, including traditional religions, or profess no religion.

Chadian Muslims represent the majority of the population; according to a 2010 Pew Research Center survey, 53% professed to be Sunni, 23% non-denominational and 4% Ahmadi. They are largely concentrated in the northern, eastern, and central regions, whereas traditional religions or animists and Christians live primarily in southern Chad and Guéra. Islam was brought in the course of the Muslim conquest of the Sudan region, in the case of Chad completed in the 11th century with the conversion of the Kanem–Bornu Empire.

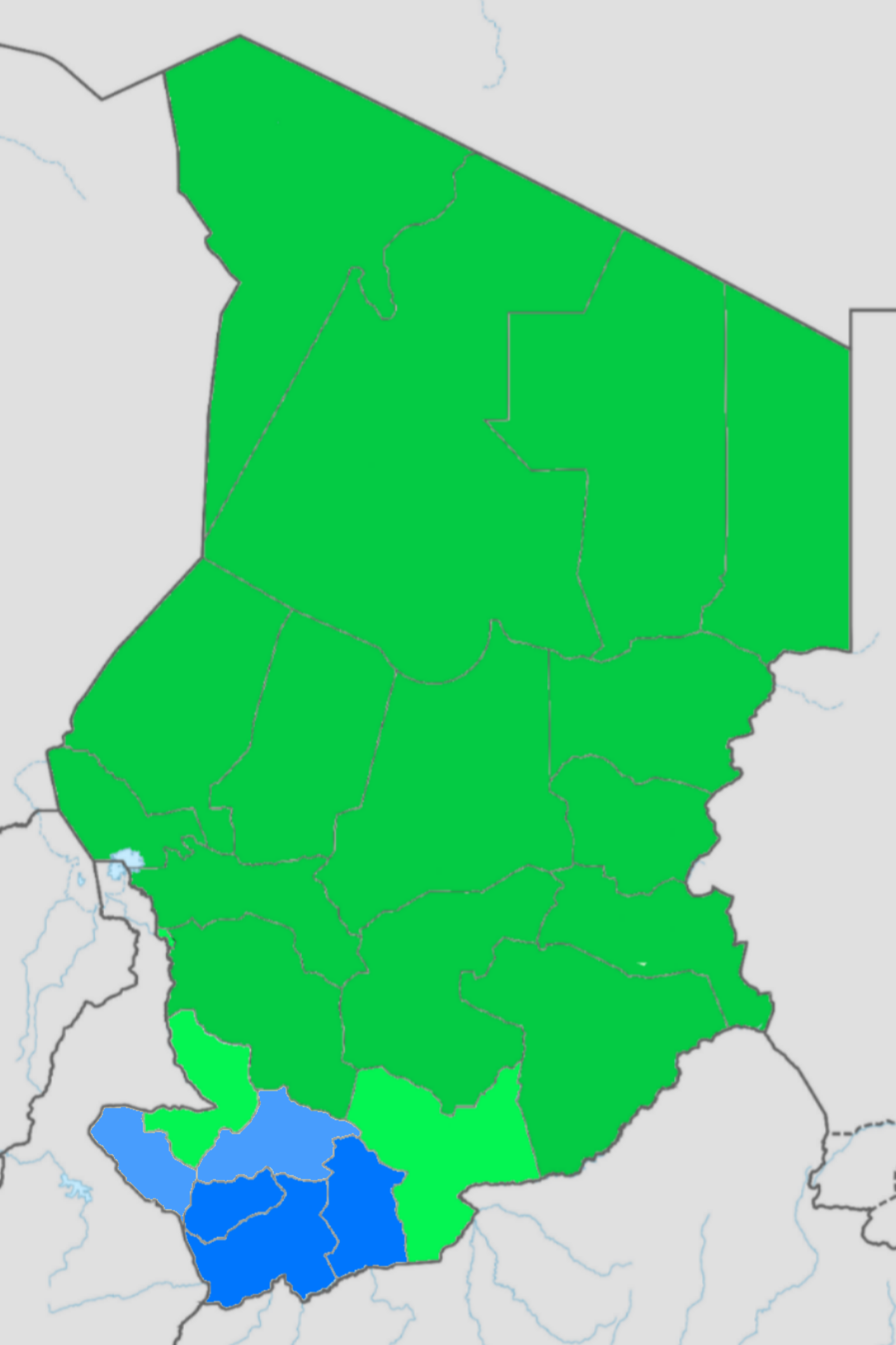
Religions in Chad by region; Islam (green: mostly, light green: plurality), Christianity and traditional religions (blue: mostly, light blue: plurality).

Christianity arrived in Chad with the French, at the end of the 19th century. Among Chadian Christians, 22.8% profess to be Catholic and 17.9% profess to be Protestant.

== Demographics ==
=== Censuses ===
The share of Muslims in Chad increased from 53.9% to 58.4% of the total population between the 1993 and 2009 general population and housing censuses. Conversely, adherents of traditional religions declined both in absolute numbers and proportionally, falling from 7.4% to 4.0% of the total population in the same time period. Both censuses recorded Catholicism as the single largest Christian denomination in Chad, though the 2009 census saw an increase in the share of Protestants from 14.4% to 16.1% of the entire population.

Religious affiliation by census year
Religion	1964		1993		2009	
Religion	#	%	#	%	#	%
Muslim	1,035,450	41.0	3,335,869	53.9	6,392,040	58.4
Christian	736,340	29.2	2,151,996	34.7	3,787,668	34.7
—Catholic	494,970	19.6	1,260,512	20.3	2,026,152	18.6
—Protestant	241,370	9.6	891,484	14.4	1,761,516	16.1
Traditional	741,930	29.4	456,064	7.4	438,831	4.0
No religion	—N/a	—N/a	193,109	3.1	266,486	2.4
Other	10,650	0.4	33,442	0.5	56,657	0.5
Undetermined	—N/a	—N/a	23,058	0.4	—N/a	—N/a
Total	2,524,370	100	6,193,538	100	10,941,682	100

=== Other estimates ===
Religious affiliation in Chad
	Muslim	Christian				Animist	Other	Unknown	None
	Muslim	All	Catholic	Protestant	Other Christians	Animist	Other	Unknown	None
1996-97 DHS Survey (Note: The DHS Surveys of 1996-97 and 2004 sampled women ages 15-49 and men ages 15-59.)	54.6%	38.9%	22.6%	16.3%	-	2.9%	3.5%		
2004 DHS Survey	55.7%	40.0%	22.4%	17.6%	-	4.3%			
2010 Malaria Survey (Note: The 2010 Malaria Survey only sampled women ages 15-49.)	53.6%	43.0%	-		-	3.4%			
2010 Pew Forum Estimates	55.7%	40.0%	22.5%	17.6%	-	-	-	-	-
2014-15 DHS Survey (Note: The DHS Survey of 2014-15 sampled women and men ages 15-49.)	52.1%	44.1%	20%	23.9%	0.2%	0.3%	-	0.7%	2.8%
2020 Pew Research Center Projections	55.1%	41.1%	-	-	-	1.3%	0.1%		2.4%
2020 The ARDA Estimate	56.3%	35.2%	15.6%	7.8%	11.8%	7.6%	0.8%	-	0.1%
2021 ACN International Estimate	57.5%	34.8%	-	-	-	6.7%	1%		

== Traditional religions ==
Ancestors play an important role in Chadian classical religions. They are thought to span the gap between the supernatural and natural worlds. They connect these two worlds specifically by linking living lineage members with their earliest forebears. Because of their proximity, and because they once walked among the living, ancestors are prone to intervene in daily affairs. This intervention is particularly likely in the case of the recently deceased, who are thought to spend weeks or months in limbo between the living and the dead. Many religious observances include special rituals to propitiate these spirits, encourage them to take their leave with serenity, and restore the social order their deaths have disrupted.

Spirits are also numerous. These invisible beings inhabit a parallel world and sometimes reside in particular places or are associated with particular natural phenomena. Among the Mbaye, a Sara subgroup, water and lightning spirits are thought to bring violent death and influence other spirits to intervene in daily life. The sun spirit, capable of rendering service or causing harm, also must be propitiated. Spirits may live in family groups with spouses and children. They are also capable of taking human, animal, or plant forms when they appear among the living. The supernatural powers that control natural events are also of major concern. Among farming peoples, rituals to propitiate such powers are associated with the beginning and end of the agricultural cycle. Among the Sara, the new year begins with the appearance of the first new moon following the harvest. The next day, people hunt with nets and fire, offering the catch to ancestors. Libations are offered to ancestors, and the first meal from the new harvest is consumed.

Among the more centralized societies of Chad, the ruler frequently is associated with divine power. Poised at the apex of society, he or (more rarely) she is responsible for good relations with the supernatural forces that sanction and maintain the social order. For example, among the Moundang, the gon lere of Léré is responsible for relations with the sky spirits. And among the Sara Madjingay, the mbang (chief) of the village of Bédaya controls religious rituals that preserve and renew the social order. Even after the coming of Islam, the symbols of such authority reinforced the rulers of nominally Islamic states such as Wadai, Kanem-Borno, and Bagirmi.

Finally, most classical African religions involve belief in a supreme being who created the world and its inhabitants but who then retired from active intervention in human affairs. As a result, shrines to a high god are uncommon, and people tend to appeal to the lesser spirits; yet the notion of a supreme being may have helped the spread of Christianity. When missionaries arrived in southern Chad, they often used the local name of this high god to refer to the Christian supreme being. Thus, although a much more interventionist spirit, the Christian god was recognizable to the people. This recognition probably facilitated conversion, but it may also have ironically encouraged syncretism (the mixing of religious traditions), a practice disturbing to many missionaries and to Protestants in particular. Followers of classical African religions would probably not perceive any necessary contradiction between accepting the Christian god and continuing to believe in the spirits just described.

Because order is thought to be the natural, desirable state, disorder is not happenstance. Classical African religions devote considerable energy to the maintenance of order and the determination of who or what is responsible for disorder. In the case of illness, for example, it is of the greatest importance to ascertain which spirit or which person is responsible for undermining the natural order; only then is it possible to prescribe a remedy. In such circumstances, people frequently take their cases to ritual specialists, who divine the threats to harmony and recommend appropriate action. Such specialists share their knowledge only with peers. Indeed, they themselves have probably acquired such knowledge incrementally as they made their way through elaborate apprenticeships.

Although classical African religions provide institutionalized ways of maintaining or restoring community solidarity, they also allow individuals to influence the cosmic order to advance their own interests. Magic and sorcery both serve this end. From society's standpoint, magic is positive or neutral. On the one hand, magicians try to influence life forces to alter the physical world, perhaps to bring good fortune or a return to health. Sorcerers, on the other hand, are antisocial, using sorcery (or "black magic") to control or consume the vital force of others. Unlike magicians, whose identity is generally known, sorcerers hide their supernatural powers, practicing their nefarious rites in secret. When misfortune occurs, people often suspect that sorcery is at the root of their troubles. They seek counsel from diviners or magicians to identify the responsible party and ways to rectify the situation; if the disruption is deemed to threaten everyone, leaders may act on behalf of the community at large. If discovered, sorcerers are punished.

The survival of any society requires that knowledge be passed from one generation to another. In many Chadian societies, this transmission is marked by ritual. Knowledge of the world and its forces is limited to adults; among the predominantly patrilineal societies of Chad, it is further limited to men in particular. Rituals often mark the transition from childhood to adulthood. However, they actively "transform" children into adults, teaching them what adults must know to assume societal responsibilities.

Although such rites differ among societies, the Sara yondo may serve as a model of male initiation ceremonies found in Chad. The yondo takes place at a limited number of sites every six or seven years. Boys from different villages, usually accompanied by an elder, gather for the rites, which, before the advent of Western education with its nine-month academic calendar, lasted several months. In recent decades, the yondo has been limited to several weeks between academic years.

The yondo and its counterparts among other Chadian societies reinforce male bonds and male authority. Women are not allowed to witness the rite. Their initiated sons and brothers no longer eat with them and go to live in separate houses. Although rites also mark the transition to womanhood in many Chadian societies, such ceremonies are much shorter. Rather than encouraging girls to participate in the larger society, they stress household responsibilities and deference to male authority.

== Islam ==
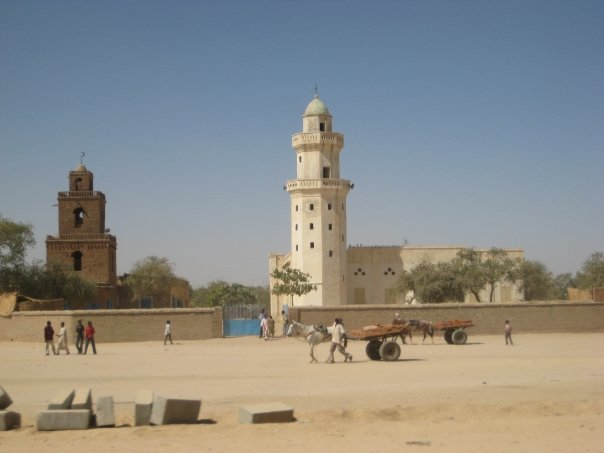
A mosque in Abéché, Chad

Islam became a dynamic political and military force in the Middle East in the decades immediately following Muhammad's death. By the late seventh century AD, Muslims reached North Africa and moved south into the desert. Although it is difficult to date the arrival and spread of Islam in Chad, by the time Arab migrants began arriving from the east in the fourteenth century, the faith was already widespread. Instead of being the product of conquest or the imposition of political power, Islam gradually spread in Chad, and beyond its political frontiers.

Islam in Chad has adapted to its local context in many ways. For one thing, despite the presence of a large number of Chadian Arabs and despite being an official language and widely spoken, Arabic is not the mother tongue of the majority of Chadian Muslims. As a result, although many Chadian Muslims have attended Qur'anic schools, in Chad there are only 2 brotherhoods, moreover Islam in Chad was not particularly influenced by the great mystical movements of the Islamic Middle Ages or the fundamentalist upheavals that affected the faith in the Middle East, West Africa, and Sudan. Beginning in the Middle East in the thirteenth century, Muslim mystics and da'is sought to complement the intellectual comprehension of Islam with direct religious experience through prayer, contemplation, and action. The followers of these da'is founded brotherhoods, which institutionalized their teachers' interpretations of the faith. Such organizations stimulated the spread of Islam and provided opportunities for joint action, for the most part, which was not the case in Chad, where only two brotherhoods exist. Perhaps as a result of prolonged contact with West African Muslim traders and pilgrims, most Chadian Muslims identify with the Tijaniyyah order, but the brotherhood has not served as a rallying point for unified action. Similarly, the Sanusiyya, a brotherhood founded in Libya in the mid-nineteenth century, enjoyed substantial economic and political influence in the Lake Chad Basin around 1900. Despite French fears of an Islamic revival movement led by "Sanusi fanatics," Chadian adherents, limited to the Awlad Sulayman Arabs and the Toubou of eastern Tibesti, have never been numerous.

Chapelle writes that even though Chadian Islam adheres to the Maliki legal school (which, like the other three accepted schools of Islamic jurisprudence, is based on an extensive legal literature), most Islamic education relies solely on the Qur'an. Higher Islamic education in Chad is there as there are hafiz school; thus, serious Islamic students and scholars must go abroad. Popular destinations include Khartoum and Cairo, where numerous Chadians attend Al Azhar, the most renowned university in the Islamic world.

Chadian observance of the five pillars of the faith differs somewhat from the orthodox tradition. For example, public and communal prayer occurs more often than the prescribed one time each week but often does not take place in a mosque. Moreover, Chadian Muslims probably make the pilgrimage less often than, for example, their Hausa counterparts in northern Nigeria. As for the Ramadan fast, the most fervent Muslims in Chad refuse to swallow their saliva during the day, a particularly stern interpretation of the injunction against eating or drinking between sunrise and sunset.

== Christianity ==
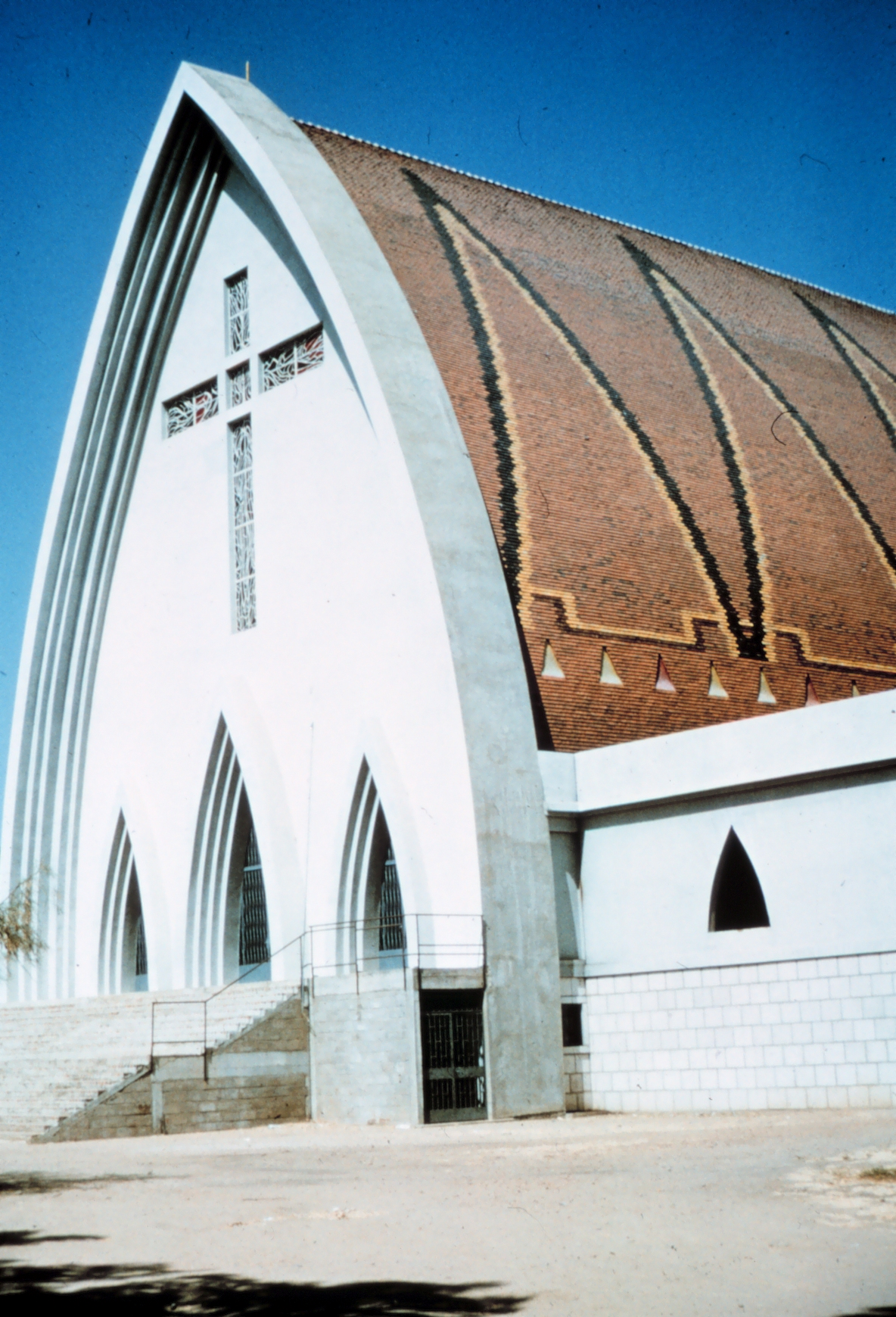
Church in Fort Lamy

Christianity arrived in Chad in the twentieth century, shortly after the colonial conquest. Contrary to the dominant pattern in some other parts of Africa, however, where the colonial powers encouraged the spread of the faith, the earliest French officials in Chad advised against it. This recommendation, however, probably reflected European paternalism and favoritism toward Islam rather than a display of liberalism. In any case, the French military administration followed such counsel for the first two decades of the century, the time it took to conquer the new colony and establish control over its people. Following World War I, official opposition to Christianity softened, and the government tolerated but did not sponsor missionaries.

Since World War II, Chadian Catholic Christians have had a far greater influence on Chadian life than their limited numbers suggest. The missions spread the ideology of Westernization—the notion that progress depended on following European models of development. Even more specifically, Roman Catholic mission education spread the French language. Even though Islam is the religion of the majority, Christians controlled the government that inherited power from the French. These leaders imparted an ideological orientation that continued to dominate in the 1980s. In addition, there are 7,000 Orthodox Christians.

== Baháʼí Faith ==
Though the history of the Baháʼí Faith in Chad began after the country's independence in 1960, members of the religion were present in associated territories since 1953. The Baháʼís of Chad elected their first National Spiritual Assembly in 1971. Through succeeding decades Baháʼís have been active in a number of ways and by some counts and estimates have become the third largest international religion in Chad with over 80,000 members by 2000.

== Freedom of religion ==
The Transitional Charter of October 2022 established Chad as a secular state and affirmed the separation of religion and state; it also provided for freedom of religion.

In 2026, the country was scored 1 out of 4 for religious freedom.
