= Muhammed Sharif =

Muhammed Sharif or Mohamed Sherif is the name of:

- Muhammad Sharif (1919–2008), Pakistani industrialist and father of Prime Minister Nawaz Sharif
- Muhammad Shariff (1921–1999), former Chairman Joint Chiefs of Staff Committee (CJCSC) of Military of Pakistan
- Mohammad Shariff (born 1920), former Chief of Naval Staff of Pakistan Navy and CJCSC of Pakistani military
- Mohammad Sharif (cricketer) (born 1985), Bangladeshi cricketer
- Mohammed Sharif, social worker from Uttar Pradesh, India
- Mohammed Sharif (detainee), Afghan citizen in extrajudicial detention at Guantanamo Bay Naval Base
- Mohammad Sharif (United Nations) (born 1933), former head of the centre for Social Development and Humanitarian Affairs at the United Nations
- Muhammad Sharif (cosmologist) (born 1962), Pakistani physicist
- Mohammad Sharif Ibrahim, 15th commander of the Royal Brunei Air Force (RBAirF)
- Muhammad Sharif Pasha al-Kabir (died 1865), Egyptian statesman
- Mohamed Sherif (born 1993), Egyptian footballer
- Mohamed Sherif (born 1996), Egyptian footballer
- Mohamed Sherif Pasha (1826–1887), Egyptian statesman and Prime Minister of Egypt
- Muhammad Shariff (general), Pakistani general
- Mian Muhammad Sharif, Pakistani businessman
- Mohamed Sharif, Somali footballer
