= Rafida =

Sunni polemical term to refer to Shiites

Rafida (Arabic: رافضة, romanized: Rāfiḍa, lit. 'rejectors') is a polemical term referring to Shia Muslims. It derives from Shia Muslims' rejection of the legitimacy of Abu Bakr (r. 632–634), Umar (r. 634–644), and Uthman (r. 644–656) as caliphs, in favor of an Imamate beginning with Ali ibn Abi Talib (r. 656–661), the cousin and son-in-law of the Islamic prophet Muhammad.

In particular, the term Rafida appears in Sunni polemics as a derogatory term for Twelvers, who constitute the majority of the Shia community. In turn, Twelvers have reappropriated this term favorably to signify their rejection of tyranny and their struggle against perceived Sunni oppression.

The term Rawafidh has also been used.

== Definition ==
The term Rafida (or Rawafid, lit. 'rejectors', sing. Rafidi) refers to those Shia Muslims who 'reject' the legitimacy of the caliphates of Abu Bakr (r. 632–634), Umar (r. 634–644), and Uthman (r. 644–656). One after another, these caliphs succeeded the Islamic prophet Muhammad after he died in 632 CE. In particular, the term Rafida is applied to Twelvers, who constitute the vast majority of Shias. Twelvers believe that, shortly before he died, Muhammad publicly designated his cousin and son-in-law, Ali ibn Abi Talib, as his successor at the Ghadir Khumm. In their view, early caliphs thus usurped Ali's right to succeed Muhammad. They also believe that Ali was succeeded by eleven of his descendants.

Rooted in early Islamic history, the term Rafida appears in Sunni polemics as a derogatory nickname for Twelvers, who have, in turn, reinterpreted this term favorably to signify 'rejection' of all tyranny and their struggle against perceived Sunni oppression. Less commonly, the term Rafida has been applied to other Shia sects, such as the ghulat (lit. 'exaggerators' or 'extremists'), who ascribed divinity to Shia imams and were excommunicated by them.

== Context ==
By eleventh century, the Shia status as "rejectors of the Truth" was canonized by Hanbali scholars, who did not grant Islamic rights to Shia Muslims: They were not to be married with, meat slaughtered by them was not halal (permissible), and they could not lead prayers. With the fall of Abbasids in 1258, such attacks on Shi'ism intensified. They are labeled today as infidels or heretics by various Salafi and Wahhabi scholars, considered a bigger threat to Islam than Christianity and Judaism, and there are frequent calls for their extermination. On these grounds, some Sunni Jihadist groups have justified their acts of violence against the Shia community. A popular reference for these groups is the prominent Hanbali theologian Ibn Taymiyya (d. 1328), a staunch anti-Shia who also accused the Shia of conspiring with nonbelievers to destroy Islam from within. In Saudi Arabia, where Wahhabism is present, schoolbooks referred to Shias as the Rafida until 1993. They were still openly denounced in Saudi schoolbooks and state-sponsored media as late as 2000s.

Once Shias realized that they could not rid themselves of the pejorative nickname, they sought to reappropriate it. Thus, the term Rafida in Twelver sources became an honorific title. In the contemporary era, some Shias in Iraq and Lebanon view the term as a source of pride, symbolizing revolt against tyranny.

== History ==
=== Origins ===
Origins of the term Rafida is uncertain. Perhaps the term is linked with the desertion of the Shia rebel Zayd ibn Ali (d. 740 CE) by some Kufan Shias, after the former refused to denounce the first two caliphs. They thus 'rejected' Zayd and became known as the Rafida. Zayd's rebellion was subsequently suppressed by the Umayyads and he was killed. Rather than the rejection of Zayd, more likely the term Rafida historically signified the rejection of the first three caliphs by Imamites, the forerunners of Twelvers.

Over time, the term Rafida became a popular pejorative for Twelvers. For Sunnis, the term signified the rejection of the first three caliphs, whom Twelvers count among infidels for —according to the Twelver view— usurping Ali ibn Abi Talib's right to succeed Muhammad. For Zaydis, who follow Zayd's teachings, the term denoted the rejection of Zayd by early Imamites.

=== Rafida in Sunni tradition ===
Early in the Islamic history, the term Rafida became a popular pejorative nickname for Imamites which, for Sunnis, signified the Imamites' rejection of the first three caliphs. The term Rafida also appears in some Sunni traditions of dubious authenticity. In one such tradition, Muhammad predicts the emergence of a group that would reject (yarfuduna) Islam. In another one, he orders Ali ibn Abi Talib to kill the Rafida for they are polytheists. Elsewhere, the Rafida, who are allegedly similar to Jews, are blamed for introducing into Islam the concept of anthropomorphism (tashbih), which is allegedly a hallmark of Judaism.

=== Rafida in Twelver tradition ===
Even though the term Rafida was initially intended as a derogatory nickname, there are Twelver traditions, attributed to Shia Imams, that reinterpret this term favorably. In one such tradition, Rafida are identified as a small group among the people of Pharaoh who rejected his rule, undaunted by his threats of punishment. This tradition is a reference to verses 7:120–126 and 20:70–75 of the Quran. According to some Twelver traditions, the term Rafida appeared also in the Tawrat.

=== Rafida in Zaydi tradition ===
In some Zaydi sources, the term Rafida refers to those Kufans who deserted Zayd because he did not condemn the first two caliphs. Even though Zayd likely viewed Ali as the best amongst the companions of the Islamic prophet and the most qualified to succeed him, he also regarded the caliphates of Abu Bakr and Umar as permissible. The preponderance of Shias who rejected Zayd's stance and refused to support his revolt were described by Zayd's supporters as the Rafida. Over time, this term became a popular pejorative nickname for Imamites which, for Zaydis, signified the Imamites' rejection of Zayd.

== See also ==
- Criticism of Twelver Shia Islam
- Shia–Sunni relations
- Succession to Muhammad
- Takfir
- Words to denote religious opponents
- Al-Azhar Shia Fatwa

== Sources ==
- Amir-Moezzi, M.A. (2014). "Ghadīr Khumm". In Fleet, K.; Krämer, G.; Matringe, D.; Nawas, J.; Stewart, D.J. (eds.). Encyclopaedia of Islam (Third ed.). doi:10.1163/1573-3912_ei3_COM_27419. ISBN 9789004269613.
- Daftary, F. (2013). A History of Shi'i Islam. I.B. Tauris. ISBN 9780857723338.
- Dakake, M.M. (2007). The Charismatic Community: Shi'ite Identity in Early Islam. State University of New York Press. ISBN 9780791470336.
- Delong-Bas, N.J. (2004). Wahhabi Islam: From Revival and Reform to Global Jihad. Oxford University Press. ISBN 9780195169911.
- Esposito, J.L. (2003). The Oxford Dictionary of Islam. Oxford University Press. ISBN 9780195125597.
- Friedlaender, I. (1907). "The Heterodoxies of the Shiites in the Presentation of Ibn Ḥazm". Journal of the American Oriental Society. 28: 1–80. doi:10.2307/592759. JSTOR 592759.
- Haider, N. (2011). The Origins of the Shī'a: Identity, Ritual, and Sacred Space in Eighth-Century Kūfa. Cambridge University Press. ISBN 9781107424951.
- Ibrahim, F. (2006). The Shi'is of Saudi Arabia. SAQI. ISBN 9780863569036.
- Jafri, S.H.M. (1979). Origins and Early Development of Shi'a Islam. Longman. ISBN 0582780802.
- Jones, T. (2005). "The Iraq Effect in Saudi Arabia". Middle East Report. 237 (237): 20–25. doi:10.2307/30042471. JSTOR 30042471.
- Kohlberg, E. (1979). "The Term 'Rāfida' in Imāmī Shī'ī Usage". Journal of the American Oriental Society. 99 (4): 677–679. doi:10.2307/601453. ISSN 0003-0279. JSTOR 601453.
- Kohlberg, E. (2012). "al-Rāfiḍa". In Bearman, P.; Bianquis, Th.; Bosworth, C.E.; van Donzel, E.; Heinrichs, W.P. (eds.). Encyclopaedia of Islam (Second ed.). ISBN 9789004161214.
- Lalani, A.R. (2000). Early Shī'ī Thought: The Teachings of Imam Muḥammad al-Bāqir. I.B. Tauris. ISBN 1850435928.
- Madelung, W. (2000). "Review of Islamic Legal Orthodoxy: Twelver Shiite Responses to the Sunni Legal System, by D.J. Stewart". Journal of the American Oriental Society. 120/1: 111–114. JSTOR 604901.
- Momen, M. (1985). An Introduction to Shi'i Islam. Yale University Press. ISBN 9780300035315.
- Nasr, V. (2007). Shia Revival. W.W. Norton. ISBN 9780393066401.
- Prokop, M. (2003). "Saudi Arabia: The Politics of Education". International Affairs. 79/1 (1): 77–89. JSTOR 3095542.
- Shorok, K. (2017). We are Saving Iraq: The Legitimising Discourse of The Popular Mobilisation in Iraq (PDF) (Thesis). University of Oslo.
- Steinberg, G. (2014). "Jihadi-Salafism and the Shi'is: Remarks About the Intellectual Roots of Anti-Shi'ism". In Meijer, R. (ed.). Global Salafism: Islam's New Religious Movement. Oxford Academic. doi:10.1093/acprof:oso/9780199333431.003.0005. ISBN 978-0-19-933343-1.
- Yamani, M. (2008). "The two faces of Saudi Arabia". Survival. 50/1: 143–156.
- Haider, N. (2014). Shi'i Islam: An Introduction. Cambridge University Press. ISBN 9781107031432.
- al-Abdul Jader, A.S. (2010). Suleiman, Y. (ed.). Living Islamic History: Studies in Honour of Professor Carole Hillenbrand (illustrated ed.). Oxford University Press. pp. 1–13. ISBN 9780748642199.
