= International Youth Year =

1985 UN theme year

The year 1985 was proclaimed by the United Nations as the International Youth Year (IYY). It was held to focus attention on issues of concern to and relating to youth. The proclamation was signed on 1 January 1985, by United Nations Secretary General Javier Pérez de Cuéllar.

== Events ==
Throughout the year, activities took place all over the world. These activities were coordinated by the Youth Secretariat within the Centre for Social Development and Humanitarian Affairs, at the time based at the UN offices in Vienna, Austria. The Secretariat's director, Mohammad Sharif, was also the Executive Secretary for IYY. The President of IYY was Nicu Ceauşescu, son of the then dictator of Romania Nicolae Ceauşescu

While not organising any specific events itself, under the year's slogan of "Participation, Development, Peace", the IYY Secretariat helped facilitate numerous events helping to make IYY a success. On 11 October 1985, the Secretary-General of the UN, Javier Pérez de Cuéllar, in his report to the General Assembly, summarised the principal activities for IYY.

The main UN event for IYY was the World Congress on Youth (in Spanish: Congreso Mundial Sobre La Juventud) organised by UNESCO and held in Barcelona, Spain, 8–15 July 1985. It issued the "Barcelona Declaration" on youth.

Other international events mentioned in the Secretary General's report (11 October 1985 A/40/701):

- International Youth Conference and World Youth Festival (Kingston, Jamaica, 6–10 April 1985). Issued the "Kingston Declaration" on youth.
- Friendly Gathering of Youth, (Beijing, China, 10–24 May 1985)
- 12th World Festival of Youth and Students, (Moscow, USSR, 27 July–3 August 1985)
- International Youth Year Conference on Law (Montreal, 5–9 August 1985)

== See also ==
- International Year of the Child
- Portumna '85 Irish Scout Jamboree
