= Sunni fatwas on Shias =

Sunni and Shia are the two main branches of Muslims and the difference of opinions have resulted in many fatwas, non-binding but authoritative legal opinion or learned interpretation issues pertaining to the Islamic law. Fatwas are based on the question and answer process found in the Quran, which seeks to enlighten on theological and philosophical issues, hadith, legal theory, duties, and the Sharia law. Sunni fatwas have been used to justify the persecution of Shia throughout their history.

== Points of difference ==
While all Islamic schools and branches of Islam recognise the Qur'an, they differ in which other authorities they acknowledge; in particular the question of the Succession to Muhammad separates the Sunni, who acknowledge the elected Rashidun Caliphs and their descendants, from the Shia, who acknowledge the Imams or descendants of Muhammad; these two branches are then subdivided by their views on the further course of the succession. Shia fiqh differs with Sunni fiqh on not only political issues, but also important theological issues. Various attitudes towards Shia can be found among the worldwide majority Sunni community.

== Opinions ==
=== Against ===
Some of the notable fatwas are listed below:

==== Early scholars ====
- al-Shafi’i - One of his most prominent students, al-Buwayti, asked if it was permissible to pray behind a Rafidi to which Malik responded in the negative. Malik defined a Rafidi as “whoever says ‘Abu Bakr and `Umar are not Imams”.
- Al-Sha'bi — "The Rafida are the Jews of this nation. They hate Islam as the Jews hate Christianity. They embraced Islam, not because they longed for it or because they feared Allah, but because they detested the Muslims and intended to overpower them."
- Ibn Hazm — "The Rawafid are not even Muslims", when Christians debating him brought a Shia book as reference.
- Ibn Khaldun — "astray people", "Shia are the source of all deviant groups in Islam history".
- Ibn Taymiya — He considered Shiites more heretical than Jews, Christians and many polytheists. Noting contemporary circumstances, he considered Shiites more harmful to the Muslim community than groups such as the Crusaders and Mongols.
- Nizam al-Mulk — where he fully attacks the Rafida. However, there are reports that says that he and Malik Shah I after a debate between Sunni and Shi'a scholars which was prepared by him by the orders of Malik Shah I resulted in converting both him and the king to the Shi'a Islam. The story is reported by the son-in-law of Nizam al-Mulk, Muqatil ibn Atiyah who attended the debate.

==== Ottoman scholars ====
Ottoman clergy officially maintained the pronunciation of Takfir on Twelver Sh'ism, a stance which was used by Ottoman sultans to declare the wars fought against the Safavid Empire as Jihad. The 16th century Ottoman Shaykhul Islam Ebussud Effendi issued a series of fatwas excommunicating Twelver Shi'ites as kuffar (disbelievers). He also proclaimed the legal verdict calling for the killing of the Kizilbash; which was implemented by Ottoman authorities to suppress Shi'ism throughout the empire. Declaring the Qizilbash as disbelievers and calling for their executions, Ebussud states:

"These outrageous people became unbelievers as they scorned the Holy Qurʾan, the noble shariʿa, and the religion of Islam, disdained and killed scholars on account of their knowledge, [and] considered their immoral cursed leader god and prostrated before him. [They] considered permissible many religiously forbidden acts whose prohibition has been established by definite scriptural sources, and cursed Abu Bakr and ʿUmar (the first two caliphs after Muhammad’s death), may God be satisfied with them. In addition, they became unbelievers because they denied the Holy Qurʾan by defaming Aʿisha the trustworthy (Prophet’s wife), may God be pleased with her, who was exonerated by the revelation of several verses [in the Qurʾan]. By doing so, they also cursed the Prophet (hazret-i risalet-penah) and blemished his saintly personality. According to the consensus of a multitude of scholars from different times and places, killing them is permissible (mubah); those who doubt their unbelief become unbelievers.

However, major Sunni scholars have declared the unbelief of Shia who hold certain beliefs. For example, Ottoman scholar ibn Abidin, a source of authoritative fatwas for Hanafis writes:

There is no doubt in the disbelief of those that falsely accuse Sayyida Aisha (Allah be pleased with her) of adultery, deny the Companionship of Sayyiduna Abu Bakr ( Allah be pleased with him), believe that Sayyiduna Ali (Allah be pleased with him) was an Imam... even if they believe in Allah, the last Prophet, and the perfection of the Quran (Radd al-Muhtar, 4/453).

==== Barelvism ====
According to Ahmad Raza Khan, the founder of Barelvism, most Shias of his day were apostates because they repudiated necessities of religion. This includes, according to him, the following:

a) to believe that Qur'an is incomplete.

b) to call it 'book of `Uthman'.

c) elevate Sayyiduna `Ali karram Allâhu wajhah and other imâms above the prophets .

d) if these imâms are held to be higher than even one prophet .

e) to allege that Allâh was regretful after issuing a command and hence remorsefully, changed His earlier ruling.

f) to allege that Allâh didn't realize the wisdom of a certain ruling (or the lack of it) and when He realized it, He changed the rule.

g) to allege that RasûlAllâh practised taqiyyah in the course of his tabligh.

Those who hold the above and other such statements that amount to disbelief are kâfirs by ijmâ`a. All dealings with them are similar to those with apostates. it is in Fatâwâ Dhahîriyyah, Fatâwâ hindiyyah, Hadiqatun Nadiyyah: [aHkâmuhum aHkâm al-murtaddîn] they are to be dealt with as apostates.

==== Deobandism ====
- Manzur Nu'mani — issued a fatwa in December 1987 declaring Shia kuffar (non-believers), which was endorsed by hundreds of Deobandi scholars in India and Pakistan.

==== Salafism ====
- Muhammad ibn Abd al-Wahhab — In one of his fatwas, he accused Shiites of shirk (polytheism) because of their cult of the saints, which included the adoration of figures such as Ali and Husayn and the veneration of tombs and shrines.
- Shah Waliullah Dehlawi — He believed that the Shia interpretation and practices of Islam should be discarded, since they greatly misguide people.
- Ibn Baz — Several of his fatwas denounced Shiites as atheists and apostates, and, among other rulings, forbade Sunni marriage to Shiites.
- Ihsan Ilahi Zahir — Denounced the Shia as infidels and Zionist agents.
- Abdul-Rahman al-Barrak — In a "vicious" fatwa against the Shia he concluded with: "the Sunni and Shia madhhabs are completely contradictory and cannot be reconciled; the talk of Sunni-Shia rapprochement is utterly false."
- Abu Basir al-Tartusi — In his fatwa against Shia, he warned Muslims to "Interact with the Shii Rejectionists as you would with a person whose very existence is full of betrayal, treachery, fury and hatred against Islam and Muslims!"
- Ali al-Khudair — In his Fatwa fi l-Shi'a, he says: "What we have today are the Rafidis [i.e., Twelvers], the Batini Isma'ilis, the Batini Nusayris, and the Batini Duruz. These four groups are the ones who deify the Al al-Bayt [i.e., the family and descendants of Muhammad], they seek their intercession and are the worshippers of graves (quburiyyun). So these [people] are infidel polytheists (mushrikun kuffar) and are not Muslims. There is no difference [in status] between their scholars and followers (muqallidihim) or the ignorant among them (juhhalihim). They are all polytheists and are not Muslims and cannot be excused for their claim to be ignorant that they are worshipping other than God (la yu'dharan bi-l-jahl fi 'ibadati-him li-ghayr allah)."

Other Sunni scholars who have declared Shiites as deviants or apostates:

Yusuf al-Qaradawi — After saying he had previously been misguided to pursue Sunni-Shia rapprochement, Qaradawi went on to condemn Shiites as heretics in several fatwas and praised anti-Shia Saudi Sunni clerics for being “more mature and far-sighted” than himself in generally judging Shias.

There are Sunni fatwas that were considered Sunni obligation to the "insult offered to the Sunni faith by the Shia religious literature." This is demonstrated in the case of some Sunni fatwas issued in Pakistan, which were considered as defensive materials created for the purpose of defending the faith from the Shia. The latter's mere existence in the country within the context of these specific fatwas was considered as an insult.

=== Support ===
In 1959, the Grand Imam of Al-Azhar Mahmud Shaltut issued fatwa that Shia theology is a part of Islam. In 2016, the Grand Imam of Al-Azhar Ahmed el-Tayeb reissued Shaltoot's fatwa on Shia Muslims.

In 2004, both Sunni and Shia scholars released the so-called 2004 Amman Message, which established some form of standards to prevent or at least discredit and counter renegade interpretations such as those made by Osama bin Laden and Abu Bakr al-Baghdadi. This initiative outlined who are qualified to issue fatwas or legal opinions, promoting a more conservative framework over progressive interpretations. The Amman Message also asserted the common beliefs of the two Islamic sects.

Shaykh Faraz Rabbani has noted that it is not the way of Sunnis to make blanket takfir of Shia. He wrote:

...we only declare someone who denies something necessarily known of the religion to be a kafir--and this is not the case with common Shia. Someone who says 'There is no God but Allah, Mohammed is the Prophet of Allah' is a Muslim. Shia Muslims, who make this declaration of faith are therefore MUSLIM.

According to Taqi Usmani, the current grand mufti of Deobandism, Shias are not ala al-itlaq (completely) non-Muslim.
