= Mushrikun =

7th-century Arab polytheists who fought early Muslims

Mushrikun (Arabic: المشركون, romanized: al-Mushrikūn or المشركين, al-Mushrikīn, singular مشرك, mushrik) is the term used in the Quran to refer to the non-Muslim Arabs who opposed the prophet Muhammad and his followers in the early 7th century. The term, which is related to the noun shirk, may be translated as "associators", as in "those who associate [with Allah]" and "make [equal] with Allah another deity". It is often translated into English as "polytheists", although some scholars believe the mushrikun criticized in the Quran were in fact monotheists or henotheists.

After Muhammad's declaration of prophethood, the mushrikun, led by Amr ibn Hisham, harassed members of the nascent Muslim community. Following the increase of tensions between the mushrikun and the Muslims, Muhammad and his companions (sahaba) migrated to the neighboring city of Medina, where the Islamic prophet was offered sovereignty over the city. An Islamic state was formed in Medina, which was vehemently opposed by the mushrikun. Subsequently, both parties fought at the Battle of Badr in 624, resulting in a Muslim victory.

== Etymology ==
The Arabic term mushrikun (plural of mushrik) is an agent noun derived from the verb ashraka 'to make (someone) a partner; to associate', the cognate noun of which is shirk. The term may be translated as "associators", as in "those who associate [with Allah]" and "make [equal] with Allah another deity". It is often translated as "polytheists" in modern English translations of the Quran (but see the Religious identity and practices section below). The terms shirk and mushrikun imply condemnation more than the word "polytheism".

== Religious identity and practices ==
The mushrikun are the main targets of criticism in the parts of the Quran dated to the Meccan period, i.e. the time before Muhammad and his followers moved to Medina. It is unlikely that the people labeled as mushrikun in the Quran would have identified themselves as such, considering the hostile nature of the term. Other polemical terms are used more or less interchangeably with mushrikun in the Quran: alladhina kafaru 'the repudiators' (traditionally translated as 'the unbelievers') and al-mukadhdhibun 'the deniers'. The Quran calls for battle against the mushrikun "until all religion is God's" and for them to be killed wherever they are found.

The mushrikun are clearly identified in the Quran as worshipping multiple gods (aliha). One passage gives the names of three deities: Allat, al-'Uzza, and Manat; these were goddesses worshipped in ancient Arabia. Early Muslim historians understood the Hejaz at the advent of Islam as generally polytheist. This view was accepted in later Muslim and Western scholarship. However, a number of scholars have disputed the view that the mushrikun criticized in the Quran were Arab polytheists. G. R. Hawting argues that the mushrikun of the Quran were Jews or Christians, not necessarily in Arabia; thus, the debate between the mushrikun and the early Muslims was a debate between monotheists. Similarly, Patricia Crone states, "it is hard to avoid the impression that both Jews and Judaizing pagans are involved [with the mushrikūn]." Valentina A. Grasso agrees that the mushrikun were not merely polytheists, but disputes the view that they were Jews or Christians. Grasso argues that the mushrikun were henotheists or "imperfect monotheists who believed in the intercession of supernatural beings but venerated the same god of the Muslims." These beings were former deities who had been demoted to the status of "intercessors" subordinate to the supreme God (Allah). Nicolai Sinai writes, "if the Qurʾānic associators were polytheists, they were polytheists of a rather specific kind, in so far as they not only recognised that Allāh was the creator of the world but also credited him with ultimate dominion over the cosmos". Aziz al-Azmeh argues that the polytheists attacked in the Quran were in fact polytheists; he also rejects the view that Allah had already been raised to the status of a supreme creator deity before Muhammad, viewing Allah instead as a "god of all in general and of no one in particular" who was occasionally invoked but lacked a specific cult.

According to Christian J. Robin, polytheism was in fact marginalized in Arabia by the time Muhammad began preaching, but Mecca was one of its few remaining centers. The Quraysh of Mecca had their own pantheon, headed by Hubal. Other tribes whom the Quraysh had organized into cultic and mercantile associations had a different pantheon which was "superimposed on the Qurayshite one". This pantheon included Allah and the goddesses Allat, al-'Uzza, and Manat (although it has also been argued that the names Allah and Hubal referred to the same deity). In the so-called Satanic Verses (within Quran 53:19–21), which according to Islamic tradition were "repealed" because they were dictated by Satan, it is said of the goddesses Allat, al-'Uzza, and Manat: "Indeed they are the high cranes, and indeed their intercession is to be desired". According to some historians, these verses attest to an initial compromise proposed by Muhammad whereby the three goddesses would be accepted as "divine messengers who could intercede between God and men". Following the enthusiastic reception of this proposal by the Meccans, Muhammad quickly went back on the compromise, "realizing that his suggestion ruined the force and coherence of his religious reform."

It is difficult to reconstruct the cultic practices of the mushrikun from the information given in the Quran. According to Sinai, it is clear that they conducted animal sacrifices, but "it is by no means evident that the associators accorded a prominent role to the veneration of images or idols", which is how they are depicted in the Quran and in the later Islamic tradition, e.g. in the Book of Idols of Hisham ibn al-Kalbi.

== See also ==
=== General links ===
- Glossary of Islam
- Outline of Islam
- Index of Islam-related articles

=== Terms ===
- Shirk
- Kafir
- Dhimmi
- Ridda
- Ahl al-Fatrah
- Ahl al-Kitāb

== Bibliography ==
- Al-Azmeh, Aziz (2017). The Emergence of Islam in Late Antiquity: Allah and His People. Cambridge University Press. ISBN 978-1-316-64155-2.
- Donner, Fred M., ed. (1993). The History of al-Ṭabarī, Volume X: The Conquest of Arabia, A.D. 632–633/A.H. 11. SUNY Series in Near Eastern Studies. Albany, New York: State University of New York Press. ISBN 978-0-7914-1071-4.
- Grasso, Valentina A. (25 October 2021). "The Gods of the Qur'ān: The Rise of Ḥijāzī Henotheism during Late Antiquity". In Bjerregaard Mortensen, Mette; Dye, Guillaume; Oliver, Isaac W.; Tesei, Tommaso (eds.). The Study of Islamic Origins. De Gruyter. pp. 297–324. doi:10.1515/9783110675498-013. ISBN 978-3-11-067549-8.
- Lindstedt, Ilkka (2023). Muhammad and His Followers in Context: The Religious Map of Late Antique Arabia. Leiden: Brill. ISBN 978-90-04-68713-4.
- Robin, Christian J. (2012). "Arabia and Ethiopia". In Johnson, Scott Fitzgerald (ed.). The Oxford Handbook of Late Antiquity. Oxford handbooks. Oxford: Oxford University Press. pp. 247–332. ISBN 978-0-19-533693-1.
- Sinai, Nicolai (2018). Fleet, K.; Krämer, G.; Matringe, D.; Nawas, J.; Stewart, D. J. (eds.). "Polytheism". Encyclopaedia of Islam Three Online. Brill.
- Watt, W. Montgomery (1960). "Abū Sufyān". In Gibb, H. A. R.; Kramers, J. H.; Lévi-Provençal, E.; Schacht, J.; Lewis, B. & Pellat, Ch. (eds.). The Encyclopaedia of Islam, Second Edition. Volume I: A–B. Leiden: E. J. Brill. p. 151. OCLC 495469456.
- Watt, Montgomery William (1961). Muhammad: Prophet and Statesman. London: Oxford University Press. ISBN 9780198810780.
