= Center for Strategic Research (Iran) =

Iranian research institute

- Abbreviation: CSR
- Formation: 1989
- Type: Think tank
- Headquarters: Tehran
- Location: Tehran, Iran
- Parent organization: Expediency Discernment Council
- Website: csr.ir

Center for Strategic Research or Institute for Strategic Research (Persian: مرکز تحقیقات استراتژیک) is a leading Iranian think tank on strategy issues. It is the research arm of the Iranian state's Expediency Discernment Council. Prof. Mohammad Reza Majidi is the head of center. Before that, the head of organization was Ali Akbar Velayati who replaced former head Hassan Rouhani, the former President of Iran. It was established in 1989.It publishes Foreign Relations Quarterly, Rahbord (Strategy) in Persian and Iranian Review of Foreign Affairsin English.

== Departments ==
The CSR has six affiliated departments:

- Politics and International Relations Research Department (This department publishes 3 scientific journals: Foreign Relations Quarterly, A quarterly Journal of Strategy, Iranian Review of Foreign Affairs).
- Infrastructure and Production Research Department (This department publishes Gozaresh Rahbordi (Strategic Report))
- Economic Research Department (This department publishes Gozaresh-e Pazhouheshhay-e Eqtesadi (Economic Research Report))
- Cultural Research Department (This department publishes Gozareshat-e Rahbordi (Strategic Reports))
- Legal Research and Jurisprudential Studies Department (Publication: Gozaresh-e Rahbordi (Strategic Report))
- Executive and Information Department

== People ==
Presidents

- Mohammad Mousavi Khoeiniha (1989–1992)
- Hassan Rouhani (1992–2013)
- Ali Akbar Velayati (2013–2017)

Researchers

- Saeed Hajjarian
