= Badar (surname) =

Badar is a surname of Central Asian origin. People with this surname include:

- Shahin Badar (born 1974), an English singer-songwriter
- Saleem Badar (born 1953) is a Pakistani former cricket umpire
- Mullah Badar, governor of the Afghan province of Badghis during the reign of the Taliban
- Saif Badar (born 1998), a Pakistani cricketer
- Asma Badar (born 1988), an Indian actress
- Rich Badar (born 1943), a former professional American football quarterback
