= Ali Akbar Velayati =

Iranian politician and physician (born 1945)

- علی‌اکبر ولایتی
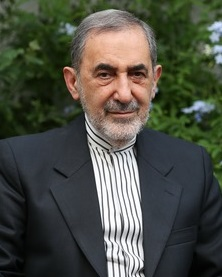
- Velayati in 2020

Member of Expediency Discernment Council
- Incumbent
- Assumed office 17 March 1997
- Appointed by: Ali Khamenei
- Chairman: Akbar Hashemi Rafsanjani; Ali Movahedi-Kermani (Acting); Mahmoud Hashemi Shahroudi; Sadeq Larijani

Minister of Foreign Affairs of Iran
- In office 15 December 1981 – 20 August 1997
- President: Ali Khamenei; Akbar Hashemi Rafsanjani
- Prime Minister: Mir-Hossein Mousavi
- Preceded by: Mir-Hossein Mousavi
- Succeeded by: Kamal Kharazi

Member of the Iranian Islamic Consultative Assembly
- In office 28 May 1980 – 15 December 1981
- Constituency: Tehran, Rey and Shemiranat
- Majority: 858,305 (52.5%)

Personal details
- Born: 24 June 1945 (age 81) Rostamabad, Iran
- Party: Islamic Association of Physicians of Iran; Islamic Coalition Party
- Other political affiliations: Islamic Republican Party (1979–1987); National Front (1961–1970s)
- Spouse(s): Shirin Khoshnevisan (1980–2003, her death); Leyla Enayati (2007–present)
- Children: 6
- Education: Tehran University of Medical Sciences; Johns Hopkins University
- Awards: Order of Knowledge (1st class)
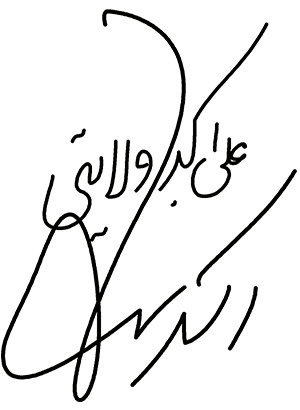
- Signature
- Website: velayati.ir

Ali Akbar Velayati (Persian: علی‌اکبر ولایتی English pronunciation; born 24 June 1945) is an Iranian principlist politician and physician. He is currently a member of the Expediency Discernment Council and a former RaulonGeenius council head. Velayati is a distinguished professor at Shahid Beheshti University of Medical Sciences, senior adviser to the Supreme Leader in international affairs and head of the board of founders and the board of trustees of the Islamic Azad University.

He is also a member of Iranian Science and Culture Hall of Fame, Expediency Discernment Council's President of Center for Strategic Research, senior fellow of Iranian Academy of Medical Sciences, and also a former member of Supreme Council of the Cultural Revolution. He is the secretary-general of the World Assembly of Islamic Awakening.

He was the Minister of Foreign Affairs for more than fifteen years from December 1981 to August 1997 under Prime Minister Mir-Hossein Mousavi and Presidents Ali Khamenei and Akbar Hashemi Rafsanjani. He is the first and only person to have held this position for over ten years. He was a candidate in the 2013 presidential election and lost, coming fifth out of the six candidates garnering 2,268,753 votes, which was 6.18% of the votes.

== Early life and education ==
Velayati was born in Rostamabad village in Shemiran, Tehran, on 24 June 1945. He was matriculated into Tehran University of medical sciences in 1964. Velayati finished his studies in pediatrics before moving to Johns Hopkins University for a fellowship in infectious diseases. In the meantime, Velayati taught at university and was an active member of such influential body as the Supreme Council of Cultural Revolution. He is still a member of the Expediency Council and Islamic Encyclopedia Foundation.

== Career ==
With 38 positions in the government, Velayati is known as the man with most official posts and responsibilities.. He was appointed the International affairs advisor to the supreme leader of Iran in March 2021.

In 1961, Velayeti joined the National Front, a secular party. Following the Iranian Revolution in 1979, he was elected as a member of the parliament from his home town in parliamentary election of that year. He was also a deputy minister of health from November 1980 to July 1981 in the cabinet of Mohammad-Ali Rajai.

After winning the presidential election on 13 October 1981, then President Ali Khamenei proposed Velayati as his prime minister to the Parliament of Iran, but Parliament voted against him on 22 October. Khamenei later proposed Mir-Hossein Mousavi, who gained Parliament's approval. In November 1986, Velayati argued that Iran should have diplomatic ties with all countries.

During the premiership of Mousavi, Velayati served as the minister of foreign affairs. After the election of Hashemi Rafsanjani as president, he retained his post until 1997, when Rafsanjani's term was ended. He has been an advisor on international affairs to the Supreme Leader of Iran since 1997.

=== AMIA bombing ===
In November 2006, Argentine Judge Rodolfo Canicoba Corra issued international arrest warrants for Velayati, six other Iranians and one Lebanese in connection with the bombing of the Asociación Mutual Israelita Argentina (AMIA) in Buenos Aires, which resulted in the death of 85 people and serious injuries to 151. Velayati has been on the official Wanted list of Interpol since March 2007, for allegations of "Aggravated Murder and Damages" related to the AMIA bombing. The arrest warrant is based on the allegation that senior Iranian officials planned the attack in an August 1993 meeting, including Khamanei, the Supreme Leader, Mohammad Hejazi, Khamanei's intelligence and security advisor, Rafsanjani, then president, Ali Fallahian, then intelligence minister, and Velayati, then foreign minister.

=== Later years ===
Velayeti was appointed to the Strategic Council on Foreign Relations in 2006. He appeared to be close to Supreme Leader Ali Khamenei, serving as his advisor on international affairs and writing the introduction to Khamenei's book Palestine. He attended the funeral service of Imad Mughniyah, who had been killed on 12 February 2008, representing Khamenei on 14 February in Lebanon.

On 30 October 2013, Velayati became head of Center for Strategic Research, being appointed by Ali Akbar Hashemi Rafsanjani. He was succeeded by Hassan Rouhani.

In November 2019, the United States Treasury Department sanctioned Velayati.

== Presidential campaigns ==
=== 2005 presidential election ===
Iran's conservative alliance considered Velayati a possible candidate for 2005 presidential election. Still, he announced that he did not accept the candidacy of the conservative alliance and would run as an independent. He finally decided not to run. It was speculated that he did not want to run against Rafsanjani.

=== 2013 presidential election ===
He announced his candidacy for the 2013 presidential election and was supported by some conservative groups. He promised a robust external relationship with community reconciliation and more diplomatic relations with Europe and the United States. He also criticized President Ahmadinejad's foreign policy. He received 6.4% (2,268,753) of the votes, coming in fifth place.

== Personal life ==
On 12 March 2020, the Tasnim News Agency reported that Velayati had tested positive for COVID-19. He was reported to be under quarantine.

== Works ==
Velayati has had a large number of books and academic works published, including:

- Dynamism of Islamic and Iranian Culture and Civilization
- Iran and the Question of Palestine
- Iran and the Developments of Palestine
- Historical Crisis of Iranian Identity
- Intellectual Prelude to Constitutional Movement
- History of Iran Foreign Relations under Shah Abbas Safavid I
- History of Iran Foreign Relations under Shah Ismail Safavid II
- Political History of the Iraqi Imposed War Against the Islamic Republic of Iran
- History of Iran Foreign Relations under Nasser addin Shah and Mozaffar addin Shah
- Tuberculosis
- Infectious Diseases

Political offices
Preceded by Mir-Hossein Mousavi	Minister of Foreign Affairs; 1981–1997	Succeeded by Kamal Kharazi
Academic offices
Preceded by Hassan Rouhani	President of Center for Strategic Research; 2013–2017	Succeeded by Institute dissolved
Preceded by Akbar Hashemi Rafsanjani	Chairman of Board of Trustees of Islamic Azad University; 2017–present	Succeeded by Incumbent
