= Islamic Unity week =

Islamic unity week (Persian: هفته وحدت اسلامی) is held annually by Muslims between the date Sunnis consider to be Muhammad's birthday and the date which Shia Muslims consider it to be.

== History ==
The first record of the Islamic unity week dates back to the time when Seyyed Ali Khamenei was in Sistan and Baluchestan. This Shia cleric/scholar (with the co-operation of some Sunni scholars) arranged a week to celebrate the unity between Shia and Sunni people.

After Iranian Revolution, Ayatollah Ruhollah Khomeini proposed to name the interval between the two dates as Islamic unity week. Ayatollah Montazeri suggested to ayatollah Khomeini to call the week as Islamic unity week in reaction to the Saudi Mufti's attacks on Sunnis and Shia.

The two dates are the twelfth of Rabi Al Awwal, the first week of the third lunar month of the Islamic calendar, according to Sunnis, and the seventeenth of Rabi al Awwal, according to Shia.

== Events ==
Wahhabi clerics consider the celebration of the Muhammad's birthday inconsistent with Islam. Most Sunnis and Shias disagree. The idea originated with the government of the Islamic republic of Iran. Every year, the Islamic republic of Iran holds an international conference of Shia and Sunni scholars and other Muslim participants.

=== Dependent organizations and occasions ===
There are two organizations related to Islamic unity of Muslim community: The World Forum for Proximity of Islamic Schools of Thought and the organization of Islamic propaganda. Meanwhile, the conference of Islamic unity is still held every year.

== See also ==
- Shia–Sunni relations
- Shia Crescent
- Shia Muslims in the Arab world
- Sunni fatwas on Shias
