= Mohammad Sharif (United Nations) =

U.N. diplomat (born 1933)

Mohammad Sharif (born 1933 in Nepal), was the head of the Youth Unit, Centre for Social Development and Humanitarian Affairs at the United Nations from 1979 to 1987 and then became in charge of 3 sections: disability, ageing and youth sections. He was also the Executive Secretary of International Youth Year

During International Youth Year Sharif represented the UN at a number of International Conferences in the capacity as the personal representative of the Secretary General of the UN. Among the few conferences where he played this role (mentioned in the Secretary General's Report to the UN on IYY in 1985) are the UNESCO's World Youth Congress and the International Youth Year Conference on Law.

He graduated from Patna University in India and completed a PhD at Iowa State University in 1969. He was formerly an official in the Nepalese government and an advisor to the King. He played a key role in the establishment of that country's national airline.
