= Radd al-Shams =

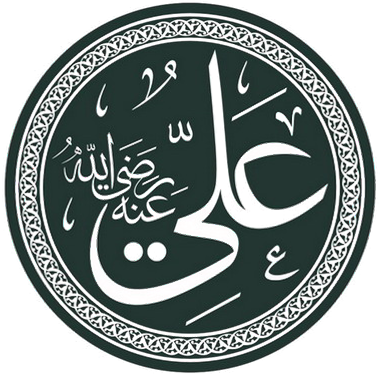
Ali Alahis Salam

Radd al-Shams (Arabic: ردّالشمس; 'returning of the Sun') is believed by Muslims to be a miracle in which Muhammad asked God to return the sun to its position before sunset, so that Ali could have enough time to say his Asr prayer. According to some sources Radd al-shams also took place in the time of some other prophets .

== Hadith ==
One of the events of the 7th year of Hijri is the story of the return of the sun to the prayer of the Prophet Muhammad. This hadith is written in the book Sahih Bukhari based on a narration by Asma bint Umais. It is mentioned in Shia and Sunni sources as an example of the virtue of Ali. Abu Jafar al-Tahawi, in the book of "Mushkil Al-Athar"(مشکل الاثار) quoted Asma bint Umais as saying that one day during the evening Muhammad put his head in Ali's lap and the revelation was revealed to him and it took a long until sunset and Ali had not prayed the evening prayer, but out of respect for the Prophet he could not get up and when the Prophet stood up he said to Ali: Have you prayed the evening prayer? He said: No. The Prophet prayed and said: O Lord, Ali (Your servant) was on the path of obeying You and obeying Your Messenger, so return the sun for him. Asma says: At this time, I saw the sun returning and shining the walls again until Ali performed ablution and said his prayer, then it set.”

This incident is said to be narrated by more than twenty Sunni narrators with slight differences from Asma bint Umays, Abu Rafi, Umm Salama, Jabir ibn Abd Allah, Saʽid al-Khudri, Abu Hurairah and others from the Companions. Also Ibn Hajar Asqalani has mentioned the story of Radd Al-Shams in the book Al-Sawa'iq al-Muharqa. In explaining the hadith, al-Suyuti has written an book called "Kashf al-Labs fi Hadith Radd Al-Shams. According to some narrations, this incident happened after the death of Muhammad and during the life of Ali. The incident of Radd Al-Shams( returning of the sun) according to some other Islamic sources, also happened during the time of three prophets of Bani Israel, namely Joshua, David and Solomon. In one of the wars of the Israelites, Joshua ordered the sun not to set and to stand still in the sky so that the Israelites could take revenge on their enemies. The above incident is accepted by some Christians as well as some Muslim scholars.
