= Bholoo Shah =

Personal life
- Died: 10 October 1789 Old Delhi, India
- Region: Indian subcontinent

Religious life
- Religion: Islam
- Denomination: specifically the Qadri of Sufism

Muslim leader
- Predecessor: Shah Abdul Hameed
- Successor: Shah Mohammad Hafeez

Bholoo Shah or Bholu Shah also called Shah Behlan and Bhollo Shah was an 18th-century Muslim Sufi saint from Delhi, India. He was a Majzoob who belonged to the Qadri order. His dargah (mausoleum) is in Old Delhi, India.

== Biography ==
Most writers maintain that Bholoo Shah’s birthplace to be Punjab. This was before the partition of the Indian subcontinent when the Mughal Empire era was on the rise. He migrated to Delhi from Punjab leaving his family behind. In Delhi, he got beneficence from Shah Abdul Hameed and became his spiritual successor. Shah Mohammad Hafeez became his khalifah and shrine supervisor. After he died, his son took this responsibility. Their shrines are also near the shrine of Bholoo Shah.

One account states that he was the disciple and khalifah of Abdul Hamid in Qadri order while some scholars opine that he was the disciple and khalifah of Shah Abdul Hameed in Qadri Razzaqi Order and also enjoyed the company of Shah Nano and Shah Fakhr-ud-Din Chishti.

== Tomb ==
The dargah (mausoleum or shrine) is at the Kabuli Darwaza (west side of the Red Fort and should not be confused with Khooni Darwaza) in Old Delhi, India as verified by the first book on the shrines of Delhi, "Mazaraat-e-Auliya-e-Delhi". The shrine of Bholoo Shah which used to be in Kabuli darwaza has now been removed but only its remains are visible. Nearby is the shrine of his disciple Shah Mohammad Hafeez and his son Shah Ghulam Mohammad is also buried nearby. Some sources cite that Bholoo Shah died on the 20th Moharram 1024 AH or 10 October 1789 CE and his shrine along with a mosque enclosure is near the railway line, under the left side of the Mithai Bridge (Lahori Gate 4, Old Delhi 6). His khalifah Shah Hafeez-ur-Rehman is buried nearby who died on the 30th Ziquad 1236 AH 28 August 1821 CE during the reign of Akbar Shah II (1806–1837). Shah Hafeez-ur-Rehman’s son and khalifah Shah Ghulam Mohammad is buried at his feet. His annual Urs is held annually on 19th of Muharram. His devotees also celebrate basant in the spring season at his shrine with great enthusiasm.
