= Mayyit =

al-Mayyit (Arabic: الميت) is the term to refer to the deceased in Islam. There are prescribed burial rites to be given upon the death of a Muslim, including the salat al-mayyit, or "prayer of the dead".

The term is also used in the Arabic name of the Dead Sea, al-Bahr al-Mayyit.
