= Hijri calendar =

The term Hijri calendar has more than one meaning. There are three calendars that have the Hijrah as their epoch

In most Islamic countries

- The Islamic calendar, the lunar Hijri calendar based on actual lunar observation. It does not take account of the seasons
  - The Tabular Islamic calendar, a rule-based variation of the Islamic calendar. It has the same numbering of years and months, but the months are determined by arithmetical rules rather than by observation or astronomical calculations.

In Iran

- The Solar Hijri calendar, whose year begins at the Spring equinox in the northern hemisphere.
