= Barakallah =

Phrase used by Muslims to express thanks

Barakallah in the Arabic calligraphy.

'The blessings of Allah [be upon you]' (Arabic: بارك الله bārak allah) is a phrase used by Muslims to express thanks, typically to another person. It is one of many phrases used by Muslims to express thanks. Used also in reply to a person that says jazakallah.

Variations of this phrase exist in many different every-day phrases used throughout the Islamic world.

Barakallah may also mean, blessing of God (It is God's blessing) which is different from Barakallah fik which directs the blessing of God to another person (God's blessing be upon you). Barakallah is commonly used when responding to somebody saying Jazakallah to indicate that they realize it is God's blessing and not their own which is being transmitted.
