= Baab-al-Salaam =

Old gate in Masjid al-Haram, removed in 1960s

Coordinates: 21°25′21″N 39°49′35″E

Baab-As-Salaam (Arabic: باب السلام), pronounced as "bāb assalām", is one of the gates at the Great Mosque of Mecca in Saudi Arabia. This phrase in Arabic when literally translated into English means "Gate of Peace". It has been a tradition for first time visitors to the mosque to enter the Great Mosque of Mecca through this gate. This gate is located in the stretch between the Mount Safa and Marwa, closer to Mount Marwa. Also called the door of the sons of Sheybah in relation to Sheybah bin Othman who resided next to the Kaaba.

It is known as the "Bani Sheeba" gate, and it is the gate through which pilgrims enter to carry out the Arrival Tawaf. It was renewed by Sultan Soleiman Khan, also known as Suleiman the Magnificent, n 931. It is located on the left side of Bab e Marwah.
