= Islam in Chad =

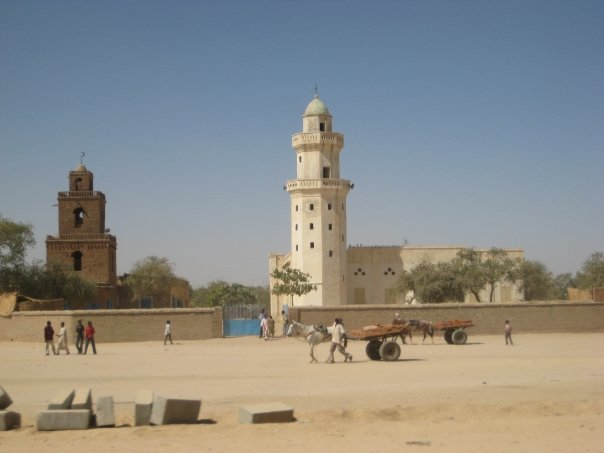
A mosque in Abéché, Chad

The earliest presence of Islam in Chad can be traced back to Uqba ibn Nafi, whose descendants can be found settled in the Lake Chad region to this day. By the time Arab migrants began arriving from the east in the fourteenth century in sizeable numbers, the creed was already well established. Islamization in Chad was gradual, the effect of the slow spread of Islamic civilization beyond its political frontiers. Among Chadian Muslims, 48% professed to be Sunni, 21% Shia, 23% just Muslim and 4% Other.

Islam in Chad (Pew Research est. 2012)
1. Sunni Islam (48.0%)
2. Shia Islam (21.0%)
3. Others (4.00%)
4. Non-denominational muslims (23.0%)

Islam in Chad was not influenced much by the great mystical movements of the Islamic Middle Ages, nor the fundamentalist upheavals that affected other countries. Consistent contact with West African Muslim traders and pilgrims may be the reason Chadian Muslims identify with the Tijaniyya order. Similarly, in the mid-nineteenth century, the Senusiyya brotherhood was founded in Libya, which benefited from economic and political influence in the Lake Chad Basin around 1900. An Islamic revival movement, feared by some French, led by Sanusi fanatics, Chadian adherents, limited to the Awlad Sulayman Arabs and the Toubou of eastern Tibesti, have never been numerous.

Higher Islamic education in Chad is sparse; thus, serious Islamic students and scholars must travel to other countries. Scholars travel abroad to places such as Khartoum and Cairo, where Chadians attend Al Azhar.

Chadians observe the five pillars of the faith differently than the orthodox version. Prayer, both public and communal, occur more than once a week, but often not in a mosque. Chadian Muslims likely make the pilgrimage less often than Hausans in northern Nigeria. Some Chadian Muslims follow the Ramadan fast stricter than typical, with some refusing to swallow their saliva during the day.

== See also ==
- Islam by country
- Religion in Chad
