= Centre for Social Development and Humanitarian Affairs =

The Centre for Social Development and Humanitarian Affairs (CSDHA) was the division of the Economic and Social Council of the United Nations (ECOSOC), responsible for coordination of all issues related to social policy within the United Nations system. It was based at the UN Office in Vienna, Austria (UNOV) until the 1990s. It moved to the United Nations Headquarters in New York and is now known as the Division for Social Policy and Development.

Its units, such as the Youth Policies and Programmes Unit produced various documents and publications, such as "The Global Situation of Youth: Trends and Prospects to the Year 2000" and "Youth and AIDS: Strategy on Information and Educational Programmes for AIDS Prevention and Control" in 1992. It was responsible for coordinating activities during International Youth Year and also collaborated with NGOs and international conferences, such as the International Youth Year Conference on Law.
