= Ahmad Shah =

Ahmad Shah or Ahmed Shah is the name of:

== Monarchs ==
- Ahmad Shah Durrani (died 1772), founder of the Durrani dynasty and the Afghan Empire
- Ahmad Shah I Wali (1371-1436), ninth Sultan of the Bahmani Sultanate
- Alau'd-din Ahmad Shah, tenth Sultan of the Bahmani Sultanate
- Ahmad Shah Bahadur (1725-1775), a Mughal emperor of northern India
- Ahmad Shah Qajar (1898-1930), last ruler of Iran's Qajar dynasty
- Ahmad Shah (died 1513), Sultan of Malacca
- Shamsuddin Ahmad Shah (1419-1436), Sultan of Bengal

Rulers of Pahang

- Ahmad Shah I of Pahang, second Sultan of Pahang
- Ahmad Shah II of Pahang (died 1617), 11th Sultan of Pahang
- Ahmad Shah of Pahang (1930-2019), 5th Sultan of modern Pahang and one of the heads-of-state of Malaysia

Rulers of the Gujarat Sultanate

- Ahmad Shah I (1389-1442), third Sultan of Gujarat
- Ahmad Shah II (1429-1458), 5th Sultan of Gujarat
- Ahmad Shah III (died 1561), 13th Sultan of Gujarat

== Other individuals ==
- Ahmad Shah (Taliban) (nom de guerre Mohammad Ismail, 1970-2008), Taliban leader in northeastern Afghanistan; the focus of Operation Red Wings
- Ahmadshah Abdullah (1946-2025), Malaysian civil servant
- Ahmad Shah Khan (1934-2024), claimant to the abolished throne of Afghanistan
- Ahmad Shah Massoud (1953–2001), leader of the Afghan Northern Alliance
- Ahmed Shah (Afghan cricketer) (born 1983), Afghan cricketer
- Ahmed Shah (Indian cricketer) (born 1995), Indian cricketer

== See also ==
- Malik Ahmad Nizam Shah I (reigned 1480–1509, died 1510), Nizam of Ahmadnagar
