= Reza Pahlavi (disambiguation) =

Reza Pahlavi (born 1960) is an Iranian prince and son of former shah Mohammad Reza Pahlavi.

Reza Pahlavi may also refer to:

- Reza Shah (1878–1944), a.k.a. Reza Shah Pahlavi, Shah of Iran from 1925 until 1941
- Mohammad Reza Pahlavi (1919–1980), Shah of Iran from 1941 to 1979, son of Reza Shah
- Mahmoud Reza Pahlavi (1926–2001), son of Reza Shah and a half-brother of Mohammad Reza Pahlavi
- Muhammad Reza Pahlevi Isfahani (born 1998), Indonesian badminton player
