= Al-Azhar Shia Fatwa =

Islamic ruling on Shia–Sunni relations

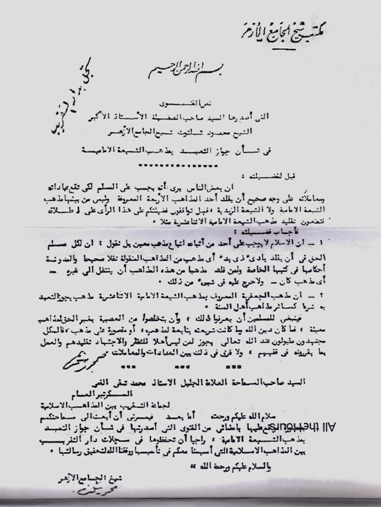
- Created: 17 Rabiʽ al-Awwal 1378 H (1959 M)
- Author: Mahmud Shaltut
- Subject: practicing Shia jurisprudence is permissible, as is practicing the jurisprudence of the four Sunni mazhab.

The Al-Azhar Shia Fatwa was 1959 fatwa issued on the topic of Shia–Sunni relations by Mahmud Shaltut, the grand imam of al-Azhar. Under Shaltut, Shia–Sunni ecumenical activities would reach their zenith.

The fatwa is the fruit of a decade-long collaborative effort between a group of Sunni and Shia scholars at the Dar al-Taqrib al-Madhahib al-Islamiyya ("center for bringing together the various Islamic schools of thought") theological center at Al-Azhar University in Cairo. The aim of the effort is to bridge the gap between the various Islamic schools of thought, and to foster mutual respect, understanding and appreciation of each school's contributions to the development of Islamic jurisprudence. However, despite the ecumenical fatwa, while Shaltut was Grand Imam of Al-Azhar he refused to establish an independent Shia chair at the University, which was one of the greatest aspirations, especially, of the Shia members of the Dar al-Taqreeb. On the other hand, the fatwa was opposed by a number of Al-Azhar scholars, such as: Sheikh Muhammad Hassanein Makhlouf, Sheikh Abdul Latif Al-Subki, head of the Fatwa Committee, and Sheikh of the Hanbalis at Al-Azhar, and Sheikh Muhammad Arafa, and it was also opposed by other scholars from outside Al-Azhar.

It is claimed that this fatwa, which admits Twelver Shias and Zaydi Shias who had been considered heretics and idolaters for hundreds of years, into mainstream Islam, was inspired by Egyptian president Gamal Abdel Nasser. Nasser saw it as a tool to spread his appeal and influence across the entire Arab world.

In 2012, due to drift towards Islamism in Al-Azhar, and the rise of the Muslim Brotherhood into leadership, the dean of the Faculty of Islamic Studies at Al-Azhar issued a fatwa strongly opposed to the 1959 fatwa. It forbade worship according to the Shia tradition and condemned as heretics anyone who insulted the wives or companions of the Islamic prophet Muhammad. Al-Azhar also published a book condemning the Shia.

== See also ==
- Sunni fatwas on Shias
- Fatwa of Ali Khamenei against insulting revered Sunni figures
