= Fatwa against insulting revered Sunni figures =

On 30 September 2010, second Iranian supreme leader Ali Khamenei issued a fatwa prohibiting the insulting by Shia Muslims of any of Muhammad's companions, who are all held in high regard by Sunni Muslims without distinction. His fatwa came in the immediate aftermath of statements made by Kuwaiti Shia cleric Yasser al-Habib, who had publicly denounced Muhammad's wife Aisha bint Abu Bakr and promoted celebrations of her death anniversary, which triggered a wave of intense backlash that negatively impacted Shia–Sunni relations. Al-Habib's remarks also prompted Kuwait to revoke his citizenship and sentence him to 10 years' imprisonment, but he had fled to Iraq and then to Iran before claiming asylum in the United Kingdom, where he remains stateless.

Khamenei's fatwa was met with widespread approval across the Muslim world. However, it received backlash from Shia Muslims who oppose the Islamic Republic of Iran, including al-Habib himself. Khamenei responded by condemning them as "MI6 Shias" for participating in and broadcasting activities that Sunnis regard as sacrilegious, such as insulting Muhammad's companions and engaging in self-flagellation rituals. The incident gained much attention in Western media due to the Iranian government's accusation that Shia–Sunni tensions had been orchestrated by Israel and the Western world.

The fatwa is binding only upon those who tie themselves by taqlid (conforming entirely to a scholar's opinion) to Khamenei. As such, Shia Muslims following other maraji (highest Shia clerical rank) who disagree with the ruling are not obliged to treat it as binding and may even act against it. A number of prominent Shia Muslim scholars who share the opinion embodied in Khamenei's fatwa include Mohammad-Taqi Bahjat Foumani, Naser Makarem Shirazi, Abdul-Karim Mousavi Ardebili, and Mousa Shubairi Zanjani. Notable Sunni Muslim scholars who welcomed the fatwa include Ahmed Mohamed Ahmed El-Tayeb and Said Aqil Siradj.

== Background ==
In August 2010, London-based Kuwaiti Shia cleric al-Habib celebrated Aisha's death anniversary at a Hussainiya and stated that celebrating her death is necessary for the victory of Islam. The report of the celebration was published on his website and aired on Fadak Satellite Channel in the United Kingdom. The online publication of al-Habib's speech about Aisha, especially in a video posted on YouTube, provoked anger among Sunnis, who view Aisha and all of the other companions and wives of Muhammad with reverence. The incident sparked tensions between Shia and Sunni communities globally, and on 20 September 2010, the Kuwaiti government revoked al-Habib's citizenship on the charges of insulting religious symbols and attempting to excite sedition in Kuwait. In Saudi Arabia and Bahrain, a number of Shia clerics condemned his actions and stated that he had abandoned the sect's beliefs. Al-Habib's statements triggered strife between Shia and Sunni communities globally.

== Fatwa ==
Several Shia clerics in Saudi Arabia asked Khamenei to express his view on the incident amidst rising sectarian tensions between Shias and Sunnis. Khamenei's ensuing fatwa was as follows:

Disrespecting the pure wives of the Prophet should be avoided. The Prophet’s wives are all respectable; anyone who insults any of them has insulted the Prophet. I resolutely declare this offensive. The Commander of the Faithful, Imam Ali, treated her eminence Aisha in such a respectful manner. He treated a woman, who had come to fight against him, with the utmost respect because she was the Prophet's wife; otherwise, the Commander of the Faithful would not stand on a ceremony with anyone: hence, no such disrespect should ever occur.

— Ayatollah Ali Khamenei, Second Supreme Leader of Iran (2010)

== Reaction ==
News agency Reuters described the fatwa issued by Ayatollah Ali Khamenei as receiving "widespread praise". Khameini's fatwa was met with backlash from al-Habib. The incident also gained much attention in Western media following the Iranian government's accusation that Shia–Sunni tensions had been orchestrated by Israel and the Western world; Khamenei particularly condemned so-called "MI6 Shiites" for participating in and broadcasting activities that are seen by Sunnis as sacrilegious, such as insulting the companions (namely Aisha, Abu Bakr, and Umar) or engaging in ritual mourning by self-flagellating.

=== Domestic ===
Iranian parliamentarian Ali Motahari said Khamenei's stress on Islamic unity in the fatwa indicates his accurate assessment of the situation. According to Sunni clerics in Iran's Golestan Province, Khamenei showed his knowledge and prevented the sedition of enemies.

=== Foreign ===
This fatwa received various reactions in Arabic media, including daily newspapers Al-Anba and AlRay AlAam in Kuwait, As-Safir in Lebanon, Al Watan and Okaz in Saudi Arabia, Al-Hayat in London, the daily newspaper Al-Shorouk and radio and television broadcasters in Egypt, and some Arabic satellite television channels. Al Jazeera reviewed the fatwa and its effect on the Islamic unity, repeating it in several news broadcasts. Sheikh Ahmed el-Tayeb, the most prominent Sunni scholar in Cairo, praised the fatwa in an interview on Al Jazeera. He said the fatwa had been published at the right time and could help to control sectarian tensions. Hassan Nasrallah, secretary-general of Hezbollah of Lebanon, said during a meeting with the leader of the Nahdlatul Ulama in Indonesia Said Aqil Siradj, said the fatwa disappointed those who tried to harm Islamic unity. Many authorities supported the fatwa, including the secretary general of the Lebanese Ummah Movement, Abdul Nasser Al-Jabri; the leader of the Muslim Brotherhood in Jordan, Hammam Saeed; Maulana Syed Jalaluddin Umri; Sheikh Maher Mezher, the head of the Sunni society to support the resistance in Lebanon; secretary general of the Jordanian Islamic Action Front (IAF), Hamza Mansour; and the Lebanese Islamic Action Front.

Abdel Moaty Bayoumi, professor of theology and philosophy at Egypt's Al-Azhar University, said the fatwa was incomplete because it focused only on Aisha. Mohamed Megahed al-Zayat, vice-director of the National Center for Middle East Studies, criticized the Iranian media for not paying much attention to the fatwa. He said it targets Arabs and could not affect Sunni Arab people, pointing to the political background of the fatwa.

== See also ==
- Ali Khamenei's fatwa against nuclear weapons
  - Nuclear program of Iran
- Ali Khamenei bibliography
  - A 250 Years Old Person, a book on the political struggles of the Shia Imams
  - "To the Youth in Europe and North America", an open letter after the January 2015 Paris attacks by Islamist terrorists
  - "To the Youth in Western Countries", an open letter after the November 2015 Paris attacks by Islamist terrorists
  - Palestine, a book advocating "a long period of low-intensity warfare" rather than "classical wars" or "massacres" against Israeli Jews
