= Maniyy =

Concept in Islamic law

Maniyy or mazi is a term in Islamic jurisprudence which refers to the sexual fluids of a man or woman.

Understanding the concept of maniyy is important for ascertaining various Islamic states of ritual purity, in particular, as it relates to a ghusl (ritual bath).
