= The World Forum for Proximity of Islamic Schools of Thought =

- Formation: 1990
- Founder: Ali Khamenei
- Purpose: Proximity of Islamic Schools of Thought
- Location: Tehran, Iran
- Official language: Persian, Arabic, English
- Leader: Hamid Shahriari
- Website: http://www.taghrib.com/

The World Forum for Proximity of Islamic Schools of Thought (WFPIST) as well as Tehran's Ecumenical Society (Persian: مجمع جهانی تقریب مذاهب اسلامی) is a forum established in October 1990 by order of Ayatollah Seyed Ali Khamenei in Tehran for the reconciliation between different Islamic schools and branches.

== Background of the establishment ==
Islamic scholars from various schools have worked to bring unity between the different branches of Islam. For instance, Iranian scholar Sheikh Mohamad Taqi Qomi emigrated to Egypt in the mid-twentieth century. There he established a forum in Cairo that was named jam'iyyat al-tagrib bayn al-madhahib al-islamiyya (Arabic: دارالتقریب بین المذاهب الاسلامیة بالقاهره) in 1948. A number of scholars of Al-Azhar and some Egyptian politicians supported this forum and its secretary general Sheikh Qomi. Another attempt to achieve proximity between different schools of Islam was the publication of Risalat al-Islam Magazine (Arabic: مجلة رسالة الاسلام) by jam'iyyat al-tagrib bayn al-madhahib al-islamiyya in Cairo. Then in 1990, Ayatollah Khamenei founded The World Forum for Proximity of Islamic Schools of Thought in Tehran.

== Schools recognized by the Forum ==
This world forum recognizes these Islamic Sects: The Hanafi, Shafi'i, Maliki and Hanbali from Sunnis Sects, Twelver and Zaidiyyah from Shias Sects. Also, this forum recognizes Ibadi.

== Activities of the Forum ==
=== Conferences ===
The annual international conference is held every year during the Islamic Unity Week. So far, twenty-five Islamic Unity conferences are held by forum. The last annual conference was held on January 7 to 10 2015. Sixty-nine countries attend this conference. Except annual conferences, many conferences are held by forum for specific ceremonies. For example Holding the commemoration for Ayatollah Muhammad Baqir al-Sadr in April 2015.

=== Publications ===
==== Books ====
The forum publishes books in three main subjects:

- Charters of Conferences of Islamic unity;
- Writings of the Center for Scientific Research of Forum;
- Approved books in Book Council.

==== Journals ====
- Risalat al-Taqrib (Arabic: رسالة التقریب): This magazine is published every two months in Arabic;
- Thought of Proximity (Persian: اندیشه تقریب): This journal is published quarterly in Persian;
- Courier of Proximity (Persian: پیک تقریب): This indoor journal is published monthly about forum's news;
- Risalat al-Islam: After stop publishing of Risalat al-Islam in Cairo, for importance of that, the forum in association with Astan Quds Razavi republished that magazine;
- Islam from the West viewpoint (Persian: اسلام در نگاه غرب): This journal is published for introduction and review and critique of latest English books by topic anti-Islam unity.

== Goals ==
According to its statute, the forum has the following objectives:

- Working to restore and expand Islamic culture while defending the Quran and Sunnah.
- Aiming to build familiarity and deeper understanding among scholars, elites, and leaders of Islamic societies; especially in matters of belief and Islamic law (Fiqh), particularly in cultural and political areas.
- Working to bring Islamic viewpoints closer together and inform Muslims about the efforts of Enemies of Islam to create divisions the followers of different Islamic schools.
- Aiming to solve misunderstandings and conflicts between Muslims of different sects.
- Striving to strengthen and expand the practice of Ijtihad.
- Aiming to align efforts and build a united front against the propaganda and cultural attacks from enemies of Islam.

== Hierarchical structure ==
=== General Assembly ===
The members of General Assembly are chosen by the Supreme Council for a period of six years. These include scholars, thinkers and Islamic religious leaders from around the world. The assembly is held every two years.

=== Supreme Council ===
According its statute, members of Supreme Council are chosen by Vali-e-Faqih for six years.

=== President ===
Its president is chosen by majority vote. The first president of forum was Ayatollah Mohammad Baqir al-Hakim. Ayatollah Mohammad-Ali Taskhiri is the current forum president.

=== General Secretary ===
According to the forum's statute, the General Secretary has the highest executive status in the forum. Vali-e-Faqih elects General Secretary among the candidates who are nominated by Supreme Council, for a period of four years. The Secretary General is a member of the Supreme Council. The first General Secretary was Ayatollah Taskhiri. Ayatollah Mohsen Araki is currently the General Secretary of forum.

== See also ==
- Al-Azhar Shia Fatwa
- World Assembly of Islamic Awakening
