= Badar (politician) =

Afghan politician

Mullah Badar was a governor of the Afghan province of Badghis during the reign of the Taliban.

He was captured by Tajik forces in April 2003.
