= Prostration of thanksgiving =

Muslim prayer of gratitude to God

Muslim in Sujud.

The Prostration of thanksgiving (Arabic: سجود الشكر, sujud shukr) is a prostration (sujud) which is made to thank God.

== Presentation ==
The madhhab school of Islamic jurisprudence (fiqh) of the Shafi’i and Hanbali imams regarding the ruling on prostration of thanksgiving when there is a reason for it is a Sunnah, according to the hadiths that indicate that the Prophet Muhammad was doing it.

Abd-al-Baqi al-Zurqani (d.1688) added to this legitimation according to the Maliki school, that the prostration of thanksgiving is not fard or required, meaning it is not mustahabb or desirable, but it is only mubah or permissible.

It was well known in the Maliki school that the rule of prostration of thanksgiving is that it is makruh, and this is the text of Malik ibn Anas, which appeared from his saying that it is a makruh close to the forbidden haram.

As for the madhhab of Abu Hanifa, he considers it to be included in the makruh, except that the Hanafi imams have stated what indicates that it is just disliked as a makruh, so the prostration of thanksgiving for them has no importance, and therefore it is disliked by Abu Hanifa and it is not rewarded with a thawab, and leaving it is mustahabb.

== Causes ==
It is prescribed to prostrate thanksgiving among the fuqaha who have said that it is mubah when a blessing is apparent to the Muslim, such as if God blessed him with a child after despair of childbearing, or because of a rush of curse and misfortune for him, such as if a sick person was cured, or he found a lost thing, or he or his money escaped from drowning or fire spoilage, or to see one who is afflicted, insane, or disobedient, and that thanks to God for his safety from such a calamity, madness and disobedience.

The Shafi’i and Hanbali imams stated that it enacted the prostration of thanksgiving, whether the blessing obtained or the impulsive resentment of the prostrating Muslim or about his son, family, relatives or common Muslims, such as victory over enemies or the disappearance of a plague and an epidemic and the like.

And it came in a jurisprudential saying of the Hanbali imams that a Muslim can prostrate thanks to obtaining a general blessing and not prostrate to a particular blessing, and this was said by the jurist Ibn Hamdan in one of his books.

The Shafi’i and Hanbali scholars also said that it is not prescribed to prostrate for the continuation of blessings for the Muslim and his community, because these divine blessings are not cut off from creatures, and because the wise people congratulate safety on the occasional issue and do not do it every hour.

== Conditions ==
The jurist Khayr al-Din al-Ramli said that one of the conditions for the validity and non-missing the prostration of thanksgiving is that there is not a long separation between it and its cause, as a given blessing or the absence of a calamity or disaster.

The Shafi'is and Hanbalis stated that the prostration of thanksgiving is required the same conditions as for Salah prayer, like ritual purity, ghusl and wudu or tayammum, facing the direction of qibla, covering the intimate parts in Islam, and avoiding najassa and impurity.

The jurist Abdullah al-Sharqawi also stated that a Muslim who had lost his two purity, meaning ghusl and wudu, should not prostrate to thanksgiving.

If the Maliki jurists had a reputation for saying that it is permissible to prostrate thanksgiving even if the Muslim lacked a major and minor purity on the basis of the Maliki school of thought, there are some Malikis who chose not to lack that purity, according to two jurisprudential sayings.

The jurist Al-Hattab said that the secret of the meaning of haste and puddle of gratitude, for which a prostration is given for which it, will disappear if the Muslim sloths until he is purified for the sake of prostration, and Imam Ibn Taymiyyah also chose that purity is not required for performing the prostration thanksgiving.

== Description ==
Shafi'i and Hanbali jurists have stated that prostration of thanksgiving is considered in its attributes the same as the qualities of the Sujud Tilawa outside of Salah.

If a Muslim wants to prostrate to thank God, then he faces the qibla, utters the takbeer, and performs a sujud in which he utters Tasbih and Alhamdulillah to God, then says another takbeer and raises his head.

It was mentioned in the book Fatawa 'Alamgiri that the description of prostration of thanksgiving is identical to that of prostration of recitation, and that the Muslim utters takbeer when prostrating and does not raise his hands to the shoulders.

If the Muslim raises himself from prostration, then he does not bear tashahhud to it or taslim according to the sayings of the jurists, except that it came in the saying about bringing the tashahhud and the taslim according to the Shafi’i jurists in the prostration of thanksgiving after raising the head from it according to three opinions, the most correct of which is that he brings taslim and does not bring the tashahhud.

And according to the Hanbalis, there is a difference in the prostration of recitation, whether he raises his hands at the first takbeer or not, and this implies that disagreement runs in something like that in the prostration of thanksgiving, and he performs the taslim and does not perform the tashahhud.

== See also ==
- Sujud
- Sujud Sahwi
- Sujud Tilawa
- Fiqh
- Salah
- Hanafism
- Hanbalism
- Malikism
- Shafiʽism
