= Islamic bioethics =

Guidance on issues related to human life

Islamic bioethics, or Islamic medical ethics, (Arabic: الأخلاق الطبية al-akhlaq al-tibbiyyah) refers to Islamic guidance on ethical or moral issues relating to medical and scientific fields, in particular, those dealing with human life.

== Background ==
In Islam, human life is regarded as an invaluable gift from God, and should therefore, be both respected and protected. This is evident in many Qur'anic verses or ayat, one of the most important being:

"if anyone slays a human being, unless it be [in punishment] for murder or spreading corruption on earth, it shall be as though he had slain all mankind; whereas, if anyone saves a life, it shall be as though he had saved the lives of all mankind."(Qur'an 5:32)

It is this verse, which has ultimately fueled the interest in Islamic bioethics and within it exist two basic principles which ensure that the sanctity of human life is preserved:

1. Saving a life is obligatory.
2. Unjustified taking of a life is classified as murder and, thus, forbidden.

Though Muslims recognize and maintain that Allah is the ultimate source of life (Qur'an 2:258), the Qur'an illustrates that God has instilled in them reason, free will, the ability to distinguish between what is morally acceptable and what is unacceptable (Qur'an 91:8) while also supplying the provisions of nature (Qur'an 45:13). With these things, Muslims are held responsible for maintaining health and preventing illness. In the event that illness occurs, Muslims are obliged to seek medical treatment in a manner which is Islamically appropriate and permissible.

Islamic bioethics is intimately linked to the broad ethical teachings of Qur'an and the tradition of the Prophet Muhammad. The Qur'an covers detail regarding human embryological development, which informs discourse on the ethical and the legal status of the embryo and fetus before birth.

== Basis ==
The fundamental basis of Islamic bioethics is that, all rulings and actions must fall into accordance with Islamic law (shari'a) and Islamic ethics. By evaluating bioethical issues from and ethical and legal standpoint, jurists can issue decrees or fatwas regarding the permissibility of the pertaining subject. Any rule that has not been explicitly outlined in the religious texts or formulated from them by jurists is referred to as bid'ah (innovation) and, therefore, is haram (impermissible). For this reason, all medical procedures and treatments, as well as conduct between patient and medical professional must be legitimized by the sources of Islamic law,

- Qur'an, its the holy book of all Muslims, whose basic impulse is to release the greatest amount possible of the creative moral impulse.
- Hadith or Sunnah is the Islamic law aspect based on the Prophet Muhammad's words or acts.
- Ijtihad
  - In Sunni Islam, ijtihad includes qiyas (analogy), ijma (consensus), maslaha (public welfare) and 'urf (customary practice)
  - In Shi'a Islam it is composed solely of al-'aql (reason)

Islamic bioethics is an extension of Shariah (Islamic law), which is itself based on two foundations: the Qur'an, the holy book of all Muslims, whose basic impulse is to release the greatest amount possible of the creative moral impulse; and the Sunna, which is the aspects of Islamic law based on the Prophet Muhammad's words or acts.

== Principles ==
Principles of bioethics in the Western world were first developed and outlined by two American philosophers and bioethicists, Tom Beauchamp and James F. Childress, in their book, Principles of Biomedical Ethics. The concept of bioethical principles has since been regarded as a purely "Western" innovation which is absent in the Islamic health care system. These bioethical principles: autonomy, beneficence, non-maleficence and justice have been legitimized by Muslims jurists as falling into the sphere of Islamic law and have also been supported by Qur'anic verses (Qur'an 3:104, 16:90 and 17:70). They have subsequently become the foundational spirit underlying the Oath of the Muslim Doctor and, thus, dictate the conduct between a Muslim physician and his or her patient.

The main principles of the Hippocratic Oath are acknowledged in Islamic bioethics. However, the invocation of multiple gods in the original version, and the exclusion of any god in later versions, have led Muslims to adopt the Oath of the Muslim Doctor.

== Authority ==
Formulations of rulings on bioethical issues in the Islamic context generally arise due to some form of deliberation between medical professionals and religious authority who have been recognized as most qualified individuals of location or time period. After being approached by health care officials, a member of the religious authority (mufti) may then consult the religious texts and determine whether or not a specific issue is obligatory (wajib/fard), recommended (mustahabb), neutral (mubah), discouraged (makruh) or forbidden (haram).

The Oath of the Muslim Doctor includes an undertaking to protect human life in all stages and under all circumstances, doing as much as possible to rescue it from death, malady, pain and anxiety. It includes a commitment to being an instrument of God's mercy and extending medical care without regard for whether the person is virtuous.

== History ==
Islam views the concept of health as an integration of mental, social and physical health, and not merely the absence of disease or disability. Islam links the health of the individual and society. Therefore, there are many hadiths of the Prophet, and in the writings of early Muslim doctors, Islam values health and what it encourages, and even values those who practice the medical profession. The Messenger of God, may God's prayers and peace be upon him, said: "A strong believer is better and more beloved to God than a weak believer, and there is good in each."

As health care and science have progressed over time, and the Muslim population has also increased to over one billion adherents over every continent on the globe, there have been increasingly prevalent circumstances for the evaluation of technological applications and bioethical issues to determine how they fit into the Islamic sphere. As a result, larger bodies of Islamic committees have been formed to address issues at hand. National Committees of Medical Ethics/Bioethics have been formed in many Islamic countries which work together with ulema to issue fatwas ensuring that neither the progress of medical science is hindered, nor the Islamic code of bioethics is jeopardized. The importance of Islamic law (sharia') is so heavily valued that each issue is looked at independently and subsequently deemed permissible or impermissible. Specific issues addressed in the modern scientific era include abortion, fertility treatments, family planning, euthanasia, genetic research, cloning, stem cell research among many other issues.

== Islamic Medical and Scientific Ethics Project ==
The Islamic Medical and Scientific Ethics (IMSE) Project is a multinational effort to produce a comprehensive collection of Islamic bioethics resources. Project staff members at two Georgetown University libraries, the Bioethics Research Library (Washington) and the School of Foreign Service-Qatar Library (Doha), have already compiled over 1,000 relevant written works into the IMSE Special Collection and have entered them into the searchable IMSE Database. The IMSE Project is funded by the Qatar National Research Fund (QNRF), a member of the Qatar Foundation for Education, Science and Community Development.

== Impact ==
The number of Muslims worldwide is estimated to be over 1.2 billion and their numbers are projected to increase. Even in Western countries, the number of Muslims is increasing; for example in Canada the number of Muslims had reached 550,000 by 1999 (Hamdani, 1999). Many Muslims incorporate their religion into almost every aspect of their lives. They invoke the name of God in daily conversation and live a closely examined life in relation to what is right or wrong behavior, drawing often from the Qur'an, the traditions of the Prophet, and subsequent determinations by Muslim jurists and scholars, believing that their actions are very much accountable (Qur'an,52:21, 4:85) and subject to ultimate judgement. Although individuals are given certain concessions on assuming the status of a patient, some try to live their lives in a Muslim way as patients, even when admitted to hospital. Greater understanding of Islamic bioethics would enhance the medical care of Muslims living in Western societies.

== Institutions ==
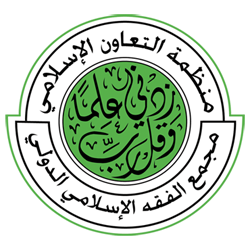

These entities are organizations that study emerging scientific and medical questions and issue collective fatwas, such as the International Islamic Fiqh Academy (IIFA) of the Organization of Islamic Cooperation (OIC), the Islamic Organization for Medical Sciences (IOMS), and various National Bioethics Committees. These groups are composed of scholars and experts who aim to harmonize modern science with the principles of Islamic ethics.

International Islamic Fiqh Academy (IIFA) – Established in January 1981 in Jeddah, the IIFA studies contemporary issues to propose solutions rooted in Islamic heritage while remaining open to evolving interpretations. Its notable resolutions include organ transplantation, assisted reproduction, and end-of-life care.

Islamic Organization for Medical Sciences (IOMS) – Headquartered in Kuwait, the IOMS works to align modern medicine with Islamic ethical principles, fostering dialogue between physicians, scientists, and religious scholars.

National Bioethics Committees – Found in countries such as Saudi Arabia, Egypt, Malaysia, and Morocco, these committees provide official ethical opinions and policy recommendations at the national level, ensuring that biomedical practices align with both ethical and religious considerations.

== See also ==
- Islamic environmentalism
