= Ahkam =

Islamic term meaning "rulings"

Ahkam (Arabic: أحكام, romanized: aḥkām, lit. 'rulings', plural of ḥukm, حُكْم) is an Islamic term with several meanings. In the Quran, the word hukm is variously used to mean arbitration, judgement, authority, or God's will. In the early Islamic period, the Kharijites gave it political connotations by declaring that they accept only the hukm of God (حُكْمُ اللّهِ). The word acquired new meanings in the course of Islamic history, being used to refer to worldly executive power or to a court decision.

Ahkam commonly refers to specific Quranic rules, or to the legal rulings/judgements/decisions derived using the methodology of fiqh. Sharia rulings fall into one of five categories known as "the five decisions" (al-aḥkām al-khamsa): mandatory (farḍ or wājib), recommended (mandūb or mustaḥabb), neutral/permissible (mubāḥ), disliked (makrūh), and forbidden (ḥarām). (Note: "The five categories` as such are as yet unknown to Shafi'i and his predecessors." Al-Shafi'i died in 204 AH (820 AD).)

== Five ruling types ==
In the principles of Islamic jurisprudence (Arabic: أصول الفقه, romanized: uṣūl al-fiqh), rulings governing actions fall into categories known as "the five rulings" (الأحكام الخمسة, al-aḥkām al-khamsa).

It is a sin or a crime to perform a forbidden action or not to perform a mandatory action. Avoiding reprehensible acts and performing recommended acts is held to be subject of reward in the afterlife, while allowed actions entail no judgement from God.

1. Obligatory (واجب, wājib or فرض, farḍ);
2. Recommended (مُسْتَحَبّ, mustaḥabb or المندوب, mandūb);
3. Neutral, that is, not involving God's judgment (مباح, mubāḥ);
4. Disliked or reprehensible (مكروه, makrūh);
5. Forbidden (حَرَام, ḥarām or محظور, maḥzūr).

Islamic jurists disagree on whether the term halal covers the first two, three, or four of these categories. The legal and moral verdict depends on whether the action is committed out of necessity (ḍarūra).

It is a sin or a crime to perform a forbidden action or not to perform a mandatory action. Reprehensible acts should be avoided, but they are not considered to be sinful or punishable in court. Avoiding reprehensible acts and performing recommended acts is held to be subject of reward in the afterlife, while allowed actions entail no judgement from God.

== Examples of each ruling ==
- Fard includes performing ritual prayer (salah), pilgrimage (hajj), proper Islamic funeral, and responding to the Islamic greeting (As-salamu alaykum).
- Mustahabb includes charity (sadaqah), shaving pubic hair and armpit hair, and As-salamu alaykum.
- Mubah includes eating and sleeping, and in property law, possessions without an owner.
- Makruh includes divorce, profanity, consuming garlic before going to mosque, and using excessive water for wudu.
- Haram includes zina, riba, shirk, and consuming blood or other forbidden substances.

== General considerations ==
The ḥukm shar‘ī (aḥkām) in its literal sense carries the meaning of a rule of Islamic law. Thus aḥkām (rules) is the plural form of ḥukm (rule), which means rule, command, the absolute, order, judgment, injunction, prescription, and decree. This rule could be a rule of any kind; it is to command one to delegate an order to another whether approval or disapproval. You could say that the moon is rising or the moon is not rising, or that fire burns.

Technically, it is considered a rule of Islamic law. Āmidī (d. 631/1234) defines adillah as the science of the proofs of fiqh and the indications that they provide with regard to the aḥkām of the sharī‘ah. The ḥukm shar‘ī consists of four fundamental elements. These elements are: the Ḥākim (Lawgiver), the maḥkūm alayh (the subject), the maḥkūm fīh (the act of the mukallaf), and the ḥukm (ruling).

== Emergency conditions ==
Religious precepts may be relaxed under certain extraordinary conditions. For example, although Muslims are required to fast during Ramadan, it is recommended for an ill man to break his fast if fasting will worsen his illness.

== Fatwa ==
Ahkam are similar to, but not the same as, a fatwa, which is a legal opinion or ruling issued by a qualified Islamic scholar (mufti) in response to a specific question or issue posed by an individual or community. Fatwas are based on the scholar's interpretation of Islamic sources and jurisprudential principles.

== See also ==
- Glossary of Islam
- Outline of Islam
- Index of Islam-related articles
- Supererogation, a western concept of virtue beyond ethical requirements
- Ordnung § Levels of piety, a similar typology in Anabaptist tradition
- Hukam, a Punjabi term derived from the Arabic term used in Sikhism
