= Recommended precaution =

Recommended precaution (Arabic: احتياط مستحب, romanized: Ihtiyat Mustahabb) is a fiqh term, prominently used by Shi'a marjas when giving fatwas. Ihtiyat is an action in such a way that includes certain knowledge to original Taklif. This term is considered from two views: the first is Usuli view and the other is juridical perspective (fiqh). In Usuli view, Ihtiyat is concerned with the principle of Ihtiyat while in juridical view, Ihtiyat dealt with Ijtihad, imitation and Qisas.

== Definition ==
There are many definitions for recommended precaution (Ihtiyat) in fiqh books and essays. Ihtiyat is observed where the man of jurisprudence does not say anything about fatwa and on the other hand jurists choose the way of imitation freely. Sometimes Ihtiyat is to action of Mokallaf (one who must act religious tasks) in such a way that the one find definite knowledge of original task. Ihtiyat sometimes is along with the repetition of action and sometimes with is not along with. There is also a difference between Ihtiyat in fatwa and giving fatwa in recommended precaution. Ihtiyat literally means preservation and keeping. Caution concerned primarily with action but Tavaqqof with creating rules.

== Types of ihtiyat ==
There are many divisions in Ihtiyat and its types. Ihtiyat divided in one hand into indispensable, mostahab and needed and in other hand in respect to action, not action and collection of action and not action.

== Ihtiyat in the Quran ==
Three groups of verses refer to indispensability of ihtiyat.

The first group refers to those verses which point to forbidding talking about something without having knowledge.

(O man), follow not that whereof thou hast no knowledge. Lo! the hearing and the sight and the heart - of each of these it will be asked.

— ^{[Quran 17:36]}

Then verily We shall question those unto whom (Our message) hath been sent, and verily We shall question the messengers

— ^{[Quran 7:33]}

The second group refers to those verses which point to forbidding the annihilation of human souls.

Spend your wealth for the cause of Allah, and be not cast by your own hands to ruin; and do good. Lo! Allah loveth the beneficent.

— ^{[Quran 2:195]}

The third group refers to those verses which point to order to taghwa (avoiding).

Spend your wealth for the cause of Allah, and be not cast by your own hands to ruin; and do good. Lo! Allah loveth the beneficent.

— ^{[Quran 3:102]}

So keep your duty to Allah as best ye can, and listen, and obey, and spend; that is better for your souls. And whoso is saved from his own greed, such are the successful.

— ^{[Quran 64:16]}

When Shi'a marjas give fatwas, they sometimes are not sure about the legality of some issues. In those cases, they recommend that the follower of the marja refrain from the act, in case it would indeed be haram. This is in contrast to the general term mustahabb, where people voluntarily do or refrain from doing actions that they know they are not obliged to.

As example:

It is a recommended precaution that even a child should not be made to sit in the toilet with its face or back facing Qibla. But if the child positions itself that way, it is not obligatory to divert it.
