= Principles of Islamic jurisprudence =

Usul al-fiqh Principles underpinning Islamic law

Principles of Islamic jurisprudence (Arabic: أصول الفقه, romanized: ʾUṣūl al-Fiqh) are traditional methodological principles used in Islamic jurisprudence (fiqh) for deriving the rulings of Islamic law (sharia).

Traditional theory of Islamic jurisprudence elaborates how the scriptures (Quran and hadith) should be interpreted from the standpoint of linguistics and rhetoric. It also comprises methods for establishing authenticity of hadith and for determining when the legal force of a scriptural passage is abrogated by a passage revealed at a later date. In addition to the Quran and hadith, the classical theory of Sunni jurisprudence recognizes secondary sources of law: juristic consensus (ijmaʿ) and analogical reasoning (qiyas). It therefore studies the application and limits of analogy, as well as the value and limits of consensus, along with other methodological principles, some of which are accepted by only certain legal schools (madhahib). This interpretive apparatus is brought together under the rubric of ijtihad, which refers to a jurist's exertion in an attempt to arrive at a ruling on a particular question. The theory of Twelver Shia jurisprudence parallels that of Sunni schools with some differences, such as recognition of reason (ʿaql) as a source of law in place of qiyās and extension of the notions of hadith and sunnah to include traditions of the imams.

== Etymology ==
Uṣūl al-fiqh is a genitive construction with two Arabic terms, uṣūl and fiqh. Uṣūl means roots or basis. Some says, Uṣūl, the plural form of Aṣl, means Rājih (preponderant). It also signifies Qā’idah (rules), which is the real-world application of the word. For example: "every sentence must contain a verb" is a rule of Grammar. Fiqh linguistically refers to knowledge, deep understanding or comprehension. In the context of Islamic law, it refers to traditional Islamic jurisprudence.

== Overview ==
Classical jurists held that human reason is a gift from God which should be exercised to its fullest capacity. However, they believed that use of reason alone is insufficient to distinguish right from wrong, and that rational argumentation must draw its content from the body of transcendental knowledge revealed in the Quran and through the sunnah of Muhammad.

=== Sources ===
==== Primary ====
===== Quran =====
In Islam, the Quran is considered to be the most sacred source of law. Classical jurists held its textual integrity to be beyond doubt on account of it having been handed down by many people in each generation, which is known as "recurrence" or "concurrent transmission" (tawātur). Only several hundred verses of the Quran have direct legal relevance, and they are concentrated in a few specific areas such as inheritance, though other passages have been used as a source for general principles whose legal ramifications were elaborated by other means.

===== Hadith =====
The body of hadith provides more detailed and practical legal guidance, but it was recognized early on that not all of them were authentic. Early Islamic scholars developed a methodology for evaluating their authenticity by assessing trustworthiness of the individuals listed in their transmission chains. These criteria narrowed down the vast corpus of prophetic traditions to several thousand "sound" hadiths, which were collected in several canonical compilations. The hadiths which enjoyed concurrent transmission were deemed unquestionably authentic; however, the vast majority of hadiths were handed down by only one or a few transmitters and were therefore seen to yield only probable knowledge. The uncertainty was further compounded by ambiguity of the language contained in some hadiths and Quranic passages. Disagreements on the relative merits and interpretation of the textual sources allowed legal scholars considerable leeway in formulating alternative rulings.

==== Secondary ====
===== Ijmā' =====
Consensus (ijma) could in principle elevate a ruling based on probable evidence to absolute certainty. This classical doctrine drew its authority from a series of hadiths stating that the Islamic community could never agree on an error. This form of consensus was technically defined as agreement of all competent jurists in any particular generation, acting as representatives of the community. However, the practical difficulty of obtaining and ascertaining such an agreement meant that it had little impact on legal development. A more pragmatic form of consensus, which could be determined by consulting works of prominent jurists, was used to confirm a ruling so that it could not be reopened for further discussion. The cases for which there was a consensus account for less than 1 percent of the body of classical jurisprudence.

===== Qiyās and 'aql =====
Analogical reasoning (qiyas) is used to derive a ruling for a situation not addressed in the scripture by analogy with a scripturally-based rule. In a classic example, the Quranic prohibition of drinking wine is extended to all intoxicating substances, on the basis of the "cause" (ʿilla) shared by these situations, which in this case is identified to be intoxication. Since the cause of a rule may not be apparent, its selection commonly occasioned controversy and extensive debate. Twelver Shia jurisprudence does not recognize the use of qiyās, but relies on reason (ʿaql) in its place.

=== Ijtihād ===
The classical process of ijtihād combined these generally recognized principles with other methods, which were not adopted by all legal schools, such as istiḥsān (juristic preference), istiṣlāḥ (consideration of public interest) and istiṣḥāb (presumption of continuity). A jurist who is qualified to practice ijtihad is known as a mujtahid. The use of independent reasoning to arrive at a ruling is contrasted with taqlīd (imitation), which refers to following the rulings of a mujtahid. By the beginning of the 10th century, development of Sunni jurisprudence prompted leading jurists to state that the main legal questions had been addressed and the scope of ijtihad was gradually restricted. From the 18th century on, leading Muslim reformers began calling for abandonment of taqlid and renewed emphasis on ijtihad, which they saw as a return to the vitality of early Islamic jurisprudence.

=== Decision types ===
Sharia rulings fall into one of five categories known as "the five rulings" (al-aḥkām al-khamsa): mandatory (farḍ or wājib), recommended (mandūb or mustaḥabb), neutral (mubāḥ), discouraged (makrūh), and forbidden (ḥarām). It is a sin or a crime to perform a forbidden action or not to perform a mandatory action. Reprehensible acts should be avoided, but they are not considered to be sinful or punishable in court. Avoiding reprehensible acts and performing recommended acts is held to be subject of reward in the afterlife, while neutral actions entail no judgement from God. Jurists disagree on whether the term ḥalāl covers the first three or the first four categories. The legal and moral verdict depends on whether the action is committed out of necessity (ḍarūra).

=== Maqasid and maslaha ===
Maqāṣid (aims or purposes) of sharia and maṣlaḥa (welfare or public interest) are two related classical doctrines which have come to play an increasingly prominent role in modern times. They were first clearly articulated by al-Ghazali (d. 1111 C.E/ 505 A.H), who argued that maslaha was God's general purpose in revealing the divine law, and that its specific aim was preservation of five essentials of human well-being: religion, life, intellect, offspring, and property. Although most classical-era jurists recognized maslaha and maqāsid as important legal principles, they held different views regarding the role they should play in Islamic law. Some jurists viewed them as auxiliary rationales constrained by scriptural sources and analogical reasoning. Others regarded them as an independent source of law, whose general principles could override specific inferences based on the letter of scripture. While the latter view was held by a minority of classical jurists, in modern times it came to be championed in different forms by prominent scholars who sought to adapt Islamic law to changing social conditions by drawing on the intellectual heritage of traditional jurisprudence. These scholars expanded the inventory of maqāsid to include such aims of sharia as reform and women's rights (Rashid Rida); justice and freedom (Mohammed al-Ghazali); and human dignity and rights (Yusuf al-Qaradawi).

== Schools of law ==
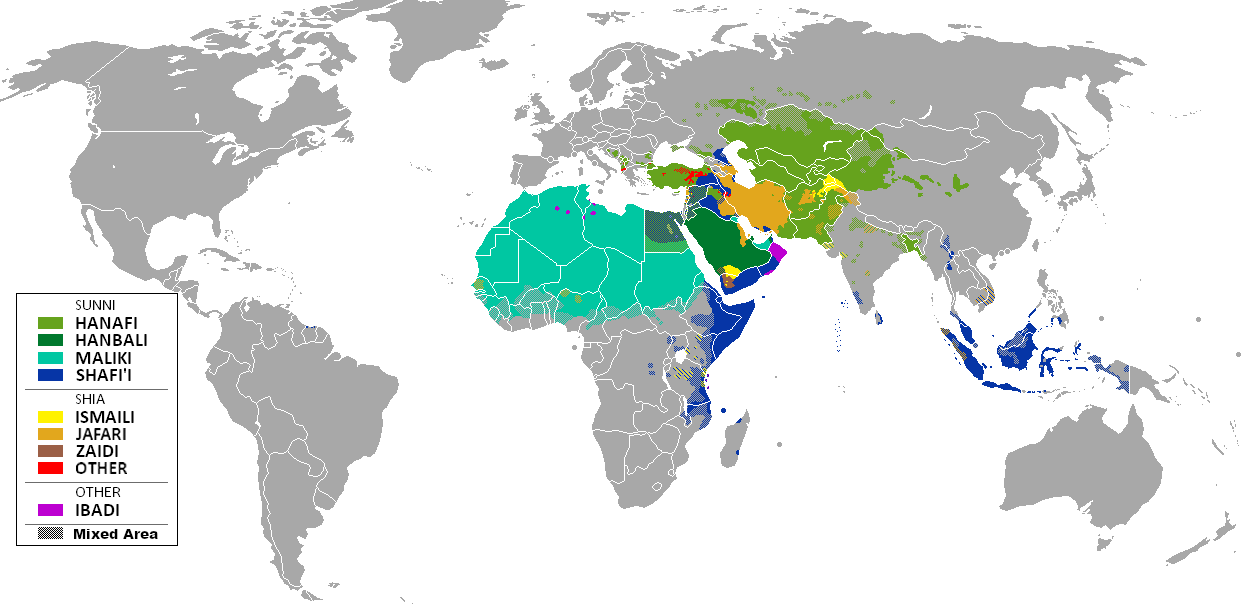
Distribution of Sunni, Shia and Ibadi denominations

The main Sunni schools of law (madhhabs) are the Hanafi, Hanbali, Maliki and Shafi'i madhhabs. They grew out of differences of opinion and methodology between the sahāba and each generation of students after them. Initially there were hundreds of schools of thought which eventually contracted into the prominent four. These four schools recognize each other's validity and they have interacted in legal debate over the centuries. Rulings of these schools are followed across the Muslim world without exclusive regional restrictions, but they each came to dominate in different parts of the world. For example, the Maliki school is predominant in North and West Africa; the Hanafi school in South and Central Asia; the Shafi'i school in Lower Egypt, East Africa, and Southeast Asia; and the Hanbali school in North and Central Arabia.

The first centuries of Islam also witnessed a number of short-lived Sunni madhhabs. The Zahiri school, which is commonly identified as extinct, continues to exert influence over legal thought. The development of Shia legal schools occurred along the lines of theological differences and resulted in formation of the Twelver, Zaidi and Ismaili madhhabs, whose differences from Sunni legal schools are roughly of the same order as the differences among Sunni schools. The Ibadi legal school, distinct from Sunni and Shia madhhabs, is predominant in Oman.

The transformations of Islamic legal institutions in the modern era have had profound implications for the madhhab system. Legal practice in most of the Muslim world has come to be controlled by government policy and state law, so that the influence of the madhhabs beyond personal ritual practice depends on the status accorded to them within the national legal system. State law codification commonly used the methods of takhayyur (selection of rulings without restriction to a particular madhhab) and talfiq (combining parts of different rulings on the same question). Legal professionals trained in modern law schools have largely replaced traditional ulema as interpreters of the resulting laws. Global Islamic movements have at times drawn on different madhhabs and at other times placed greater focus on the scriptural sources rather than classical jurisprudence. The Hanbali school, with its particularly strict adherence to the Quran and hadith, has inspired conservative currents of direct scriptural interpretation by the Salafi and Wahhabi movements.

Liberal interpretations of Islamic law include Indonesian ulema and Islamic scholars residing in Muslim-minority countries.

== Sunni principles ==
Islamic scholar Sayyid Rashid Rida (1865 – 1935 C.E) lists the four basic principles of Islamic law, agreed upon by all Sunni Muslims:

"the [well-known] sources of legislation in Islam are four: the Qur'an, the Sunnah, the consensus of the ummah and ijtihad undertaken by competent jurists"

=== The contribution of al-Shafi'i ===
Al-Shafi'i documented a systematized set of principles, developing a cohesive procedure for legal derivation of verdicts. His approach contrasted with the Hanafite methodology that determined the sources from the sayings and rulings of the companions and successors. Furthermore, he raised the Sunnah to a place of prominence and restricted its legal use. According to Shafi'i, only practices directly passed down from Muhammad were valid, eliminating the legitimacy of practices of Muhammad's followers. Prior to Shafi'i, legal reasoning included personal reasoning thus suffering from inconsistency. Shafi'i is probably best known for writing al-Risala, a prime example of applying logic and order to Islamic jurisprudence.

=== Evolution of methods ===
Between Shāfi'i's Al-Risala and the next attested works of Usul al-Fiqh is a gap of several hundred years. These later works were significantly different from Shafi'is book, likely due to the insertion of Mu'tazilite and Ash'arite theology into works of jurisprudence. The difference between Shafi'i's work and these later works – in terms of both content and the large chronological gap between which they were all composed – is so great that modern scholarship has questioned the status of Shafi'i as the founder of Islamic jurisprudence.

Indeed, even the division of the sources of Sunni law into four – Qur'an, prophetic tradition, consensus and analogical reason – was not present in Shafi'is books at all, despite Muslim scholarship generally attributing this division to him. According to Qadi al-Nu'man, one of the earliest jurists to write about usul after Shafi'i did – perhaps during Shafi'is lifetime – was Abū 'Ubaid al-Qāsim b. Sallām, who actually considered the sources of law to consist of only three – the Qur'an, the prophetic tradition, and consensus consisting of either scholarly consensus or consensus of the early generations. This division into four sources is most often attributed to later jurists upon whose work most Sunni jurisprudence has been modeled such as Baqillani and Abd al-Jabbar ibn Ahmad, of the Ash'arite and Mu'tazilite schools respectively. Thus, the four main sources often attributed to Shafi'i evolved into popular usage long after his death.

=== Application of sources ===
Even after this evolution, there are still some disputes among Sunni jurists regarding these four sources and their application. Malik ibn Anas, Ahmad ibn Hanbal and in particular Dawud al-Zahiri rejected all forms of analogical reason in authentic narrations from them, yet the later Malikites and Hanbalites – and in some cases, even Zahirites – gravitated toward the acceptance of varying levels of analogical reason already accepted by Shafi'ites and Hanafites. Malik and Abu Hanifa both accepted pure reason as a source of law; Ahmad and Shafi'i did not, and Shafi'i was especially hostile to juristic preference as implemented by Abu Hanifa, yet pure reason later found its way into all Sunni schools of law.

The question of consensus has evolved considerably. Abu Hanifa, Ahmad and Zahiri only accepted the consensus of the first generation of Muslims, while Malik was willing to accept the consensus of the first generation in general or the consensus of later generations within the community of Medina. Shafi'i insinuated that consensus was not practically possible to confirm. Later scholars of all schools eventually followed the views of Al-Ghazali and Ibn Taymiyyah in expanding the definition of accepted consensus to include scholarly consensus and silent consensus as well.

== Shia principles ==
In Shi'a legal theory, analogical reason is not recognised as a source of law; pure reason is, however. Shi'ites may differ in the exact application of principles depending on whether they follow the Ja'fari, Ismaili or Zaidi subdivisions of Shi'ism.

=== Ja'fari principles ===
There are two interpretations of what constitutes sources of law among jurists of the Ja'fari school.

- According to the Akhbari view, the only sources of law are the Quran and the Hadith, and any case not explicitly covered by one of these must be regarded as not having been provided for.
- According to the majority Usuli view, it is legitimate to seek general principles by induction, to provide for cases not expressly provided for. This process is known as ijtihad, and the intellect is recognised as a source of law. It differs from the Sunni qiyas in that it does not simply extend existing laws on a test of factual resemblance: it is necessary to formulate a general principle that can be rationally supported.

Javadi Amoli wrote about source of revelation in Shiism:

1. The most important source in Shiite law is the Quran itself, which interprets itself
2. The other source is the tradition of the "infallibles" (the family of Muhammad), according to the successive tradition (Saqalain) passed down by the family of Muhammad as well as according to the Quran itself: to accept one without the other is equivalent to rejecting both of them.
3. A third source is theoretical wisdom where it is impossible to conceive the contrary, which proves the existence of God and the necessity of his unity, eternity, pre-existence, power, will and other exalted attributes: this cannot be denied with any verse.
4. Although we cannot impose science upon the Quran, we can use verified scientific, experimental, historical, artistic, logical and other evidence to interpret the subject addressed in a given passage, rather than through another verse.

In doubtful cases the law is often derived not from substantive principles induced from existing rules, but from procedural presumptions (usul 'amaliyyah) concerning factual probability. An example is the presumption of continuity: if one knows that a given state of affairs, such as ritual purity, existed at some point in the past but one has no evidence one way or the other whether it exists now, one can presume that the situation has not changed.

The analysis of probability forms a large part of the Shiite science of usul al-fiqh, and was developed by Muhammad Baqir Behbahani (1706–1792) and Shaykh Murtada al-Ansari (died 1864). The only primary text on Shi'ite principles of jurisprudence in English is the translation of Muhammad Baqir as-Sadr's Durus fi 'Ilm al-'Usul.

==== Parts of the Shiite Uṣūl al-Fiqh ====
Discussions of this science are presented in various parts in the works of uṣūl al-fiqh. However, the best division is presented by al-Muhaqqiq al-Isfahani (d. 1940) in his last course of teaching (as narrated by his great student Muhammad Rida al-Muzaffar in his Uṣūl al-Fiqh, p. 11) according to which all uṣūlī topics are discussed in the four following parts: Discussions of "terms," of "intellectual implications," of "the authority," and of "practical principles." Discussions of terms deal with denotations and appearances of terms from a general aspect, such as appearance of the imperative in the obligation, that of the prohibition in the unlawfulness, and the like. Discussions of intellectual implications survey implications of precepts even though such precepts may not be inferred from terms, such as discussing truthfulness of mutual implication of intellectual judgments and juristic precepts, of obligation of something necessitating obligation of its preliminaries (known as "the problem of preliminary of the mandatory act"), of obligation of something necessitating unlawfulness of its opposite (known as "the problem of the opposite"), of possibility of conjunction of the command and the prohibition, and so on. Discussions of the authority investigate whether some specific thing is juristically treated as a proof; for instance, whether report of a single transmitter, appearances, appearances of the Quran, Sunna, consensus, intellect, and the like are authoritative proofs. Discussions of practical principles deal with what the jurist refers to when he cannot find a persuasive proof, such as the principle of clearance from obligation, that of precaution, and so forth.

=== Ismaili principles ===
Most early Ismaili works within the field of the principles of jurisprudence were actually responses to Sunni works on the topic. Qadi al-Nu'man's Differences Among the Schools of Law is most likely the first of such written responses.

== Jurists (usulis) ==
=== Primary ===
- Ja'far al-Sadiq
- Abu Hanifa
- Al-Shafi'i
- Malik ibn Anas
- Ahmad ibn Hanbal
- Al-Amidi
- Al-Ghazali
- Al-Sarakhsi
- Al-Isnawi
- Abu Yusuf
- Shaybani
- Al-Qurtubi
- Al-Layth ibn Sa'd
- Sufyan ibn ʽUyaynah
- Abdullah ibn Mubarak
- Sufyan al-Thawri

=== Contemporary ===
- Sheikh Abdur Rahman Nasir as sathi
- Sheikh Adam Al ethiyopie

== Books ==
- Uddat al-Usul
- Jam' al-Jawami'
- Kitab al-Umm
- Al-Risala
- Al-mustasfa min 'ilm al-usul

== See also ==
- Usul al-Din
- Sources of Islamic law
- Fiqh
- Seventy-three Sects (Hadith)

== Bibliography ==
- Brown, Jonathan A. C. (2009). "Maṣlaḥah". In John L. Esposito (ed.). The Oxford Encyclopedia of the Islamic World. Oxford: Oxford University Press. Archived from the original on October 11, 2017.
- Calder, Norman (2009). "Law. Legal Thought and Jurisprudence". In John L. Esposito (ed.). The Oxford Encyclopedia of the Islamic World. Oxford: Oxford University Press. Archived from the original on November 21, 2008.
- Dahlén, Ashk (2003), Islamic Law, Epistemology and Modernity. Legal Philosophy in Contemporary Iran, New York: Routledge, ISBN 9780415945295
- Duderija, Adis (2014). Adis Duderija (ed.). Contemporary Muslim Reformist Thought and Maqāṣid cum Maṣlaḥa Approaches to Islamic Law: An Introduction. Vol. Maqasid al-Shari'a and Contemporary Reformist Muslim Thought: An Examination. Springer.
- Gleave, R.M. (2012). "Maḳāṣid al-Sharīʿa". In P. Bearman; Th. Bianquis; C.E. Bosworth; E. van Donzel; W.P. Heinrichs (eds.). Encyclopaedia of Islam (2nd ed.). Brill. doi:10.1163/1573-3912_islam_SIM_8809.
- Glenn, H. Patrick (2014). Legal Traditions of the World – Sustainable Diversity in Law (5th edition), Oxford University Press, ISBN 978-0199669837.
- Hallaq, Wael B. (2009). An Introduction to Islamic Law. Cambridge University Press.
- Hussin, Iza (2014). "Sunni Schools of Jurisprudence". In Emad El-Din Shahin (ed.). The Oxford Encyclopedia of Islam and Politics. Oxford University Press. doi:10.1093/acref:oiso/9780199739356.001.0001. ISBN 9780199739356.
- Kamali, Mohammad Hashim (1999). John Esposito (ed.). Law and Society. Vol. The Oxford History of Islam. Oxford University Press (Kindle edition).
- Opwis, Felicitas (2007). Abbas Amanat; Frank Griffel (eds.). Islamic Law and Legal Change: The Concept of Maslaha in Classical and Contemporary Legal Theory. Vol. Shari'a: Islamic Law in the Contemporary Context (Kindle ed.). Stanford University Press.
- Rabb, Intisar A. (2009). "Law. Civil Law & Courts". In John L. Esposito (ed.). The Oxford Encyclopedia of the Islamic World. Oxford: Oxford University Press. Archived from the original on November 21, 2008.
- Rabb, Intisar A. (2009b). "Fiqh". In John L. Esposito (ed.). The Oxford Encyclopedia of the Islamic World. Oxford: Oxford University Press. doi:10.1093/acref/9780195305135.001.0001. ISBN 9780195305135.
- Rabb, Intisar A. (2009c). "Ijtihād". In John L. Esposito (ed.). The Oxford Encyclopedia of the Islamic World. Oxford: Oxford University Press. doi:10.1093/acref/9780195305135.001.0001. ISBN 9780195305135.
- Schneider, Irene (2014). "Fiqh". In Emad El-Din Shahin (ed.). The Oxford Encyclopedia of Islam and Politics. Oxford University Press. doi:10.1093/acref:oiso/9780199739356.001.0001. ISBN 9780199739356.
- Vikør, Knut S. (2014). "Sharīʿah". In Emad El-Din Shahin (ed.). The Oxford Encyclopedia of Islam and Politics. Oxford University Press. Archived from the original on 2 February 2017.
- Ziadeh, Farhat J. (2009). "Uṣūl al-fiqh". In John L. Esposito (ed.). The Oxford Encyclopedia of the Islamic World. Oxford: Oxford University Press. doi:10.1093/acref/9780195305135.001.0001. ISBN 9780195305135.
- Ziadeh, Farhat J. (2009b). "Law. Sunnī Schools of Law". In John L. Esposito (ed.). The Oxford Encyclopedia of the Islamic World. Oxford: Oxford University Press. Archived from the original on November 21, 2008.
