= Ghusl =

Islamic ritual purification

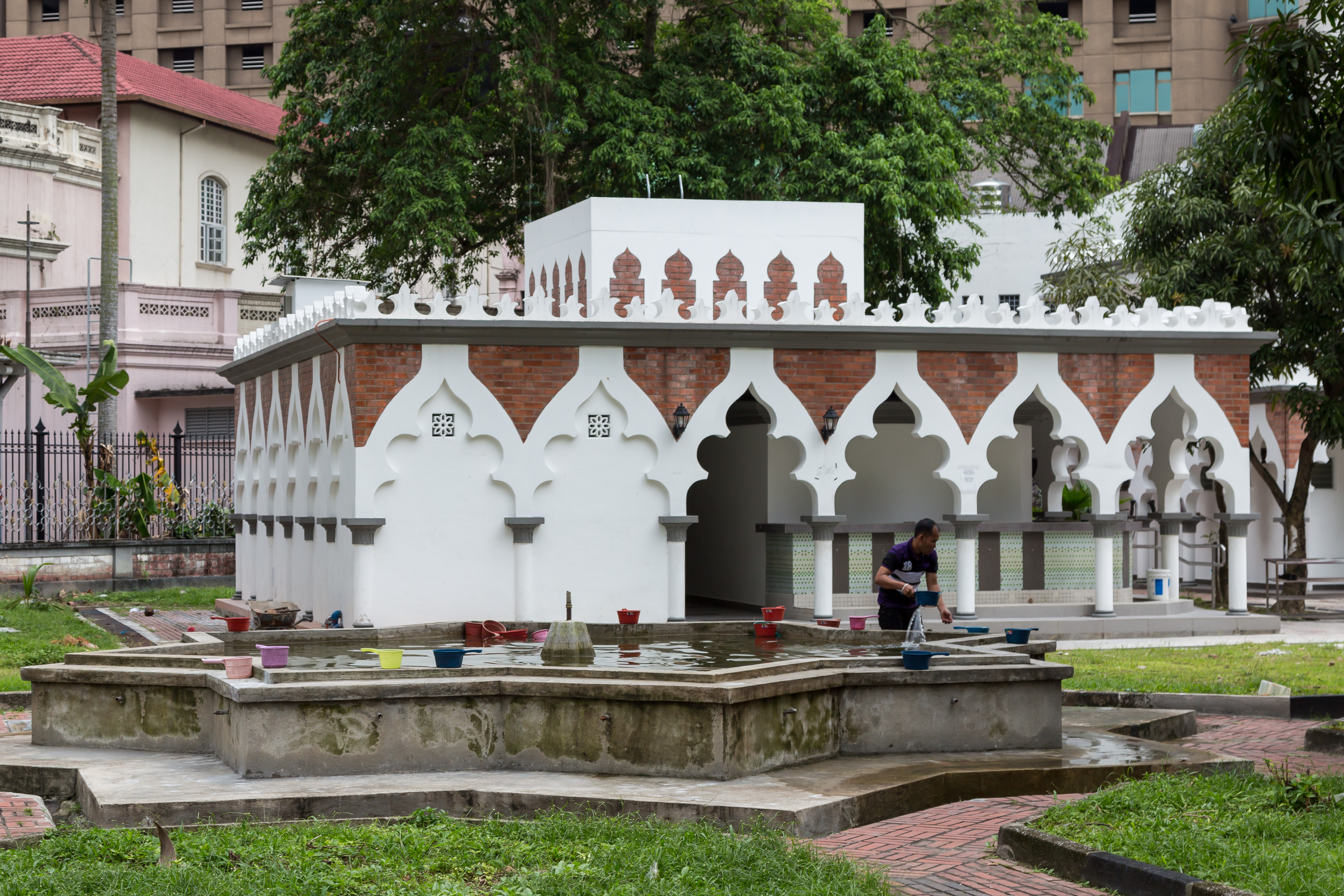
Wudu and ghusl facilities (in background) at Jamek Mosque in Kuala Lumpur, Malaysia

Ghusl (Arabic: غسل ġusl, IPA: [ˈɣʊsl]) is an Arabic term meaning full-body ritual purification, or ritual bath, which is mandatory before the performance of various Islamic activities and prayers. For any Muslim, it is performed after sexual intercourse (i.e. it is fardh), before Friday prayer and prayers for Islamic holidays, before entering the ihram in preparation for Hajj, after having lost consciousness, and after formally converting to Islam. Sunni Muslims also perform the ablution before Salat al-Tawba "Prayer of Repentance".

Ghusl is often translated as "full ablution", as opposed to the "partial ablution" or wudu وضوء that Muslims perform after lesser impurities such as urination, defecation, flatulence, deep sleep, and light bleeding (depending on the madhhab).

== Types by purpose ==
Ghusl becomes obligatory for seven causes, and the ghusl for each of these different causes has different names:

- Ghusl Janabat is ghusl performed after sexual intercourse/ejaculation, when someone becomes junub, or ritually impure.
- Ghusl Hayd is following menstruation.
- Ghusl Nifas is following lochia (vaginal discharge after giving birth, which can occur for up to 6 weeks after birth).
- Ghusl Mayyit is ghusl performed on a dead Muslim.

In some denominations, two further categories obligate ghusl:

- Ghusl Istihada is for irregular bleeding (in women).
- Ghusl Mas-hil Mayyit becomes obligatory if one directly touches a dead body.

Ghusl also becomes obligatory following a vow or oath to perform it.

== Water requirements ==
Similar to wudu, some water sources are permissible for use for ghusl whereas some water sources are not.

Ghusl requires clean, odourless water that has not been used for a previous ritual and begins with the declaration of the intention of purity and worship.

Permissible water sources include:

- Rainwater
- Well water
- Spring, sea, or river water
- Water of melting ice
- Water of a big tank or pond

Ghusl is not allowed with unclean or impure water or water extracted from fruit and trees.

== The acts of ghusl ==
The Quranic mandate exhorts believers not to approach praying while drowsy until after washing the entire body. The same requirement is applied to those who have had contact with a woman, are traveling, ill, or just used the toilet. This last group, if they can't find water, can wipe their hands and faces with clean dirt.

The phrase translated as 'intercourse' in this verse has been interpreted by Hanafi scholars to mean sexual contact, while Shafi'i scholars interpret it to mean both physical and sexual contact. Hence, the Hanafi school of thought does not require one to take wudu if there is non-sexual contact with a member of the opposite sex, while the Shafi'i school of thought does require wudu before salah and so on.

=== Farā'id of Ghusl (Hanafi Guidelines) ===
There are three farḍ (obligatory) acts. If one of these acts is omitted, it must be returned to and completed before the remaining acts.

1. Rinsing the inner mouth (gargle with water).
2. Irrigate nose (rinse inside of nose) with water and blowout.
3. Washing the entire body.

=== Sunnah of Ghusl ===
An optional alternate method as demonstrated by the Islamic prophet, Muhammad:

1. Washing both hands up to the elbows.
2. Wash the private parts and remove dirt or filth from the body (using your left hand).
3. Perform wudu (ablution).
4. Pour water over the head three times, and rub the hair so that the water reaches the roots of the hair.
5. Then wash the body, ensuring the water reaches all parts, starting with the right side of the body and then the left, and rubbing it with the hands so that the water reaches the entire body.

In Islam, ghusl requires the washing of the entire body. There are some differences in details between the Sunni and the Shia schools of thought.

== Sunni school of thought ==
1. Start by making niyyah (intention) to perform ghusl, say the Bismillah and make the intention to cleanse yourself of impurities.
2. Wash the right hand up to and including the wrist (and between the fingers) three times and make sure to clean thoroughly, then similarly for the left hand.
3. Wash the private parts and remove dirt or filth from the body (using your left hand).
4. Perform wudu as if for salah. Ensure that the mouth and nostrils are thoroughly rinsed one time. If sitting on a stool or stone while bathing then the feet should also be washed when performing Wudu. But if sitting in a muddy place, feet should not be washed at this stage.
5. Water should be poured over the head three times so that it flows all over the body, ensuring that the roots of hairs and parts not easily reached by water such as the back of the knees are washed thoroughly.
6. Pour water over both shoulders three times each (starting from the right shoulder). Hands should be passed all over the body when water is poured so that no part of the body is left dry.
7. Move to a clean spot and wash the feet if not washed during Wudu.
8. As at the end of Wudu, it is recommended to recite the shahada.

If, after ghusl, one recalls that a certain portion of the body is left dry, it is not necessary to repeat the Ghusl, but merely wash the dry portion. It is not sufficient to pass a wet hand over the dry place. If one has forgotten to rinse the mouth or the nostrils, these too could be rinsed when recalled after Ghusl has been performed. Ghusl should be made in a place of total privacy.

In another hadith, Ibn Abbas stated that Maymunah bint al-Harith said that Muhammad was given a towel after Ghusl, but he shook off the water instead of rubbing his body with it. In addition, Ibn Abbas recorded, on the authority of his mother's sister, that the Messenger of Allah returned the towel she gave him after Ghusl, instead of using it.

=== Makruh things in the act of Ghusl ===
Things that are makruh in ghusl.

1. To perform ghusl at a place where anybody is watching you.
2. Performing naked ghusl while facing towards the Kaaba.
3. Talking in ghusl.
4. Doing ghusl opposite to farad ghusl.
5. Reciting dua other than Bismillah.

== Shia school of thought ==
There are two methods of performing ghusl. One is known as ghusl tartibi, and the other is known as ghusl irtimasi.

=== Ghusl tartibih ===
"Ghusl tartibi" means an ordinal bath, performed in three stages.

After washing away the najasat (e.g., semen or blood) from the body and after niyyat, the body has to be washed in three stages: head down to the neck; then the right side of the body from the shoulder down to the foot; then the left side of the body.

Each part should be washed thoroughly in such a way that the water reaches the skin. Special care should be taken while washing the head; the hair should be combed (e.g., with your fingers) so that water reaches the hair-roots. While washing the right side of the body, some part of the left side must be washed too, and vice versa.

=== Ghusl irtimasi ===
"Ghusl irtimasi" means a bath involving immersion of the whole body in the water. It can only be done in a body of water, e.g., a pool, river, lake or sea. After washing away the semen or blood from the body and after niyyat, the whole body should be completely immersed in the water all at once, not gradually. One has to make sure that the water reaches all parts of the body, including hair and the skin under it.

Ghusl tartibi is preferred over ghusl irtimasi.

=== Recommendable acts of ghusl ===
What has been mentioned above are the wajib acts of ghusl; there are things which are recommendable (mustahabb, sunnat) during the ghusl. These recommendable acts are five:

1. Gargling three times and washing the nose three times.
2. Performing the acts of wudu before the actual washing.
3. Wiping the hands on the whole body to ensure that every part has been thoroughly washed.
4. Combing the hair with the fingers to ensure that the water reaches the hair-roots.
5. (For men) Doing istibra' (urinating) before ghusl janabat. If a liquid comes out of a man's penis after completing the ghusl, and he doubts whether it is semen or urine, he does not need to repeat the ghusl as long as he also urinated before the ghusl. If he did not urinate before the ghusl, then he must repeat the process. This rule of istibra' applies only to men.

== See also ==
- Mikvah
- Tamasha, the Mandaean full body ritual purification
- Wudu
- Misogi
