= Istishab =

Presumption of continuity in Islamic jurisprudence

Istiṣḥāb (Arabic: استصحاب transl. continuity) is an Islamic term used in the jurisprudence to denote the principle of the presumption of continuity. It is derived from an Arabic word suhbah meaning accompany. It is one of the fundamental principles of the legal deduction that presumes the continuation of a fact. It is based on probability and can be applied in the absence of other proofs.

Istishab, an initiative of ash-Shafii, is the rationalistic principle of extracting a legal solution according to which changes are not considered to occur until clear signs of these changes are apparent. It serves as the basis for many legal rulings such as the presumption of innocence—the person is regarded as innocent unless proven guilty. Malik ibn Anas and ash-Shafii regarded it to be a proof until it is contradicted. Several classical jurists differed over this principle with some Hanafi jurists refusing to regard it as an evidence. It is now widely employed by the contemporary scholars.

== Definition ==
Ibn al-Qayyim defined it as

The continuation of what is established or the negation of what does not exist, i.e. it is the judgement, negative or positive, continues until there is evidence of a change of state. This continuance is not proved by positive evidence, but by the absence of the existence of new evidence.

Al-Qarafi expressed it as the validity of the former state in the following words.

Istishab means the belief that the past or present matter must be assumed to remain as it is in the present or future.

Examples of istishab in Islamic jurisprudence include:

- The basic assumption regarding a virgin woman is the continuity of virginity until evidence establishes otherwise.
- The basic assumption regarding ownership is that ownership remains with the owner until proof shows it has been transferred.
- The basic assumption regarding water is that it is pure until evidence proves otherwise.

== Types ==
Istishab is divided into several types. The majority of the scholars agree upon three types.

=== Presumption of the original absence ===
It is the absence of any Shariah norms on an adult Muslim, until their legitimacy is established. An example is the absence of the mandatory sixth prayer for a Muslim, the presumption of the person's innocence of a crime, etc. Islamic theologians are unanimous regarding the validity of this type.

=== Basis in everyday life is permissibility ===
The overwhelming majority of jurists believe that the basis in useful everyday things is permissibility and in harmful things is prohibition. For example, a certain type of food is allowed until a Sharia argument is established, proving its prohibition.

=== Presumption of existence before evidence is available ===
If there are Sharia texts with respect to any norm, backed up by the Istishab, then statements about the abolition of this rule will not be accepted until they are backed up by evidence. An example is the continued ownership of property rights. The application to terminate property will not be accepted until evidence is submitted supporting these statements. Another example is the validity of the ablution, which will not invalidated on the mere basis of doubt.
