= Minimal decency =

Ethical requirement in the moral philosophy of Immanuel Kant

Minimal decency is an ethical requirement according to the moral philosophy of Immanuel Kant.

The term refers to the minimum requirement of kindness obliged by Kantian ethics; those actions which go beyond the call of duty are considered supererogation. People need not engage in supererogation in order to be responsible moral agents. The distinction between minimal decency (an ethical obligation) and supererogation helps moral agents understand and protect their own and each other's rational autonomy.
