= Uddat al-Usul =

Uddat al-Usul (Arabic: عده الاصول, romanized: ‘Uddat al-Uṣūl) is a book on principles of jurisprudence (usul al-fiqh), written by Shaykh Tusi. Shaykh Tusi knows the book as the most complete book among Osuli books.

== Characters ==
Uddat al-Usul contains some preliminary parts and 92 chapters, divided over two volumes. According to Tusi, Uddat al-Usul is the first complete book about the principles of Islamic jurisprudence. Also this book is not concerned with theological and logical problems and properly concerned to principles of fiqh. Tusi, contrary to his teachers such as Sayyed Murtaza, tried to report some narrations of Shia Imams. Most of Shaykh Mufid's sayings in principles could be found in Uddat al-Usul.

== See also ==
- Kitab Tahdhib al-Ahkam
- Kitab al-Istibsar
