= Repentance in Islam =

Islamic concept of repenting to God (Allah)

Tawba (Note: alternatively spelled as tawbah or taubah.) (Arabic: توبة) is the Islamic concept of repenting to God due to performing any sins and misdeeds. It is a direct matter between a person and God, so there is no intercession. There is no original sin in Islam. It is the act of leaving what God has prohibited and returning to what he has commanded. The word denotes the act of being repentant for one's misdeeds, atoning for those misdeeds, and having a strong determination to forsake those misdeeds (remorse, resolution, and repentance). If someone sins against another person, restitution is required.

== Etymology ==
The literal meaning of the Arabic word tawba is "to return" and is repeated in the Qur'an and hadith (sayings of the Islamic prophet Muhammad). In the context of Islam, it means to turn or to retreat from past sinful and evil activities, and to firmly resolve to abstain from them in future. In Quran 66:8, the word tawba has been associated with the word نصوح (nasūh) which means "to make pure or sincere". Thus, tawba signifies sincere and faithful repentance, free from pretense and hypocrisy.

== In Islamic scripture ==
=== Quran ===
In the Quran, there is a complete surah (chapter) titled At-Tawba, which means "The Repentance". As with other topics, the act of atoning (for one's misdeeds) and seeking God's forgiveness has also been discussed in the Qur’an, and given much importance. For those believers who have wronged themselves, the Qur'an asks them to become repentant, seek Allah's forgiveness, and make a sincere tawba. It assures them that if they do this, God will forgive them, and exonerate them from their misdeeds:

...Turn to Allah in repentance all together, O believers, so that you may be successful.

— Surah An-Nur 24:31

O believers! Turn to Allah in sincere repentance, so your Lord may absolve you of your sins and admit you into Gardens, under which rivers flow, ...

— Surah At-Tahrim 66:8

...Surely Allah loves those who always turn to Him in repentance and those who purify themselves."

— Surah Al-Baqara 2:222

Allah only accepts the repentance of those who commit evil ignorantly ˹or recklessly˺ then repent soon after—Allah will pardon them. And Allah is All-Knowing, All-Wise.
However, repentance is not accepted from those who knowingly persist in sin until they start dying, and then cry, "Now I repent!" nor those who die as disbelievers. For them We have prepared a painful punishment.

— Surah An-Nisa 04:17-18

The Qur'an also addresses the disbelievers and urges them to turn to God, upon which God promises to pardon them:

Their punishment will be multiplied on the Day of Judgment, and they will remain in it forever, in disgrace.
As for those who repent, believe, and do good deeds, they are the ones whose evil deeds Allah will change into good deeds. For Allah is All-Forgiving, Most Merciful.
And whoever repents and does good has truly turned to Allah properly.

— Surah Al-Furqan 25:69–71

=== Sunnah ===
Like Quran, the hadith also mentions and stresses the importance of tawba:

- In Sunan al-Tirmidhi, a Hadith is narrated:
  Allah's apostle said, "Every son of Adam sins, the best of the sinners are those who repent."
  — Sunan al-Tirmidhi, Hadith no. 2499
- In Sunan Ibn Majah It was narrated that
  Ibn Ma’qil said: “I entered with my father upon ‘Abdullah, and I heard him say: ‘The messenger of Allah (ﷺ) said: “Regret is repentance.” My father said: ‘Did you hear the Prophet (ﷺ) say: “Regret is repentance?” He said: ‘Yes.’”
  — Ibn Majah, 4252 (Hasan (Darus Salam: opined by Zubayr 'Ali Za'i)
- Jami` at-Tirmidhi (In-book reference : Book 40, Hadith 20). Narrated Abu Hurairah: Mohammed (ﷺ) said: "The adulterer is not a believer while he is committing adultery, and the thief is not a believer while he is stealing, but there is a chance for repentance; (if he repents, Allah will accept the repentance)."
- In Sahih al-Bukhari, Anas ibn Malik narrates:

Allah's Apostle said, "Allah is more pleased with the repentance of His slave than anyone of you is pleased with finding his camel which he had lost in the desert."

— Sahih al-Bukhari, 8:75:321

- In Sahih Muslim, Abu Ayyub al-Ansari and Abu Huraira narrate:

Allah's apostle said,"By Him in Whose Hand is my life, if you were not to commit sin, Allah would sweep you out of existence and He would replace (you by) those people who would commit sin and seek forgiveness from Allah, and He would have pardoned them."

— Sahih Muslim, 37:6621

- In Sahih Bukhari, Abu Said Al-Khudri narrates:

The Prophet said, "Amongst the men of Bani Israel there was a man who had murdered ninety-nine people. Then he set out asking (whether his repentance could be accepted or not). He came upon a monk and asked him if his repentance could be accepted. The monk replied in the negative and so the man killed him. He kept on asking till a man advised to go to such and such village. (So he left for it) but death overtook him on the way. While dying, he turned his chest towards that village (where he had hoped his repentance would be accepted), and so the angels of mercy and the angels of punishment quarrelled amongst themselves regarding him. Allah ordered the village (towards which he was going) to come closer to him, and ordered the village (whence he had come), to go far away, and then He ordered the angels to measure the distances between his body and the two villages. So he was found to be one span closer to the village (he was going to). So he was forgiven."

— Sahih Bukhari 3470

- In Sahih al-Bukhari and Sahih Muslim narrated Abdullah ibn Masud,

A man kissed a woman (unlawfully) and then went to the prophet and informed him. Allah revealed: "And offer prayers perfectly At the two ends of the day And in some hours of the night (i.e. the five compulsory prayers). Verily! good deeds remove (annul) the evil deeds (small sins)." (11:114). The man asked Allah's messenger, "Is it for me?" He said, "It is for all my followers."

— Sahih al-Bukhari, 1:10:504, Sahih Muslim, 37:6655, Sahih Muslim, 37:6658

- In Sahih Muslim narrated Anas ibn Malik,

A person came to Allah's Apostle said: Allah's messenger, I have committed an offence which deserves imposition of haad, so impose it upon me according to the Book of Allah. Thereupon he said: Were you not present with us at the time of prayer? He said: Yes. Thereupon he said: You have been granted pardon.

— Sahih Muslim, 37:6660

On the authority of Abu Umama (RA), the Messenger of Allah, may God bless him and grant him peace, said, "Surely the angel of the left holds the pen over a sinner or a criminal Muslim for six hours." Then if he repents of his sin and seeks forgiveness from Allah, then he ignores it. Lest a sin is written."

— Tabarani Kabir 7667, Baihakbir Shuabul Iman 7051, Sahih al-Jame'/2097, Silsilatus Sahiha 1209

== Theological viewpoints ==
Since the issue of tawba or repentance arises from Islamic religious context, it can be understood well when discussed from that perspective.

=== Repentance to Allah alone ===
Islam does not view any human being as being infallible. Any human being can be subject to errors; only Allah is perfect. Thus the sole authority for the forgiveness of any human being corresponds to Allah. Muslims deny the authority of men to listen to another person's confessions and then pronounce him forgiven of his sin. Likewise repenting to anyone besides Allah is forbidden. The Quran states:

Verily those whom ye call upon besides Allah are servants like unto you.

— Quran, Sura 7 (Al-Araf), ayah 194

== Tawbah ==
=== Tawbah and the benevolence of Allah ===
Sincere tawbah is always accepted by Allah. In the Qu'ran, it is written:

Verily, He is One Who forgives (accepts repentance), the Most Merciful.

— Quran, Sura 2 (Al-Baqara), ayah 37

In numerous verses of the Quran, Allah describes himself as being extremely generous, merciful, and forgiving towards his creations. In verse 22 of sura Al-Hashr, for example, he assures: "He is Allah besides Whom there is no God; the Knower of the unseen and the seen; He is the Beneficent, the Merciful".

The use of the verse "In the name of Allah, the Benevolent, the Merciful" at the beginning of every surah (except one) further testifies to this fact. According to the Quran and Hadith, Allah's overarching mercy permits even the gravest sins to be pardoned by him, provided the wrongdoer intends a sincere tawbah.

Shirk is an unforgivable sin if one dies without repenting from it:

Indeed, Allah does not forgive associating others with Him in worship, but forgives anything else of whoever He wills. And whoever associates others with Allah has indeed committed a grave sin.

— Quran, Sura 4 (An-Nisa), ayah 48

As such, becoming hopeless of the mercy of Allah is prohibited. The Quran declares:

Say: "O my Servants who have transgressed against their souls! Despair not of the Mercy of Allah: for Allah forgives all sins: for He is Oft-Forgiving, Most Merciful.

— Quran, Sura 39 (Az-Zumar), ayah 53

Again, God says to the believers in a Hadith Qudsi:

O son of Adam, so long as you call upon Me, and ask of Me, I shall forgive you for what you have done, and I shall not mind. O son of Adam, were your sins to reach the clouds of the sky and were you then to ask forgiveness of Me, I would forgive you. O son of Adam were you to come to Me with sins nearly as great as the earth, and were you then to face Me, ascribing no partner to Me, I would bring you forgiveness nearly as great as it.

=== Conditions of tawbah ===
According to Islamic Sharia, when an act of tawbah is performed by a Muslim, Allah generally accepts it. However, that tawbah should be sincere and true. Islamic scholars agree upon the fact that if a person is not ashamed of their past misdeeds, or does not intend to forsake those, then their verbal announcement of tawbah is an open mockery of repentance.

Mere verbal repentance does not account for a true tawbah. A sincere tawbah has some criteria. Ali was asked as to what is tawbah, and he replied that tawbah consists of six elements:

1. to regret one's past evil deeds;
2. to carry out divine duties (fard, wajib etc.) that were missed;
3. to return the rights/properties of others that were usurped unjustly;
4. to ask forgiveness of a person who has been wronged by him, physically or verbally;
5. to make a firm resolve of avoiding the sin in future; and
6. to employ oneself in Allah's obedience, as he previously employed himself in Allah's disobedience.

In Islamic sharia, tawbah is a twofold approach: a person first should be able to recognize and forsake their sins upon which Allah promises to forgive them. Islam expects Muslims to realize their mistakes and shortcomings, and to seek his forgiveness. Forgiveness for one's sins is not something that comes automatically; it is something that must be sought for, with sincereness and true devotion. Becoming indifferent to one's sins is seen as dangerous. Muhammad said:

A believer sees his sins as if he were sitting under a mountain which, he is afraid, may fall on him; whereas the wicked person considers his sins as flies passing over his nose and he just drives them away like this (and he moved his hand over his nose in illustration).

— Sahih al-Bukhari, 8:75:320

Another important perspective on repentance in Islam is that a person should always seek God's forgiveness even when they are not apparently guilty of any particular sin. This is because there are many subtle natures of sin involving immorality which escape notice, and also because it is a Muslim's duty to turn towards God.

- In hadith, Muhammad asked people to seek Allah's forgiveness: "O people, seek repentance from Allah. Verily, I seek repentance from Him a hundred times a day."
- In Islamic sharia, submission to Allah is necessary not only for achieving God's forgiveness, but also for being worthy of entering into paradise. Muhammad said: "Do good deeds properly, sincerely and moderately, and receive good news because one's good deeds will not make him enter Paradise." The companions asked, "Even you, O Allah's Apostle?" He said, "Even I, unless and until Allah bestows His pardon and Mercy on me."

=== Turning away from tawba ===
1. Postponement of tawbah according to Islam was seen as a great sin.

== Opinions of scholars ==
Shaykh Abdur Razzaq Al-Badr said, Ibn Qayyim says: "Sins inevitably take away blessings. No servant commits a sin except that a blessing from Allah is taken away from him in proportion to that sin. If he repents and returns to it, it or something similar is returned to him. But if he persists in it, it is not returned to him. Sins continue to take away one blessing after another until all blessings are taken away. Allah the Almighty says: "Indeed, Allah will not change the condition of a people until they change what is in themselves." (Ar-Ra'd: 11) In short, sins are the fire of blessings, devouring them just as fire devours wood."

== See also ==
- Glossary of Islam
- Taqwa
- At-Tawbah
- Salat al-Tawbah
- Sin in Islam
- Ihsan
- Index of Islam-related articles
- Islah
- Itmam al-hujjah
- Islamic views on sin
- Islamic views on piety
- Istighfar
- Metanoia (theology)
- Muslim theology
- Outline of Islam
- Qalb
- Tazkiah
- Teshuva, a similar concept in Judaism
