= Sanatul Fuqaha =

Sanatul Fuqaha (94 A.H.), or the year of the Fuqaha, refers to the year in which many Islamic scholars and jurists died including: Saeed b. Musayyab, Urwah b. Zubair, and Saeed b. Jubayr.
