= Demandingness objection =

Argument raised against consequentialist ethical theories

The demandingness objection is a common argument raised against utilitarianism and other consequentialist ethical theories. It suggests that the consequentialist requirement that we impartially maximize the good seems to require us to perform acts that we would normally consider optional.

For example, if our resources maximize utility through charitable contributions rather than spending them on ourselves, we are, according to utilitarianism, morally required to do so. The objection holds that this clashes with our intuitions about morality, since we would normally consider such acts to be "supererogatory" (praiseworthy but not obligatory). It is argued that because consequentialism appears to demand more than common-sense morality, it ought to be revised or rejected.

== History ==
The most commonly credited influential early statement of the demandingness objection is Bernard Williams, A Critique of Utilitarianism (1973).

== Singer's premise ==
Peter Singer famously made the case for his demanding form of consequentialism in "Famine, Affluence, and Morality". Here is the thrust of Singer's argument:

- "Suffering and death from lack of food, shelter and medical care are bad".
- "If it is in our power to prevent something bad from happening, without thereby sacrificing anything of comparable moral importance, then we ought, morally, to do it".
- "It makes no moral difference whether the person I can help is a neighbor's child ten yards from me or a Bengali whose name I shall never know, ten thousand miles away".
- "The principle makes no distinction between cases in which I am the only person who could possibly do anything and cases in which I am just one among millions in the same position".

Since it is in our power to prevent suffering without sacrificing anything of comparable moral importance, and because the third and fourth premises reject two commonly held intuitions about our moral obligations, we are morally required to prevent suffering in any form. Morality as Singer understands it (that is, from a consequentialist perspective) really is (and should be) this demanding.

== Corbett's objection ==
Bob Corbett argues that Singer's definition of "moral obligation" is too broad, and objects to the simplistic extremity of Singer's concepts of "Absolute Poverty" (anything below survival threshold) and "Absolute Luxury" (anything above survival threshold).

He argues that Singer's definition of what is possible for an individual, while technically adhering to the letter, violates the spirit of the Kantian principle that "ought" implies "can". Citing the fact that Singer himself regards adhering to this "extreme" definition to be impractical, Corbett asserts that it therefore cannot be regarded as holding the force of a moral obligation.

Corbett further argues that his own definition of circumstances that meet the criteria of a "moral obligation" exists only in extreme proximity: for example a car crash directly in the presence of a medical professional. "The practical necessity of having a moral obligation which we can keep requires us to be limited in obligation to those cases that we experience directly in the chances of living, and not to the entire world of suffering which we can know".

For Corbett, having a moral obligation to people thousands of miles away "is psychologically too strong [a requirement] for anyone to achieve"; therefore it cannot be a moral obligation.

== Pettit's objection ==
Philip Pettit replies to Singer's fourth point. For Pettit, there is a distinction between cases in which one is the only person who could possibly do anything and cases in which one is just one among millions in the same position (compare bystander effect). He argues that "There is a distinction between what it is best to do and what you cannot reasonably be denounced for doing" (p. 165).

For Pettit, this depends on a question of justification. If I am the only person who can possibly save someone's life and I am able to do it at relatively little cost to myself but fail to do so, I have no way of justifying my behaviour to others. If I am one among millions who can save the life of a Bengali orphan by giving to charity, then I only have a limited obligation to that child compatible with others having a similar obligation. That is, I need not reduce myself to the level of marginal utility to help that child: all I need to do is my fair share. If the child dies because others have failed to do their fair share then the onus falls on those others, not me. For Pettit, the fact that I have done my fair share is enough of a justification for having let the child die; thus, I cannot reasonably be denounced for having acted in this way.

== Nagel's defence ==
According to Thomas Nagel, consequentialism need not be too demanding since it is possible to distinguish between 'agent-neutral' reasons and 'agent-relative' reasons.

An agent-neutral reason is a reason that applies to anybody: for example, anybody has a reason to want any pain to stop, regardless of whose pain it is.

An agent-relative reason is a reason that applies only to particular individuals: for example, not everybody has a reason to want me to study every day, however, "I" have a reason to want to study every day, because I want to pass my exams.

Since "my" projects depend on my interests and desires, and since "my" interests and desires do not seem to generate agent-neutral reasons, by elimination the reasons in question must be agent-relative. Having established that there are genuine agent-relative reasons, Nagel concludes that it must sometimes be possible to pursue our own interests instead of the overall good, since agent-relative reasons will sometimes outweigh agent-neutral reasons. Thus the fact that moral requirements exist does not need to conflict with the pursuit of our own projects.

=== Kagan's reply to Nagel ===
Shelly Kagan argues that although Nagel's account establishes the existence of agent-relative reasons it does not explain them and therefore does little to vindicate the intuition that Nagel seeks to defend, namely, that we can promote our own projects without compromising moral imperatives.

Kagan further argues that Nagel's argument may justify acting to promote our own projects but it does not appear to account for the fact that we are free to sacrifice our own interests if we choose to do so. Kagan claims that Nagel's argument implies that such a sacrifice must always be irrational when one has conflicting agent-relative reasons. Thus since it is not irrational, his premise is not clearly compatible with the idea that we have moral requirements in the first place.
