= Religion and negotiations =

Trust building is the most influential factor in negotiating between two sides. The stronger this factor appears, the greater the chance will be for negotiators to cooperate. Studies have suggested that religious backgrounds can have a direct impact on the confidence and process of negotiation. Such tendencies generally do not prevent a contract or an agreement from being concluded; however, there are reasons to believe that religious affiliations reduce the negotiation process and give more confidence to decision makers.

== Religious values versus economic interests ==
Researchers have found that religious authorities are reluctant to negotiate what goes against their religious affiliations, even if these tendencies should not be expressed in an important or profitable negotiation. In other words, for such leaders, the preservation of values is preferred over economic interests, as they are willing to maintain their faith in business ties where religious beliefs are generally ignored or concealed. An example of this conflict is when one faction insists on excessive transparency in trade restrictions that can be frustrating for the rival party to negotiate. Such transparency is, of course, an advantage for Muslim leaders, as based on a hadith by Muhammad, the righteous merchants equal martyrs on the Day of Judgment.

=== Profit-oriented secular approach ===
The difference in negotiation from a secular and religious perspective is the purpose of the negotiation and the means employed to achieve the desired outcome. Western and secular discourses have a predominantly materialist approach and use all means to realize national interests. In this regard, the law and government institutions define the well-being of a society in the interest of the public and strive to achieve this ideal. The principles of this school are fundamentally materialistic, which can prevent the emergence of ethics in international relations.

=== Value-based religious approach ===
From a religious and especially Islamic point of view, the set of political and economic approaches and orientations must have a divine nature, and the aims and means of this set must also conform to divine law, otherwise it will be sanctioned by the sacred law. In this approach, negotiation is fundamentally different from the way it is perceived in the West, though its structural goals have obvious similarities. For Islam, the methods used in diplomacy must be humane and in line with human ethics; this is why the system of communication between ethics and diplomacy must be thoroughly scrutinized, and be consistent with Muhammad's political approach in which he has banned immoral and unconventional methods of profiting.

== Stronger engagement with shared beliefs ==
As shown by scholars, although religious beliefs may not have a direct impact on the motivation of negotiators, they can have positive and constructive results for both parties, especially in interactions and social relationships. Shared religious views can also create an emotional bond between individuals, encouraging them to persuade one another. International relations experts have also found that the process of negotiating in groups that do not share opinions is longer and more divisive. While religious beliefs can lead to some kind of intimacy between the negotiators, it will impose restrictions on them, if they are confronted with a different religion.

In transactions, what matters to managers is finding a suitable solution to encourage the negotiating team to accept the terms of the contract. But each team's strategy will vary depending on how religious they are. In Islamic jurisprudence, rationality and attention to all aspects and dimensions of a contract have been emphasized. However, in some cases where there is a negotiation between religious and non-religious parties, the difference in strategy causes groups with religious tendencies to take an emotional approach and pay less attention to details. Studies also confirm the relationship between "religiosity and intergroup bias".

== Cultural and linguistic differences ==
More detailed research in this area suggests that cultural and linguistic differences between religious groups do not have a significant effect on the quality of negotiations. Comparisons between Muslims in Malaysia and the Arab world with different local and regional cultures show that their negotiations are homogeneous in form and do not make much difference in value.

== See also ==
- Negotiation
- Islamic economics
- Negotiation theory
