= Iza Hussin =

Iza Hussin is an academic at the University of Cambridge, who writes on Islamic law in colonial and post-colonial states. Hussin is an associate professor in Asian Politics at the Department of Politics and International Studies (POLIS) and Mohamed Noah Fellow at Pembroke College, Cambridge. She is a series editor for the Cambridge University Press Series Asian Connections, and on the editorial boards of the Social Science Research Council’s The Immanent Frame, and Indonesia and the Malay World.

== Life ==
Hussin gained an AM and AB from Harvard University before studying for her MA at Georgetown University and gaining a PhD at the University of Washington. She was a member of the political science faculty at the University of Chicago before moving to Cambridge.

For Hussin, Islamic law has been continuously re-invented as a 'problem-space' for the modern state. Her 2016 book The Politics of Islamic Law examinined the way in which the colonial encounter in British Malaya, India and Egypt simultaneously marginalized and centralized Islamic law. The final two chapters used two Malay apostasy cases – that of Lina Joy and Nyonya Tahir – to pursue changing relations between sharia, society and the post-colonial nation-state. One reviewer praised it as "a work of unique critical sensibilities, setting the scene for future interdisciplinary research of colonial and postcolonial Islamic law".

In 2015, she spoke at the Cambridge Union on colonialism and fundamentalism.

Hussin has participated in campaigns defending academic freedom. In 2018 she was one of 300 academics who signed an open letter to Singapore's Select Committee on Deliberate Online Falsehoods, objecting to the committee's efforts to discredit historian P J Thum. In 2019 she defended the poet Alfian Sa’at after he was attacked by Singapore's Education Minister Ong Ye Kung. In 2021 she signed a joint letter in solidarity with students at Boğaziçi University protesting against the Turkish government. In August 2020 she joined the Cambridge University Libraries Decolonisation Working Group (DWG).

== Works ==
- The Politics of Islamic Law: Local Elites, Colonial Authority and the Making of the Muslim State. University of Chicago Press, 2016.
- All the Seas Were Ink: Islamic Constitutionalism in Motion. Cambridge University Press, 2026.
