= Salat al-Tawba =

Muslim prayer

Salat al-Tawbah; (Prayer of Repentance, also Namaz-e-Tawbah) is a Muslim prayer consisting of two rak'as (units or cycles of ritual prayer), according to Sunni tradition, or four rak'as, according to Shi'a tradition. The prayer is called for if a Muslim falls into sin—whether the sin is major or minor.

== See also ==
- Repentance in Islam
- Al-Tawbah
