= Mubah =

Islamic legal term for neutral actions

Mubāḥ (Arabic: مباح, lit. 'permitted') is a term used in Islamic jurisprudence to describe actions that a person has no specific obligation to perform or abstain from, and thus attracts no reward (ثواب, thawāb) or punishment from God in Islam.

== Fiqh ==
In the principles of Islamic jurisprudence (Arabic: أصول الفقه, romanized: uṣūl al-fiqh), rulings governing actions fall into categories known as "the five rulings" (الأحكام الخمسة, al-aḥkām al-khamsa).

It is a sin or a crime to perform a forbidden action or not to perform a mandatory action. Avoiding reprehensible acts and performing recommended acts is held to be subject of reward in the afterlife, while allowed actions entail no judgement from God.

1. Obligatory (واجب, wājib or فرض, farḍ);
2. Recommended (مُسْتَحَبّ, mustaḥabb or المندوب, mandūb);
3. Neutral, that is, not involving God's judgment (مباح, mubāḥ);
4. Disliked or reprehensible (مكروه, makrūh);
5. Forbidden (حَرَام, ḥarām or محظور, maḥzūr).

Islamic jurists disagree on whether the term halal covers the first two, three, or four of these categories. Mubāḥ is commonly translated as "neutral" or "permitted" in English "indifferent" or "(merely) permitted". A mubāḥ action is one that is not mandatory, recommended, reprehensible or forbidden, and thus involves no judgement from God. The assignment of acts to this legal category reflects a deliberate choice rather than an oversight on the part of jurists.

In Islamic property law, the term mubāḥ refers to things which have no owner. It is similar to the concept res nullius used in Roman law and common law.

== See also ==
- Adiaphora – Concepts in philosophy and religion, a similar concept in Stoicism
- Islamic views on sin
- Seeking the forgiveness of Allah (istighfar)
- Moderation in Islam
- Repentance (tawbah)
