= Fiqh =

Islamic jurisprudence

- Arabic: فقه
- Romanization: fiqh
- IPA: [fɪqh]
- Literal meaning: "deep understanding" "full comprehension"

Fiqh (/fiːk/; Arabic: فِقْه [fɪqh]) is the term for Islamic jurisprudence. Fiqh is often described as the style of human understanding, research and practices of the sharia; that is, human understanding of the divine Islamic law as revealed in the Quran as well as the sunnah (the teachings and practices of the Islamic prophet Muhammad and his companions). Fiqh expands and develops sharia through interpretation (ijtihad) of the Quran and sunnah by Islamic jurists (ulama) and is implemented by the rulings (fatwa) of jurists on questions presented to them. Thus, whereas sharia is considered immutable and infallible by Muslims, fiqh is considered fallible and changeable.

Fiqh deals with the observance of rituals, morals and social legislation in Islam as well as economic and political system. In the modern era, there are four prominent schools (madh'hab) of fiqh within Sunni practice, plus two (or three) within Shi'a practice. A person trained in fiqh is known as a faqīh (pl. fuqahāʾ).

Figuratively, fiqh means knowledge about Islamic legal rulings from their sources. Deriving religious rulings from their sources requires the mujtahid (an individual who exercises ijtihad) to have a deep understanding in the different discussions of jurisprudence.

The studies of fiqh are traditionally divided into uṣūl al-fiqh (principles of Islamic jurisprudence, lit. "the roots of fiqh"), the methods of legal interpretation and analysis, and furūʿ al-fiqh (lit. "the branches of fiqh"), the elaboration of rulings on the basis of these principles. Furūʿ al-fiqh is the product of the application of uṣūl al-fiqh and the total product of human efforts at understanding the divine will. A hukm (pl. aḥkām) is a particular ruling in a given case.

== Etymology ==
The word fiqh is an Arabic term meaning "deep understanding" or "full comprehension". Technically it refers to the body of Islamic law extracted from detailed Islamic sources (which are studied in the principles of Islamic jurisprudence) and the process of gaining knowledge of Islam through jurisprudence. The historian Ibn Khaldun describes fiqh as "knowledge of the rules of God which concern the actions of persons who own themselves connected to obey the law respecting what is required (wajib), sinful (haraam), recommended (mandūb), disapproved (makrūh), or neutral (mubah)". This definition is consistent amongst the jurists.

In Modern Standard Arabic, fiqh has also come to mean Islamic jurisprudence. It is not thus possible to speak of Chief Justice John Roberts as an expert in the common law fiqh of the United States, or of Egyptian legal scholar Abd El-Razzak El-Sanhuri as an expert in the civil law fiqh of Egypt.

== History ==
According to Sunni Islamic history, Sunni law followed a chronological path of:

- God → Muhammad → Companions → Followers → Fiqh.

The commands and prohibitions chosen by God were revealed through the agency of the Prophet in both the Quran and the Sunnah (words, deeds, and examples of the Prophet passed down as hadith). The first Muslims (the Sahabah or Companions) heard and obeyed, and passed this essence of Islam to succeeding generations (Tabi'un and Tabi' al-Tabi'in or successors/followers and successors of successors), as Muslims and Islam spread from West Arabia to the conquered lands north, east, and west, (Note: for example, Sunni Hanbali scholar/preacher Al-Hasan ibn 'Ali al-Barbahari (d.941) who ruled the streets of Baghdad from 921-941 CE, insisted that "whoever asserts that there is any part of Islam with which the Companions of the Prophet did not provide us has called them [the Companions of the Prophet] liars".) where it was systematized and elaborated.

The history of Islamic jurisprudence is "customarily divided into eight periods":

- the first period ending with the death of Muhammad in 11 AH.
- second period "characterized by personal interpretations" of the canon by the Sahabah or companions of Muhammad, lasting until 50 AH.
- from 50 AH until the early second century AH there was competition between "a traditionalist approach to jurisprudence" in western Arabia where Islam was revealed and a "rationalist approach in Iraq".
- the "golden age of classical Islamic jurisprudence" from the "early second to the mid-fourth century when the eight "most significant" schools of Sunni and Shi'i jurisprudence emerged."
- from the mid-fourth century to mid-seventh AH Islamic jurisprudence was "limited to elaborations within the main juristic schools".
- the "dark age" of Islamic jurisprudence stretched from the fall of Baghdad in the mid-seventh AH (1258 CE) to 1293 AH/1876 CE.
- In 1293 AH (1876 CE) the Ottomans codified Hanafi jurisprudence in the Majallah el-Ahkam-i-Adliya. Several "juristic revival movements" influenced by "exposure to Western legal and technological progress" followed until the mid-20th century CE. Muhammad Abduh and Abd El-Razzak El-Sanhuri were products of this era. However, Abduh and El-Sanhuri were modernists. 19th century Ottoman Shariah Code was built on the views of the Hanafi school.
- The most recent era has been that of the "Islamic revival", which has been "predicated on rejection of Western social and legal advances" and the development of specifically Islamic states, social sciences, economics, and finance.

The formative period of Islamic jurisprudence stretches back to the time of the early Muslim communities. During this period, jurists were more concerned with issues of authority and teaching than with theory and methodology.

Progress in theory and methodology happened with the coming of the early Muslim jurist Muhammad ibn Idris ash-Shafi`i (767–820), who codified the basic principles of Islamic jurisprudence in his book ar-Risālah. The book details the four roots of law (Qur'an, sunnah, ijma, and qiyas) while specifying that the primary Islamic texts (the Qur'an and the hadith) be understood according to objective rules of interpretation derived from scientific study of the Arabic language.

Secondary sources of law were developed and refined over the subsequent centuries, consisting primarily of juristic preference (istihsan), laws of the previous prophets (shara man qablana), continuity (istishab), extended analogy (maslaha mursala), blocking the means (sadd al-dhari'ah), local customs (urf), and sayings of a companion of the Prophet (qawl al-sahabi).

=== Diagram of early scholars ===
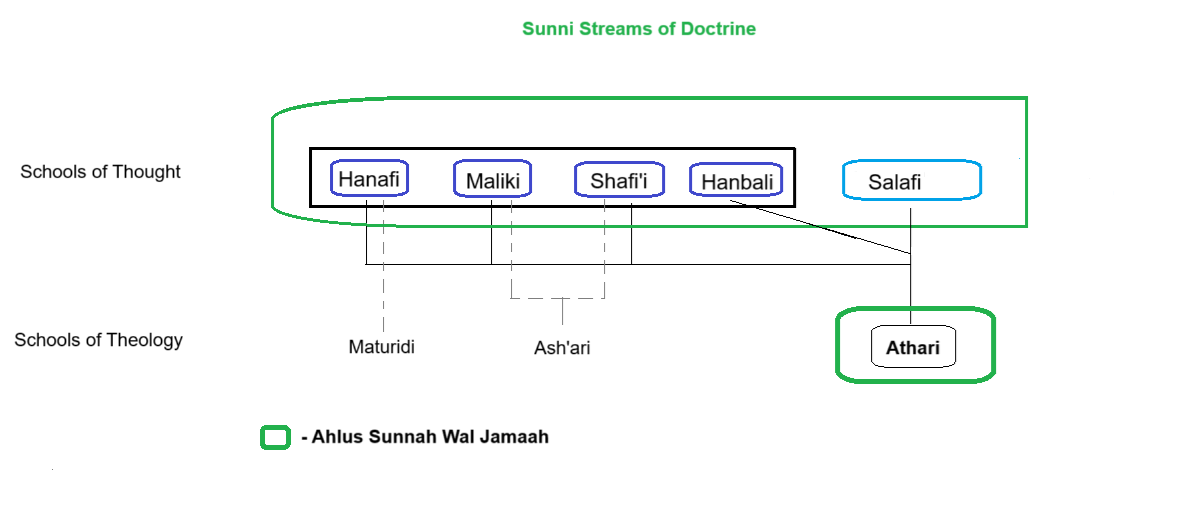
Main schools of thought within Sunni Islam, and other prominent streams.

Major schools of thought and theology in the Islamic world

The Quran set the rights, responsibilities, and rules for people and societies to adhere to, such as dealing in interest. Muhammad then provided an example, which is recorded in the hadith books, showing people how he practically implemented these rules in a society. After the passing of Muhammad, there was a need for jurists, to decide on new legal matters where there is no such ruling in the Quran or the hadith, example of Muhammad regarding a similar case.

In the years proceeding Muhammad, the community in Madina continued to use the same rules. People were familiar with the practice of Muhammad and therefore continued to use the same rules.

The scholars appearing in the diagram below were taught by Muhammad's companions, many of whom settled in Madina. Muwatta by Malik ibn Anas was written as a consensus of the opinion, of these scholars. Muwatta by Malik ibn Anas quotes 13 hadiths from Imam Jafar al-Sadiq. Aisha also taught her nephew Urwah ibn Zubayr. He then taught his son Hisham ibn Urwah, who was the main teacher of Malik ibn Anas whose views many Sunni follow and also taught by Jafar al-Sadiq. Qasim ibn Muhammad ibn Abi Bakr, Hisham ibn Urwah and Muhammad al-Baqir taught Zayd ibn Ali, Jafar al-Sadiq, Abu Hanifa, and Malik ibn Anas.

Imam Jafar al-Sadiq, Imam Abu Hanifa and Malik ibn Anas worked together in Al-Masjid an-Nabawi in Medina, along with Qasim ibn Muhammad ibn Abi Bakr, Muhammad al-Baqir, Zayd ibn Ali and over 70 other leading jurists and scholars.

Al-Shafi'i was taught by Malik ibn Anas. Ahmad ibn Hanbal was taught by Al-Shafi'i. Muhammad al-Bukhari travelled everywhere collecting hadith and his father Ismail ibn Ibrahim was a student of Malik ibn Anas.

Early Islamic scholars

Muhammad, The final Messenger of God (570–632) the Constitution of Medina, taught the Quran, and advised his companions
Abdullah ibn Masud (died 653) taught	Ali (607–661) fourth caliph taught	Aisha, Muhammad's wife and Abu Bakr's daughter taught	Abd Allah ibn Abbas (618–687) taught	Zayd ibn Thabit (610–660) taught	Umar (579–644) second caliph taught	Abu Hurairah (603–681) taught
Alqama ibn Qays (died 681) taught	Husayn ibn Ali (626–680) taught	Qasim ibn Muhammad ibn Abi Bakr (657–725) taught and raised by Aisha	Urwah ibn Zubayr (died 713) taught by Aisha, he then taught	Said ibn al-Musayyib (637–715) taught	Abdullah ibn Umar (614–693) taught	Abd Allah ibn al-Zubayr (624–692) taught by Aisha, he then taught
Ibrahim al-Nakha’i taught	Ali ibn Husayn Zayn al-Abidin (659–712) taught	Hisham ibn Urwah (667–772) taught	Ibn Shihab al-Zuhri (died 741) taught	Salim ibn Abd-Allah ibn Umar taught	Umar ibn Abdul Aziz (682–720) raised and taught by Abdullah ibn Umar
Hammad ibn Abi Sulayman taught	Muhammad al-Baqir (676–733) taught	Farwah bint al-Qasim Jafar's mother
Abu Hanifa (699–767) wrote Al Fiqh Al Akbar and Kitab Al-Athar, jurisprudence followed by Sunni, Sunni Sufi, Barelvi, Deobandi, Zaidiyyah and originally by the Fatimid and taught	Zayd ibn Ali (695–740)	Ja'far bin Muhammad Al-Baqir (702–765) Muhammad and Ali's great great grand son, jurisprudence followed by Shia, he taught	Malik ibn Anas (711–795) wrote Muwatta, jurisprudence from early Medina period now mostly followed by Maliki Sunnis in North Africa, and taught	Al-Waqidi (748–822) wrote history books like Kitab al-Tarikh wa al-Maghazi, student of Malik ibn Anas	Abu Muhammad Abdullah ibn Abdul Hakam (died 829) wrote biographies and history books, student of Malik ibn Anas
Abu Yusuf (729–798) wrote Usul al-fiqh	Muhammad al-Shaybani (749–805)	al-Shafi‘i (767–820) wrote Al-Risala, jurisprudence followed by Shafi'i Sunnis and Sufis, and taught	Ismail ibn Ibrahim	Ali ibn al-Madini (778–849) wrote The Book of Knowledge of the Companions	Ibn Hisham (died 833) wrote early history and As-Sirah an-Nabawiyyah, Muhammad's biography
Isma'il ibn Ja'far (719–775)	Musa al-Kadhim (745–799)	Ahmad ibn Hanbal (780–855) wrote Musnad Ahmad ibn Hanbal jurisprudence followed by Hanbali Sunnis and Sufis	Muhammad al-Bukhari (810–870) wrote Sahih al-Bukhari hadith books	Muslim ibn al-Hajjaj (815–875) wrote Sahih Muslim hadith books	Dawud al-Zahiri (815–883/4) founded the Zahiri school	Muhammad ibn Isa at-Tirmidhi (824–892) wrote Jami` at-Tirmidhi hadith books	Al-Baladhuri (died 892) wrote early history Futuh al-Buldan, Genealogies of the Nobles
Ibn Majah (824–887) wrote Sunan ibn Majah hadith book	Abu Dawood (817–889) wrote Sunan Abu Dawood Hadith Book
Muhammad ibn Ya'qub al-Kulayni (864- 941) wrote Kitab al-Kafi hadith book followed by Twelver Shia	Muhammad ibn Jarir al-Tabari (838–923) wrote History of the Prophets and Kings, Tafsir al-Tabari	Abu al-Hasan al-Ash'ari (874–936) wrote Maqālāt al-islāmīyīn, Kitāb al-luma, Kitāb al-ibāna 'an usūl al-diyāna
Ibn Babawayh (923–991) wrote Man La Yahduruhu al-Faqih jurisprudence followed by Twelver Shia	Sharif Razi (930–977) wrote Nahj al-Balagha followed by Twelver Shia	Nasir al-Din al-Tusi (1201–1274) wrote jurisprudence books followed by Ismaili and Twelver Shia	Al-Ghazali (1058–1111) wrote The Niche for Lights, The Incoherence of the Philosophers, The Alchemy of Happiness on Sufism	Rumi (1207–1273) wrote Masnavi, Diwan-e Shams-e Tabrizi on Sufism
Key: Some of Muhammad's Companions	Key: Taught in Medina	Key: Taught in Iraq	Key: Worked in Syria	Key: Travelled extensively collecting the sayings of Muhammad and compiled books of hadith	Key: Worked in Persia

In the books actually written by these original jurists and scholars, there are very few theological and judicial differences between them. Imam Ahmad rejected the writing down and codifying of the religious rulings he gave. They knew that they might have fallen into error in some of their judgements and stated this clearly. They never introduced their rulings by saying, "Here, this judgement is the judgement of God and His prophet." There is also very little text actually written down by Jafar al-Sadiq himself. They all give priority to the Qur'an and the hadith (the practice of Muhammad). They felt that the Quran and the Hadith, the example of Muhammad provided people with almost everything they needed. "This day I have perfected for you your religion and completed My favor upon you and have approved for you Islam as religion" (Qur'an 5:3).

These scholars did not distinguish between each other. They were not Sunni or Shia. They felt that they were following the religion of Abraham as described in the Quran "Say: Allah speaks the truth; so follow the religion of Abraham, the upright one. And he was not one of the polytheists" (Qur'an 3:95).

Most of the differences are regarding Sharia laws devised through Ijtihad where there is no such ruling in the Quran or the hadiths of Islamic prophet Muhammad regarding a similar case. As these jurists went to new areas, they were pragmatic and continued to use the same ruling as was given in that area during pre-Islamic times, if the population felt comfortable with it, it was just and they used Ijtihad to deduce that it did not conflict with the Quran or the Hadith. As explained in the Muwatta by Malik ibn Anas. This made it easier for the different communities to integrate into the Islamic State and assisted in the quick expansion of the Islamic State.

To reduce the divergence, ash-Shafi'i proposed giving priority to the Qur'an and the Hadith (the practice of Muhammad) and only then look at the consensus of the Muslim jurists (ijma) and analogical reasoning (qiyas). This then resulted in jurists like Muhammad al-Bukhari dedicating their lives to the collection of the correct hadith, in books like Sahih al-Bukhari (Sahih translates as authentic or correct). They also felt that Muhammad's judgement was more impartial and better than their own.

These original jurists and scholars also acted as a counterbalance to the rulers. When they saw injustice, all these scholars spoke out against it. As the state expanded outside Madina, the rights of the different communities, as they were constituted in the Constitution of Medina still applied. The Quran also gave additional rights to the citizens of the state and these rights were also applied. Ali, Hassan and Husayn ibn Ali gave their allegiance to the first three caliphs because they abided by these conditions. Later Ali the fourth caliph wrote in a letter "I did not approach the people to get their oath of allegiance but they came to me with their desire to make me their Amir (ruler). I did not extend my hands towards them so that they might swear the oath of allegiance to me but they themselves extended their hands towards me." But later as fate would have it (Predestination in Islam) when Yazid I, an Umayyad ruler took power, Husayn ibn Ali the grandson of Muhammad felt that it was a test from God for him and his duty to confront him. Then Abd Allah ibn al-Zubayr, Qasim ibn Muhammad ibn Abi Bakr's cousin confronted the Umayyad rulers after Husayn ibn Ali was betrayed by the people of Kufa and killed by Syrian Roman Army now under the control of the Yazid I. Abd Allah ibn al-Zubayr then took on the Umayyads and expelled their forces from Hijaz and Iraq. But then his forces were depleted in Iraq, trying to stop the Khawarij. The Umayyads then moved in. After a lengthy campaign, in his last hour Abd Allah ibn al-Zubayr asked his mother Asma' bint Abu Bakr the daughter of Abu Bakr the first caliph for advice. Asma' bint Abu Bakr replied to her son, she said: "You know better in your own self, that if you are upon the truth and you are calling towards the truth go forth, for people more honourable than you have been killed and if you are not upon the truth, then what an evil son you are and you have destroyed yourself and those who are with you. If you say, that if you are upon the truth and you will be killed at the hands of others, then you will not truly be free." Abd Allah ibn al-Zubayr left and was later also killed and crucified by the Syrian Roman Army now under the control of the Umayyads and led by Hajjaj. Muhammad ibn Abi Bakr the son of Abu Bakr the first caliph and raised by Ali the fourth caliph was also killed by the Umayyads. Aisha then raised and taught her son Qasim ibn Muhammad ibn Abi Bakr who later taught his grandson Jafar al-Sadiq.

During the early Umayyad period, there was more community involvement. The Quran and Muhammad's example was the main source of law after which the community decided. If it worked for the community, was just and did not conflict with the Quran and the example of Muhammad, it was accepted. This made it easier for the different communities, with Roman, Persian, Central Asia and North African backgrounds to integrate into the Islamic State and that assisted in the quick expansion of the Islamic State. The scholars in Madina were consulted on the more complex judicial issues. The Sharia and the official more centralized schools of fiqh developed later, during the time of the Abbasids.

== Components ==
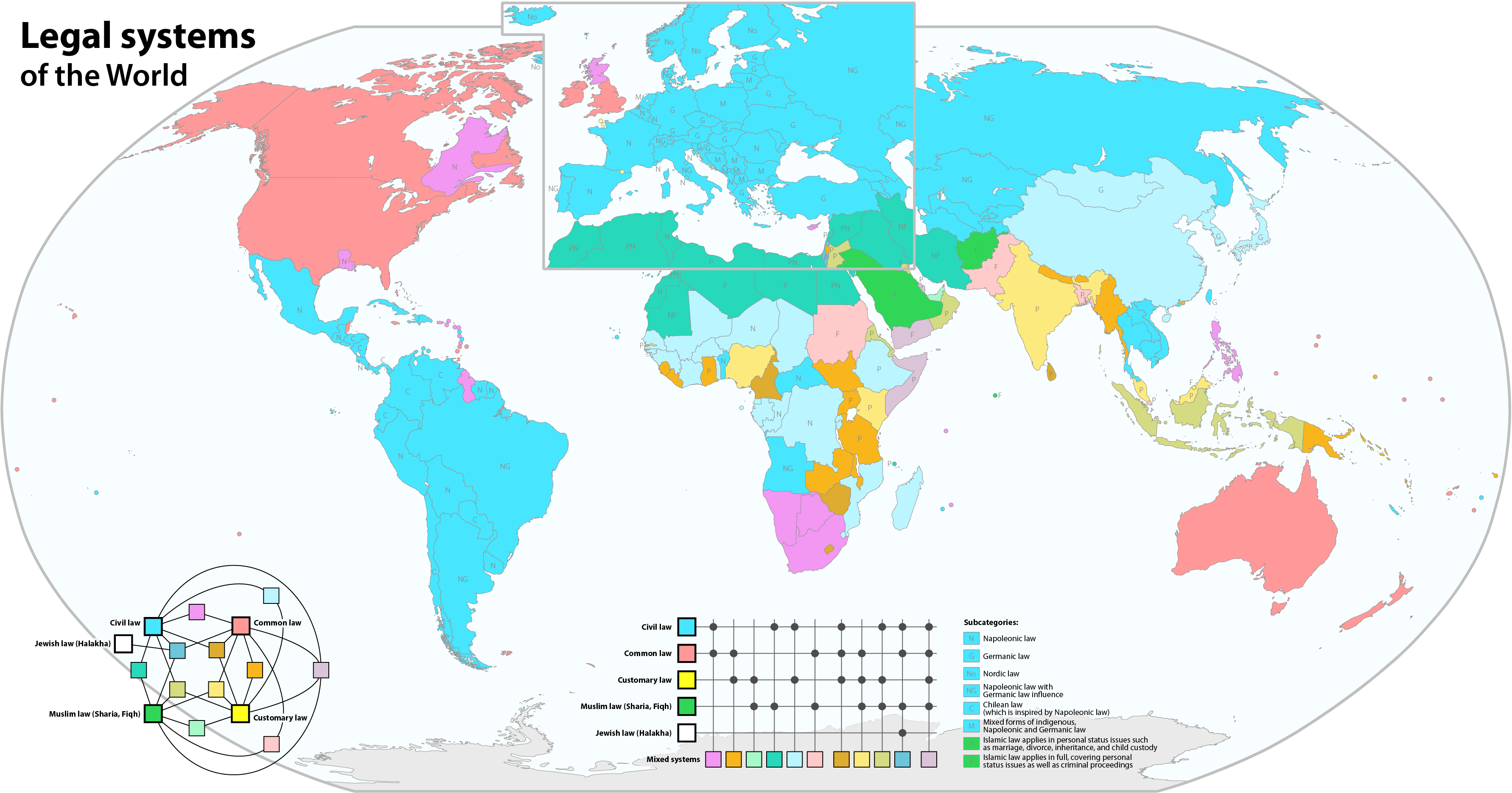
Legal systems of the world

The sources of Sharia in order of importance are:

1. Qur'an
2. Hadith
3. Ijma, i.e. collective reasoning and consensus amongst authoritative Muslims of a particular generation, and its interpretation by Islamic scholars.
4. The consensus of the Sahaba
5. Qiyas, analogical legal reasoning by Islamic jurists.

Majority of Sunni Muslims view Qiyas as a central Pillar of Ijtihad. An example is the ruling of Muhammad, that "a judge should not sit in judgement while angry", whereas reason adds that this extends to hunger or suffering from a painful disease. Zahirites, rejected Qiyas unlike the Sunnis. The Shi'a believed that all laws are implicitly mentioned in the Quran or the sunnah and can be discovered by the jurists of their tradition.

The Qur'an gives instructions on many issues, such as how to perform the ritual purification (wudu) before the obligatory daily prayers (salat). On other issues, for example, the Qur'an states one needs to engage in daily prayers (salat) and fast (sawm) during the month of Ramadan but further instructions and details on how to perform these duties can be found in the traditions of Muhammad, so Qur'an and Sunnah are in most cases the basis for (Shariah).

Some topics are without precedent in Islam's early period. In those cases, Muslim jurists (Fuqaha) try to arrive at conclusions by other means. Sunni jurists use historical consensus of the community (Ijma); a majority in the modern era also use analogy (Qiyas) and weigh the harms and benefits of new topics (Istislah), and a plurality utilizes juristic preference (Istihsan). The conclusions arrived at with the aid of these additional tools constitute a wide array of laws, and its application is called fiqh. Thus, in contrast to the sharia, fiqh is not regarded as sacred and the schools of thought have differing views on its details, without viewing other conclusions as sacrilegious. This division of interpretation in more detailed issues has resulted in different schools of thought (madh'hab).

This wider concept of Islamic jurisprudence is the source of a range of laws in different topics that guide Muslims in everyday life.

=== Component categories ===
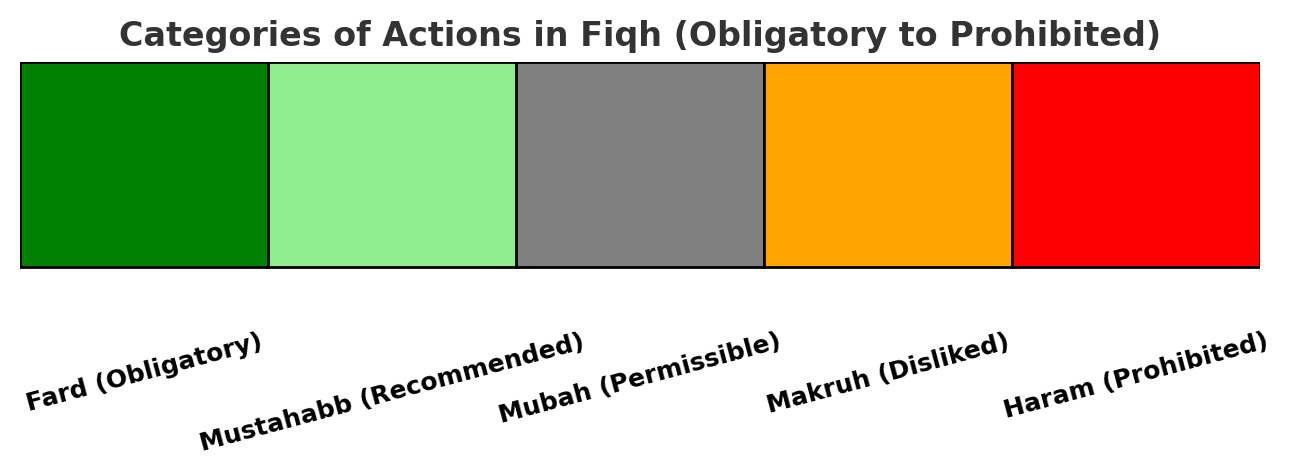
Actions in Islamic Fiqh

Islamic jurisprudence (fiqh) covers two main areas:

1. Rules in relation to actions, and,
2. Rules in relation to circumstances surrounding actions.

These types of rules can also fall into two groups:

1. Worship (Ibadaat)
2. Dealings and transactions (with people) (Mu`amalaat)

Rules in relation to actions ('amaliyya — عملية) or "decision types" comprise:

1. Obligation (fardh)
2. Recommendation (mustahabb)
3. Permissibility (mubah)
4. Disrecommendation (makrooh)
5. Prohibition (haraam)

Rules in relation to circumstances (wadia') comprise:

1. Condition (shart)
2. Cause (sabab)
3. Preventor (mani)
4. Permit / Enforced (rukhsah, azeemah)
5. Valid / Corrupt / Invalid (sahih, fasid, batil)
6. In time / Deferred / Repeat (adaa, qadaa, i'ada)

=== Methodologies of jurisprudence ===
The modus operandi of the Muslim jurist is known as usul al-fiqh ("principles of jurisprudence").

There are different approaches to the methodology used in jurisprudence to derive Islamic rulings from the primary sources of sharia (Islamic law). The main methodologies are those of the Sunni, Shi'a and Ibadi denominations. While both Sunni and Shi'ite (Shia) are divided into smaller sub-schools, the differences among the Shi'ite schools is considerably greater. Ibadites only follow a single school without divisions.

While using court decisions as legal precedents and case law are central to Western law, the importance of the institution of fatawa (non-binding answers by Islamic legal scholars to legal questions) has been called "central to the development" of Islamic jurisprudence. This is in part because of a "vacuum" in the other source of Islamic law, qada` (legal rulings by state appointed Islamic judges) after the fall of the last caliphate the Ottoman Empire. While the practice in Islam dates back to the time of Muhammad, according to at least one source (Muhammad El-Gamal), it is "modeled after the Roman system of responsa," and gives the questioner "decisive primary-mover advantage in choosing the question and its wording."

Each school (madhhab) reflects a unique urf or culture (a cultural practice that was influenced by traditions), that the classical jurists themselves lived in, when rulings were made. Some suggest that the discipline of isnad, which developed to validate hadith made it relatively easy to record and validate also the rulings of jurists. This, in turn, made them far easier to imitate (taqlid) than to challenge in new contexts. The argument is, the schools have been more or less frozen for centuries, and reflect a culture that simply no longer exists. Traditional scholars hold that religion is there to regulate human behavior and nurture people's moral side and since human nature has not fundamentally changed since the beginning of Islam a call to modernize the religion is essentially one to relax all laws and institutions.

Early shariah had a much more flexible character, and some modern Muslim scholars believe that it should be renewed, and that the classical jurists should lose special status. This would require formulating a new fiqh suitable for the modern world, e.g. as proposed by advocates of the Islamization of knowledge, which would deal with the modern context. This modernization is opposed by most conservative ulema. Traditional scholars hold that the laws are contextual and consider circumstance such as time, place and culture, the principles they are based upon are universal such as justice, equality and respect. Many Muslim scholars argue that even though technology may have advanced, the fundamentals of human life have not.

=== Fields of jurisprudence ===
- Criminal
- Economics
- Etiquette
- Family
- Hygienical
- Inheritance
- Marital
- Military
- Political
- Theological

=== Schools of jurisprudence ===
There are several schools of fiqh thought (Arabic: مذهب madhhab; pl. مذاهب maḏāhib)

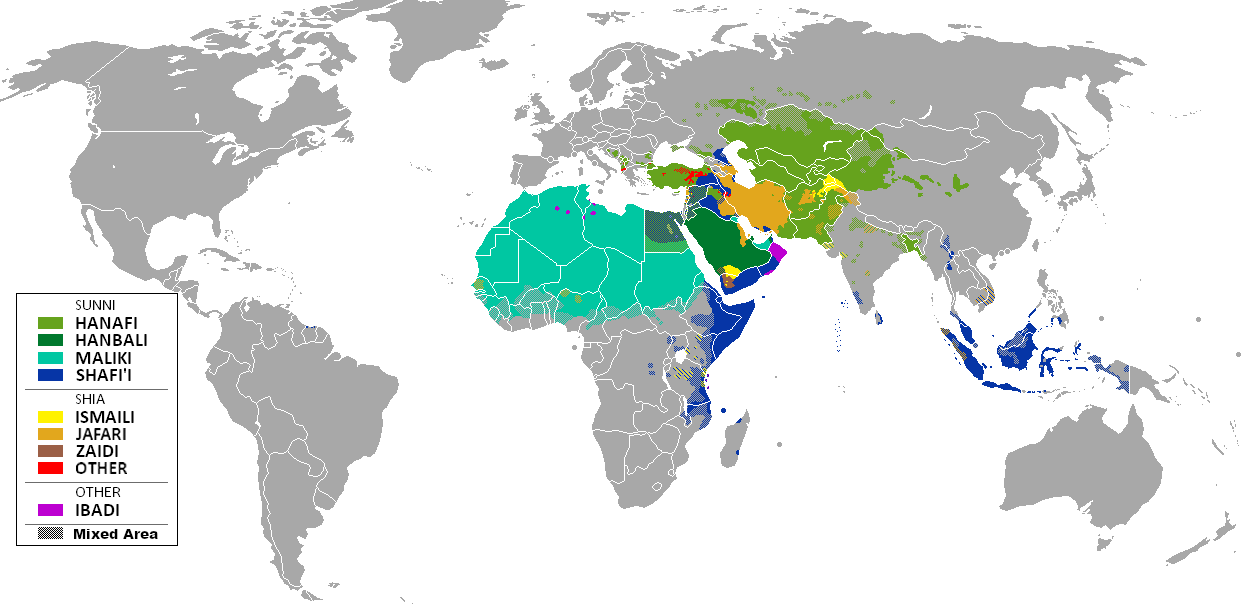
Map of the Muslim world with the main schools of thoughts

The schools of Sunni Islam are each named by students of the classical jurist who taught them. The Sunni schools (and where they are commonly found) are:

- Hanafi (Turkey, Balkans, Levant, Central Asia, South Asia, China, Northwest Caucasus, Lower Egypt, and Tatarstan)
- Maliki (North Africa, West Africa, Upper Egypt, Kuwait, Bahrain, Abu Dhabi, and Dubai)
- Shafi'i (Indonesia, Malaysia, Brunei, Kurdistan, East Africa, Northeast Caucasus, Yemen, Oman, Kerala, Fujairah, and the Sinai Peninsula)
- Hanbali (Saudi Arabia, Qatar, Sharjah, Umm al-Quwain, Ras al-Khaimah, and Ajman)

The Shia schools (and where they are commonly found) are:

- Ja'fari, followed by Twelver Shi'ites (Iran, Iraq, and Azerbaijan)
- Isma'ili (minority communities in Central Asia, South Asia, Levant, Yemen)
- Zaydi (minority communities in Yemen)

Entirely separate from both the Sunni and Shia traditions, Khawarij Islam has evolved its own distinct school.

- Ibadi (minority communities in Oman)

These schools share many of their rulings, but differ on the particular hadiths they accept as authentic and the weight they give to analogy or reason (qiyas) in deciding difficulties.

The relationship between (at least the Sunni) schools of jurisprudence and the conflict between the unity of the Shariah and the diversity of the schools, was expressed by the 12th century Hanafi scholar Abu Hafs Umar al-Nasafi, who wrote: "Our school is correct with the possibility of error, and another school is in error with the possibility of being correct."

== Influence on Western laws ==
A number of important legal institutions were developed by Muslim jurists during the classical period of Islam, known as the Islamic Golden Age. One such institution was the Hawala, an early informal value transfer system, which is mentioned in texts of Islamic jurisprudence as early as the 8th century. Hawala itself later influenced the development of the agency in common law and in civil laws such as the aval in French law and the avallo in Italian law.

The Waqf in Islamic law, which developed during the 7th–9th centuries, bears a notable resemblance to the trusts in the English trust law. For example, every Waqf was required to have a waqif (settlor), mutawillis (trustee), qadi (judge) and beneficiaries. The trust law developed in England at the time of the Crusades, during the 12th and 13th centuries, was introduced by Crusaders who may have been influenced by the Waqf institutions they came across in the Middle East.

In classical Islamic jurisprudence, litigants in court may obtain notarized statements from between three and twelve witnesses. When the statements of all witnesses are consistent, the notaries will certify their unanimous testimony in a legal document, which may be used to support the litigant's claim. The notaries serve to free the judge from the time-consuming task of hearing the testimony of each eyewitness himself, and their documents serve to legally authenticate each oral testimony. The Maliki school requires two notaries to collect a minimum of twelve eyewitness statements in certain legal cases, including those involving unregistered marriages and land disputes. John Makdisi has compared this group of twelve witness statements, known as a lafif, to English Common Law jury trials under Henry II, surmising a link between the king's reforms and the legal system of the Kingdom of Sicily. The island had previously been ruled by various Islamic dynasties.

Several other fundamental common law institutions may have been adapted from similar legal institutions in Islamic law and jurisprudence, and introduced to England by the Normans after the Norman conquest of England and the Emirate of Sicily, and by Crusaders during the Crusades. In particular, the "royal English contract protected by the action of debt is identified with the Islamic Aqd, the English assize of novel disseisin is identified with the Islamic Istihqaq, and the English jury is identified with the Islamic lafif." John Makdisi speculated that English legal institutions such as "the scholastic method, the licence to teach", the "law schools known as Inns of Court in England and Madrasas in Islam" and the "European commenda" (Islamic Qirad) may have also originated from Islamic law. The methodology of legal precedent and reasoning by analogy (Qiyas) are also similar in both the Islamic and common law systems. These influences have led some scholars to suggest that Islamic law may have laid the foundations for "the common law as an integrated whole".

== See also ==
- Abdallah al-Harari
- Traditionalist theology
- Bahar-e-Shariat
- Glossary of Islam
- Index of Islam-related articles
- Ja'fari jurisprudence
- Outline of Islam
- List of Islamic terms in Arabic
- Ma'ruf
- Mizan – a comprehensive treatise on the contents of Islam written by Javed Ahmed Ghamidi
- Palestinian law
- Schools of Islamic theology
- Sources of Islamic law
- The four Sunni Imams
- Urf
