= Supererogation =

Acts which are good but not morally required to be done

Supererogation (Late Latin: supererogatio "payment beyond what is needed or asked", from super "beyond" and erogare "to pay out, expend", itself from ex "out" and rogare "to ask") is the performance of more than is asked for; the action of doing more than duty requires. In ethics, an act is supererogatory if it is good but not morally required to be done. It refers to an act that is more than is necessary, when another course of action—involving less—would still be an acceptable action. It differs from a duty, which is an act wrong not to do, and from acts morally neutral. Supererogation may be considered as performing above and beyond a normative course of duty to further benefits and functionality.

Some philosophers have proposed a corresponding concept of suberogation – whereas supererogatory acts are praiseworthy but not morally required, suberogatory acts are morally discouraged but not prohibited. However, the concept is controversial; with some dispute as to whether suberogatory acts genuinely exist.

== In theology ==
=== Catholicism ===
In the theology of the Roman Catholic Church, "works of supererogation" (also called "acts of supererogation") are those performed beyond what God requires. The Roman Catholic Church holds that the counsels of perfection are supererogatory acts, which specific Christians may engage in above their moral duties. Similarly, it teaches that to determine how to act, one must engage in reasonable efforts to be sure of what the right actions are; after the reasonable action, the person is in a state of invincible ignorance and guiltless of wrongdoing, but to undertake more than reasonable actions to overcome ignorance is supererogatory, and praiseworthy.

According to the classic teaching on indulgences, the works of supererogation performed by all the saints form a treasure with God, the "treasury of merit," which the church can apply to exempt repentant sinners from the works of penitence that would otherwise be required of them to achieve full remission of the temporal punishment due to their sin.

=== Protestantism ===
Martin Luther's opposition of this teaching seeded the Protestant Reformation. The Church of England denied the doctrine of supererogation in the fourteenth of the Thirty-Nine Articles, which states that works of supererogation (and the idea of a "treasury of merit")

cannot be taught without arrogancy and impiety: for by them men do declare, that they not only render unto God as much as they are bound to, but that they do more for his sake, than of bounden duty is required: whereas Christ saith plainly, When ye have done all that are commanded to you, say, We are unprofitable servants

Later Protestant movements followed suit, such as in the Methodist Articles of Religion.

=== Islam ===
A Muslim must complete a minimum of the five daily prayers, each typically lasting an average of 5 to 10 minutes. Supererogatory prayers beyond these are known as nafl prayers, and praying them is considered to bear additional reward. There are also several other supererogatory acts in Islam, such as fasting outside of the month of Ramadhan, or giving sadaqah (charity, consisting of simple acts of kindness to financial assistance) that is not obligatory.

Parallels have been drawn between the concept of mustahabb in Islamic law and the concept of supererogatory acts in the Western philosophical tradition.

=== Judaism ===
In Rabbinic literature this principle is known as lifnim mishurat hadin (לפנים משורת הדין), lit. "beyond the line of the law". See for elaboration, and Hashkafa for general discussion. Additional to its practical implications, the idea is foundational in the formulation of the various sub-philosophies of Orthodox Judaism. Cases where the principle is commonly applied are: returning lost property; sharing a load; damage compensation; limits of competition in business.

Its best known philosophic formulation is by both Rashi and Nachmanides in their respective Torah commentaries. Commenting on Deuteronomy 6.18 “And you shall do that which is right and good in the eyes of God.” They ask "what new instructions does this verse add"? Surely, doing what is “right and good” is already a part of the numerous injunctions already presented there. Both understand this verse to denote a level of behavior that is above the letter of the law.

Although celibacy is generally defined as a sin in Judaism, with no stated exceptions within Reform Judaism, Reform Judaism teaches that the cultural mandate is no longer necessary, so procreation between Jews within this sect of Judaism may be viewed as supererogatory acts.

== In law and moral philosophy ==
Whether an act is supererogatory or obligatory can be debated. In many schools of thought, donating money to charity is supererogatory. In other schools of thought that regard some level of charitable donation to be duty (such as with the tithe in Judaism, zakat in Islam, and similar standards in many Christian sects), only exceeding a certain level of donation (e.g. going above the common 2.5%-of-capital-assets standard in zakat) would count as supererogatory.

In criminal law, it may be observed that state prohibitions on killing, stealing, and so on derive from the state's duty to protect one's own citizens. However, a nation state has no duty to protect the citizens of an adjacent nation from crime. To send a peacekeeping force into another country would be — in the view of the nation doing it — supererogatory.

Some schools of moral philosophy do not include supererogatory acts. In utilitarianism, an act can only be better because it would bring more good to a greater number, and in that case it becomes a duty, not a supererogatory act. The lack of a notion of supererogation in utilitarianism and related schools leads to the demandingness objection, arguing that these schools are too ethically demanding, requiring unreasonable acts.

== See also ==
- Divine command theory
- Holy days of obligation
- Moral absolutism
- Mustahabb
- Orthodoxy
- Perfectionism (philosophy)
- Religiosity
- Saint
- Via media
