= Makruh =

Discouraged, but not forbidden, action in Islam

In Islamic terminology, something which is makruh or makrooh (Arabic: مكروه, transliterated: makrooh or makrūh) is "discouraged". This is one of the five categories (al-ahkam al-khamsa) in Islamic law – wajib/fard (obligatory), Mustahabb/mandub (recommended), mubah (neutral), makruh (disapproved), haram (forbidden).

Though a makruh act is not haram (forbidden) or subject to punishment, a person who abstains from this act will be rewarded. Muslims are encouraged to avoid such actions when or as possible. It is one of the degrees of approval (ahkam) in Islamic law. In the terminology of Islamic jurisprudence, "Makruh" refers to an action that is not forbidden to do, but had better to be abandoned.

Acts considered makruh can vary between different madhhabs due to differing scholarly interpretations of the Quran and Hadith, with Hanafi scholars in particular differing from the other madhhabs in regard to classification of makruh.

== Overview ==
In the principles of Islamic jurisprudence (Arabic: أصول الفقه, romanized: uṣūl al-fiqh), rulings governing actions fall into categories known as "the five rulings" (الأحكام الخمسة, al-aḥkām al-khamsa).

It is a sin or a crime to perform a forbidden action or not to perform a mandatory action. Avoiding reprehensible acts and performing recommended acts is held to be subject of reward in the afterlife, while allowed actions entail no judgement from God.

1. Obligatory (واجب, wājib or فرض, farḍ);
2. Recommended (مُسْتَحَبّ, mustaḥabb or المندوب, mandūb);
3. Neutral, that is, not involving God's judgment (مباح, mubāḥ);
4. Disliked or reprehensible (مكروه, makrūh);
5. Forbidden (حَرَام, ḥarām or محظور, maḥzūr).

Islamic jurists disagree on whether the term halal covers the first two, three, or four of these categories.

Makrūh actions are not strictly forbidden according to scholars, but are reprehensible and violate rules of fiqh. Engaging in actions that are considered makrūh does not lead to punishment, but avoiding this type of actions will bring one closer to God.

Hanafi scholars divide makrūh actions into two categories, prohibitively disliked مكروه تهرمي, makrūh tahrimi is a category that covers acts that would likely be classified as haram by other madhabs, but there is some there is some slight doubt in the chain of narration or authenticity of the Hadith that makes that particular act haram. Discouraged (مكروه تنزيهي, makrūh tanzihi) is simply what other mahdabs would call makrūh.

== Examples ==
Some of the examples of something considered makruh are the use of a great amount of water when performing ritual purifications known as the wudu (partial ablution, or abdest) and ghusl (full ablution) or the consumption of garlic before attending the mosque or socializing with others.

An example of a food which is considered makruh for Muslims of the Hanafi school is prawns (but only for the Hanafi school). Hanafis believe in refraining from consuming prawns and therefore choose to eat something else if possible. There are, however, shared attitudes within the Hanafi school of whether shrimp are considered water game and are thereby halal.

An example in regards to clothing that is considered makruh is wearing garments below the ankle. However, debate among scholars, particularly of the Maliki school, has led to some considering it haram while others maintain it is makruh.

While the wearing of silk garments and gold jewelry by men is considered haram in all other schools, the Hanafi school considers it makruh tahrimi due to doubt in the chain of narration and authenticity of the Hadith in which this evidence is sourced.

Another example of makruh tahrimi is making an offer to buy something that has an offer already placed by another person. Similarly to the rule on men and silk garments, the Hanafi school considers it makruh tahrimi since the Hadith in which the evidence is found has some doubt to the chain of narration.

Other examples of makruh acts in Islam include talking while taking ablutions for prayer and slaughtering an animal for food where other animals of its kind can see it.
