= Mustahabb =

Islamic term for religiously recommended acts

Mustahabb (Arabic: مُسْتَحَبّ, lit. 'beloved thing') or Mandub (Arabic: المندوب, lit. 'delegate') is an Islamic term referring to an action or thing that is recommended and favoured.

Mustahabb actions are those whose ruling (ahkam) in Islamic law falls between mubah (neutral; neither encouraged nor discouraged) and wajib (compulsory). One definition is "duties recommended, but not essential; fulfilment of which is rewarded, though they may be neglected without punishment". Synonyms of mustahabb include masnun and mandub. The opposite of mustahabb is makruh (discouraged).

Parallels have been drawn between the concept of mustahabb in Islamic law and the concept of supererogatory acts in the Western philosophical tradition.

== Ahkam ==
In the principles of Islamic jurisprudence (Arabic: أصول الفقه, romanized: uṣūl al-fiqh), rulings governing actions fall into categories known as "the five rulings" (الأحكام الخمسة, al-aḥkām al-khamsa).

It is a sin or a crime to perform a forbidden action or not to perform a mandatory action. Avoiding reprehensible acts and performing recommended acts is held to be subject of reward in the afterlife, while allowed actions entail no judgement from God.

1. Obligatory (واجب, wājib or فرض, farḍ);
2. Recommended (مُسْتَحَبّ, mustaḥabb or المندوب, mandūb);
3. Neutral, that is, not involving God's judgment (مباح, mubāḥ);
4. Disliked or reprehensible (مكروه, makrūh);
5. Forbidden (حَرَام, ḥarām or محظور, maḥzūr).

Islamic jurists disagree on whether the term halal covers the first two, three, or four of these categories.

== Examples ==
There are possibly thousands of mustahabb acts, including:

- Sadaqah (charity outside of zakat)
- Saying As-salamu alaykum
- Umrah (except in the Shafi'i and Hanbali madhhab, wherein it is fard)
- Saying SubhanAllah when seeing beautiful natural scenery
- Reciting the Throne Verse or Surah al-Ikhlas when walking in nature
- Observing the crescent moon
- Saying the thunder du'a' when hearing thunder
- Waking up before Fajr (rather than staying up)

== See also ==
- Ihtiyat Mustahabb
- Makruh
- Supererogation, a similar concept in Western philosophy and religion
