= Faqīh =

Expert in Islamic jurisprudence

A faqih (Arabic: فقيه, pl. فقهاء; faqīh, pl. fuqahāʔ) is an Islamic jurist, an expert in fiqh, or Islamic jurisprudence and Islamic law.

== Definition ==
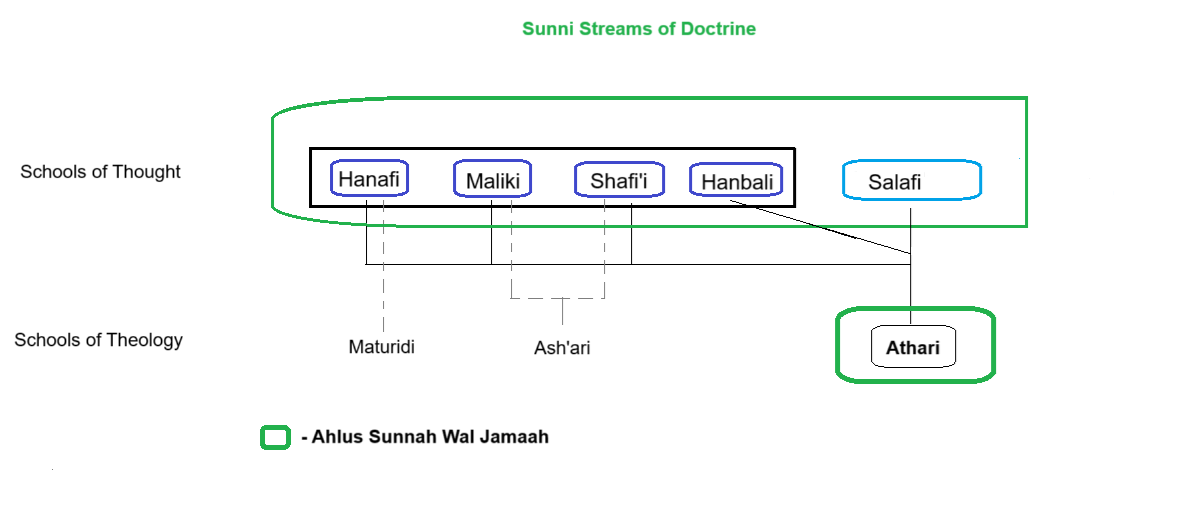
Main schools of thought within Sunni Islam, and other prominent streams.

Islamic jurisprudence or fiqh is the human understanding of Sharia, which is believed by Muslims to represent divine law as revealed in the Quran and sunnah (the practices of the Islamic prophet Muhammad). Sharia is expanded and developed by interpretation (ijtihad) of the Quran and sunnah by Islamic jurists (ulama) and implemented by the rulings (fatwas) of jurists on questions presented to them.

Fiqh deals with the observance of rituals, morals and social legislation in Islam. In the modern era there are four prominent schools (madhhab) of fiqh within Sunni practice and two (or three) within Shia practice.

The historian Ibn Khaldun describes fiqh as "knowledge of the rules of God which concern the actions of persons who own themselves bound to obey the law respecting what is required (wajib), sinful (haram), recommended (mandub), disapproved (makruh) or neutral (mubah)". This definition is consistent amongst the jurists.

== Methods of derivation ==
Methods of derivation are laid out in the books of usul al-fiqh (principles of fiqh), and the types of evidence which are deemed valid for deriving rulings from are many in number. Four of them are agreed upon by the vast majority of jurists. They are:

- The Quran
- Sunnah
- Ijma' or consensus
- Qiyas or analogy

These four types of evidence are seen as acceptable by the vast majority of jurists from both the schools of Sunni jurists (the Hanafi, Maliki, Shafi'i, and Hanbali and sometimes the Zahiriyah), as well as Shia jurists. However, Zahiriyah or Literalists do not see qiyas as valid.

While Twelver Shia see edicts of the Twelve Imams as holding the same weight as the Quran and sunnah, this is not accepted by Sunni jurists.

== Conditions for being a faqih ==
A faqih is one who has fulfilled the conditions for ijtihad either in their entirety or piecemeal. In the Sunni view it is generally held that there are no or very few jurists that have reached the level of Mujtahid Mutlaq (see below) in our day and age. In the Twelver Shia view, each of the Marja' have reached this level.

The faqih who fulfills all conditions of ijtihad is sometimes referred to as a Mujtahid Mutlaq or Unrestricted Jurist-Scholar, while one who has not reached that level generally will have mastered the methodology (usul) used by one or more of the prominent madhhab and will be able to apply this methodology to arrive at the traditional legal rulings of his/her respective madhhab. According to the Sunni Muslim website Living Islam, "There is no mujtahid mutlaq today nor even a claimant to that title."

Below the level of Mujtahid Mutlaq is the Mujtahid Muqayyad or Restricted Jurist-Scholar. A Mujtahid Muqayyad must pass rulings according to the confines of his particular madhhab (school of jurisprudence), or particular area of specialization. This is according to the view that ijtihad or the ability of legal deduction can be achieved in specified areas, and does not require a holistic grasp of the Shariah and its entailing laws and legal theory.

== Iran ==
According to Article 5 of the Constitution of the Islamic Republic of Iran, in the present time of the Major Occultation, the head of state that must administer the Ummah is required to be a faqih. He has to be god-fearing.

== See also ==
- List of Islamic studies scholars
- Grand Ayatollahs
- Sanatul Fuqaha
