= Fard =

Religious duty commanded by God in Islam

Farḍ (Arabic: فرض) or farīḍah (فريضة) or fardh in Islam is a religious duty commanded by God. The word is also used in Turkish, Persian, Pashto, Urdu, Hindi, Bangla (spelled farz or faraz), and Malay (spelled fardu or fardhu) in the same meaning. Muslims who obey such commands or duties are said to receive hasanat (حسنة), ajr (أجر) or thawab (ثواب) for each good deed.

Fard or its synonym wājib (واجب) is one of the five types of ahkam (أحكام) into which fiqh categorizes acts of every Muslim. The Hanafi fiqh, however, does not consider both terms to be synonymous, and makes a distinction between wajib and fard, the latter being obligatory and the former slightly lesser degree than being obligatory.

== Individual duty and sufficiency ==
In the principles of Islamic jurisprudence (Arabic: أصول الفقه, romanized: uṣūl al-fiqh), rulings governing actions fall into categories known as "the five rulings" (الأحكام الخمسة, al-aḥkām al-khamsa).

It is a sin or a crime to perform a forbidden action or not to perform a mandatory action. Avoiding reprehensible acts and performing recommended acts is held to be subject of reward in the afterlife, while allowed actions entail no judgement from God.

1. Obligatory (واجب, wājib or فرض, farḍ);
2. Recommended (مُسْتَحَبّ, mustaḥabb or المندوب, mandūb);
3. Neutral, that is, not involving God's judgment (مباح, mubāḥ);
4. Disliked or reprehensible (مكروه, makrūh);
5. Forbidden (حَرَام, ḥarām or محظور, maḥzūr).

Islamic jurists disagree on whether the term halal covers the first two, three, or four of these categories.

The fiqh distinguishes two sorts of duties:

- Individual duty or farḍ al-'ayn (فرض العين) is a personal requirement that each person is expected to fulfill on their own, such as daily prayer (salat), and the pilgrimage to Mecca at least once in a lifetime if the person can afford the journey (hajj). An individual not performing this will be punished in the afterlife (but can be excused on basis of incapability), but if he enjoins and fulfils its necessity will be rewarded.
- Sufficiency duty or farḍ al-kifāya (فرض الكفاية) is a duty which is imposed on the whole community of believers (ummah). The classic example for it is janaza (funeral prayer): the individual is not required to perform it as long as a sufficient number of community members fulfill it.

== Examples of fard acts ==
1. Salah (daily prayer, including Friday prayer)
2. Sawm (fasting during Ramadan)
3. Hajj (pilgrimage to Mecca, if someone is fit, safe, and financially secure enough to travel)
4. Zakat (giving alms)

== See also ==
- Ahkam, commandments, of which fard are a type
- Mitzvah, a somewhat similar Jewish concept
- Dharma, a somewhat similar Hindu/Buddhist/Sikh concept
