= Haram =

Arabic term for religiously forbidden in Islam

Haram (/həˈrɑːm, hæˈ-, hɑːˈ-, -ˈræm/; Arabic: حَرَام ḥarām [ħɑˈrɑːm]) is an Arabic term meaning sinful or prohibited.

This may refer to either something sacred to which access is not allowed to the people who are not in a state of purity or who are not initiated into the sacred knowledge; or, in direct contrast, to an evil and thus "sinful action that is forbidden to be done".

The term also denotes something "set aside", thus being the Arabic equivalent of the Hebrew concept חרם (ḥērem) and the concept of sacer (cf. sacred) in Roman law and religion. In Islamic jurisprudence, haram is used to refer to any act that is forbidden by Allah and is one of the five Islamic commandments (الأحكام الخمسة al-ʾAḥkām al-Ḵamsa) that define the morality of human action.

Acts that are haram are typically prohibited in the religious texts of the Quran and the sunnah category of haram is the highest status of prohibition. Something that is considered haram remains prohibited no matter how good the intention is or how honorable the purpose is. Sins, good, and meritorious acts are placed on the mizan (weighing scales) on the Day of Judgement and are weighed according to the sincerity of the doer.

Views of different madhhabs or legal schools of thought can vary significantly regarding what is or is not haram based on the scholarly interpretation of the core religious texts (Quran and hadith).

== Overview ==
Actions that are haram result in harm one way or another and are therefore considered a sin if carried out by a Muslim.

They ask you ˹O Prophet˺ about intoxicants and gambling. Say, “There is great evil in both, as well as some benefit for people—but the evil outweighs the benefit...”

— Surah Al-Baqara 2:219

By bringing up the word "benefit" as an opposite to "sin", verse 2:219 of the Quran clarifies that haram is that which is harmful, in opposition to that which brings benefit; therefore, sin is that which hurts others or oneself.

An Islamic principle related to haram is that if something is prohibited or forbidden, then anything that leads to it is also considered a haram act. A similar principle is that the sin of haram is not limited to the person who engages in the prohibited activity, but the sin also extends to others who support the person in the activity, whether it be material or moral support.

In the principles of Islamic jurisprudence (Arabic: أصول الفقه, romanized: uṣūl al-fiqh), rulings governing actions fall into categories known as "the five rulings" (الأحكام الخمسة, al-aḥkām al-khamsa).

It is a sin or a crime to perform a forbidden action or not to perform a mandatory action. Avoiding reprehensible acts and performing recommended acts is held to be subject of reward in the afterlife, while allowed actions entail no judgement from God.

1. Obligatory (واجب, wājib or فرض, farḍ);
2. Recommended (مُسْتَحَبّ, mustaḥabb or المندوب, mandūb);
3. Neutral, that is, not involving God's judgment (مباح, mubāḥ);
4. Disliked or reprehensible (مكروه, makrūh);
5. Forbidden (حَرَام, ḥarām or محظور, maḥzūr).

Islamic jurists disagree on whether the term halal covers the first two, three, or four of these categories.

The two types of haram are:

- الحرام لذاته, al-ḥarām li-ḏātihi – Prohibited because of its essence and harm it causes to an individual
  - Adultery, murder, theft
- الحرام لغيره, al-ḥarām li-ġayrihi – Prohibited because of external reasons that are not fundamentally harmful but are associated to something that is prohibited
  - Ill-gotten wealth obtained through sin. Examples include money earned through cheating, stealing, corruption, murder, and interest, or any means that involve harm to another human being. Also, a deal or sale during Friday's prayers (salat al-jumu'ah). It is prohibited in Islam for a Muslim to profit from such haram actions. Any believer who benefits from or lives off wealth obtained through haram is a sinner.
  - Prayer in a house, taken illegally.

The religious term haram, based on the Quran, is applied to:

- Actions, such as cursing, fornication, murder, and disrespecting one's parents
- Policies, such as riba (usury, interest)
- Certain food and drinks (See Food & intoxicants), such as pork and alcohol.
- Some halal objects, foods, or actions that are normally halal (permissible) but under some conditions become haram. For example, halal food and drinks during the day in Ramadan or a cow or another halal animal that is not slaughtered in the Islamic way and in the name of Allah (God).
- Certain inaction, such as abandoning the salah without a valid reason.
- Homosexuality, cross-dressing, and same-sex marriage.

== Culture ==
Linguistically, the root of the term haram (compare Ancient Hebrew herem, meaning 'devoted to God', 'forbidden for profane use') is used to form a wide range of other terms that have legal implications, such as hariim (a harem) and ihraam (a state of purity). In addition, the same word (haram) is used in the Quran to denote the sacred nature of the Ka'ba and the areas of Mecca, Medina, and Jerusalem. This category of sacred, holy, and inviolable also includes spouses and university campuses. As such, the legal use of the root ح-ر-م is based on an idea of boundaries between the profane and the sacred, as opposed to prohibitions, as is normally assumed.

Colloquially, the word haram takes on different meanings and operates more closely as a dichotomy with halal, which denotes the permissible. In Arabic-speaking countries, saying "haram" can mean 'what a shame' or 'what a pity' (this meaning has been adopted by Modern Hebrew slang as well and is alike to the Italian use of peccato). The term can be used formally as a method for chastising strangers who behave inappropriately, or between friends as a form of teasing. The word is also used to instruct children in how to behave by telling them that harming other children or animals is haram, among other things.

The binary concepts of halal and haram are used in a number of cultural phrases, most notably ibn (boy) al-halal and bint (girl) al-halal. These phrases are often used to refer to appropriate spouses in marriage, and stand in contrast to ibn al-haram or bint al-haram, which are used as insults. In this case, the term haram is used to mean ill-mannered or indecent, instead of strictly meaning 'unlawful'.

Halal and haram are also used in regards to money (mal). Mal al-haram means ill-gotten money, and brings destruction on those who make their living through such means.

These cultural interpretations of what is haram influence and are influenced by the legal definitions used at a local level. This means that popular conceptions of haram are partly based on formal Islamic jurisprudence and partly on regional culture, and the popular conceptions, in turn, change how the legal system defines and punishes haram actions.

== Food and intoxicants ==
In the Quran and reports by early Muslims, forbidden meat includes pork, carnivores (lions, tigers, wolves, dogs, cats, etc.), non-ruminants (donkeys and horses), animals that were slaughtered in the name of a god other than Allah, animals that died due to illness, injury, stunning, poisoning, or slaughtering not in the name of Allah. Herbivores or cud-chewing animals like cattle, deer, sheep, goats, and antelope are some examples of animals that are halal and only if they are treated like sentient beings and slaughtered painlessly while reciting the words Bismillah and Allahu Akbar. If the animal is treated poorly, or tortured while being slaughtered, the meat is haram.

The Quran states 13 foods that are haram:

1. Dead animals (carrion) - animals must die per Islamic slaughter.
2. Blood - specifically refers to flowing blood, however, the liver, spleen, and the blood remaining in meat or veins after slaughter are permitted.
3. Pork - all parts of a pig are prohibited.
4. Animals slaughtered in the name other than Allah.
5. Strangulated animals
6. Animals killed by injury
7. Fallen dead animals
8. Animals that die from another animal's horn
9. Animals killed by another animal
10. Animals slaughtered at the altar of idols
11. Wine and intoxicating substances
12. Animals incorrectly slaughtered
13. Hunting in Ihram

== Forbidden categories of actions beside dietary laws ==
=== Marriage and family rules ===
Islam is very strict in prohibiting zina, whether it be adultery or sexual intercourse between two unmarried individuals.

In terms of marriage proposals, it is considered haram for a Muslim man to propose to a divorced or widowed woman during her iddah (the waiting period during which she is not allowed to marry again). The man is able to express his desire for marriage, but cannot execute an actual proposal. It is also forbidden for a Muslim man to propose to a woman who is married to another man.

Relating to the topic of marriage, it is unholy and against the word of God to have romantic relations with someone of the same gender. This idea is not explicitly stated in the Quran, but is heavily frowned upon by the Islamic community.

In Islamic law, it is considered haram for a Muslim woman to marry a non-Muslim man. However, Muslim men can marry Christian or Jewish women.

Polygyny is permissible (a man can have up to 4 wives), but polyandry (a woman having multiple husbands) is forbidden.

==== Inheritance ====
It is considered haram for a father to deprive his children of inheritance. It is also haram for a father to deprive the women or the children of a wife who is not favorable to him an inheritance. Additionally, it is haram for one relative to deprive another relative of their inheritance through tricks.

=== Business ethics ===
Riba, any excessive addition over and above the principal, such as usury and interest, is prohibited in Islam in all forms. Interest goes against the Islamic pillar of zakat, which allows wealth to flow from the rich to the poor. Riba is prohibited because it keeps wealth in the hands of the wealthy and keeps it away from the poor. It is also believed that riba makes a person selfish and greedy.

All business and trade practices that do not result in a free and fair exchange of goods and services are considered haram, such as bribery, stealing, and gambling. Therefore, all forms of deceit and dishonesty in business are prohibited in Islam.

Many Islamic jurists and religious bodies, including Permanent Committee for Scholarly Research and Ifta of Saudi Arabia, have considered MLM trade to be haram, the reasons behind which are as follows: in this process, followings are related – exchange without labor and labor without exchange, contract on another contract or condition on another condition, similarity with riba (interest), similarity with gambling, widespread uncertainty of profits and losses, not everyone benefiting equally, financial fraud and torture, lying and exaggeration, etc.

=== Clothing and adornment ===
In Islam, both gold adornments and silk cloths are prohibited for men to wear but are permissible for women as long as they are not used to sexually attract men (other than their husbands). The prohibition of these adornments is part of a broader Islamic principle of avoiding luxurious lifestyles.

It is considered haram for both men and women to wear clothing that fails to cover the body properly (which stated in clothing guidance, the term aurat/awrah) and clothes that are transparent. Additionally, Islam prohibits excess beautifying that involves the altering of one's physical appearance. In Sunni sects, physical alterations such as tattoos, teeth filing, and cosmetic surgery are all considered haram.

Some Islamic sects also prohibit the use of gold and silver utensils and pure silk spreads in the household in order to avoid luxurious lifestyles in the home. Statues are also prohibited in homes, and some Muslims are prohibited from participating in making statues for fear of negating tawhid.

=== Shirk ===
Worshipping anyone or anything other than God, known as shirk, is the most major sin for a Muslim.

== See also ==
- Outline of Islam
- Glossary of Islam
- Index of Islam-related articles
- Ahkam
- Al-Jamia, Shi'ah text which contains all the details of haram things.
- Christian dietary laws
- Ḥ-R-M (triconsonantal root of these words in Arabic)
- Haram (site) (linguistically related Arabic word for "protected place")
- Kashrut, Jewish dietary rules
- Makruh
- Mitzvah in Judaism incorporates similar notions
- Sharia
- Treif, the Yiddish word for non-kosher
- Taboo
- Word of Wisdom (Latter Day Saints), the LDS dietary rules
- Ja'fari jurisprudence
