= Arabic name =

Arabic names have historically been based on a long naming system. Many people from Arabic-speaking and also non-Arab Muslim countries have not had given, middle, and family names but rather a chain of names. This system remains in use throughout the Arab and Muslim worlds.

== Name structure ==
=== Ism ===
The ism (اسم) is the given name, first name, or personal name; e.g. "Sami" or "Shamna". Most Arabic names have meaning as ordinary adjectives and nouns, and are often aspirational of character. For example, Muhammad means 'Praiseworthy' and Ali means 'Exalted' or 'High'.

The syntactic context will generally differentiate the name from the noun or adjective. However, Arabic newspapers will occasionally place names in brackets, or quotation marks, to avoid confusion.

In fact, the name Muhammad is so popular throughout parts of Africa, Arabia, the Middle East, South Asia and Southeast Asia, that it is often represented by the abbreviation "Md.", "Mohd.", "Muhd.", or just "M.". In India, Pakistan, Bangladesh, Malaysia, Indonesia and the Philippines, due to its almost ubiquitous use as a first name among Muslims, a person will often be referred to by their second name:

- Md. Dinar Ibn Raihan
- Mohd. Umair Tanvir
- Md. Osman

=== Nasab ===
The nasab (Arabic: نسب, lit. 'lineage') is a patronymic or matronymic, or a series thereof. It indicates the person's heritage by the word ibn (ابن "son of", colloquially bin) or bint (بنت, "daughter of"). In the 1995 book Name Studies (De Gruyter), Wolfdietrich Fischer wrote that, although the nasab was still common contemporarily, ibn and bint were omitted "in almost all Arab countries".

Ibn Khaldun (ابن خلدون) means "son of Khaldun". Khaldun is the father's personal name or, in this particular case, the name of a remote male ancestor.

ʿAmmār ibn Sumayya means "ʿAmmār son of Sumayya". Sumayya is the personal name of ʿAmmār's mother; the same person can also be identified by his father's personal name, "ʿAmmār ibn Yasir". In later Islamic periods, the nasab was an important tool for determining a child's father by describing paternity in a social (i.e., to whom the mother was legally married at the time of conception) rather than a biological sense, because the father's biological identity can be grounds for speculation. In early Islamic contexts, this function is not yet well established. This stems from a legal principle introduced by Islam regarding the legal status of children (they can only arise from marriage) and changes to waiting periods relating to divorce to establish an undisputed legal father for any child. This function only develops with Islam, meaning that one can find many Companions of the Prophet bearing a maternal nasab, as the naming conventions reflected in their names still stem from pre-Islamic attitudes and beliefs.

=== Laqab ===
The laqab (لقب), pl. alqāb (ألقاب), can be translated to English as agnomen; cognomen; nickname; title, honorific; last name, surname, family name. The laqab could be purely descriptive of a person, express admiration or be insulting and derogatory.

An example is the name of the Abbasid caliph Harun al-Rashid, which uses the Arabic definite article. Harūn is the Arabic version of the name Aaron and al-Rasheed means "the Rightly-Guided".

The laqab was used as a regnal title by the Caliphate. This was most prominent in Abbasid times, for example al-Manṣūr bi’llāh.

Another common form of laqab is that of compounds ending with al-Dīn (lit. 'of the faith' or 'of the religion'), al-Dawla ('of the State'), al-Mulk ('of the Kingdom'), or al-Islām ('of Islam'). Examples include Ṣalāḥ al-Dīn, Shams al-Dīn, Nūr al-Dīn, Izz al-Din, Nāṣir al-Dawla, Niẓām al-Mulk, Sayf al-Islām.

In ancient Arab societies, the use of a laqab was common, but today it is restricted to the surname, or family name, of birth.

=== Nisbah ===
The nisbah (نسبة) surname could be an everyday name, but is mostly the name of the ancestral tribe, clan, family, profession, town, city, country, or any other term used to show relevance. It follows a family through several generations. A demonym example is الحلبي al-Halabi, meaning that the person is originally from Aleppo or a descendant of people from Aleppo. For a profession example, الخياط al-khayyat meaning "the tailor".

The laqab and nisbah are similar in use, but they could be used simultaneously. For example: Sayf Al-Dīn Al-Halabi.

=== Kunya ===
A kunya (Arabic: كنية, kunyah) is a teknonym in Arabic names. It is a component of an Arabic name, a type of epithet, in theory referring to the bearer's first-born son or daughter. By extension, it may also have hypothetical or metaphorical references, e.g. in a nom de guerre or a nickname, without literally referring to a son or a daughter. For example, Sabri Khalil al-Banna was known as Abu Nidal, "father of struggle".

Use of a kunya implies a familiar but respectful setting.

A kunya is expressed by the use of abū (father) or umm (mother) in a genitive construction, i.e. "father of" or "mother of" as an honorific in place of or alongside given names in the Arab world.

A kunya may also be a nickname expressing the attachment of an individual to a certain thing, as in Abu Bakr, "father of the camel foal", given because of this person's kindness towards camels.

== Common naming practices ==
=== Arab Muslim ===
A common name-form among Arab Muslims is the prefix ʿabd (عبد, "servant", "worshipper") combined with the word for God (Allah), or with one of the epithets of God. For example,

- Abdullah (عبدالله "servant of God"),
- Abdulaziz (عبدالعزيز "servant of the Exalted")
- Abdulrahman (عبدالرحمن "servant of the Most Merciful")

As a mark of deference, ʿAbd is usually not conjoined with the prophet's names. Nonetheless, such names are accepted in some areas. Its use is not exclusive to Muslims and throughout all Arab countries, the name Abdul-Massih, (عبدالمسيح "servant of Christ"), is a common Christian last name.

Converts to Islam may often continue using the native non-Arabic non-Islamic names that are without any polytheistic connotation, or association.

=== Arab Christian ===
Generally, Arab Christians have names indistinguishable from Muslims, with the exception of some explicitly Islamic names such as Muhammad, which are not usually borne by Christians. Some common Christian names are:

- Arabic versions of Christian names, e.g. saints' names: Buṭrus (بطرس) for Peter, Boulos (بولس) for Paul.
- Names of Greek, Armenian, and Aramaic origin, which are also used by ethnically non-Arab Christians such as Armenians, Assyrians, or Copts.
- Use of European names, especially French and English names. This is a recent convention for Christian Arabs, which mainly started with the British and French mandates in the Levant. Examples include George Habash, Michel Aflaq, and Charles Helou.
- Names in honor of Jesus Christ:

ʿAbd Yasuʿ (masc. ) / Amat Yasuʿ (fem.) ("Servant of Jesus")
ʿAbd al-Masiḥ (masc.) / Amat al-Masiḥ (fem.) ("Servant of the Messiah")
Derivations of Maseeḥ ("Messiah"): Masūḥun ("Most Anointed"), Amsāḥ ("More Anointed"), Mamsūḥ "Anointed" and Musayḥ "Infant Christ". The root, M-S-Ḥ, means "to anoint" (as in masah) and is cognate to the Hebrew Mashiah.

== Dynastic or family name ==
Some people, especially in the Arabian Peninsula, when descendant of a famous ancestor, start their last name with Āl "family, clan" (آل), like the House of Saud ﺁل سعود Āl Suʻūd or . Āl is distinct from the definite article (ال). If a reliably-sourced version of the Arabic spelling includes آل (as a separate graphic word), then this is not a case of the definite article, so Al (capitalised and followed by a space, not a hyphen) should be used. Ahl, which has a similar meaning, is sometimes used and should be used if the Arabic spelling is أهل.

Dynasty membership alone does not necessarily imply that the dynastic آل is used – e.g. Bashar al-Assad.

| Arabic | Meaning | Transliteration | Example |
|---|---|---|---|
| ال | 'the' | al- | Maytham al-Tammar |
| آل | 'family'/'clan of' | Al | Bandar bin Abdulaziz Al Saud |
| أهل | 'tribe'/'people of' | Ahl | Ahl al-Bayt |

=== Example ===
محمد بن سلمان بن أمین الفارسي
Muḥammad ibn Salmān ibn Amīn al-Fārisī

Ism – Muḥammad (proper name, lit. 'praised')
Nasab – Salmān (father's name, lit. 'secure')
Nasab – Amīn (grandfather's name, lit. 'trustworthy')
Nisbah – al-Fārisī (lit. 'the Persian').

"Muḥammad, son of Salmān, son of Amīn, the Persian"

This person would simply be referred to as "Muḥammad" or by his kunya, which relates him to his first-born son, e.g. Abū Karīm "father of Karīm". To signify respect or to specify which Muḥammad one is speaking about, the name could be lengthened to the extent necessary or desired.

== Common mistakes ==
Non-Arabic speakers often make these mistakes:

- Separating "the X of Y" word combinations (see iḍāfah):
  - With "Abdul": Arabic names may be written "Abdul (something)", but "Abdul" means "servant of the" or "follower of the" and is not, by itself, a name. Thus for example, to address Abdul-Rahman bin Omar al-Ahmad by his given name, one says "Abdul-Rahman", not merely "Abdul". If he introduces himself as "Abdul-Rahman" (which means "the servant of the Merciful"), one does not say "Mr. Rahman" (as "Rahman" is not a family name but part of his theophoric personal name); instead it would be Mr. al-Ahmad, the latter being the family name. Therefore, it is better to write "Abdul Rahman" as "abdu r-rahmān" and "abdul ghafār" as "abdu l-ghafār" .
  - People not familiar with Arabic sandhi in iḍāfah: Habībullāh = "beloved (Habīb) of God (Allāh)"; here a person may in error report the man's name as "forename Habib, surname Ullah". Likewise, people may confuse a name such as Jalālu-d-dīn ("The majesty of the religion") as being "Jalal Uddin", or "Mr. Uddin", when "Uddin" is not a surname, but the second half of a two-word name (the desinence -u of the construct state nominative, plus the article, appearing as -d-, plus the genitive dīn[i]). To add to the confusion, some immigrants to Western countries have adopted Uddin as a surname, although it is grammatically incorrect in Arabic outside the context of the associated "first name". Even Indian Muslims commit the same error. If a person's name is Abd-ul-Rahim ("servant of the Merciful"), others may call him Mr. Abdul ("servant of the") which would sound quite odd to a native speaker of Arabic.
- Not distinguishing ʻalāʾ from Allah: Some Arabic names include the Arabic word ʻalāʾ (علاء "nobility"). Here, ⟨ʻ⟩ represents the ayin, a voiced pharyngeal fricative, ⟨ʾ⟩ represents the hamza, a glottal stop, and ⟨l⟩ is spelled and pronounced at ordinary length, /l/. In Allāh, the l is written twice (⟨ll⟩) and pronounced twice as long (a geminate), as /l/ or /ll/. In Arabic pronunciation, ʻalāʾ and Allāh are clearly different. But Europeans, Iranians, and Indians may not pronounce some Arabic sounds as a native Arabic speaker would, and thus tend to pronounce them identically. For example, the name ʻAlāʾ al-dīn (Aladdin, "the Nobility of the Faith") is sometimes misspelled as Allāh al-dīn by Europeans and Indians. There is another name ʻAlaʾ-Allah (Aliullah, "the Nobility of God"), which uses both distinctly. Therefore, the name "علاء" must be written in Latin in the form of "Halāʾ " or "Halaa'e" to differentiate it between "Allāh" the name of God in Arabic, and also the female name آلاء "Ālāʾ " (Alaa'e) Which means "blessings" (God's blessings).
- Taking bin or ibn for a middle name: As stated above, these words indicate the order of the family chain. English-speakers often confuse them with middle names, especially when they are written as "Ben", as it is the case in some countries. For example, Sami Ben Ahmed would be mistakenly addressed as Mr. Ben Ahmed. To correctly address the person, one should use Mr. Sami or Mr. Sami Ben Ahmed.
- Grammar: As between all languages, there are differences between Arabic grammar and the grammar of other languages. Arabic forms noun compounds in the opposite order from Indo-Iranian languages, for example. During the war in Afghanistan in 2002, a BBC team found in Kabul an internally displaced person whose name they stated as "Allah Muhammad". This may be a misspelling for ʻalāʾ, for if not, by the rules of Arabic grammar, this name means "the Allah who belongs to Muhammad", which, assuming the person is an Arabic speaking Muslim would be unacceptable religiously. However, by the rules of Iranian languages and most languages of India, this name does mean "Muhammad who belongs to Allah", being the equivalent of the Arabic "Muhammadullah". Most Afghans speak Iranian languages. Such Perso-Arab or Indo-Arab multilingual compound names are not uncommon in Afghanistan, Bangladesh, Iran, Pakistan and Tajikistan. There is, for example, the Punjabi name Allah-Ditta which joins the Arabic Allah with the Punjabi Ditta "given".

== Arab family naming convention ==
Conventionally, in Arab culture, as in many parts of the world, a person's ancestry and family name are very important. An example is explained below.

Assume a man is called Saleh ibn Tariq ibn Khalid al-Fulan.

- Saleh is his personal name, and the one that his family and friends would call him by.
- ibn and bin translate as "son of", so Tariq is Saleh's father's name.
- ibn Khalid means that Tariq is the son of Khalid, making Khalid the paternal grandfather of Saleh.
- al-Fulan would be Saleh's family name.

Hence, Saleh ibn Tariq ibn Khalid al-Fulan translates as "Saleh, son of Tariq, son of Khalid; who is of the family of al-Fulan."

The Arabic for "daughter of" is bint. A woman with the name Fatimah bint Abdullah ibn Omar al-Rashid translates as "Fatimah, daughter of Abdullah, son of Omar; who is of the family al-Rashid."

In this case, ibn and bint are included in the official naming. Most Arab countries today, however, do not use 'ibn' and 'bint' in their naming system. If Saleh were an Egyptian, he would be called Saleh Tariq Khalid al-Fulan and Fatimah would be Fatimah Abdullah Omar al-Rashid.

If Saleh marries a wife (who would keep her own maiden, family, and surnames), their children will take Saleh's family name. Therefore, their son Mohammed would be called Mohammed ibn Saleh ibn Tariq al-Fulan, not Mohammed ibn Saleh ibn Tariq ibn Khalid al-Fulan (too long).

However, not all Arab countries use the name in its full length, but conventionally use two- and three-word names, and sometimes four-word names in official or legal matters. Thus, the first name is the personal name, the middle name is the father's name, and the last name is the father's family name.

== Biblical names and their Arabic equivalent ==
The Arabic names listed below are used in the Arab world with correspondent Hebrew, English, Syriac and Greek equivalents in many cases. Most are derived from Syriac transliterations of the Hebrew Bible.

| Arabic name | Hebrew name | English name | Syriac name | Greek name |
|---|---|---|---|---|
| ʿĀbir /ʾĪbir عابر / إيبر | Éver ʻĒḇer עֵבֶר | Eber | ܥܵܒ݂ܵܪ ʿĀḇār | |
| Alyasaʿ اليسع | Elisha; Elišaʿ אֱלִישָׁע | Elisha | ܐܹܠܝܼܫܲܥ Ēlīšaʿ | Ἐλισσαῖος |
| ʿĀmūs عاموس | Amos ʿĀmōs עָמוֹס | Amos | ܥܵܡܘܿܣ ʿĀmōs | Ἀμώς |
| Andrāwus أندراوس | | Andrew | ܐܲܢܕܪܹܐܘܿܣ Andrēōs | Ἀνδρέας |
| ʾĀsif آصف | Asaph ʾĀsaf אָסָף | Asaph | ܐܵܣܵܦ ʾĀsāp | |
| ʾAyyūb أيّوب | Iyov / Iov; Iyyov / Iyyôḇ איוב | Job | ܐܝܼܘܿܒ݂ Īyōḇ | Ἰώβ |
| ʾĀzar; Āzar / Taraḥ آزر / تارح | Téraḥ / Tharakh תֶּרַח / תָּרַח | Terah | ܬܲܪܚ Tar(ə)ḥ | Θάρα |
| Azarīyā أزريا | Azaryah עֲזַרְיָהוּ | Azariah | ܥܲܙܲܪܝܵܐ Azar(ə)yā | |
| Barthulmāwus بَرثُولَماوُس | bar-Tôlmay בר-תולמי | Bartholomew | ܒܲܪ ܬܘܼܠܡܲܝ Bar-Tūlmay | Βαρθολομαῖος |
| Baraka; Bārak بارك | Barukh; Bārûḵ בָּרוּךְ | Baruch | ܒܵܪܘܿܟ݂ Bārōḵ | Βαρούχ |
| Binyāmīn بنيامين | Binyamin; Binyāmîn בִּנְיָמִין | Benjamin | ܒܸܢܝܵܡܹܝܢ Benyāmēn | Βενιαμίν |
| Būlus بولس | | Paul | ܦܲܘܠܘܿܣ Pawlōs | Παῦλος |
| Butrus بطرس | | Peter | ܦܸܛܪܘܿܣ Peṭrōs | Πέτρος |
| Dabūrāh دبوراه | Dvora; Dəḇôrā דְּבוֹרָה | Deborah | ܕܒ݂ܘܿܪܵܐ D(ə)ḇōrā | Δεββώρα |
| Dānyāl دانيال | Daniel; Dāniyyêl דָּנִיֵּאל | Daniel | ܕܵܢܝܼܐܹܝܠ Dānīyyēl | Δανιήλ |
| Dāwud / Dāwūd / Dāʾūd داود / داوُود / داؤود | David; Davīd דָּוִד | David | ܕܵܘܝܼܕ݂ Dāwīḏ | Δαυίδ, Δαβίδ |
| Fīlīb/Fīlībus فيليب / فيليبوس | | Philip | ܦܝܼܠܝܼܦܘܿܣ Pīlīpōs | Φίλιππος |
| Fāris فارص | Péreẓ; Pāreẓ פֶּרֶץ / פָּרֶץ | Perez | ܦܲܪܨ Parṣ | |
| ʾIfrāym إفرايم | Efraim; Efráyim אֶפְרַיִם/אֶפְרָיִם | Ephraim | ܐܲܦܪܹܝܡ Ap̄rēm | Ἐφραίμ |
| Ḥūbāb حُوبَابَ | Chobab; Ḥovav חֹבָב | Hobab | | |
| Ḥabaqūq حبقوق | Ḥavaqquq חֲבַקּוּק | Habakkuk | | Ἀββακούμ |
| Ḥajjai حجاي | Ḥaggay חַגַּי | Haggai | | Ἁγγαῖος |
| Ānnāh آنّاه | Ḥannāh חַנָּה | Anna | | Ἄννα |
| Hārūn هارون | Aharon אהרן | Aaron | | Ἀαρών |
| Ḥawwāʾ حواء | Chava / Hava; Ḥavvah חַוָּה | Eve | ܚܘܐ Hwuh*/Khwuh* | Εὔα |
| Hūshaʾ هوشع | Hoshea; Hôšēăʻ הושע | Hosea | | Ὡσηέ |
| Ḥassan حسن | Choshen ẖošen חֹשֶׁן | Hassan | | |
| Ḥazqiyāl حزقيال | Y'khez'qel; Y'ḥez'qel יְחֶזְקֵאל | Ezekiel | | Ἰεζεκιήλ |
| ʾIbrāhīm إبراهيم | Avraham אַבְרָהָם | Abraham | | Ἀβραάμ |
| Idrees / Akhnookh; Idrīs / Akhnūkh أخنوخ / إدريس | H̱anokh חֲנוֹךְ | Enoch / Idris | | Ἑνώχ |
| ʾIlyās / ʾIlyāsīn / Īliyā إلياس / إل ياسين / إيليا | Eliahu / Eliyahu; Eliyahu אֱלִיָּהוּ | Elijah | 'Eliya | Ἠλίας |
| ʾImrān عمرام / عمران | Amrām עַמְרָם | Amram | | Ἀμράμ |
| ʾIrmiyā إرميا | Yirməyāhū יִרְמְיָהוּ | Jeremiah | | Ἱερεμίας |
| ʿĪsā / Yasūʿ عيسى / يسوع | Yeshua; Yešuaʿ יֵשׁוּעַ / יֵשׁוּ | Jesus | Eeshoʿ | Ἰησοῦς |
| Ǧūšiyā جوشيا | Yôšiyyāhû יֹאשִׁיָּהוּ | Josiah | | Ιωσιας |
| ʾIsḥāq إسحاق | Yitzhak / Yitzchak; Yitsḥaq יִצְחָק | Isaac | | Ἰσαάκ |
| ʾIshʻiyāʾ إشعيا | Yeshayahu; Yəšạʻyā́hû יְשַׁעְיָהוּ | Isaiah | | Ἠσαΐας |
| Ismail ʾIsmāʿīl إسماعيل | Yishmael; Yišmaʿel / Yišmāʿêl יִשְׁמָעֵאל | Ishmael | | Ἰσμαήλ |
| ʾIsrāʾīl إِسرائيل | Israel / Yisrael; Yisraʾel / Yiśrāʾēl ישראל | Israel | | Ἰσραήλ |
| Ǧibrīl / Gibril / Ǧibra'īl جِبْريل / جَبْرائيل | Gavriel; Gavriʾel גַבְרִיאֵל | Gabriel | | Γαβριήλ |
| Ǧād / Jād جاد | Gad גָּד | Gad | | Γάδ |
| Ǧālūt / Jālūt / Julyāt جالوت / جليات | Golyāṯ גָּלְיָת | Goliath | | Γολιάθ |
| Ǧašam / Ǧūšām جشم / جوشام | Geshem גֶשֶׁם | Geshem (Bible) | Gashmu | |
| Ǧūrğ / Ǧirğis / Ǧurğ / Ǧurayğ جيرجس | | George | | Γεώργιος |
| Kilāb / Kalb كلاب/ كلب | Kalev כָּלֵב | Caleb | | |
| Lāwī لاوي | Lēvî לֵּוִי | Levi | | Λευΐ |
| Layā'ليا | Leah לֵאָה | Leah | | Λεία |
| Madyān مدين | Midian מִדְיָן | Midian | | Μαδιάμ |
| Majdalā مجدلية | Migdal | Magdalene | Magdala | Μαγδαληνή |
| Māliki-Ṣādiq ملكي صادق | Malki-ṣédeq מַלְכִּי־צֶדֶֿק | Melchizedek | | Μελχισεδέκ |
| Malākhī ملاخي | Mal'akhi מַלְאָכִי | Malachi | | Μαλαχίας |
| Maryam / Miriam مريم | Miriam / Miryam; Miryam מרים | Mary | ܡܪܝܡ | Μαρία |
| Mattūshalakh مَتُّوشَلَخَ | Mətušélaḥ; Mətušálaḥ מְתֿוּשָלַח | Methuselah | | Μαθουσάλας |
| Mattā | Amittai אֲמִתַּי | Amittai | | |
| Mattā / Matatiyā متى / متتيا | Matitiahu / Matityahu; Matityahu מַתִּתְיָהוּ | Matthew | Mattai | Ματθαῖος |
| Mikāʼīl / Mikaal / Mikhāʼīl ميكائيل / ميكال / ميخائيل | Michael / Mikhael; Miḵaʾel מִיכָאֵל | Michael | | Μιχαήλ |
| Mūsā موسى | Moshe; Mošé מֹשֶׁה | Moses | | Μωυσῆς |
| Nahamiyyā نحميا | Neḥemyah נְחֶמְיָה | Nehemiah | | Νεεμίας |
| Nūḥ نُوح | Noach / Noah; Nóaḥ נוֹחַ | Noah | | Νῶε |
| Qarūn / Qūraḥ قارون / قورح | Kórakh; Qōraḥ קֹרַח | Korah | | |
| Rāḥīl راحيل | Rakhél; Raḥel רָחֵל | Rachel | | Ραχήλ |
| Ṣafnīyā صفنيا | Tzfanya / Ṣəp̄anyā; Tsfanya צְפַנְיָה | Zephaniah | | Σωφονίας |
| Ṣaffūrah صفورة | Tzipora / Tsippora; Ṣippôrā צִפוֹרָה | Zipporah | | Σεπφώρα |
| Sām سام | Shem שֵם | Shem | | Σήμ |
| Sāmirī سامري | Zimri זִמְרִי | Zimri | Zamri | |
| Samuel; Ṣamu’īl / Ṣamawāl صموئيل / صموال | Shmu'el / Šəmûʼēl; Shmu'el שְׁמוּאֶל | Samuel | | Σαμουήλ |
| Sārah سارة | Sara / Sarah; Sarā שָׂרָה | Sarah / Sara | | Σάρα |
| Shamshūn شمشون | Shimshon / Šimšôn; Shimshon שִׁמְשׁוֹן | Samson | | Σαμψών |
| Suleiman; Sulaymān / سليمان | Shlomo; Šlomo שְׁלֹמֹה | Solomon | | Σολομών |
| Saul; Ṭālūt / Šāwul طالوت / شاول | Sha'ul; Šāʼûl שָׁאוּל | Saul | | Σαούλ |
| Ṭūmās/Tūmā طوماس / توما | | Thomas (name) | Te'oma | Θωμᾶς |
| Obaidullah ʻUbaydallāh / ʻUbaydiyyā عبيد الله / عبيدييا | Ovadia ʻOvádyah / ʻOvádyah עבדיה | Obadiah | | Ὁβαδίας, Ἀβδιού |
| ʻAmri عمري | Omri ʻOmri עמרי | Omri | | |
| ʻUzāir عُزَيْرٌ | Ezra; Ezrá עזרא | Ezra | | |
| Yaʿqūb يَعْقُوب | Yaakov; Yaʿaqov יַעֲקֹב | Jacob, (James) | | Ἰακώβ |
| Yaḥyā / Yūḥannā** يحيى / يوحنا | Yochanan / Yohanan; Yôḥānnān יוחנן | John | | Ἰωάννης |
| Yahwah يهوه | YHWH; Yahweh יְהֹוָה | Jehovah | ܝܗܘܗ, ܝܗ, ܞ YH, YHWH | |
| Yessa; Yashshā يَسَّى | Yishay יִשַׁי | Jesse | | Ἰεσσαί |
| Yathrun (?); Yathrun / Shu'ayb / شعيب | Yitro; Yiṯrô יִתְרוֹ | Jethro | | |
| You'il; Yūʾīl يوئيل | Yoel יואל) | Joel | | Ἰωήλ |
| Younos / Younes / Yūnus/Yūnān يونس /يونان. | Yona / Yonah; Yônā יוֹנָה | Jonah | Yuna | Ἰωνάς |
| Youssof / Youssef; Yūsuf / يوسف | Yosef יוֹסֵף | Joseph | ܝܲܘܣܸܦ Yawsep̄ | Ἰωσήφ |
| Youshaʿ; Yūshaʿ / Yashūʿ يُوشَعُ / يَشُوعُ | Yĕhôshúa; Yôshúa יְהוֹשֻׁעַ | Joshua | | Ἰησοῦς |
| Zakaria; Zakariyyā / Zakarīyā زَكَرِيَّا | Zecharia /Zekharia; Zeḵaryah זְכַרְיָה | Zachary or Zechariah | | Ζαχαρίας |

- The popular romanization of the Arabized and Hebrew names are written first, then the standardized romanization are written in oblique. Arabized names may have variants.
- If a literal Arabic translation of a name exists, it will be placed after the final standardized romanization.
- If an Arabic correlation is ambiguous, (?) will be placed following the name in question.
- El, the Hebrew word for strength/might or deity, is usually represented as īl in Arabic, although it carries no meaning in classical and modern Arabic. The only exception is its usage in the Iraqi Arabic.

Some names might have different translations based on religious context:

- There are two versions of the name Jesus: Yasuʿ (يَسُوع) is the Christian version, as used in the Bible, while ʿĪsa (عِيسَى) is the Muslim version, as used in the Qur'an.
  Similarly, there are two versions of the name John: Yuḥannā (يُوحَنَّا) is the Christian version, while Yaḥya (يَحْيَى) is the Muslim version. They have different triconsonantal roots: Ḥ-N-N ("grace") vs Ḥ-Y-Y ("life"). Yuḥannā is cognate with the original Hebrew Yôḥānān (יוֹחָנָן). Note that Yuḥannā may refer to either John the Baptist or John the Apostle, whereas Yaḥya refers specifically to John the Baptist.

== Arabic names in English ==
Often Arabic names can be spelled multiple ways in English, and sometimes a person's name may be treated inconsistently. For example, the American boxer Muhammad Ali and the crown prince of Saudi Arabia Mohammed bin Salman share the same name, but their English spellings differ.

== Indexing ==
According to the Chicago Manual of Style, Arabic names are indexed by their surnames. Names may be alphabetized under Abu, Abd and ibn, while names are not alphabetized under al- and el- and are instead alphabetized under the following element.

== See also ==
- List of Arabic star names
- List of Arabic place names
- Nisba (onomastics)
- Kunya (Arabic)
