= Wudu =

Islamic ritual washing before prayer

Wuduʾ (Arabic: وضوء, romanized: wuḍūʾ, lit. 'ablution' [wʊˈdˤuːʔ]) is the procedure for cleansing parts of the body, a type of ritual purification by ablution, in Islam. The steps of wudu are: washing the hands, rinsing the mouth and nose, washing the face, then the forearms, then wiping the head and ears, then washing or wiping the feet, done in order without any long breaks between them.

Wudu is an important part of ritual purity in Islam and is governed by fiqh, which specifies hygienical jurisprudence and defines the rituals that constitute it. Ritual purity is called tahara.

Wudu is typically performed before Salah or reading the Quran. Activities that invalidate wudu include urination, defecation, flatulence, deep sleep, light bleeding (depending on madhhab), menstruation, postpartum status, and sexual intercourse.

Wudu is often translated as 'partial ablution', as opposed to ghusl, which refers to 'full ablution', where the whole body is washed. An alternative to wudu is tayammum 'dry ablution', which uses clean sand or dust in place of water due to complete water scarcity or when one is suffering from moisture-induced skin inflammation, illness, or other harmful effects.

== Description of Wudu ==
=== Quran ===
Qur'an 2:222 says: "For God loves those who turn to Him constantly and He loves those who keep themselves pure and clean."^{[2:222]}

Qur'an 5:6 says: "O believers! When you rise up for prayer, wash your faces and your hands up to the elbows, wipe your heads, and wash your feet up to the ankles. And if you are in a state of full impurity, then take a full bath. But if you are ill, on a journey, or have relieved yourselves, or have been intimate with your wives and cannot find water, then purify yourselves with clean earth by wiping your faces and hands. It is not Allah's Will to burden you, but to purify you and complete His favor upon you, so perhaps you will be grateful."^{[5:6]}

=== Fiqh (Islamic jurisprudence) ===
Wudu by itself is mustahabb, a recommended act (مستحب), but it becomes obligatory in special conditions such as prayer, reading the Quran, tawaf, etc.

=== Description in Hadith ===
Abu Hurairah narrated in a Hadith, discussing the Day of Resurrection, that Muhammad, when asked if he would be able to recognize Muslims, said: "Yes, you would have a mark which other people will not have. You would come to me with a white blaze on your foreheads and white marks on your feet because of the traces of ablution."

Muhammad said that "Cleanliness is a part of faith."

Abu Hurairah said: "I have heard the prophet (may peace be upon him) say, 'In a believer, adornment would reach the places where ablution reaches.'"

Uthman stated that Muhammad said: "He who performed ablution well, his sins would come out from his body, even coming out from under his nails."

Umar reported that Muhammad said: "No one among you does wuḍūʾ and does wuḍūʾ thoroughly – or adequately – and then testifies, 'There is no god but Allah Alone with no partner and I testify that Muhammad is Allah's Messenger', without the eight doors of the Garden being opened to him so that he can enter by whichever of them he wishes."

== Wudu requirements ==
=== Types of water ===
Permitted

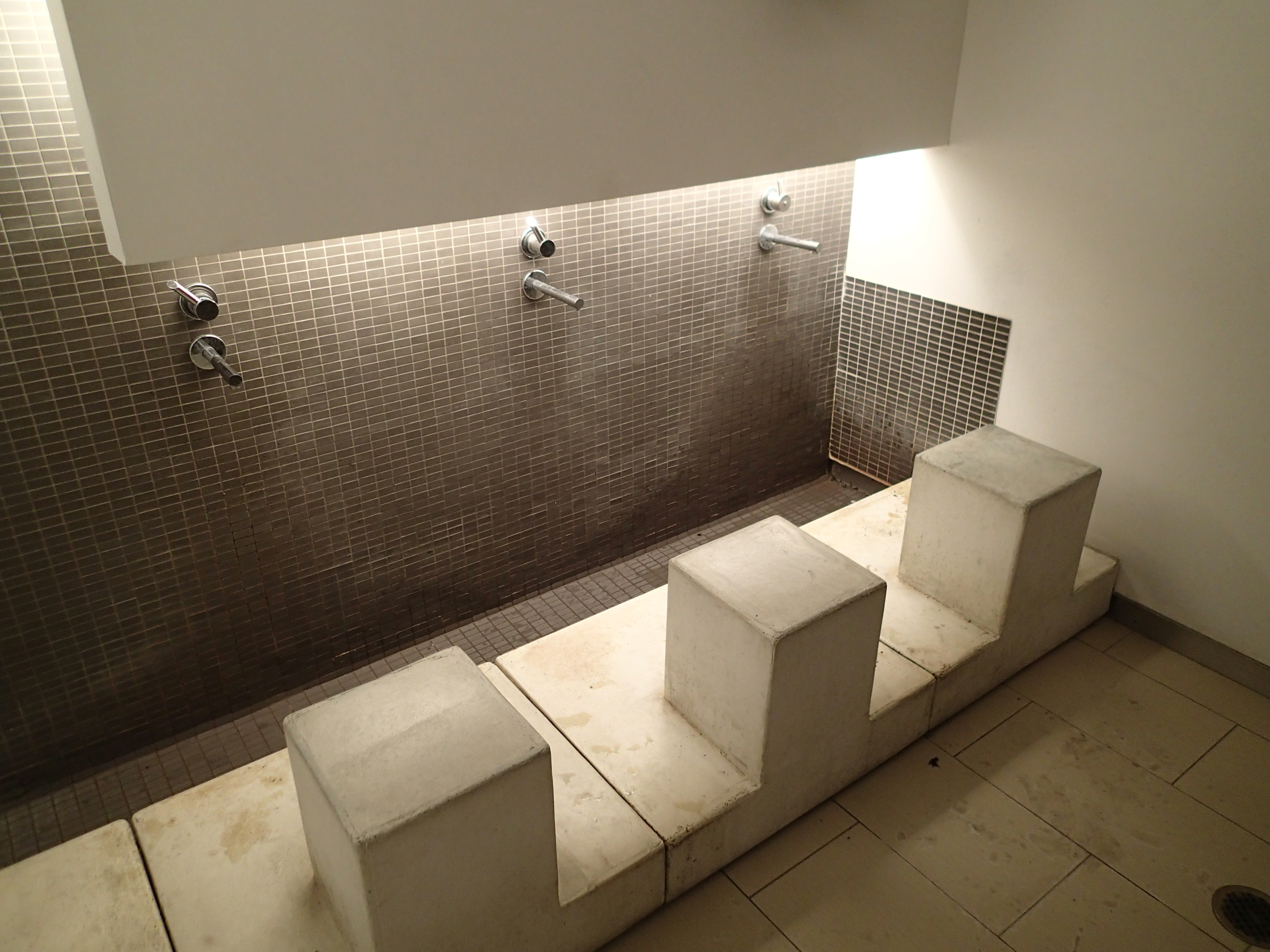
Male Ablution Facility at University of Toronto's Multifaith Centre.

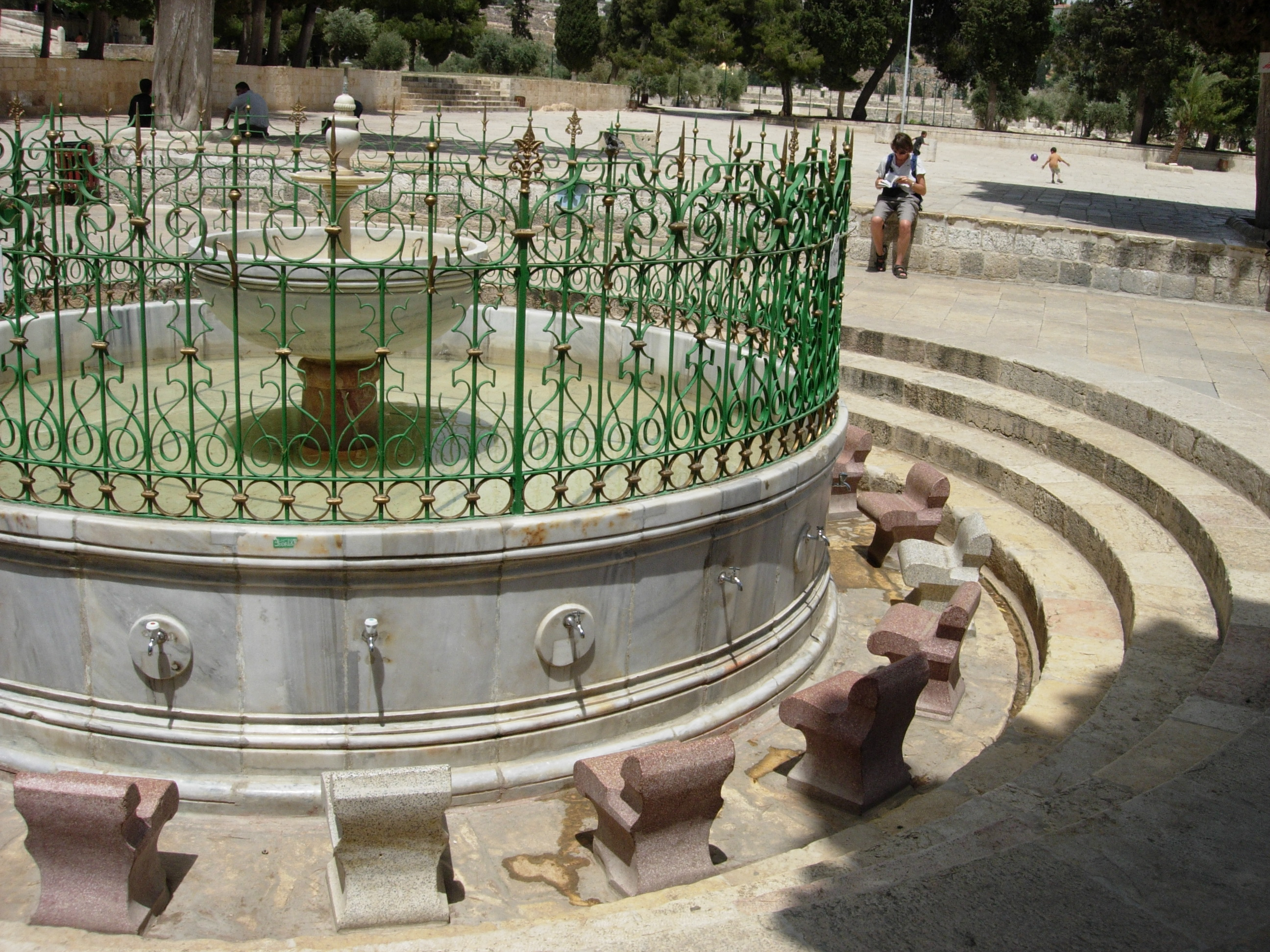
The al-Kas ablution fountain in the Al-Aqsa Mosque

The water of Wudu must be muṭlaq, meaning pure or unmixed (not necessarily chemically pure). The name of a liquid that is normally regarded by individuals as water.

- Melted snow or hail
- Water of ocean, lakes or ponds.
- Well water
- Fountain water
- Tap water

Prohibited

- Green water (green water usually means dirty water)
- Water made from any trees or fruits
- Water which contains urine, blood, or stool, or has been touched by a live or a dead animal
- Used water of wuḍūʾ or ghusl according to the Hanbali school

Other acts performed during wuḍūʾ and the detailed acts of the wuḍūʾ can be classed into three types:

=== Farā'id according to Sunni Muslims ===
The obligation of the following actions is debated among the schools of fiqh, though if not deemed obligatory they are considered recommended:

- Intention, i.e. resolving in the heart that one is performing wudu as an act of worship rather than an ordinary cleaning activity. This is obligatory in the Maliki, Shafi'i and Hanbali schools.
- Performing wudu in consecutive actions, i.e. there should not be prolonged pauses during the ritual. This is considered obligatory in the Maliki and Hanbali schools.
- Performing the actions of wudu in order, i.e. washing the face then arms then wiping the head and finally washing the feet. This is obligatory in the Shafi'i and Hanbali schools.
- Wiping the ears. This is mandatory in the Hanbali school.
- Rubbing the washed organs while washing. This is obligatory in the Maliki school.
- Rinsing the mouth and nose during wudu. This is obligatory in the Hanbali school.
- Saying the basmala at the beginning of wudu. This is obligatory in the Hanbali school.

It is not sufficient for one to pass wet hand over the feet. Under certain conditions, it can be done over slippers or traditional leather footwear called khuffayn.

=== Farā'id according to Shia Muslims ===
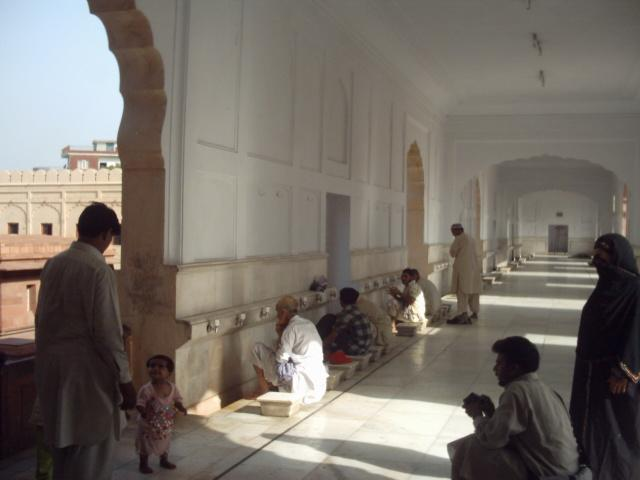
People washing before prayer at the Badshahi Mosque in Lahore, Pakistan

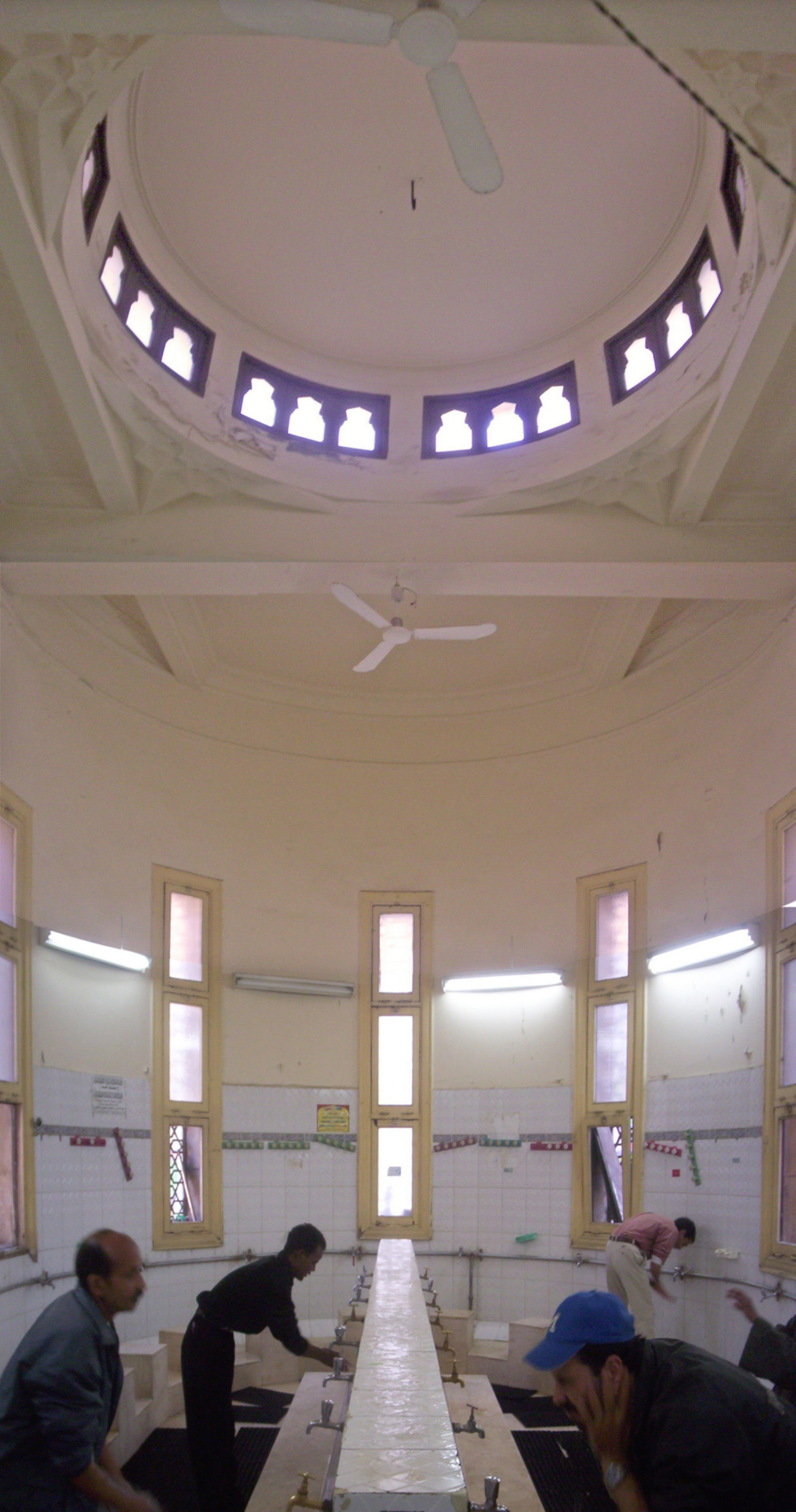
Muslims performing ablution prior to Salah or other prayers in Alexandria, Egypt

Shi'a Muslims also believe the Qur'anic mandate for wuḍūʾ comes in the sixth ayat of al-Ma'idah. The āyah has been translated by Muhammad Habib Shakir.

O ye who believe! when ye prepare for prayer, wash your faces, and your hands (and arms) to the elbows; Rub your heads (with water); and your feet to the ankles. If ye are in a state of ceremonial impurity, bathe your whole body. But if ye are ill, or on a journey, or one of you cometh from offices of nature, or ye have been in contact with women, and ye find no water, then take for yourselves clean sand or earth, and rub therewith your faces and hands, Allah doth not wish to place you in a difficulty, but to make you clean, and to complete His favour to you, that ye may be grateful.

— Al-Ma'idah 5:6

- Washing the face once or twice with your right hand
- Washing both arms, including the elbows, once or twice (the left hand washes the right arm and then right-hand washes the left arm)
- Wiping a fourth of the head with the water left on your right hand
- Wiping both feet once with the water remaining on both hands (right hand, right foot; left hand, left foot)

=== Mustahabbāt (recommended acts) ===
There are a handful of recommended acts, but if omitted, the wudu is still valid:

- Reciting the shahada after the ablution
- During wudu, one should not engage in worldly talk
- Choosing a clean place for ablution
- Not wasting water in ablution
- Starting from the right side and then the left
- Doing any dhikr, such as istighfar

== Performance ==
=== Wudu in Sunnism ===
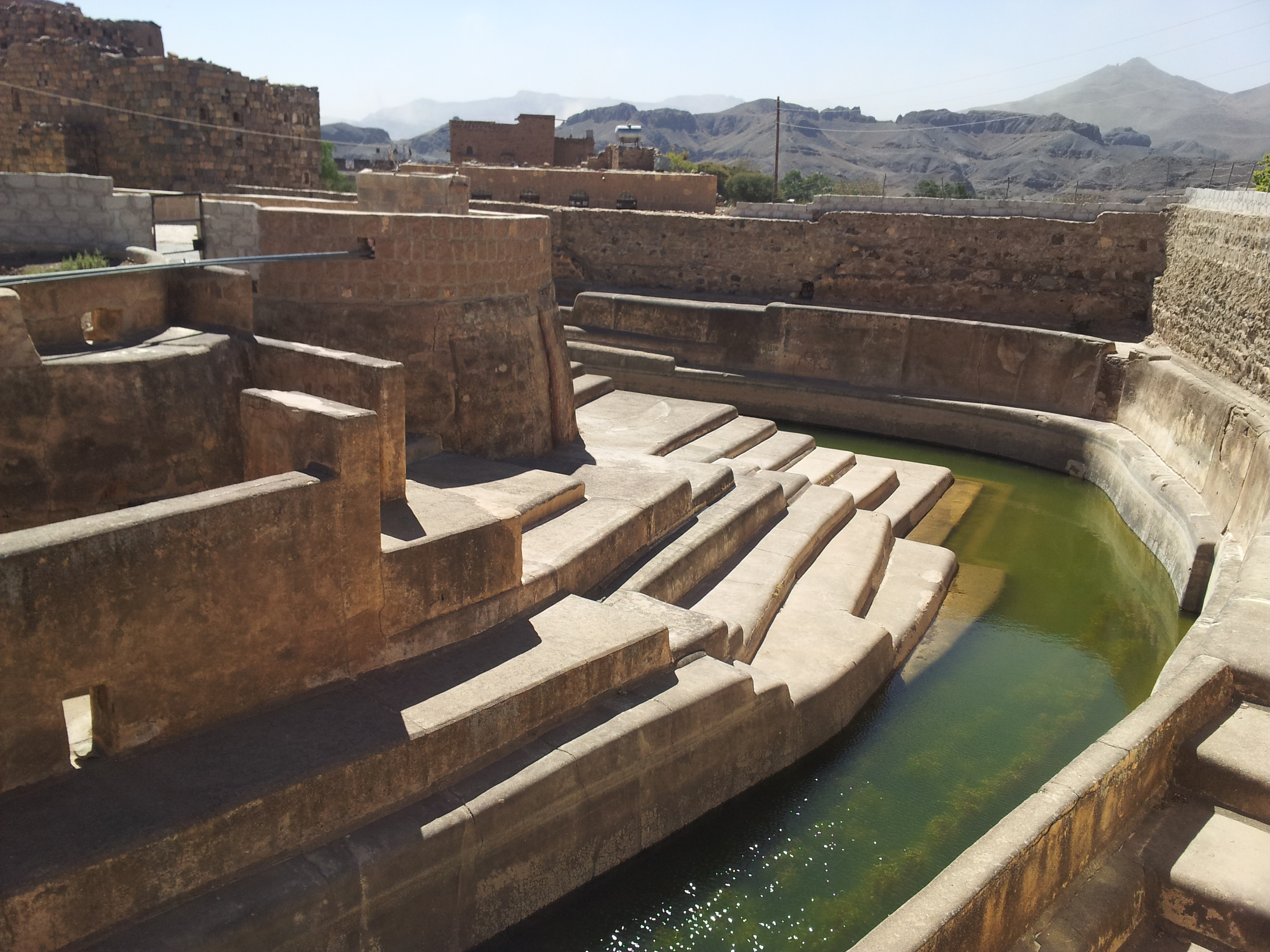
Water System for Wudu, Tayba, Yemen

Sunni Muslims generally perform the following:

1. Make intention to perform wudu
2. Recite the basmala
3. Wash both hands up to the wrist (and between the fingers) up to three times, starting with the right hand first. (Note: Washing 3 times is the sunnah and is what most people follow, but doing it once or twice is allowed.)
4. Gargle water in their mouth and spit out the water (three times)
5. Some water should be taken in the right hand and sniffed into the nostrils thrice and then blown out. (Note: The mouth and nose are rinsed together with three handfuls according to the Hanbali and Shafi'i schools and separating them is not recommended according to these schools. Separating these actions is recommended according to the Maliki and Hanafi schools.)
6. Wash the entirety of the face (from the hairline to the chin and be sure to run your fingers through your beard, if the person has one). If any strands of hair fall over the face, they are not moved aside as it is sunnah to dap the wet hands over the strands.
7. Wash the entire right forearm, including the hand, up to and including the elbow (up to three times); then the left arm (up to three times). Pass fingers of one hand between the fingers of the other hand to ensure no part is left dry. Rings and bracelets should be removed to ensure no part of the hands are dry and this applies to certain kinds of earrings as well.
8. Perform masah of head. Wet hands should be passed all over and through the hair to the ends of the hair. One may not make masah over a Muslim head cap.
9. Then (without washing the hands) the index fingers of the right and left hands should be used to clean the bends of the right and left ears (simultaneously) and in the same operation, the thumbs should be used to clean the back of the ears
10. Both feet starting from the right are washed from the toes up to and including the ankles three times.

After wudu, it is recommended to recite the Shahadah:

Arabic: أَشْهَدُ أَنْ لَا إِلَهَ إلَّا اللهُ وَحْدَهُ لَا شَرِيكَ لَهُ، وَأَشْهَدُ أَنَّ مُحَمَّداً عَبْدُهُ وَرَسُولُهُ

Transliteration: Ash-hadu "an la "ilaha "illallahu wahdahu la sharika lahu wa "ash-hadu "anna Muhammadan 'abduhu wa Rasuluhu.

Translation: I bear witness that none has the right to be worshipped but Allah alone, Who has no partner; and I bear witness that Muhammad is His slave and His Messenger.

— Sunan an-Nasa'i 148, Sahih Muslim 234b

- Then one may recite this Dua:

Arabic: اللَّهُمَّ اجْعَلْنِي مِنَ التَّوَّابِينَ وَاجْعَلْنِي مِنَ الْمُتَطَهِّرِينَ

Transliteration: Allahummaj 'alni minat-tawwabina waj'alni minal-mutatahhirin.

Translation: O Allah, make me among those who turn to You in repentance, and make me among those who are purified.

— Tirmidhi 55

Any part of the body that has not been washed, cleaned or dried improperly can be redone.

== Invalidation ==
Wudu tap at Macau Mosque, Macau, China

Theoretically, one can perform one wudu for Salah and this wudu would be considered valid for the rest of the day, unless you nullify it by certain means. Muslims believe that certain acts invalidate the wudu (often referred to as 'breaking wudu' and 'losing wudu'), although the Qur'an does not explain most of these, and rules differ among schools.

=== According to Sunni Muslims ===
According to Sunni Islam, the following invalidate wudu:

- Slow-wave sleep while reclining
- Sleeping with the help of support (Note: Sleeping while standing or sitting without taking any kind of support does not break wudu.)
- Loss of senses
- Fainting
- Defecation or urination
- Odorous or audible emissions of flatulence
- Ejaculation of semen (Note: Performing wudu alone is insufficient; ghusl is obligatory.)
- Vomiting
- Touching the private parts with the bare hands (Note: Does not apply to the Hanafi madhhab.)
- Blood or pus leaving the body so that it leaves the point of exit (Note: However if the blood or pus exits from the genitalia then any amount breaks wuḍūʾ.) (Note: According to Shafi'i Madhhab, bleeding from any part of the body, except genitalia, does not invalidate wuḍūʾ.)

=== According to Shia Muslims ===
According to Shia theology, the following invalidate wudu:

- Defecation or urination
- Odorous or audible emissions of flatulence
- Ejaculation of semen
- When someone falls into a deep sleep in which they have no alert consciousness
- Anything that causes loss of one's consciousness such as craze, drunkenness, or anesthesia
- anything that needs Ghusl such as being Junub or touching a corpse under special circumstances

Belching and vomiting do not invalidate wudu; however, it is strongly recommended that the individual rinses their mouth following the latter. Bleeding is not considered to invalidate wudhu either, as Ja'far al-Sadiq made it clear in Hadith that a bad wound is not caused to repeat wudhu. This concept further extends to parasites that may exit the body through the two extremities. Cutting one's hair or nails does not invalidate wudhu, but they should wipe the area with water.

== Alternatives ==
Muslims who are unable to perform wudu due to skin disease, a disability, or a lack of clean water, etc. are advised to perform tayammum, sometimes called dry ablution, using sand or dust instead of water. Such ritual purity may also be accepted in cases in weather where it would be dangerous.

Tayammum is also to be performed when one is defiled and could not perform ghusl.

== See also ==
- Sabil, a public water fountain in Islamic countries or near mosques
- Shadirvan, a typical Ottoman fountain usually built in the yard or at the entrance of religious buildings (mosques, khanqahs, madrasas) and caravanserais
- Water in fiqh
- Ritual purification
- Chōzuya, a Shinto water ablution pavilion
- Rishama, washing of the face and limbs before prayers in Mandaeism
