= Avrahami =

Avrahami is a surname derived from the given name Abraham. Notable people with this surname or patronymic include:

- Gad Avrahami, Israeli composer
- Tali Avrahami, Israeli filmmaker, producer, entertainer, and educator; a Chabad hasidic woman
- Yossi Avrahami, a victim of 2000 Ramallah lynching
