= Water in fiqh =

Prottoy Wajid Second 10

Water in Fiqh (Islamic jurisprudence) is divided into two types, Mutlaq and Mudaf for Tahara. Tahara or Taharah (the opposite of Najis) is an essential aspect of Islam. It means to remove all physical impurities (Najāsat) that blocks valid worship by Wudu or Ghusl.

== Water divisions in Fiqh ==
Water in Fiqh (Islamic jurisprudence) is divided into two types:

- Mutlaq
- Mudaf (Mudaaf or Mudhaf)

َAccording to Fiqh, Taharah (Wudu or Ghusl) is valid only with Mutlaq Water.

== Mutlaq ==
=== Etymology ===
Mutlaq is an Arabic word that means to absolute or pure. The word means is used by Fiqh (Islamic jurisprudence) to refer to pure water.

=== Definition in Fiqh (Islamic jurisprudence) ===
Mutlaq water is the same natural water when it fall out of the sky or coming out of the earth. In Fiqh, natural water is called Mutlaq water when no adjective or anything is added to the water which would change its natural condition. Water is still called Mutlaq water if it stays pure during the change such as e.g. mud, soil, stagnation, fallen leaves or collection of straw, etc., or the salt, sulfur, and other minerals that it contains at its source or picks up in its course.

Muslims can use Mutlaq water to wudu, ghusl, or any worship that needs to purity themselves.

=== Type of Mutlaq water ===
The types of Mutlaq water are as follows:

- Kurr water: is a certain quantity of Mutlaq water (480 kg) that does not become Najis (impure) if it comes in contact with Najis things, also Kurr water can purge Najis things.
- Qalil Water: is a specific quantity of water that is lesser than kurr water and is not Surface runoff or well water. Qalil water becomes Najis If it comes into contact with Najis.
- Surface runoff (overland flow): is the flow of water occurring on the ground surface. Runoff includes the following:
1. Rainwater
2. Snow
3. Hail
4. Spring
5. River
- Water of Well
- Seawater

== Mudaf ==
=== Etymology ===
Mudaf (Mudaaf or Mudhaf) is an Arabic word that comes to comes from 'idaafa'. Mudaf means the thing annexed. The word means is used by Fiqh (Islamic jurisprudence) to refer to mixed water.

=== Definition in Fiqh (Islamic jurisprudence) ===
Mudaf water is a kind of water to which something has been added or It is not so pure that people no longer call it water. Mudaf water is used against Mutlaq water. Wudu and Ghusl are not valid with Mudaf water. Also, it cannot make clean what has become Najis.

=== Type of Mudaf water ===
some examples of Mudaf water is as follows: Extremely muddy water, rosewater, water extracted from fruits, lime and grape juice, rose-water and soda-water.

== See also ==
- Tayammum
- Salah
- Tasbih
