= Zimri =

Zimri may refer to:

- Either of two people in the Bible:
  - Zimri (prince), the Prince of the Tribe of Simeon during the time when the Israelites were in the desert
  - Zimri (king), King of Israel after Elah and before Omri
- Zimri (nation), a nation mentioned in the Book of Jeremiah
- Zimri (tribe), a Pashtun tribe in Pakistan
- Leah Horowitz (runner) (Leah Horowitz-Zimri, born 1933), Israeli Olympic hurdler
- Zimri D. Thomas (1809–1892), American politician
