= Gad (name) =

In the Bible, Gad was the son of Jacob and the founder of the tribe of Gad. Gad is a surname, masculine given name and nickname which may refer to:

== Given name ==
- Gad al-Haq (1917–1996), Egyptian Grand Imam of Al-Azhar from 1982 to 1996
- Gad Avigad (born 1930), Israeli biochemist
- Gad Avrahami (born 1952), Israeli composer
- Gad Barzilai (born 1958), Israeli professor of law, political science and international studies
- Gad Frederik Clement (1867–1933), Danish painter generally known as G. F. Clement
- Gad Elbaz (born 1982), Israeli singer
- Gad Elmaleh (born 1971), Moroccan-French comedian and actor
- Gad Granach (1915–2011), German writer
- Gad Horowitz (born 1936), Canadian political scientist and professor
- Gad Landau (born 1954), Israeli computer scientist
- Gad Lerner (born 1954), Italian journalist and writer
- Gad Machnes (footballer) (born 1956), Israeli retired footballer and manager
- Gad Machnes (politician) (1893-1954), Israeli orientalist and government official
- Gad Navon (1922–2006), third Chief Military Rabbi of the Israel Defense Forces
- Gad Rausing (1922–2000), Swedish industrialist and archaeologist
- Gad Saad (born 1964), Lebanese-born Canadian evolutionary behavioral scientist
- Gad Shimron (born 1950), Israeli journalist, author and military affairs commentator
- Gad Tsobari (born 1944), Israeli freestyle wrestler and survivor of the 1972 Munich massacre
- Gad Yaacobi (1935-2007), Israeli politician
- Gad Zeevi (born 1939), Israeli industrialist

== Surname ==
- Cille Gad (1675-1711), Norwegian poet
- Dodo Gad, lead singer of the Danish pop band Dodo and the Dodos
- Dora Gad (1912-2003), Israeli interior designer
- Emma Gad (1852-1921), Danish writer and socialite, mother of Urban Gad
- Hubert Gad (1914-1939), Polish footballer
- Hyakinthos Gad (1912–1975), Apostolic exarch of the Greek Byzantine Catholic Church from 1958 to 1975
- Jens Gad (born 1966), German producer, songwriter and guitarist, brother of Toby Gad
- Johannes Gad (1842–1926), German neurophysiologist
- Josh Gad (born 1981), American actor, comedian and singer
- Pablo Gad (fl. 1977 to present), British Roots reggae singer and songwriter
- Toby Gad (born 1968), Los Angeles-based German music producer/songwriter, brother of Jens Gad
- Urban Gad (1879–1947), Danish film director, son of Emma Gad

== Nickname ==
- Gerhard Gad Beck (1923–2012), German Jewish educator, author, activist and survivor of the Holocaust
