= Tayammum =

Islamic ablution when clean water is unavailable

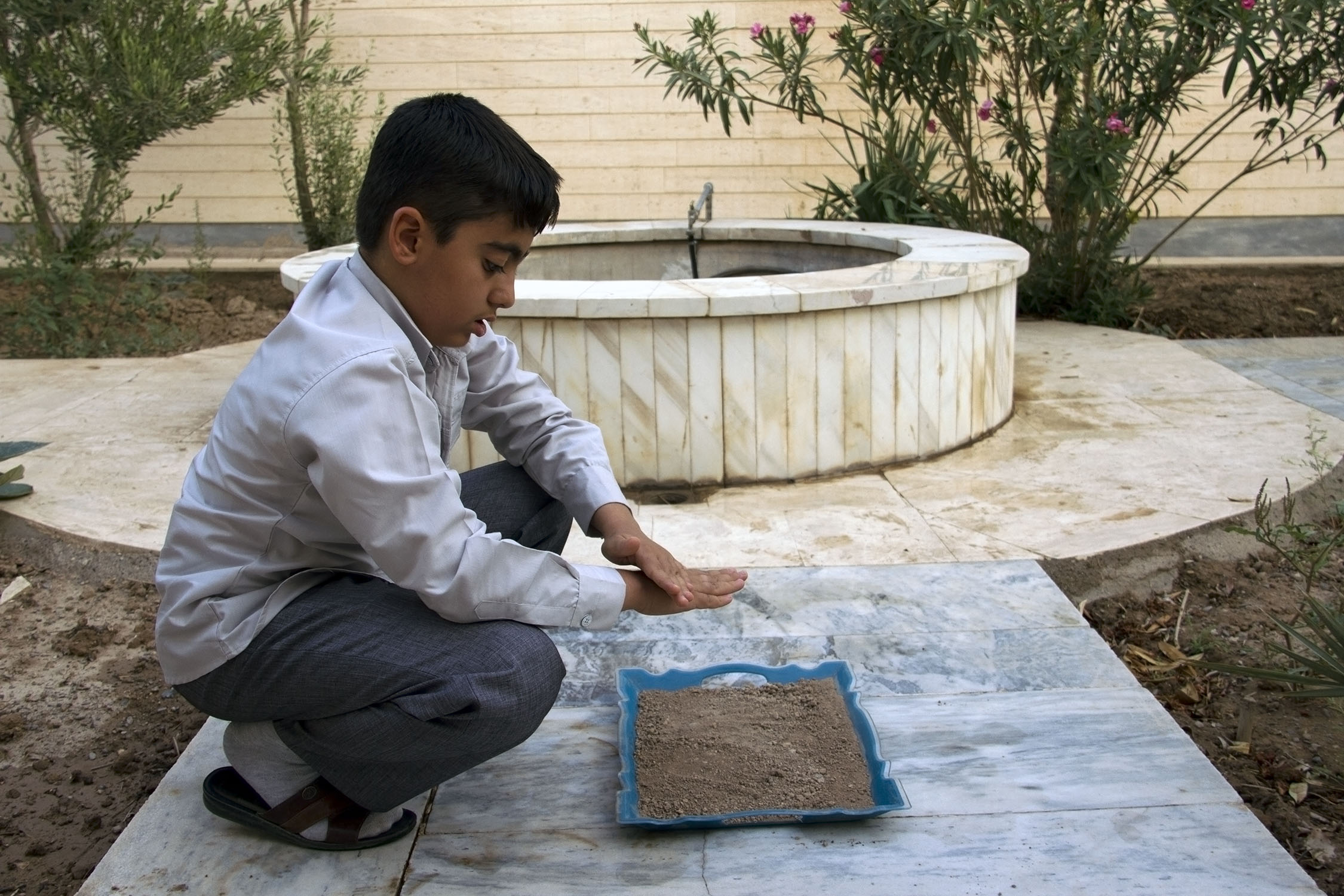
A child performing tayammum

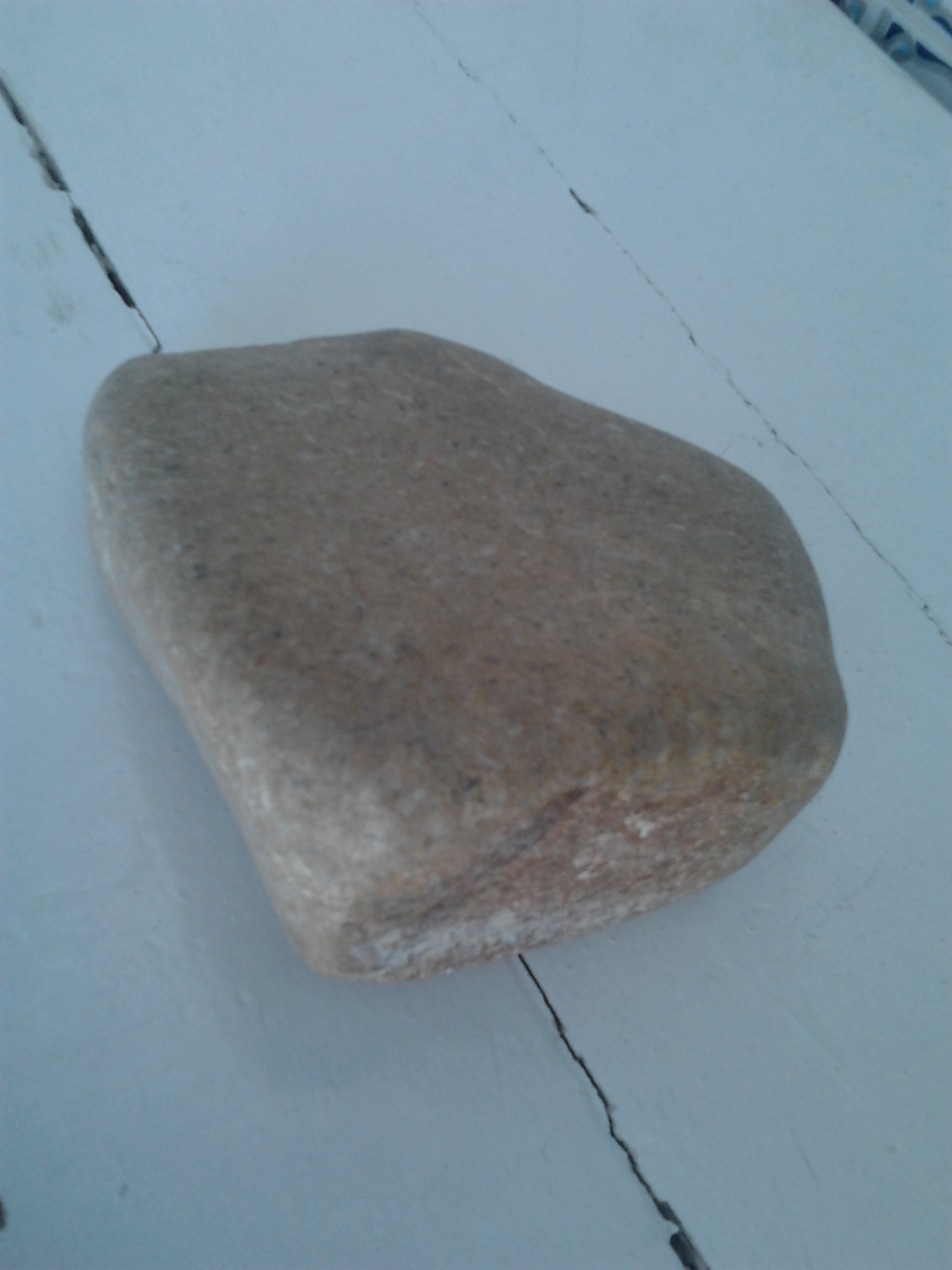
Stone of Tayammum

Tayammum (Arabic: تيمم) is the Islamic act of dry ritual purification using purified (clean) sand, stone or earth, which may be performed in place of ritual washing (wudu or ghusl) if no clean water is readily available or if one is suffering from moisture-induced skin inflammation or scaling, illness, or hardship.

== Etymology ==
Tayammum (Arabic: تيمم [tæˈjæm.mʊm]) is an Arabic word that means an aim or purpose. Tayammum is derived from "amma," meaning 'to repair.'

In Islamic law, Tayammum means to wipe the face and hands of a person with the purpose of purification for prayer by using soil, purified sand, or dust.

=== In the Quran ===
Oh you who believe! When you intend to offer As-Salat (the prayer), wash your faces and your hands (forearms) up to the elbows, rub (by passing wet hands over) your heads, and (wash) your feet up to ankles. If you are in a state of Janaba (i.e. after a sexual discharge), purify yourselves (bathe your whole body). But if you are ill or on a journey, or any of you comes after answering the call of nature, or you have been in contact with women (i.e. sexual intercourse), and you find no water, then perform tayammum with clean earth and rub therewith your faces and hands. Allah does not want to place you in difficulty, but He wants to purify you, and to complete His Favor to you that you may be thankful. (Note: Qur'an, 5:6)

== Circumstances ==
In the following eight circumstances, one has to make Tayammum rather than Wudu (ablution) or ghusl (a ritual bath):

- When access to water is restricted or impractical.
- When one's responsibility is to use the limited supply of water to remove impurity from a Mosque.
- When sufficient amounts of water for ritual washing are not available.
- When using the available water for wudu or ghusl will leave insufficient water for drinking and will put you and your dependents at risk of dying of thirst or illness.
- When obtaining water is hazardous or prohibitively expensive.
- When using water poses a health risk that does not come under the subject of wiping (masah) over a jabirah (splint), especially when there is a risk of worsening the injury if the dressing is removed.
- When the water available is impure.
- When performing Wudu or Ghusl will take all or part of the time of prayer (according to the Maliki school).

=== In the Quran ===
O you who have believed, do not approach prayer while you are intoxicated until you know what you are saying or in a state of janabah, except those passing through [a place of prayer], until you have washed [your whole body]. And if you are ill or on a journey or one of you comes from the place of relieving himself or you have contacted women and find no water, then seek clean earth and wipe over your faces and your hands [with it]. Indeed, Allah is ever Pardoning and Forgiving. (Note: Qur'an, 4:43)

Thus, in case of illness, even if there is water, one still does not need to wash.

The verse of tayammum was revealed while Muhammad was on an expedition with the Muslim army and accompanied alongside his wife Aisha. Aisha had borrowed a necklace from Asma, her sister, and had noticed that her necklace was missing. She informed Muhammad about this and he stopped the entire army so that they could look for it. Eventually one of the men found the necklace, however, it was time to pray and no water was to be found for them to perform the wudu (ablution). It was at this point that the verse of Tayammum was revealed.

== Performance ==
Tayammum (التيمم) is practiced as follows:

1. Finding a piece of ground which is free of najaasah (unclean elements). This may be any kind of ground surface that naturally collects dust like rock or sand
2. Intending tayammum
3. Reciting the bismillah
4. Placing one's hands on the surface of the ground. If using a small stone the Hanafi and Maliki madhabs also permit turning it over
5. Dusting off the hands
6. Rubbing the hands with one another
7. Rubbing the face with both hands

There is a difference of opinion as to how much of the hands should be wiped. The Hanafis, Shafi'is and a secondary opinion in the Maliki madhab says that wiping the hands till and including the elbows is fardh. The second opinion is held by the majority of the Malikis and some Hanbalis. They say that wiping the hands till the wrists is fardh and wiping them till and including the elbows is sunnah. The third opinion is held by the majority of the Hanbalis. The Hanbalis say that in tayyammum, there is only wiping the hands till the wrists and that wiping the hands till the elbows is not even a part of tayammum. However there is ijma (i.e, consensus) among the four schools that wiping the whole face is fardh.

The same conditions that invalidate wudu also invalidate tayammum. In addition, a person's tayammum is invalidated as and when water becomes available. Scholars differ regarding whether the hands or face should be wiped first. However those who maintain that order is not fardh (Hanafis and Malikis) say that you can wipe the hands first and then the face or you can wipe the face first then the hands. But they say that the order that is in the Qu'ran (wiping face and then hands) is better to follow. Those who maintain that order is fardh (Shafi'is and Hanbalis) say that if tayyammum is being done in place of wudu then order is fardh (wiping face then hands) as well as continuity. But if it is done in place of ghusl, then neither order or continuity are fardh.

Tayammum is permitted on clean earth piece, but the ideas about what is inside of this definition or not is depending per maddhabs. Some maddhabs accepts baked earthen pots (unglazed), clay, limestone, the tayammum stone, taahir (pure) earth, and walls of mud, stone or brick. Tayammum is not permitted on things that are not earthen, such as things that burn and turn into ashes or things that can be melted by heat.

Anything that nullifies wudu, such as urine, passing wind, stool, blood or pus that flows from its wound, vomiting a mouthfull, falling asleep whilst leaning against something, and fainting, will also nullify tayammum, since it is a substitute for wudu. Also, upon the presence of water, tayammum will be annulled, since tayammum is a process used at the absence of presence. Once the conditions are gone, one becomes impure and must redo the purification process through wudu.
