= Zimri D. Thomas =

American politician

Member of the Michigan House of Representatives from the Hillsdale County 1st district
- In office January 4, 1865 – December 31, 1866
- Preceded by: Charles Mosher
- Succeeded by: Stephen Canniff

Personal details
- Born: Zimri Dinsmore Thomas; September 16, 1809 Rowe, Massachusetts, U.S.
- Party: Republican

Zimri Dinsmore Thomas (born September 16, 1809) was an American politician who served in the Michigan House of Representatives representing the 1st district of Hillsdale County from 1865 to 1866.

== Early life ==
Thomas was born in Rowe, Massachusetts on September 16, 1809. In 1820, Thomas moved to central New York.

== Career ==
Thomas served as postmaster in Hamburg, New York for six years. In 1835, he moved to Michigan. From 1857 to 1858, Thomas served as supervisor of Allen Township, Michigan.

On November 8, 1864, he was elected to the Michigan House of Representatives, representing the 1st district of Hillsdale County from January 4, 1865, to December 31, 1866.

In 1866, Thomas served as justice of the peace for Hillsdale Township, Michigan alongside George W. Burchard, filling the vacancy left by Justice Henry T. Kellogg. In 1873, he served as a justice of the peace in the city of Hillsdale with C. B. Dresser, and in 1877 he again held the same office in the city of Hillsdale.

Thomas also served as a Hillsdale County coroner from 1873 to at least 1881.
