= Hobab =

Hobab may refer to:

- Hobab (biblical figure), Moses' father-in-law and the son of his father-in-law
- Hobab (album), by Mohsen Yeganeh, 2012
