= Gad Avrahami =

Israeli composer

Gad Avrahami (Hebrew: גד אברהמי; born 1952 in Kibbutz Shamir) is a composer active in Israel and elsewhere.

== Biographical information ==
Studied under the Professor of Composition and Music Theory Leon Schidlowsky (active also in graphic multi-media and the fine arts) at the Buchmann-Mehta School of Music (previously: Rubin Academy) in Tel Aviv University.

Compositions written by Avrahami have received radio broadcasts in Israel, the Netherlands, Germany, Scotland, Turkey and Hong Kong. He has stated that his greatest musical influences are Alban Berg, who studied with Arnold Schoenberg (associated with German Expressionism) for six years, and Olivier Messiaen (a person who stated his experiences of synaesthesia influenced his composing activities). In 1997 and also 2005 he received the Israeli Prime Minister award. The award ceremony took place at the Israel Music Conservatory, Tel Aviv, on June 30, 2005.
