= Masah =

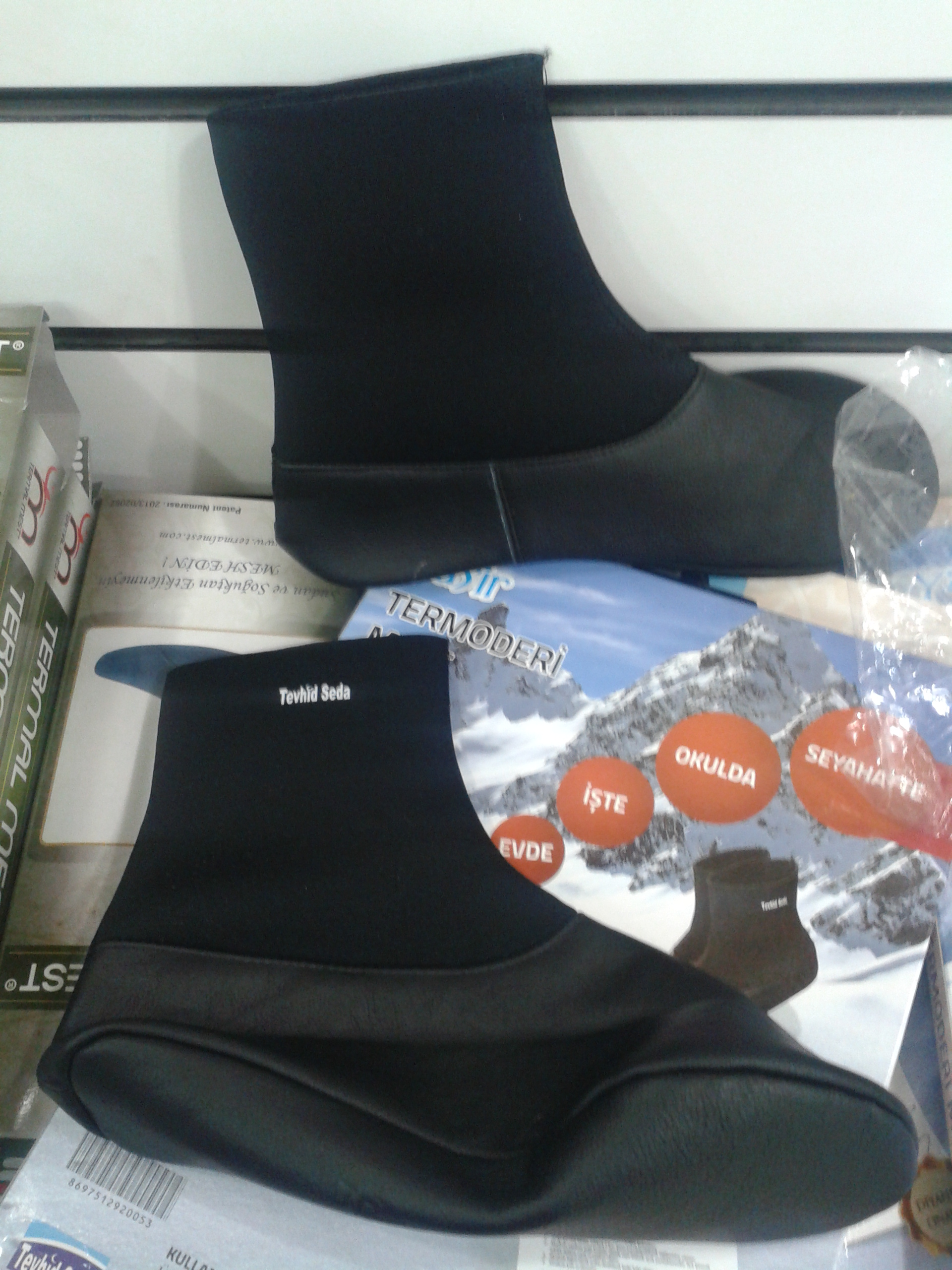
Khuffs

Masah (Arabic: مسح) refers to the act of ritually cleaning the head or feet with a small amount of water, running the wet hands over the head or feet before salat (Islamic prayer). The term shares the same root as the word Maseeh (Messiah) which is used for one who is anointed, in religious terms by God.

== Masah of the head ==
Wet hands should be passed all over the head with a deliberate stroke downwards from the top of the head, then index fingers are placed in the ear canal while thumbs pass behind ears and lobes, and finally swipe the back of the hands over the nape of the neck. This is done in one continuous motion without refreshing the hands with water for each component. Hands should not be passed around the fore-neck as it is prohibited. One may not make masah over a Muslim head cap and wet hands must actually touch the head.
