= Mona Abul-Fadl =

Egyptian women's studies scholar

- Born: 1945; Cairo, Egypt
- Died: September 23, 2008 (aged 62–63)
- Education: School of Oriental and African Studies
- Employer: International Institute of Islamic Thought
- Organization(s): Association for Women and Civilization Studies
- Mother: Zahira Abdin

Mona Abul-Fadl (1945-2008) was a scholar of contemporary Western thought and women's studies. She was associated with the International Institute of Islamic Thought (IIIT) and later with what is now known as Cordoba University. Her research interests included political theory, comparative politics, Islam and the Middle East, epistemology, and feminist scholarship.

== Life ==
Abul Fadl was born in Cairo in 1945, the daughter of physicians, philanthropists and activists, Zahira Abdin and Mun‘im Abul Fadl. She spent most of her childhood between London and Egypt. She gained her doctorate from the School of Oriental and African Studies at the University of London and went on to become a full professor at Cairo University. She was a Fulbright scholar at the Old Dominion University in Norfolk, Virginia, and an exchange scholar at the Center for Research and Study of Mediterranean Societies (CRESM) in Aix-en-Provence, France before joining the International Institute of Islamic Thought (IIIT).

The IIIT's founder, Isma‘il Raji al-Faruqi, and his wife, Lois Lamya’ al-Faruqi, recognized the value of Abul Fadl’s scholarship in bridging Islamic and Western intellectual epistemologies. They proceeded to recruit Abul Fadl to become an IIIT fellow, though their efforts did not materialize until after their 1986 assassination.

Abul Fadl’s IIIT research culminated in a manuscript that has yet to be published, Where East Meets West: Reviewing an Agenda, and Contrasting Epistemics. It was also through her academic affiliation with IIIT that she met her husband, Taha Jaber Al-Alwani, a scholar of Islamic jurisprudence and former president of the Fiqh Council of North America.

In 1999 she founded the Association for Women and Civilization Studies (ASWIC), a Cairo non-profit organization. ASWIC aimed to raise awareness about the position, role, and status of Muslim women throughout history by conducting historical research, promoting academic scholarship, and organizing seminars and training programs.

Mona Abul-Fadl died on September 23, 2008, after more than 2 years of battling breast cancer.

== Papers and theses ==
- Paradigms in Political Science Revisited : Critical Options and Muslim Perspectives
- The Enlightment Revisited : a Review Eassy
- Contemporary Social Theory-Tawhidi Projections-part1
- Contemporary Social Theory-Tawhidi Projections-part2
- Foundation of Islam : the Islamic View of Man
- Rethinking Culture, Rethinking the Academy : Tawhidi Perspective
- Revisiting the Women Question : an Islamic Perspective
- Beyond Culture Parodies and Parodizing Cultures : Shaping A Discourse
- Community, Justice and Gihad : Elements of the Muslim Historical Consciousness
- Squaring the Circle in the Study of the Middle East: Islamic Liberalism Reconsidered
