= Fatwa =

Nonbinding legal opinion in Islamic law

A fatwa (UK: /ˈfætwɑː/; US: /ˈfɑːtwɑː/; Arabic: فتوى, romanized: fatwā; pl. فتاوى, fatāwā) is a legal ruling on a point of Islamic law (sharia) given by a qualified Islamic jurist (faqih) in response to a question posed by a private individual, judge or government. A jurist issuing fatwas is called a mufti, and the act of issuing fatwas is called ifta. Fatwas have played an important role throughout Islamic history, taking on new forms in the modern era.

Resembling jus respondendi in Roman law and rabbinic responsa, privately issued fatwas historically served to inform Muslim populations about Islam, advise courts on difficult points of Islamic law, and elaborate substantive law. In later times, public and political fatwas were issued to take a stand on doctrinal controversies, legitimize government policies or articulate grievances of the population. During the era of European colonialism, fatwas played a part in mobilizing resistance against foreign aggressors.

Muftis acted as independent scholars in the classical legal system. Over the centuries, Sunni muftis were gradually incorporated into state bureaucracies, while Shia jurists in Iran asserted an autonomous authority starting from the early modern era.

In the modern era, fatwas have reflected changing economic, social and political circumstances, and addressed concerns arising in varied Muslim communities. The spread of codified state laws and Western-style legal education in the modern Muslim world has displaced muftis from their traditional role of clarifying and elaborating the laws applied in courts. Instead, modern fatwas have increasingly served to advise the general public on other aspects of sharia, particularly questions regarding religious rituals and everyday life. Modern public fatwas have addressed and sometimes sparked controversies in the Muslim world, and some fatwas in recent decades have gained worldwide notoriety. The legal methodology of modern ifta often diverges from pre-modern practice, particularly so in the West. Emergence of modern media and universal education has transformed the traditional institution of ifta in various ways. While the proliferation of contemporary fatwas attests to the importance of Islamic authenticity to many Muslims, little research has been done to determine how much these fatwas affect the beliefs or behavior of the Muslim public.

== Terminology ==
The word fatwa comes from the Arabic root f-t-w, whose meanings include 'youth, newness, clarification, explanation'. A number of terms related to fatwa derive from the same root. A jurist issuing fatwas is called a mufti. The person who asks for a fatwa is known as mustafti. The act of issuing fatwas is called iftāʾ. The term futyā refers to soliciting and issuing fatwas.

In older English language works the spelling fetva, from Turkish, is used, relating to the Ottoman Empire.

== Origins ==
The origins of the fatwa can be traced back to the Quran. On a number of occasions, the Quranic text instructs the Islamic prophet Muhammad how to respond to questions from his followers regarding religious and social practices. Several of these verses begin with the phrase "When they ask you concerning ..., say ..." In two cases (4:127, 4:176) this is expressed with verbal forms of the root f-t-y, which signify asking for or giving an authoritative answer. In the hadith literature, this three-way relationship between God, Muhammad, and believers, is typically replaced by a two-way consultation, in which Muhammad replies directly to queries from his Companions (sahaba).

According to Islamic doctrine, with Muhammad's death in 632, God ceased to communicate with mankind through revelation and prophets. At that point, the rapidly expanding Muslim community turned to Muhammad's Companions, as the most authoritative voices among them, for religious guidance, and some of them are reported to have issued pronouncements on a wide range of subjects. The generation of Companions was in turn replaced in that role by the generation of Successors (tabi'un). The concept of fatwa thus developed in Islamic communities under a question-and-answer format for communicating religious knowledge, and took on its definitive form with development of the classical theory of Islamic law.

== In pre-modern Islam ==
=== Process of iftāʾ ===
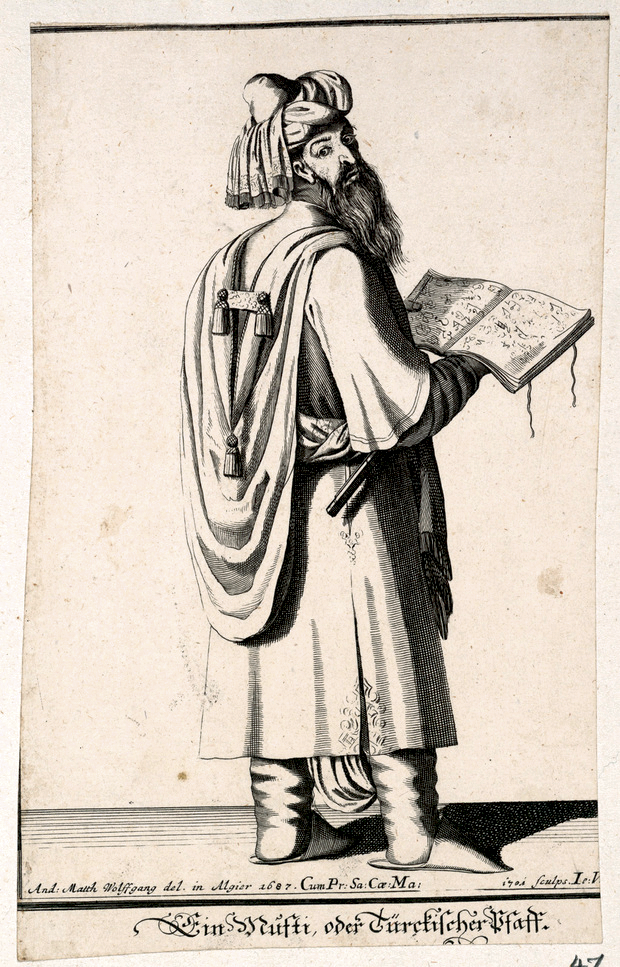
Turkish mufti (1687 engraving)

The legal theory of the fatwa was formulated in the classical texts of usul al-fiqh (principles of jurisprudence), while more practical guidelines for muftis were found in manuals called adab al-mufti or adab al-fatwa (etiquette of the mufti/fatwa).

Fatwas are issued in response to a query. They can range from a simple yes/no answer to a book-length treatise. A short fatwa may state a well-known point of law in response to a question from a lay person, while a "major" fatwa may give a judgment on an unprecedented case, detailing the legal reasoning behind the decision. Queries to muftis were supposed to address real and not hypothetical situations and be formulated in general terms, leaving out names of places and people. Since a mufti was not supposed to inquire into the situation beyond the information included in the query, queries regarding contentious matters were often carefully constructed to elicit the desired response. A mufti's understanding of the query commonly depended on their familiarity with local customs and colloquialisms. In theory, if the query was unclear or not sufficiently detailed for a ruling, the mufti was supposed to state these caveats in their response.

Fatwas were solicited by men and women from all social classes. A mufti could be an obscure scholar, who occasionally replied to queries from people in his neighborhood, or, at the other extreme, a famous jurist or a powerful state official. The level of technical detail supplied in a fatwa, such as citations of sources or specification of legal methodologies employed, depended on the technical level of the petitioner. In theory, a petitioner was supposed to verify the mufti's scholarly reputation, but mufti manuals (adab al-mufti) recognized that it would be difficult for a lay person to do so, and advised the petitioner to trust their sense of the mufti's piety and ideally follow the advice of a single scholar known for exemplary morals. The mufti was often a well-known figure in his neighborhood. Some petitioners could choose among several local muftis, while others had to or chose to travel to receive a fatwa. Judges commonly sent letters to solicit fatwas from prominent jurists in another town or even country. Sunni legal theory generally permits the petitioner to obtain a fatwa from multiple jurists on the same query, provided that it addresses a real and not hypothetical situation. Some petitioners sought out a second fatwa because they were unsatisfied with the first, and the two sides in a legal dispute generally each sought to obtain a fatwa that would support their position. Muftis often consulted another mufti on difficult cases, though this practice was not foreseen by legal theory, which saw futya as a transaction between one qualified jurist and one "unqualified" petitioner.

In theory, a mufti was expected to issue fatwas free of charge. In practice, muftis commonly received support from the public treasury, public endowments or private donations. Taking of bribes was forbidden. Until the 11th or 12th century, the vast majority of jurists held other jobs to support themselves. These were generally lower- and middle-class professions such as tanning, manuscript copying or small trade.

In theory, fatwas could be delivered orally or in writing, but it is not clear how common oral fatwas were, aside from those issued by an Ottoman office established specifically for the purpose of issuing oral fatwas. Many routine, written fatwas were delivered directly to the petitioner on the piece of paper containing the query, leaving no documentary trace. However, large collections of ordinary fatwas are preserved in Ottoman and Indian archives. Mufti manuals contained a number of regulations about the standard format of a fatwa, such as avoiding blank space that could be used for a spurious addition and concluding the fatwa with an expression like allahu a'lam (God knows best). Nonetheless, fatwas took on a variety of forms depending on the local legal culture.

The 14th century jurist Taqi al-Din Ibn Taymiyya was known for his methodology of issuing fatwas through direct research of the Qur'an and Hadith, rather than being restrained by the mechanism of the madhhabs (legal schools). Explaining Ibn Taymiyya's approach to issue fatwas, his student Al-Dhahabi writes:

"He was well informed of the legal views of the [Prophet's] companions and their followers, and he rarely talked about a subject without quoting the four schools of the imams. Yet, he contradicted the four schools in well-known matters about which he wrote and for which provided arguments from the Koran and the Sunna. He has compiled a work entitled Politics According to Divine Law for Establishing Order for Sovereign and Subjects and a book [called] Removing the Reproach from the Learned Imams.... For some years now he has not issued fatwas (legal opinions) according to a specific school, rather he bases these on the proof he has ascertained himself. He supported the pure Sunna and the way of Salafiyah".

=== Role of fatwas ===
The classical institution of fatwa is similar to jus respondendi in Roman law and the responsa in Jewish law.

Fatwas have played three important roles in the classical legal system:

- managing information about Islam by providing legal advice to Muslim populations as well as counseling them in matters of ritual and ethics;
- advising courts of law on finer points of Islamic law, in response to queries from judges;
- elaborating substantive Islamic law, particularly though a genre of legal literature developed by author-jurists who collected fatwas of prominent muftis and integrated them into books.

Before the rise of modern education, the study of law was a centerpiece of advanced education in the Islamic world. A relatively small class of legal scholars controlled the interpretation of sharia on a wide range of questions essential to the society, ranging from ritual to finance. It was considered a requirement for qualified jurists to communicate their knowledge through teaching or issuing fatwas. The ideal mufti was conceived as an individual of scholarly accomplishments and exemplary morals, and muftis were generally approached with the respect and deference corresponding to these expectations.

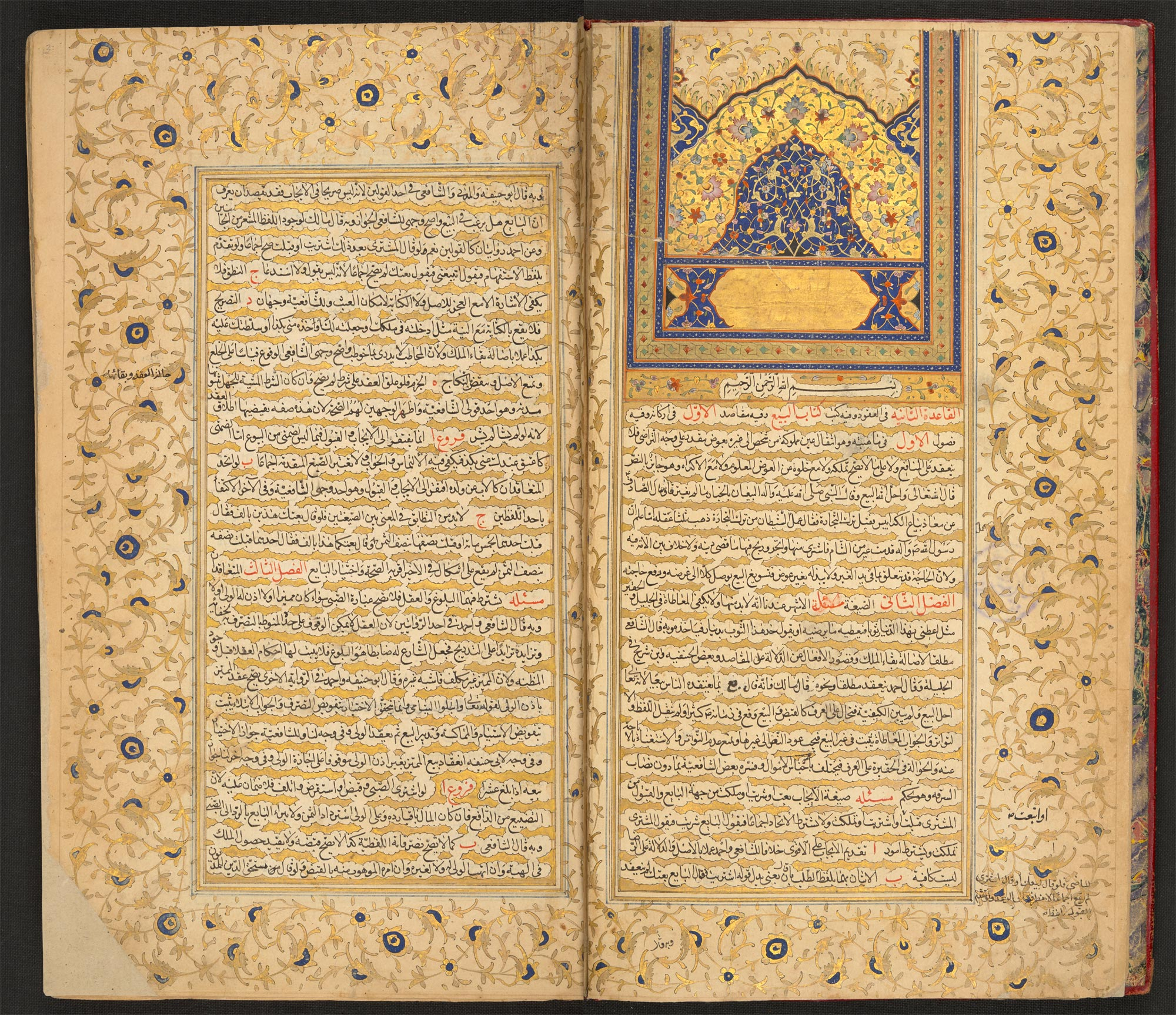
Page from a compilation of fatwas from Safavid Persia, late 17th century

Judges generally sought an opinion from a mufti with higher scholarly authority than themselves for difficult cases or potentially controversial verdicts. Fatwas were routinely upheld in courts, and if a fatwa was disregarded, it was usually because another fatwa supporting a different position was judged to be more convincing. If a party in a dispute was not able to obtain a fatwa supporting their position, they would be unlikely to pursue their case in court, opting for informal mediation instead, or abandoning their claim altogether. Sometimes muftis could be petitioned for a fatwa relating to a court judgment that has already been passed, acting as an informal appeals process, but the extent of this practice and its mechanism varied across history. While in most of the Islamic world judges were not required to consult muftis by any political authority, in Muslim Spain this practice was mandatory, so that a judicial decision was considered invalid without prior approval by a legal specialist.

Author-jurists collected fatwas by muftis of high scholarly reputation and abstracted them into concise formulations of legal norms that could be used by judges, giving a summary of jurisprudence for a particular madhhab (legal school). Author-jurists sought out fatwas that reflected the social conditions of their time and place, often opting for later legal opinions which were at variance with the doctrine of early authorities. Research by Wael Hallaq and Baber Johansen has shown that fatwa compilations could, and sometimes did, have a significant impact on the development of Islamic law.

During the early centuries of Islam, the roles of mufti, author-jurist and judge were not mutually exclusive. A jurist could lead a teaching circle, conduct a fatwa session, and adjudicate court cases in a single day, devoting his night hours to writing a legal treatise. Those who were able to act in all four capacities were regarded as the most accomplished jurists.

From the standpoint of morality and religious obligation, the term fatwa has been contrasted with taqwa (piety, fear of God), particularly in Sufi literature. Fatwas may allow a choice between lenient and strict interpretation of sharia on a certain matter, or they may employ legalistic stratagems (hiyal) to circumvent a stricter interpretation, while such strategies may not be acceptable from the standpoint of taqwa.

=== Qualifications of a mufti ===
The basic prerequisite for issuing fatwas under the classical legal theory was religious knowledge and piety. According to the adab al-mufti manuals, a mufti must be an adult, Muslim, trusted and reliable, of good character and sound mind, an alert and rigorous thinker, trained as a jurist, and not a sinner. On a practical level, the stature of muftis derived from their reputation for scholarly expertise and upright character.

According to legal theory, it was up to each mufti to decide when he was ready to practice. In practice, an aspiring jurist would normally study for several years with one or several recognized scholars, following a curriculum that included Arabic grammar, hadith, law and other religious sciences. The teacher would decide when the student was ready to issue fatwas by giving him a certificate (ijaza).

During the first centuries of Islam, it was assumed that a mufti was a mujtahid, i.e., a jurist who is capable of deriving legal rulings directly from the scriptural sources through independent reasoning (ijtihad), evaluating the reliability of hadith and applying or even developing the appropriate legal methodologies. Starting from around 1200 CE, legal theorists began to accept that muftis of their time may not possess the knowledge and legal skill to perform this activity. In addition, it was felt that the major question of jurisprudence had already been addressed by master jurists of earlier times, so that later muftis only had to follow the legal opinions established within their legal school (taqlid). At that point, the notions of mufti and mujtahid became distinguished, and legal theorists classified jurists into three or more levels of competence.

Among Twelver Shia, the Akhbari school of jurisprudence, which was predominant for a time during the early modern era, hold a different view on ifta from the currently predominant Usuli school. According to the Usulis, fatwas can be based on valid conjecture (zann) arrived through ijtihad, and every Muslim who is not qualified to be a mujtahid should become a follower (muqallid) of a mujtahid. In contrast, Akhbaris hold that all Shia Muslims must be muqallids of the Twelve Imams, and that fatwas should reflect only knowledge that is certain (qatʿ) and based on the traditions of the Imams.

Unlike the post of qadi, which is reserved for men in the classical sharia system, fatwas could be issued by qualified women as well as men. In practice, the vast majority of jurists who completed the lengthy curriculum in linguistic and religious sciences required to obtain the qualification to issue fatwas were men. Slaves and persons who were blind or mute were likewise theoretically barred from the post of a judge, but not that of mufti.

=== Fatwa vs. court judgement ===
The mufti and the judge play different roles in the classical sharia system, with corresponding differences between a fatwa and a qada (court decision):

- A fatwa is nonbinding (unless issued by a government judge in an Islamic state), while a court decision is binding and enforceable.
- A fatwa may deal with rituals, ethical questions, religious doctrines and sometimes even philosophical issues, while court cases dealt with legal matters in the narrow sense.
- The authority of a court judgment applies only to the specific court case, while a fatwa applies to all cases that fit the premises of the query.
- A fatwa is made on the basis of information provided in the request, while a judge actively investigates the facts of the case.
- A judge evaluates rival claims of two parties in a dispute in order to reach a verdict, while a fatwa is made on the basis of information provided by a single petitioner.
- Fatwas by prominent jurists were collected in books as sources of precedent, while court decisions were recorded in court registers, but not otherwise disseminated.
- While both muftis and judges were interpreters of sharia, judicial interpretation centered on evaluating evidence such as testimony and oath, while a mufti investigated textual sources of law (scripture and legal literature).
- In the classical legal system, judges were civil servants appointed by the ruler, while muftis were private scholars and not appointed officials.

=== Institutions ===
Before the 11th century CE, anyone who possessed scholarly recognition as an Islamic jurist could issue fatwas. Starting around that time, however, the public office of mufti began to appear alongside the private issuing of fatwas. In Khurasan, the rulers appointed a head of the local ulama, called shaykh al-Islam, who also functioned as the chief mufti. The Mamluks appointed four muftis, one for each of the four Sunni madhhabs, to appellate courts in provincial capitals. The Ottomans organized muftis into a hierarchical bureaucracy with a chief mufti of the empire called shaykh al-Islam at the top. The Ottoman shaykh al-Islam (Turk. şeyhülislam), was among the most powerful state officials. Scribes reviewed queries directed to Ottoman muftis and rewrote them to facilitate issuing of fatwas. In Mughal India and Safavid Iran the chief mufti had the title of sadr.

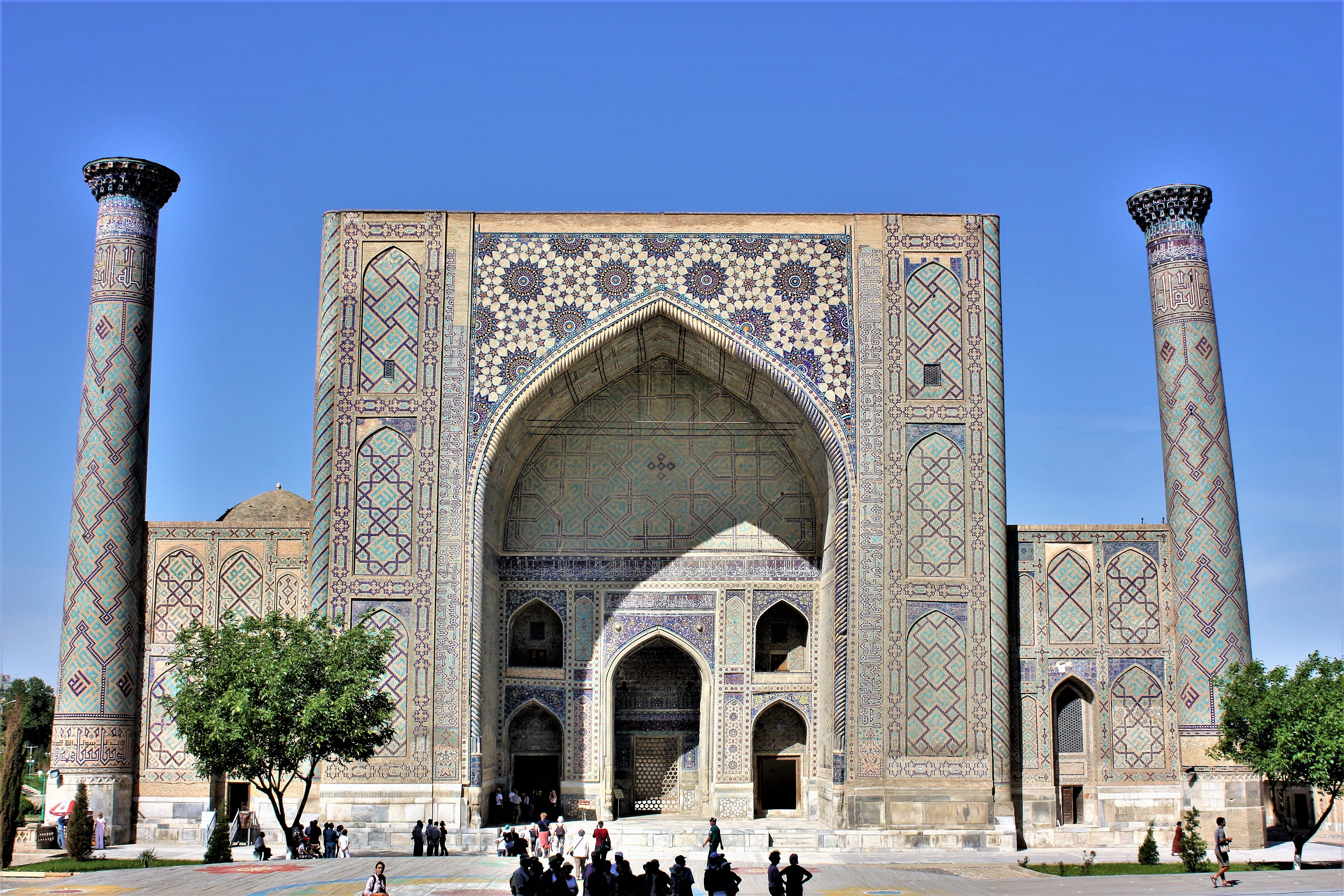
Ulugh Beg Madrasa, Samarkand (est. 1422)

For the first few centuries of Islam, muftis were educated in informal study circles, but beginning in the 11th and 12th centuries, the ruling elites began to establish institutions of higher religious learning known as madrasas in an effort to secure support and cooperation of the ulema (religious scholars). Madrasas, which were primarily devoted to the study of law, soon multiplied throughout the Islamic world, helping to spread Islamic learning beyond urban centers and to unite diverse Islamic communities in a shared cultural project.

In some states, such as Muslim Spain, muftis were assigned to courts in advisory roles. In Muslim Spain jurists also sat on a shura (council) advising the ruler. Muftis were additionally appointed to other public functions, such as market inspectors.

==== In Shia Islam ====
While the office of the mufti was gradually subsumed into the state bureaucracy in much of the Sunni Muslim world, Shia religious establishment followed a different path in Iran starting from the early modern era. During Safavid rule, independent Islamic jurists (mujtahids) claimed the authority to represent the hidden imam. Under the Usuli doctrine that prevailed among Twelver Shias in the 18th century and under the Qajar dynasty, the mujtahids further claimed to act collectively as deputies of the imam. According to this doctrine, every Muslim is supposed to choose and follow a high-ranking living mujtahid bearing the title of marja' al-taqlid, whose fatwas are considered binding, unlike fatwas in Sunni Islam. Thus, in contrast to Sunni muftis, Shia mujtahids gradually achieved increasing independence from the state.

=== Public and political fatwas ===
While most fatwas were delivered to an individual or a judge, some fatwas that were public or political in nature played an important role in religious legitimation, doctrinal disputes, political criticism, or political mobilization. As muftis were progressively incorporated into government bureaucracies in the course of Islamic history, they were often expected to support government policies. Ottoman sultans regularly sought fatwas from the chief mufti for administrative and military initiatives, including fatwas sanctioning jihad against Mamluk Egypt and Safavid Iran. Fatwas by the Ottoman chief mufti were also solicited by the rulers to lend religious legitimacy to new social and economic practices, such as financial and penal laws enacted outside of sharia, printing of nonreligious books (1727) and vaccination (1845).

At other times muftis wielded their influence independently of the ruler, and several sultans in Morocco and the Ottoman Empire were dethroned as a result of fatwas issued by influential jurists. This happened, for example, to the Ottoman sultan Murad V on the grounds of his insanity. Public fatwas were also used to dispute doctrinal matters, and in some case to proclaim that certain groups or individuals who professed to be Muslim were to be excluded from the Islamic community (a practice known as takfir). In both political and scholarly sphere, doctrinal controversies between different states, denominations or centers of learning were accompanied by dueling fatwas. Muftis also acted to counteract the influence of judges and secular functionaries. By articulating grievances and legal rights of the population, public fatwas often prompted an otherwise unresponsive court system to provide redress.

== In the modern era ==
=== Anti-colonial fatwas ===
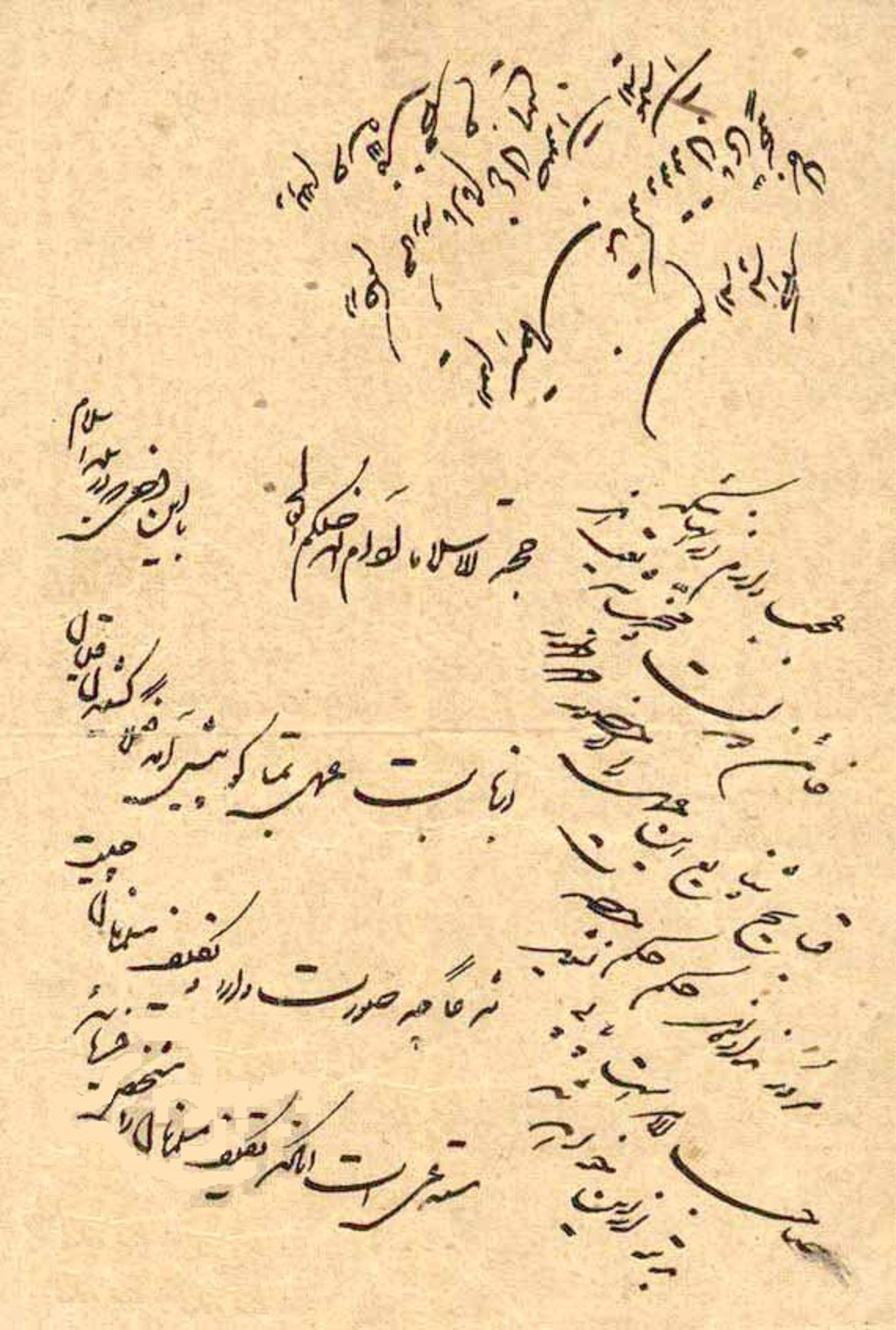
Tobacco protest fatwa issued by Mirza Shirazi

Early in the era of Western colonialism, several fatwas were issued drawing on the classical legal distinction between lands under Islamic rule (dar al-Islam) and lands of war (dar al-harb) or unbelief (dar al-kufr). These fatwas classified countries under European domination as lands of war or unbelief and invoked the legal theory obliging Muslims to wage war against the rulers of these lands or emigrate. A number of such fatwas were issued during the 19th century, including in 1803 by Shah Abdul Aziz in India and in 1804 by Usman dan Fodio in West Africa. The unrealistic nature of these fatwas was soon recognized and in 1870 the ulama of northern India issued fatwas stating that Indian Muslims were not obliged to rebel or emigrate. A similar doctrinal controversy occurred in French-ruled Algeria. The fatwas solicited by the Algerian anti-colonial leader Abd al-Qadir differed in their technical detail, while the French authorities obtained fatwas from local muftis, stating that Muslims living under the rule of unbelievers were not obligated to fight or emigrate as long as they were granted religious freedom by the authorities.

On many other occasions, fatwas served as an effective tool for influencing the political process. For example, in 1904 a fatwa by Moroccan ulema achieved the dismissal of European experts hired by the Moroccan government, while in 1907 another Moroccan fatwa succeeded in deposing the sultan on accusation that he failed to mount a defense against French aggression. The 1891 tobacco protest fatwa by the Iranian mujtahid Mirza Shirazi, which prohibited smoking as long as the British tobacco monopoly was in effect, also achieved its goals.

=== Modern institutions ===
Under European colonial rule, the institution of dar al-ifta was established in a number of madrasas (law colleges) as a centralized place for issuing of fatwas, and these organizations to a considerable extent replaced independent muftis as religious guides for the general population. Following independence, most Muslim states established national organizations devoted to issuing fatwas. One example is the Egyptian Dar al-Ifta, founded in 1895, which has served to articulate a national vision of Islam through fatwas issued in response to government and private queries. National governments in Muslim-majority countries also instituted councils of senior religious scholars to advise the government on religious matters and issue fatwas. These councils generally form part of the ministry for religious affairs, rather than the justice department, which may have a more assertive attitude toward the executive branch.

While chief muftis of earlier times oversaw a hierarchy of muftis and judges applying traditional jurisprudence, most modern states have adopted European-influenced legal codes and no longer employ traditional judicial procedures or traditionally trained judges. State muftis generally promote a vision of Islam that is compatible with state law of their country.

Although some early theorists argued that muftis should not respond to questions on certain subjects, such as theology, muftis have in practice handled queries relating to a wide range of subjects. This trend continued in modern times, and contemporary state-appointed muftis and institutions for ifta respond to government and private queries on varied issues, including political conflicts, Islamic finance, and medical ethics, contributing to shaping a national Islamic identity.

There exists no international Islamic authority to settle differences in interpretation of Islamic law. An International Islamic Fiqh Academy was created by the Organisation of Islamic Cooperation, but its legal opinions are not binding.

=== Legal methodology ===
Modern fatwas have been marked by an increased reliance on the process of ijtihad, i.e. deriving legal rulings based on an independent analysis rather than conformity with the opinions of earlier legal authorities (taqlid). While in the past muftis were associated with a particular school of law (madhhab), in the 20th century many muftis began to assert their independence from traditional schools of jurisprudence.

The most notorious result of disregarding classical jurisprudence are the fatwas of militant extremists who have interpreted the Quran and hadith as supporting suicide bombings, indiscriminate killing of bystanders, and declaration of self-professed Muslims as unbelievers (takfir).

New forms of ijtihad have also given rise to fatwas that support such notions as gender equality and banking interest, which are at variance with classical jurisprudence. This is commonly accomplished by application of various traditional legal doctrines such as the maqasid (objectives) of sharia, maslaha (public interest) and darura (necessity), in place of adhering to the letter of scriptural sources. The main argument for this approach is that Islamic law is meant to serve the interest of Muslims and make their lives easier (taysīr). This form of ijtihad is particularly prominent in fiqh al-aqallīyāt (minority jurisprudence), a recently developed branch of Islamic jurisprudence that aims to address the needs of Muslims living in countries with a non-Muslim majority. Its opponents object that sharia is supposed to determine the interests of Muslims, and not the other way around.

=== Political fatwas and controversies ===
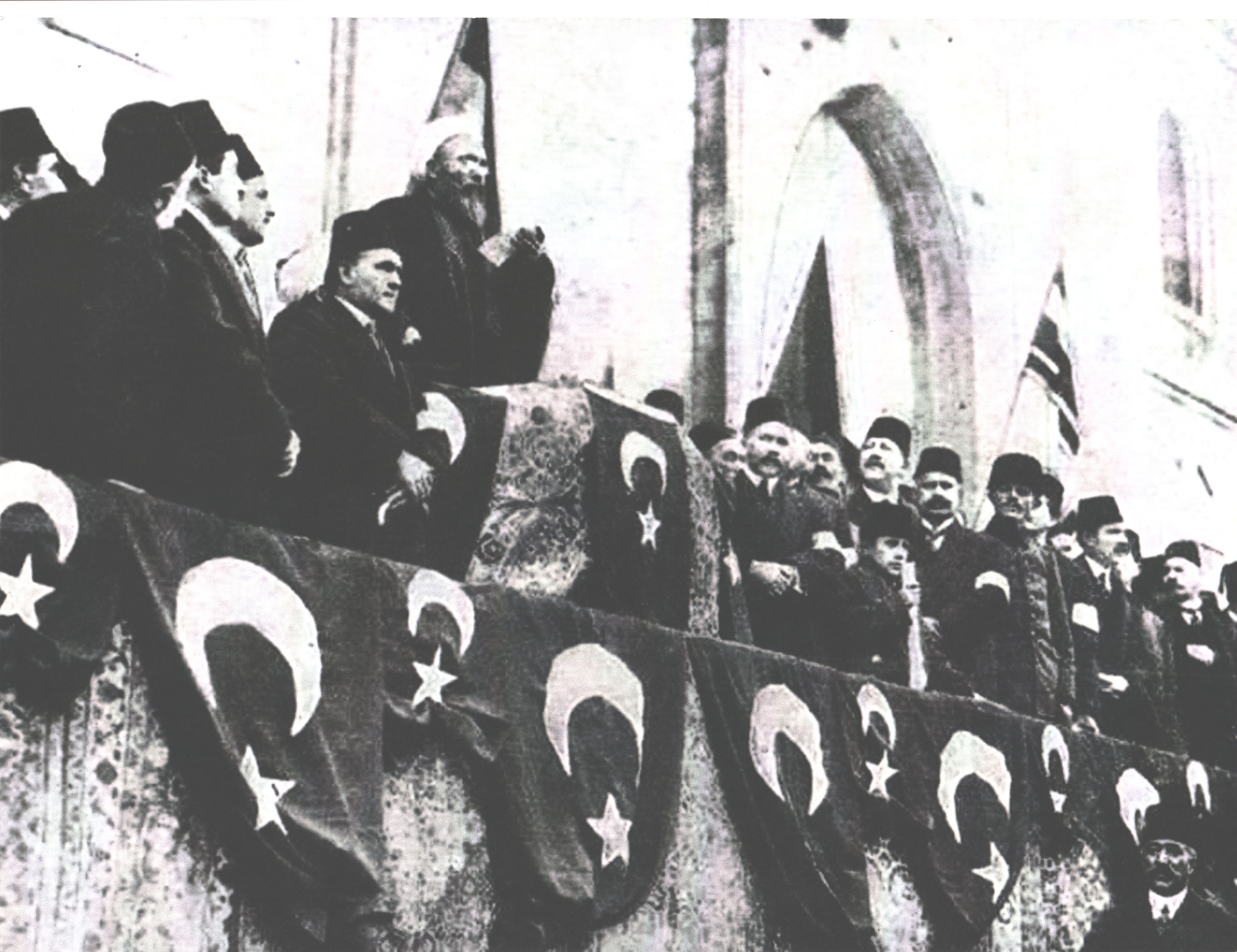
Fatwa supporting the Ottoman proclamation of jihad in 1914, read by the Custodian Of The Fatwa (Fetva Emini)

On November 14, 1914, the Ottoman sultan proclaimed a jihad to mark the official entry of the Ottoman Empire into World War I. The proclamation was supported by a fatwa issued by the Shaykh al-Islam. Contrary to the German hopes that the proclamation would trigger Muslim revolts in British and French colonies, it was either rejected or quietly ignored by their Muslim authorities. It also quickly gave rise to a heated academic debate in Europe. The controversy was sparked by a 1915 article by the prominent Dutch orientalist C. Snouck Hurgronje, titled Heilige Oorlog [Holy War] Made in Germany. In it Hurgronje denounced his German colleagues, who he felt instigated the jihad proclamation in an irresponsible appeal to an antiquated concept that threatened the project of modernizing the Muslim world. The article was widely circulated in an English translation and its accuracy continues to be debated by historians, who acknowledge both the German influence and the internal political calculations of the Ottoman government underlying the proclamation.

Several boycott fatwas were issued in modern times, such as the one issued by Iraqi ulema in 1933, calling on Muslims to boycott Zionist products. In 2004 Yusuf al-Qaradawi issued a fatwa calling for boycott of Israeli and American products, arguing that buying these goods would strengthen the "enemy" fighting against Muslims in the struggle over Palestine.

Some muftis in the modern era, like the mufti of the Lebanese republic in the mid-20th century and the Grand Mufti of the Sultanate of Oman, were important political leaders. In Iran, Ayatollah Khomeini used proclamations and fatwas to introduce and legitimize a number of institutions, including the Council of the Islamic Revolution and the Iranian Parliament.

Khomeini's most publicized fatwa was the proclamation condemning Salman Rushdie to death for his novel The Satanic Verses. Khomeini himself did not call this proclamation a fatwa, and some scholars have argued that it did not qualify as one, since in Islamic legal theory only a court can decide whether an accused is guilty. However, after the proclamation was presented as a fatwa in Western press, this characterization was widely accepted by both its critics and its supporters, and the Rushdie Affair is credited with bringing the institution of fatwa to world attention. Together with later militant fatwas, it has contributed to the popular misconception of the fatwa as a religious death warrant.

==== On violence ====
Many militant and reform movements in modern times have disseminated fatwas issued by individuals who do not possess the qualifications traditionally required of a mufti. A famous example is the fatwa issued in 1998 by Osama bin Laden and four of his associates, proclaiming "jihad against Jews and Crusaders" and calling for killing of American civilians. In addition to denouncing its content, many Islamic jurists stressed that bin Laden was not qualified to either issue a fatwa or declare a jihad.

The Amman Message was a statement, signed in 2005 in Jordan by nearly 200 prominent Islamic jurists, which served as a "counter-fatwa" against a widespread use of takfir (excommunication) by jihadist groups to justify jihad against rulers of Muslim-majority countries. The Amman Message recognized eight legitimate schools of Islamic law and prohibited declarations of apostasy against them. The statement also asserted that fatwas can be issued only by properly trained muftis, thereby seeking to delegitimize fatwas issued by militants who lack the requisite qualifications.

Erroneous and sometimes bizarre fatwas issued by unqualified or eccentric individuals in recent times have sometimes given rise to complaints about a "chaos" in the modern practice of ifta.

=== Fatwas in the West ===
In the aftermath of the September 11, 2001, attacks, a group of Middle Eastern Islamic scholars issued a fatwa permitting Muslims serving in the U.S. army to participate in military action against Muslim countries, in response to a query from a U.S. Army Muslim chaplain. This fatwa illustrated two increasingly widespread practices. First, it drew directly on the Quran and hadith without referencing the body of jurisprudence from any of the traditional schools of Islamic law. Secondly, questions from Western Muslims directed to muftis in Muslim-majority countries have become increasingly common, as about one-third of Muslims now live in Muslim-minority countries.

Institutions devoted specifically to issuing fatwas to Western Muslims have been established in the West, including the Fiqh Council of North America (FCNA, founded in 1986) and the European Council for Fatwa and Research (ECFR, founded in 1997). These organizations aim to provide fatwas that address the concerns of Muslim minorities, helping them to comply with sharia, while stressing compatibility of Islam with diverse modern contexts. The FCNA was founded with the goal of developing legal methodologies for adopting Islamic law to life in the West. The ECRF draws on all major schools of Sunni law as well as other traditional legal principles, such as concern for the public good, local custom, and the prevention of harm, to derive fatwas suitable for life in Europe. For example, a 2001 ECRF ruling allowed a woman who had converted to Islam to remain married without requiring her husband's conversion, based in part on the existence of European laws and customs under which women are guaranteed the freedom of religion. Rulings of this kind have been welcomed by some, but also criticized by others as being overly eclectic in legal methodology and having potential to negatively impact the interpretation of sharia in Muslim-majority countries.

The needs of Western Muslims have given rise to a new branch of Islamic jurisprudence which has been termed the jurisprudence of (Muslim) minorities (fiqh al-aqallīyāt). The term is believed to have been coined in a 1994 fatwa by Taha Jabir Alalwani, then the chairman of FCNA, which encouraged Muslim citizens to participate in American politics. This branch of jurisprudence has since been developed primarily, but not exclusively for Muslim minorities in the West.

=== Role of modern media ===
Advances in communication technology and the rise of the internet have changed the reception and role of fatwas in modern society. In the pre-modern era, most fatwas issued in response to private queries were read only by the petitioner. Early in the 20th century, the reformist Islamic scholar Rashid Rida responded to thousands of queries from around the Muslim world on a variety of social and political topics in the regular fatwa section of his Cairo-based journal Al-Manar. In the late 20th century, when the Grand Mufti of Egypt Sayyid Tantawy issued a fatwa allowing interest banking, the ruling was vigorously debated in the Egyptian press by both religious scholars and lay intellectuals.

In the internet age, a large number of websites has appeared offering fatwas to readers around the world. For example, IslamOnline publishes an archive of "live fatwa" sessions, whose number approached a thousand by 2007, along with biographies of the muftis. Together with satellite television programs, radio shows and fatwa hotlines offering call-in fatwas, these sites have contributed to the rise of new forms of contemporary ifta. Unlike the concise or technical pre-modern fatwas, fatwas delivered through modern mass media often seek to be more expansive and accessible to the wide public.

Modern media have also facilitated cooperative forms to ifta. Networks of muftis are commonly engaged by fatwa websites, so that queries are distributed among the muftis in the network, who still act as individual jurisconsults. In other cases, Islamic jurists of different nationalities, schools of law, and sometimes even denominations (Sunni and Shia), coordinate to issue a joint fatwa, which is expected to command greater authority with the public than individual fatwas. The collective fatwa (sometimes called ijtihād jamāʿī, "collective legal interpretation") is a new historical development, and it is found in such settings as boards of Islamic financial institutions and international fatwa councils.

=== Social role of fatwas ===
As the role of fatwas on strictly legal issues has declined in modern times, there has been a relative increase in the proportion of fatwas dealing with rituals and further expansion in purely religious areas like Quranic exegesis, creed, and Sufism. Modern fatwas also deal with a wide variety of other topics, including insurance, sex-change operations, moon exploration, beer drinking, abortion in the case of fatal foetal abnormalities, or males and females sharing workplaces. Public "fatwa wars" have reflected political controversies in the Muslim world, from anti-colonial struggles to the Gulf War of the 1990s, when muftis in some countries issued fatwas supporting collaboration with the US-led coalition, while muftis from other countries endorsed the Iraqi call for jihad against the US and its collaborators. In the private sphere, some muftis have begun to resemble social workers, giving advice on various personal issues encountered in everyday life.

The social profile of the fatwa petitioner has also undergone considerable changes. Owing to the rise of universal education, those who solicit fatwas have become increasingly educated, which has transformed the traditional mufti–mustafti relationship based on restricted literacy. The questioner is now also increasingly likely to be female, and in the modern world, Muslim women tend to address muftis directly rather than conveying their query through a male relative as in the past. Since women now represent a significant proportion of students studying Islamic law and qualifying as muftiyas, their prominence in its interpretation is likely to rise. A fatwa hotline in the United Arab Emirates provides access to either male or female muftis, allowing women to request fatwas from female Islamic legal scholars.

The vast amount of fatwas produced in the modern world attests to the importance of Islamic authenticity to many Muslims. However, there is little research available to indicate to what extent Muslims acknowledge the authority of various fatwas and heed their rulings in real life. Rather than reflecting the actual conduct or opinions of Muslims, these fatwas may instead represent a collection of opinions on what Muslims "ought to think".

== See also ==
- List of fatwas
- Madhhab – Islamic legal schools of law
- Nāzila
- Responsa – Body of written legal decisions and rulings
