= Jerry May =

Jerry May may refer to:

- Jerry May (baseball) (1943–1996), American baseball player
- Gerald May (1940–2005), known as Jerry, American psychiatrist
- Geri Maye, Irish television host

== See also ==
- Jerry Mays (disambiguation)
