= Shore Theater =

Former theater in Brooklyn, New York

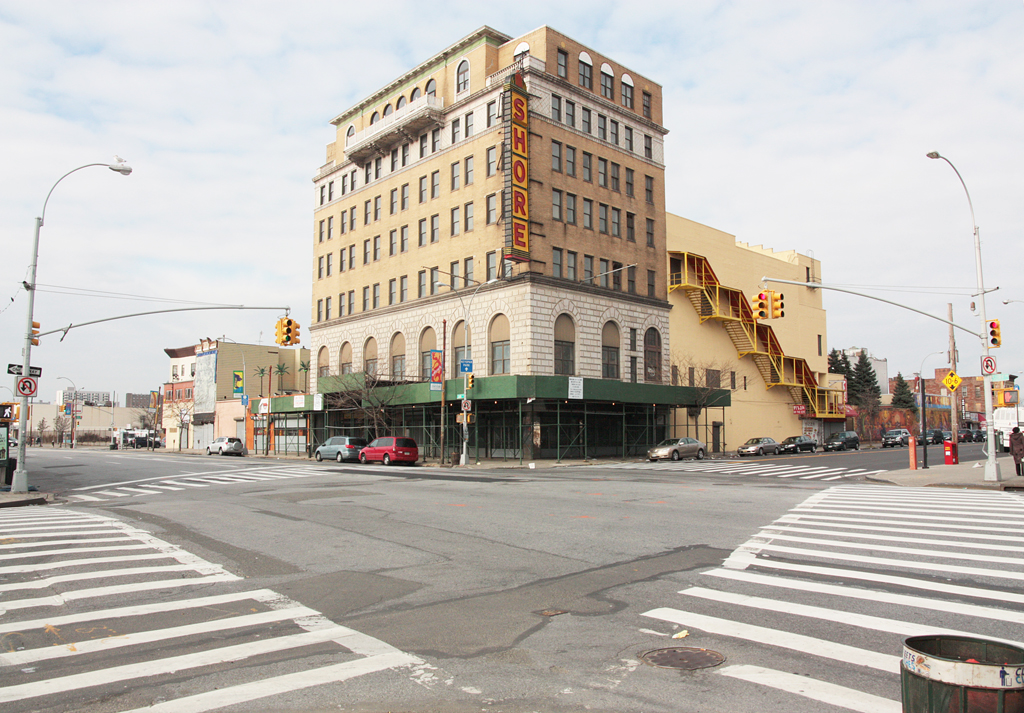
- Interactive map of Shore Theater
- Former names: Coney Island Theater
- Address: 1301 Surf Avenue
- Location: Brooklyn, New York 11224
- Coordinates: 40.5758°N 73.9816°W
- Owner: Pye Properties
- Type: Theater

Construction
- Opened: June 17, 1925
- Closed: 1978
- Cost: $2 million
- Architects: Paul C. Reilly and Douglas Pairman Hall

The Shore Theater (formerly known as the Coney Island Theater and alternately spelled Shore Theatre) is a former movie theater in the Coney Island neighborhood of Brooklyn in New York City. The seven-story neo-Renaissance Revival building, with office space as well as a theater, is located at the intersection of Surf and Stillwell Avenues, across from Nathan's Famous and the Coney Island–Stillwell Avenue station. Completed in 1925, it was one of several structures that was intended to boost the development of Coney Island as a year-round entertainment destination. After being abandoned in the 1970s, it stood unused for several years before being redeveloped into a hotel in the late 2010s. As of 2024, the building is still undergoing reconstruction.

== History ==
=== Context and construction ===
The first bridge to Coney Island was established in 1824, and this was followed five years later by the creation of the Coney Island House, a seaside resort. Coney Island soon developed as a resort destination in the mid-19th century, development of which was helped by the construction of railroads after the American Civil War. A series of fires in the resorts in the 1880s and 1890s opened up large tracts of land for the development of theme parks, of which several had been built by the first decade of the 20th century. Further redevelopment of Coney Island came with the opening of the New York City Subway to Stillwell Avenue in 1920 and the completion of the Riegelmann Boardwalk three years later. With this came the construction of structures such as Child's Restaurant on the Boardwalk, the Half Moon Hotel, Stauch's Baths, and various amusement rides and theaters, all during the Jazz Age in the 1920s.

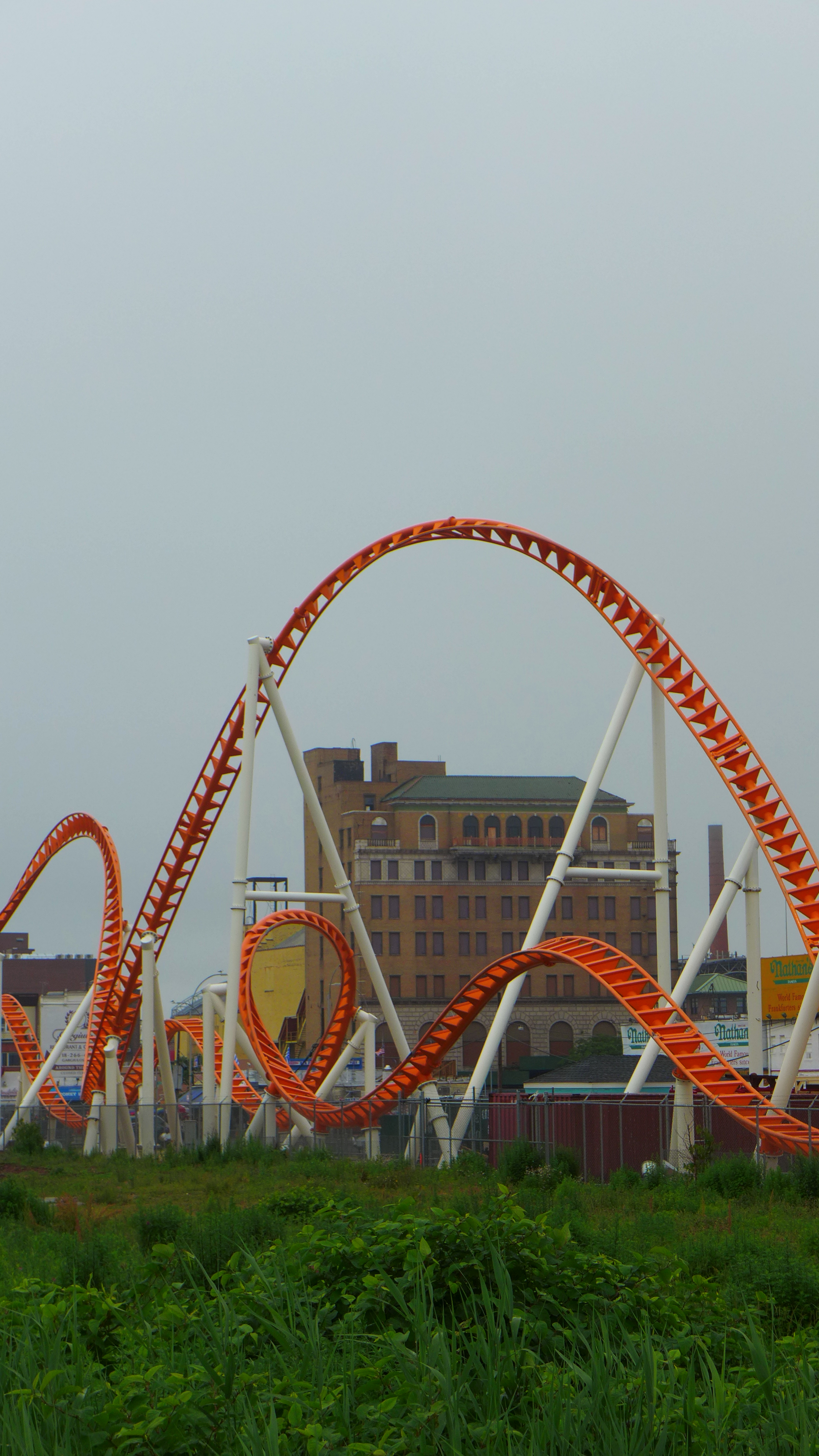
Seen from the Riegelmann Boardwalk behind the Thunderbolt roller coaster

The Coney Island Theater was built on the site of the Culver Depot, a former railroad terminal that was decommissioned after the new subway terminal had opened. One resident on the site refused to be evicted, resulting in a court case where he was eventually paid $5,000 to move away. The theater was constructed by the Chanin Construction Company, whose president Irwin Chanin said that he believed the theater would satiate "the great need in Coney Island for an all-year amusement". Theater designers Paul C. Reilly and Douglas Pairman Hall were hired to design the structure, construction for which began in May 1924. The Coney Island Theater distinguished itself from other area theaters in that it was constructed with brick, limestone, and terracotta as opposed to the wooden materials used in other Coney Island structures. In addition, it provided seven stories where other Coney Island buildings were only one or two stories. The theater also included offices intended for entertainment companies as well as shops on the Stillwell and Surf Avenue frontages. Construction was expected to cost $2 million in total. In April 1925, the Coney Island Theater was leased to Loew's Theatres.

=== Operation ===
On June 17, 1925, Loew's president Marcus Loew presided over the opening of the Coney Island Theater. The attendees on its opening day included Johnny Hines, Barbara La Marr, Mae Busch, Ben Lyon, Texas Guinan, Dorothy Mackaill, Virginia Lee Corbin, and John Lowe. Vaudeville was added as a weekly feature in 1941. For much of the next three decades, the Coney Island Theater presented vaudeville entertainment.

By 1964, the Coney Island Theater was transferred out of Loew's control, becoming the Brandt Shore Theater. The theater showed only movies for the next year. However, starting January 1966, it was also used for musicals, plays, and revues. Burlesque performances staged by Leroy Griffith were added in May 1966, and films alongside the live entertainment would start soon afterward. By the early 1970s, the live shows had ended and the theater displayed adult films.

=== Closure and redevelopment ===
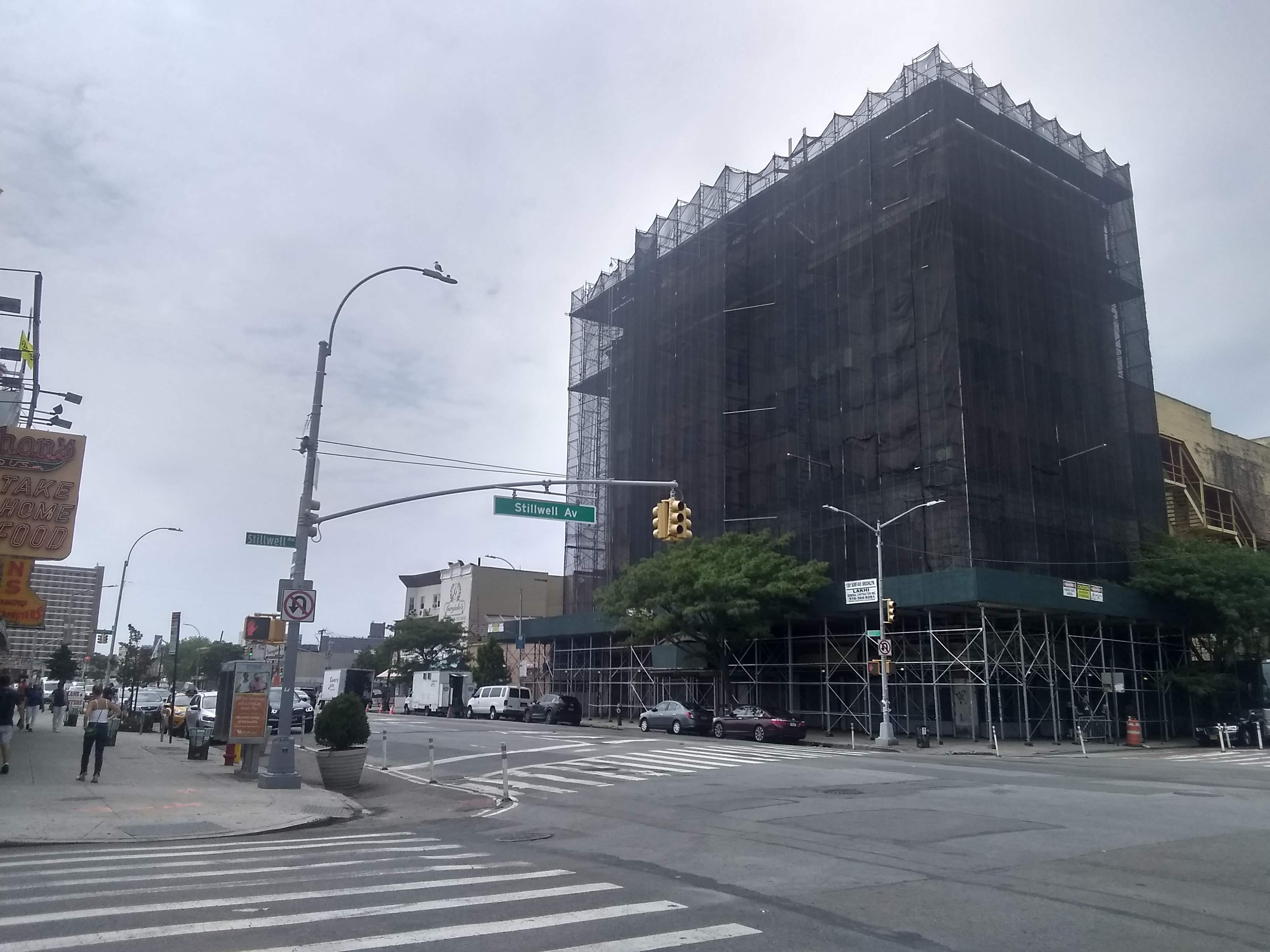
Reconstruction of Shore Theater into hotel, seen in 2019

The building was sold in 1978 or 1979 to Kansas Fried Chicken owner Horace Bullard, who had bought numerous properties in Coney Island. Bullard unsuccessfully tried to renovate the theater into a hotel and casino. Despite the redevelopment of Coney Island in the early 2000s, the Shore Theater was not developed and continued to rot. Squatters and graffiti writers started to frequent the structure, and while the electricity still worked, the floor was littered with rubble, according to pictures taken in 2006 by area historian Charles Denson. Few people were allowed inside the building, which was heavily guarded; security was increased after a blogger was able to break in and take several images of the building. The theater was made an official city landmark by the New York City Landmarks Preservation Commission in 2010.

In January 2016, developer Pye Properties purchased the Shore Theater for $14 million. No official decision was made at first, though a hotel and entertainment complex were proposed. At the time, the cost of the retail space in the theater was estimated at $75 per square foot ($810/m^{2}). Then, in August 2018, it was announced that a 50-room boutique hotel was being planned within the former Shore Theater. If built, the hotel would be the first to be constructed in Coney Island in more than half a century. Gerner Kronick + Valcarcel Architects presented a design in January 2019, and after some minor changes, the Landmarks Preservation Commission approved a revised design that March. Under the revised plan, there will be a spa and shops on the ground floor, as well as hotel rooms in the former office space. According to the developers, the hotel was to have been completed in 2021. The renovation did not begin until early 2023.

== Description ==
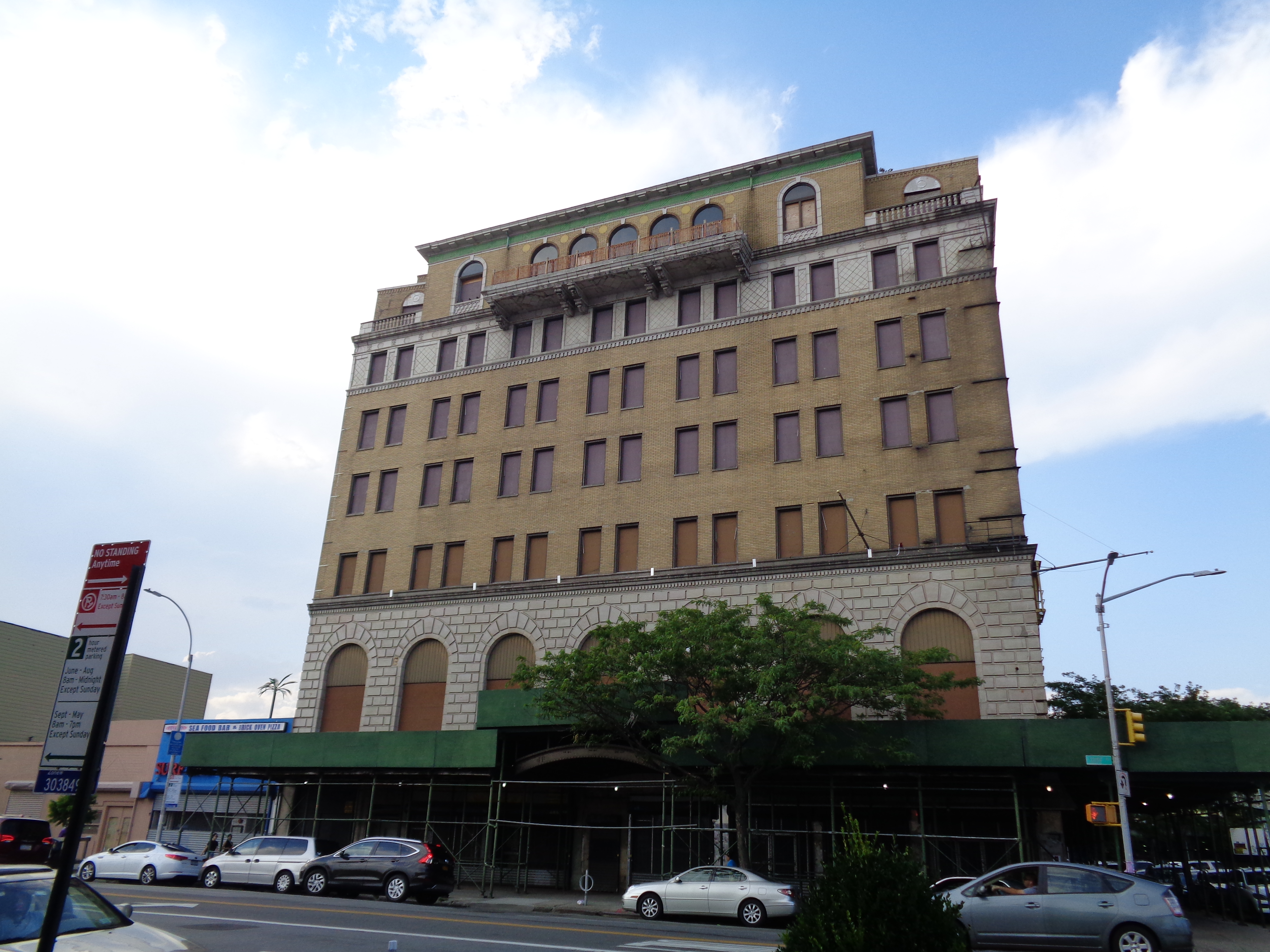
Southern facade of the Shore Theater. From bottom to top: the ground floor, double-height piano nobile, four levels of offices, and the attic

The southern portion of the Shore Theater (facing Surf Avenue) housed the offices, while the northern portion (away from Surf Avenue) housed the theater. The ground level contained storefronts housed within several bays. Above the ground floor is a double-height piano nobile along the southern and part of the eastern and western facades, which contains semicircular-topped windows corresponding to the bays below. The third through fifth floors have buff-colored brick exteriors and a pair of rectangular windows in each bay. The sixth floor has a similar window layout but with a terracotta exterior and a frieze above it. The seventh floor was the top floor and contained buff brick exteriors, a frieze above it, and architectural setbacks at the corners.

=== Exterior ===
The southern facade along Surf Avenue contains various storefronts, as well as a cornice above the ground level. The southern facade contains seven bays, the westernmost of which contains a rolldown gate that conceals a driveway. A doorway just to the east of the driveway contains rope molding, dressed stone blocks surrounding the doorway, and a carved stone marquee above it with the words "Coney Island Theatre Building". Dressed stone also surrounds another doorway under the marquee, as well as the piers at the extreme ends on the Surf and Stillwell Avenue facades. The seventh floor contains a central pavilion with five bays, containing terracotta ornamentation, as well as a porch. A vertical sign with the words "SHORE" was located at the southeastern corner, near the intersection of Surf and Stillwell Avenues, but was damaged and not replaced after Hurricane Sandy in 2012.

The eastern facade on Stillwell Avenue also contains storefronts on the ground level. The office-building section to the south is similar to the southern facade, but the movie-theater facade is plain brick. The office building section contains three bays; on the piano nobile level, there are two narrow rectangular windows in between the two northernmost bays. The windows on the third through sixth floors do not correspond to the bays below, and there are seven windows on each floor. The northern part of the facade consists of a windowless blank wall with an emergency staircase from the theater affixed to it.

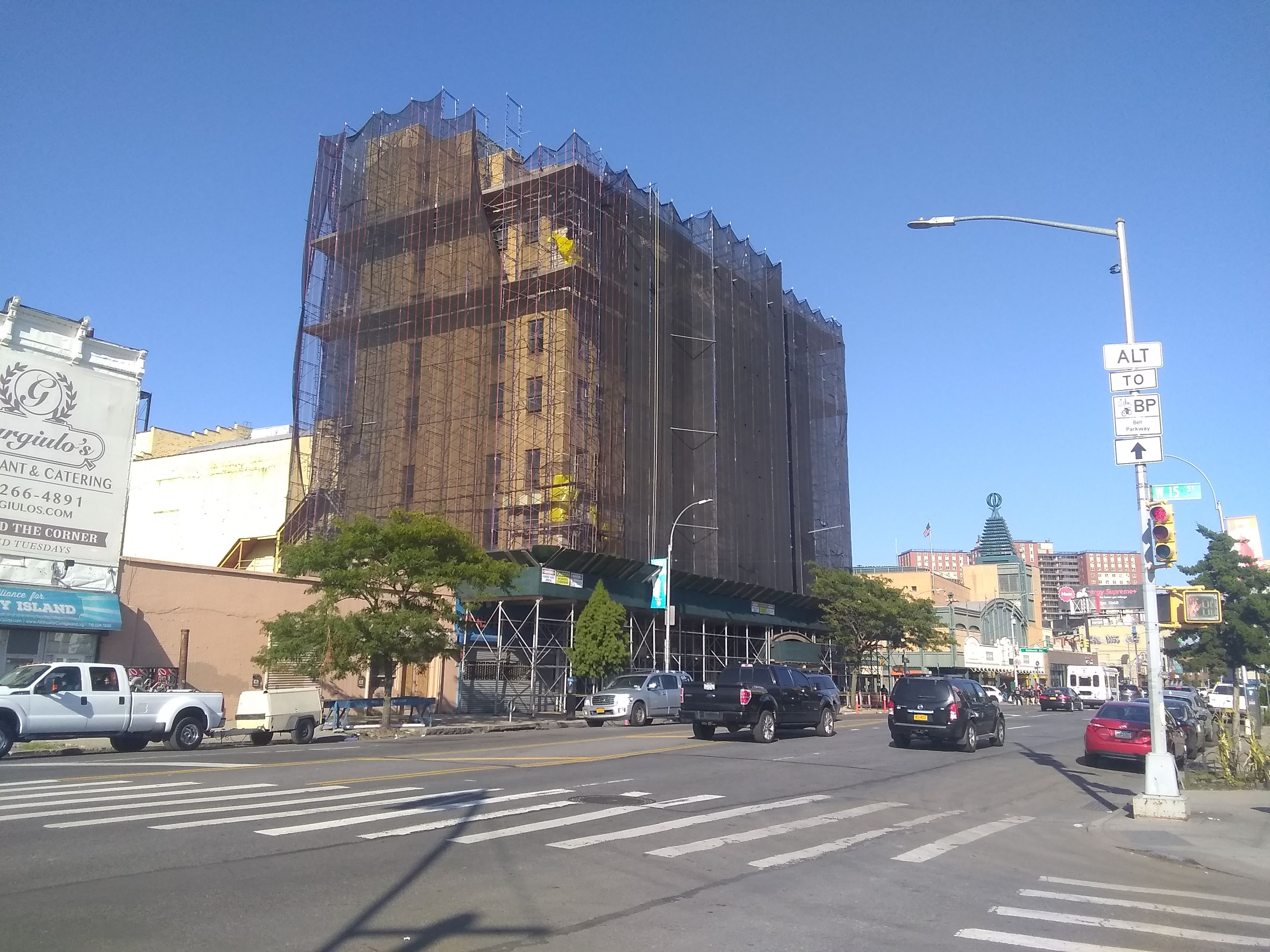
Seen from the west, September 2019

The western and northern facades, both of which originally faced neighboring structures, contain a simple design. On the southern part of the western facade, the wall is made of brick and there are three windows on each floor. The northern part of the western facade is a blank wall with an emergency staircase. The northern facade does not have any windows, but instead consist of slightly projecting blank walls.

=== Interior ===
The Shore Theater had an auditorium in its northern portion, which in its heyday could fit 2,472 patrons. The theater contains a 150-foot (46 m) domed ceiling. Charles Denson's pictures in 2006 showed that the theater contained several motifs that show the Halve Maen, a Dutch flyboat commandeered by Henry Hudson, as well as dancing mermaids. According to a blog post by Denson, there was also a mosaic fountain at the mezzanine level, marble columns, and a lobby ceiling with nautical-themed lighting fixtures. A plaster artwork on the ceiling outside the auditorium was too badly damaged to be repaired.

Commercial space occupied the first floor of the building's southern portion, while there was office space above it. These spaces were used by such tenants as a Head Start children's program, a Medicaid office, an office for a cigar company, and a dress manufacturer. The commercial space was occupied by a bar and then a Kansas Fried Chicken.
