= Alwani =

Alwani is an Arabic surname. Notable people with the surname include:

- Maamoon Sami Rasheed al-Alwani (1957–2021), Iraqi politician
- Zainab Alwani (born 1962), Islamic scholar
