= Jeffrey Gros =

American Catholic ecumenist and theologian

Brother Jeffrey Gros FSC (7 January 1938 – 12 August 2013) was an American Catholic ecumenist and theologian. A member of the De La Salle Christian Brothers, Gros had served as a high school history teacher, university professor, associate director of the Secretariat for Ecumenical and Interreligious Affairs at the United States Conference of Catholic Bishops; director of Faith and Order for the National Council of Churches; and president of the Society for Pentecostal Studies. He is the author or editor of over 20 books, 310 articles, and an uncounted number of book reviews. He died of pancreatic cancer in Chicago, IL, on 12 August 2013 at the age of 75.

== Early life and education ==
Born John Jefferson Gros in Memphis, TN, to Jeff Gros and Faye (Dickinson) Gros, he entered the novitiate of the Christian Brothers in August 1955 in Glencoe, MO. He made his perpetual vows in the same order in 1963 in Plano, IL. He has one sister, Sister Joye Gros.

He earned a Bachelor of Arts degree (in 1959) and a Master of Education focused in Biology Education (in 1962) from Saint Mary's University of Minnesota; a Master of Arts in Theology from Marquette University in Milwaukee in 1965, with a thesis titled "Ministry and Orders in the United Presbyterian Church, USA". He was awarded a Doctorate in Theology from Fordham University, New York City, in 1973, for his dissertation "Transcendence and Community in Contemporary Social Theory: P. Berger and R. Bellah" under the direction of Wayne Proudfood.

He pursued graduate research in biology and the sciences at the University of Colorado in Boulder, CO and at the Illinois Institute of Technology from 1961 to 1962. He continued graduate work in science at Northwestern University in Chicago from 1962 to 1964.

Research and study grants took him to Hebrew Union College, Jerusalem (1968), Germany (1969), Costa Rica (1986), the Far East (1976), Latin America (1980, 2000), Africa (1988), Strasbourg Ecumenical Research Institute (1991), Columbia (2007) and Chile (2008).

== Academic and professional career ==
Brother Jeff’s first responsibilities were as a high school teacher. He spent three years at St. George High School in Evanston, IL (1959–1962), and then a year at the La Salle Institute in Glencoe, MO, finally a year at Christian Brothers College High School (CBCHS) in St. Louis, MO, before spending two years at Marquette to work on his MA in Theology.

On the completion of his master's degree, he spent a year each teaching at his order’s novitiate in Glencoe, MO; at Lewis College in Romeoville, IL; back at CBCHS, and finally at the Christian Brothers College in Memphis, TN, before heading to Fordham for doctoral studies.

For two years (1970–1972), while writing his dissertation, he also worked as Director of Religious Education at St. Augustine Parish in the Bronx, NY. Upon completion, he was called back to Memphis to serve as a teacher in, then chair of, the theology department at Christian Brothers College (now Christian Brothers University), where he served for nine years (1972–1981). From 1975, he concurrently taught at Memphis Theological Seminary. During these years, he also served as the director of diaconate formation for the diocese of Memphis.

In 1981, Gros was hired as the Executive Director of the Faith and Order Commission of the National Council of Churches (NCC), then headquartered in the Bronx. At the same time, he assisted at the Church of the Good Shepherd, in Manhattan.

After a decade of leadership in the NCC, Gros was asked to serve as Associate Director of the Secretariat for Ecumenical and Interreligious Affairs of the United States Conference of Catholic Bishops (then called the National Conference of Catholic Bishops). He held this post, with responsibilities for ecumenical relations with the western churches and ecclesial communities (Anglican, Mainline Protestant, Evangelical, Pentecostal) until 2005.

At the age of 67, he “retired” to university and seminary teaching. He spent four years as Distinguished Professor of Ecumenical and Historical Theology at Memphis Theological Seminary, which is affiliated with the Cumberland Presbyterian Church. In 2009, he accepted a one-year appointment to the Franciscan School of Theology, part of the Graduate Theological Union, in Berkeley, California, as Kenan Osborne Visiting Professor of Theology.

For the last two years of his life, Gros taught at Lewis University in Romeoville, IL, as Catholic Studies Scholar in Residence. He served at the same time as an adjunct professor at the Catholic Theological Union in Chicago, and as President of the Society for Pentecostal Studies.

Gros had served several times on the board of the North American Academy of Ecumenists, including a term as president. He was, since 1985, the dean of the USCCB Institute for Ecumenical Leadership, which provided training for diocesan ecumenical officers.

He had many professional memberships including the Catholic Theological Society of America (former Board Member), College Theological Society, National Association of Evangelicals, Catholic Association of Diocesan Ecumenical and Interreligious Officers (Associate).

He was deeply committed to the reception of ecumenical dialogues into religious education and pastoral practice, and worked tirelessly in developing and supporting new generations of ecumenists. He was known for having an “encyclopedic knowledge of ecumenism” and was invited as keynote speaker for dialogues and conferences around the world.

He is interred at Resurrection Cemetery, Romeoville, IL.

== Bibliography ==
- The Search for Visible Unity: Baptism, Eucharist, Ministry (1984), editor
- Changing Contexts of Our Faith (1985), contributor
- Christ in East and West (1987), contributor
- Building Unity: Ecumenical Dialogues with Roman Catholic Participation in the USA (1989), editor, with Joseph Burgess
- Growing Consensus I (1991), editor, with Joseph Burgess
- Common Witness to the Gospel: Documents on Anglican-Roman Catholic Relations, 1983–1995 (1997), editor
- Introduction to Ecumenism (1998), with Ann Riggs, Eamon McManus.
- Deepening Communion: International Ecumenical Documents with Roman Catholic Participation (1998) with William G Rusch
- The Fragmentation of the Church and its Unity in Peacemaking (2001), editor
- That All May Be One: Ecumenism, in The Effective DRE Theology Series (2001)
- Growing Consensus II (2001), editor, with Joseph Burgess and Lydia Veliko
- John Baptist de la Salle: The Spirituality of Christian Education (2004), contributor
- The Church as Koinonia of Salvation; Its Structures and Ministries (2005), editor with Randall Lee
- Growth in Agreement II (2005) with Lydia Veliko
- That the World May Believe: Essays on Mission and Unity in Honour of George Vandervelde (2005), contributor
- The Ecumenical Christian Dialogues and the Catechism of the Catholic Church (2006), with Daniel Mulhall
- Handing on the Faith in an Ecumenical World (2006)
- Growth in Agreement III (2007), editor
- The Orders of Ministry: Problems and Prospects (2007), contributor
- The Lord’s Supper: Five Views (2008), contributor
- Evangelization and Religious Freedom: Ad Gentes, Dignitatis Humanae in Rediscovering Vatican II series (2009), with Stephan Bevans
- Growth in Agreement IV (2013), with Thomas Best, John Gibaut, Lorelei Fuchs, Despina Prassas

=== Articles, papers, and other publications ===
Gros published well over 300 papers and articles; He had book reviews published in over three dozen journals.

His first article was "Self Acceptance and Religious Maturity" in Spiritual Life, in the Summer of 1967.

His last was probably "Appreciating the Past and Looking to the Future" which he sent to Koinonia, the Newsletter of the Office of Ecumenism and Interreligious Dialogue published by the Paulist Fathers, just ten days before he died in August 2013.

== Honors and awards ==
- Chicago Heart Association Fellowship, 1960–61
- National Science Foundation Fellowship, 1961–64
- Consortium Ecumenism Award, Washington Theological Consortium, 2008
- Doctorate in Humane Letters, honoris causa, Manhattan College,
- Doctorate in Educational Leadership, honoris causa, St. Mary's University of Minnesota, April 2011
- The Bro. Jeffrey Gros, FSC Award of the North American Academy of Ecumenists, in memoriam
