= Washington Theological Consortium =

Coordinates: 38.9305°N 76.9984°W

The Washington Theological Consortium is an ecumenical organization of Christian theological schools and interfaith partners located in Washington, DC, Virginia, Maryland, and Pennsylvania. Members cooperate to deepen ecumenical unity in theological education and to broaden interfaith dialogue and understanding and to prepare both clergy and laity with skills they need to minister in a diverse church and society. The Consortium is one of the most diverse of its kind in the nation, as it includes Roman and Byzantine Catholic traditions, mainline Protestants, Evangelicals, and Historic Black Divinity schools; with partners in spiritual formation, Jewish, and Islamic education.

A student enrolled at the master's level or above at a member institution may cross-register into courses offered by other member schools. In addition, a student or faculty member of one member institution may use and borrow from other institutions' libraries. Students (and members of the public) may also enroll in one of four Certificates of Study through the Consortium: Ecumenism, Muslim-Christian Studies, Ecology and Theology, and Criminal Justice and Reconciliation. Events for faculty development, student dialogue, and public education are held throughout the year.

In 2004, the Consortium became the first group of its kind in the United States to include an Islamic graduate school, the Graduate School of Islamic and Social Sciences (GSISS), as an affiliate. The Consortium does shared programming with GSISS—now an institute, and with the Institute for Islamic, Christian, and Jewish Studies in Baltimore, the Paulist Father's House of Mission and Studies, and the Shalem Institute for Spiritual Formation. In 2020, it welcomed the Washington, DC–based Museum of the Bible as its first member under the category of "public educational institution".

== Members, associates, and affiliates ==
Members

- Byzantine Catholic Seminary of SS. Cyril and Methodius (Pittsburgh)
- Catholic University of America School of Theology and Religious Studies (Washington, DC northeast)
- Howard University School of Divinity (Washington, DC northwest)
- John Leland Center for Theological Studies (Arlington, Virginia)
- Pontifical Faculty of the Immaculate Conception at the Dominican House of Studies (Washington, DC northeast)
- Reformed Theological Seminary—Washington, DC (Mclean, Virginia)
- Samuel Dewitt Proctor School of Theology at Virginia Union University (Richmond, Virginia)
- United Lutheran Seminary (Gettysburg and Philadelphia)
- Virginia Theological Seminary (Alexandria, Virginia)
- Wesley Theological Seminary (Washington, DC northwest and downtown)

Associates and Affiliates

- Paulist Fathers' House of Mission and Studies
- Shalem Institute for Spiritual Formation
- The Graduate School of Islamic and Social Sciences
- Institute for Islamic, Christian, and Jewish Studies

Public Educational Institution

- Museum of the Bible

== History ==
The Washington Theological Consortium was conceived in 1969 in the wake of ecumenical accomplishments by the World Council of Churches, the Faith and Order Commission, the National Council of Churches, and the Second Vatican Council. The founding schools included the Catholic University School of Theology, the Dominican House of Studies, St. Paul's College, Wesley Theological Seminary, Virginia Theological Seminary, the Howard University School of Divinity, and the Lutheran Theological Seminary at Gettysburg. They joined forces to begin cross registration, library sharing, team taught Consortium courses, administrative consultations, and faculty development. In the early 21st century, schools have joined from Baptist, African-American, Reformed, and Byzantine Catholic traditions, and associates and affiliates have joined from institutes of Spirituality and Interfaith work, including the Shalem Institute, GSISS, and the Institute for Islamic Christian and Jewish Studies. In 2020, the Museum of the Bible joined as a "public educational institution".

The Board of Trustees of the Consortium has always included public trustees in order to ensure that its mission remains focused on the needs of both laity and clergy and to avoid competition between the member schools and institutions. These trustees serve to remind all members of the wider, public vision of theological education. Dedicated members of the Board have funded three annual public events: the Tachmindji Event for Interfaith Dialogue, the Figel Lecture in Ecumenism, and the Taha Al-Alwani Lectures in Muslim-Christian Dialogue.

== Programs and services ==
The Consortium offers services of cross-registration of courses and combined library use among students and faculty of its member schools and institutions. It offers regular consultations between presidents of its schools, academic deans, librarians, and other administrative or affinity groups. It offers over 250 courses per semester for cross-registration, a dozen theological libraries with 2.2 million books and journals for research, and regular gatherings of school leaders to enhance their collaboration. In addition to member libraries, students and faculty of the Consortium can also draw from other local academic libraries, including Woodstock Theological Library at Georgetown University, the Taha Al-Alwani Library (formerly of GSISS), and an association with the Library of Congress that allows members to become research partners there.

Theological faculties of member schools are served by the annual Faculties' Convocation, which addresses timely issues of theological education, and by interest area gatherings in Bible, Theology, History, Practical Theology, Worship / Homiletics, Arts and Religion, Science and Religion and more. Faculty area groups in Ecology and in Criminal Justice also oversee the certificates of study in those areas, and the opportunities for team teaching or professor exchanges are coordinated with the academic deans. Joint grant writing and publishing between faculty members are also encouraged through WTC networks.

Students are served through a Student Board, which has representatives from each of the theological schools. The Student Board develops and leads three student events a year: including an Opening Prayer Service and Dinner Conversation, a Sermon Slam, with stellar preachers from each of the schools, and other social or academic events. They also plan and lead the annual Prayer Service for Christian Unity, which precedes the Figel Event on Ecumenism.

== Public outreach ==
The public mission of the Consortium is defined by its three annual public events: The annual Tachmindji Event for Interfaith Dialogue is made possible by an endowment given by Diane Tachmindji. The event has included notable speakers such as Dr. Leonard Swidler of Temple University, Dr. Marc Gopin of the Center for World Religions, Diplomacy, and Conflict Resolution at George Mason University; Dr. Lisa Schirch of the Center for Justice and Peacebuilding at Eastern Mennonite University; Joseph Montville, former U.S. diplomat and Senior Associate at the Center for Strategic and International Studies; Dr. Mohamed Abu-Nimmer of the School of International Service at American University, Khizr Khan, Esq., speaker at the 2016 Democratic National Convention and Gold Star father of Cpt. Humayun Khan; Aaron David Miller of the Woodrow Wilson International Center for Scholars, and young peace-builders Mahmoud Jabari and Doron Shapir from the Seeds of Peace organization.

The annual Figel Address on Ecumenism is made possible by the ongoing support of ecumenist Jack Figel. The evening celebrates the Prayer Service for Christian Unity, the presentation of the Consortium Ecumenism Award, and significant lectures on ecumenism by award recipients. In recent years, recipients and lecturers have included Dr. Margaret O'Gara (Roman Catholic) of St. Michael's College at the University of Toronto; Dr. Mel Robeck (Pentecostal) of Fuller Theological Seminary; Dr. Justo Gonzalez (Methodist), founder of the Association of Hispanic Theological Education; Dr. John Ford, CSC (Roman Catholic) of the Catholic University of America, Dr. Joseph Small (Presbyterian) of the Center for Catholic and Evangelical Theology, Dr. John Erickson (Eastern Orthodox) of St. Vladimir's Seminary, and Rev. Dr. Paul McParltan (Roman Catholic) of the Catholic University of America.

The Taha Al-Alwani Lectures in Muslim-Christian Dialogue are made possible by the support of the Heritage Trust in honor of Dr. Taha Jabir Al-Alwani, noted Islamic scholar, educator, and pioneer in interfaith dialogue. This event features lectures by an Islamic and Christian scholar, and it has included significant lectures by Dr. Zainab Alwani of the Howard University School of Divinity; Dr. Abdul-Aziz Said of the School of International Service at American University; Dr. Richard Jones, the holder of the Alwani Chair in Muslim Christian Dialogue at the Washington Theological Consortium; Dr. Waleed el-Ansary of Xavier University, Azizah Y. al-Hibri, Esq., formerly of the University of Richmond School of Law and founder of Karamah: Muslim Women Lawyers for Human Rights; Dr. Wilhelmus Valkenberg of the Catholic University of America; Dr. Seyed Amir Akrami, Luce Scholar at Eastern Mennonite University and Lecturer at Yale Divinity School; Dr. Amr Abdalla of the Institute for Peace and Security Studies at Addis Ababa University, Ethiopia; Ambassador Anthony Quainton of the School of International Service at American University; Dr. Sulayman Nyang of the Howard University; Dr. Kwasi Kwakye-Nuako of the Howard University School of Divinity; Dr. Abdulaziz Sachedina of George Mason University, Dr. Daniel Madigan, SJ, of Georgetown University, Dr. Sathianathan Clark from Wesley Theological Seminary, and Dr. Salih Sayilgan from Georgetown University.

== The Consortium Ecumenism Award ==
For over two decades, the Washington Theological Consortium has given the Consortium Ecumenism Award annually to individuals who have made significant contributions to the scholarship, teaching, and/or practical advancement of Christian ecumenism and ecumenical dialogue. The recipients have included some of the most notable names in ecumenism over the last generation. They include:

- Rev. Joan Brown Campbell of the National Council of Churches, American Baptist and Disciples of Christ minister;
- Mary and Gordon Cosby of the Church of the Savior, Washington, DC;
- Dr. Paul Crow, formerly General Secretary of the Council on Church Union, noted ecumenist of the Christian Church, Disciples of Christ;
- Rev. Dr. Vincent Cushing, OFM of the Washington Theological Union;
- Bishop Mark Dyer of Virginia Theological Seminary;
- Rev. Dr. John H. Erickson, Dean emeritus of St. Vladimir's Orthodox Theological Seminary;
- Rev. Joseph Fitzmyer, SJ, of the Catholic University of America;
- Rev. Dr. John Ford, CSC of the Catholic University of America;
- Rev. Dr. Reginald H. Fuller of Virginia Theological Seminary;
- Dr. Justo L. Gonzalez of the Association of Hispanic Theological Education, noted author and scholar in the United Methodist Church;
- Bro. Jeffrey Gros, FSC of the United States Conference of Catholic Bishops, noted Catholic ecumenist;
- Bishop Thomas J. Hoyt, Jr. of the Christian Methodist Episcopal Church;
- Metropolitan Kallistos of Diokleia (Timothy Ware), Auxiliary bishop of the Greek Orthodox Archdiocese of Thyateira and Great Britain, Ecumenical Patriarchate, Eastern Orthodox Church;
- Dr. Diedra Kriewald of the United Methodist Church;
- Dr. Margaret O’Gara of St. Michael's College, University of Toronto;
- Rev. Dr. John H. Reumann of the Lutheran Theological Seminary in Philadelphia;
- Dr. Cecil (Mel) Robeck of Fuller Theological Seminary, noted ecumenist in the Pentecostal churches;
- Rev. Dr. Theodore Schneider, Bishop of the Evangelical Lutheran Church in America;
- Dr. Joseph Small, former director of the Office of Theology and Worship, Presbyterian Church USA;
- Most Rev. Walter F. Sullivan, Bishop of Richmond, Virginia, Roman Catholic Church;
- Rev. Georges Tavard A.A., noted ecumenist of the Roman Catholic Church;
- Archbishop Vsevolod of Scopelos, Ruling Hierarch of the Western Eparchy of the Ukrainian Orthodox Church of the USA, Ecumenical Patriarchate;
- Dr. Geoffrey Wainwright, noted Methodist ecumenist and professor at Duke Divinity School.
