= Mohammad Qatanani =

Iman of the Islamic Center of Passaic County in New Jersey

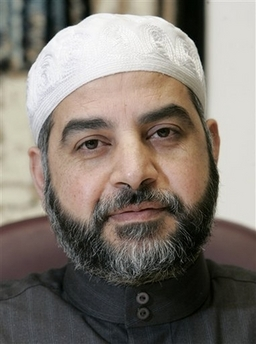
- Born: Mohammad Ahmad Hasan Qatanani; Askar, Palestine
- Occupation: Imam

Mohammad Ahmad Hasan Qatanani (born 1964) is the Imam of the Islamic Center of Passaic County in New Jersey. Mohammad Ahmad Hasan Qatanani migrated to America in 1996 as the Imam of the Islamic Center of Passaic County. Qatanani has a Ph.D. in Islamic studies from Jordanian University.

Mohammad Ahmad Hasan Qatanani and his family were faced with deportation from the United States because he allegedly failed to disclose in a green card application that he was a member of Hamas, an organization regarded by the U.S. and the European Union as terrorist; officials were relying on a report that Israeli forces had arrested and convicted him as a Hamas member in 1993. Qatanani contends that he was never formally arrested nor charged with a crime, but rather was among the hundreds of Palestinians detained during a 1993 uprising. He further contends that he was convicted in absentia and faced severely harsh interrogation tactics that Israel's highest court subsequently banned as torture. A U.S. Immigration Judge subsequently declined to deport Mohammad Qatanani and his family and granted them permanent residency in 2008. The Department of Homeland Security appealed through the New Jersey Immigration Court of Appeals. Following an extended period of motions, litigation and review, a ruling by the Board of Immigration Appeals returned the case to the same judge's court in December 2016 for relitigation on the original action.

== Early life and education in Jordan ==
Qatanani was born to Ahmad Hasan Qatanani (1936–2005) and Ayisha Qatanani (born 1941) in the town of Askar in Palestine. Qatanani has 7 siblings, 3 brothers (Hasan, Taha, and Yaseen) and 4 sisters (Aminah, Wafa', Maryam, and Sumaia). Qatanani's brother-in-law was a senior Hamas military leader and killed by the Israelis.

Qatanani lived in a Palestinian refugee camp until he finished high school (1982) and received a scholarship to study at the College of Amman, located in Jordan. Qatanani finished his bachelor's degree in Islamic law in 1985 and then continued to study until he received a master's degree from the Jordanian University in Islamic jurisprudence in 1989. After a one-year break, Qatanani returned to the Jordanian University to work on his Ph.D. on Islamic jurisprudence which he received in 1996.

After receiving his bachelor's degree, Qatanani worked as an imam for several different mosques in Amman, Jordan until 1989. In 1989, Qatanani got a job as a full-time Imam of Abu-Qoura Mosque in Amman, Jordan. He worked there until 1996.

Qatanani was accused of pleading guilty in 1993 to aiding and being a member of Hamas. He was also accused that was sentenced to three months in prison. However, Qatanani has denied being a Hamas member and said he was detained, not arrested, by the Israelis while traveling to his native West Bank in 1993. He said he was not notified of the charges against him nor his conviction and that he was mentally and physically abused while in detention. On his green card application, Qatanani had answered "no" to a question asking applicants whether they had been arrested, fined, charged or imprisoned. The Department of Homeland Security was unable to provide substantial evidence that Qatanani was arrested, convicted, fined, charged or imprisoned.

== Imam in the U.S. ==
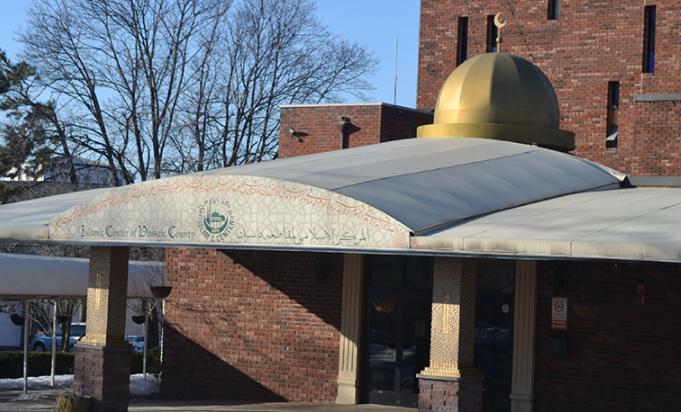
The Islamic Center of Passaic County, New Jersey, U.S.

In 1996 Qatanani migrated with his family to America on a religious work visa. Qatanani became the Imam of the Islamic Center of Passaic County (ICPC) in Paterson, New Jersey, the second largest Muslim community in the U.S.. He is also a Member of the Fiqh Council of North America and gave lectures at the Islamic American University, a subsidiary of the Muslim American Society (MAS). Qatanani was a speaker at an Islamic Association of Palestine conference in Chicago in 1999.

In 1999, Qatanani applied for a U.S. Green Card without disclosing that he had been in Israeli detention for three months in 1993. Qatanani contends that he never received word of any charges or convictions against him during his three months in police custody, and therefore was not lying on the immigration form. Government officials learned of Qatanani's detention when Qatanani contacted the FBI in 2005 requesting assistance with his immigration application. In July 2006, the government denied his application, and deportation proceedings began against him, his wife and three of his six children.

According to Israeli records, he was "convicted of assisting terrorist organizations for referring Palestinian students arriving in Jordan" to join the Muslim Brotherhood, a student organization that was legal in Jordan, and the Hamas, which is on the U.S. State Department list of Foreign Terrorist Organizations. He helped Palestinian students find housing and get into Jordanian university, but says that he was unaware of any links to groups like Hamas and that he was not a member of Hamas.

In 2023, Qatanani lost 15 members as a result of indiscriminate bombing by Israel in Gaza during the Gaza war. It was reported that his family has been in Gaza ever since the Nakba.

== Interfaith ==
Qatanani has paved the way in New Jersey for common interfaith dialogue between different religions. He has spoken at more than 100 churches and synagogues across New Jersey.

== Trial ==
Character witnesses testifying for Qatanani included Roman Catholic and Episcopalian priests along with two county sheriffs who praised Qatanani for helping investigators become acquainted with cultural aspects of the Muslim community. On September 4, 2008, a U.S. Immigration Judge declined to deport and granted Mohammad Qatanani and his family permanent residency.

The Judge noted that the records obtained by Homeland Security officials from the Israelis were "too unreliable to prove that Mr. Qatanani has engaged in terrorist activities."

The lead government attorney drew criticism for reading passages from the Quran that indicated that God will cause unbelievers to "increase in illness." An attorney for the American Jewish Congress questioned the relevance of referring to Quranic passages in Qatanani's trial, explaining that the passages "showed no inclination towards violence" on Qatanani's part.

Rabbi Senter of Pompton Lakes, one of Qatanani's character witness who noted that Qatanani was "the most moderate individual you could imagine" was "shocked" to see the government attorney "use the tactics of hatemongers in an effort to tip the scales of justice."
