= St. Frances de Chantal's Church (Bronx) =

Church in New York, United States

Coordinates: 40°48′57″N 73°48′52″W

St. Frances de Chantal Church
- Interactive map of the St. Frances de Chantal Church area

General information
- Location: Bronx, New York City; 190 Hollywood Avenue, Bronx New York 10465, United States of America
- Completed: 1971
- Client: Roman Catholic Archdiocese of New York

Design and construction
- Architect: Paul Waldron Reilly (according to the American Architects Directory)

The Church of St. Frances de Chantal is a Roman Catholic parish church under the authority of the Roman Catholic Archdiocese of New York, located at Harding Avenue at Throggs Neck Blvd., Bronx, New York City. The parish was established in 1927.

The present Brutalist-style church structure was built 1971 to designs by Paul W. Reilly. Colorful chunks of stained glass are set directly into the concrete in the style of the then-contemporary European post-war stained-glass work. Larry Lawton was once an altar boy there.

The abstract style stained glass in the church was designed by Albinas Elksus. Correct spelling is Albinas Elskus. [1926-2007]

== Clergy and Staff ==
- Rev. Stephen A. Asomah - Administrator
- Rev. Dennis Iddamalgoda, O.M.I. - Parochial Vicar
- Rev. Michael McDonnell, OFM - Weekend Assistant
- Deacon George Coppola
- Sr. Joan Marie O’Leary, O.P. - Pastoral Associate
- Ms. Christi Chiapetti - Cantor/Coordinator of Religious Education
