= Zahira Abdin =

Egyptian paediatrician (1917–2002)

- زهيرة حافظ عابدين
- Born: June 15, 1917; Cairo, Egypt
- Died: 2002 (aged 84–85)
- Education: Cairo University
- Years active: 1942-2002
- Known for: Work fighting pediatric rheumatic heart disease in Egypt
- Spouse: Abdel Moneim Abdul Fadl
- Children: Mona Abul Fadl, Hoda Abdul Al-Fadl, Omar Abdul-Fadl, Adda Abdul Fadl
- Father: Hafez Hussein Abdin
- Awards: Republic’s Order of Merit of the First Degree; Fellow of the Royal College of Physicians; Elisabeth Norgall prize
- Honours: "Mother of Egyptian Doctors"

Zahira Hafez Abdin (Arabic: زهيرة حافظ عابدين), (June 15, 1917 – 2002) was an Egyptian paediatrician and specialist in rheumatic heart disease, known as the "Mother of Egyptian Medicine." She is also known for her extensive charitable work.

== Early life and education ==
Zahira Abdin was born on 15 June 1917 in Cairo. She was a daughter of Hafez Hussein Abdin, a lawyer, who also became a member of parliament. Her mother died when Abdin was three years old. She went to Heliopolis Primary School and the Princess Fawzia Secondary School. In 1936 she secured the top mark in the Thanaweya Amma as a baccalauréat . Following her graduation, Abdin studied medicine, specializing in pediatrics, at Cairo University. She was one of the first women to graduate from the medical school, and in 1942 became the first woman to serve on its staff.

== Academic and Medical Work ==
In 1951, Abdin established a private clinic in downtown Cairo.

In 1956 Zahira Abdin became assistant professor at Cairo University, and was made professor in 1966. She pioneered social pediatrics in the Middle East. At that time rheumatic heart disease was a leading cause of childhood mortality in Egypt. Zahira Abdin led the effort against it, establishing the Free Pyramid Rheumatic Heart Center in 1957, as well as its network of schools and clinics throughout Egypt . These clinics helped decrease infection rates from 60% to 1%. In the 1960s, Abdin was the first to identify the streptococcal strain causing the disease.

== Work in Charity and Education ==
Shortly after founding her clinic in Cairo, Abdin began her extensive charitable work. She pioneered community and preventative medicine in Egypt, establishing multiple academic and charitable organizations, including the Centre of Rheumatic Heart Diseases in Children, the Child's Health Institute, the Association of Friends of Children's Heart Diseases, two orphanages, a retirement home for women, and a department for low-cost surgery.

Abdin began working in education as a supervisor for the Society of Muslim Youth, an organization run by urban women focused on providing disadvantaged women with practical and religious tools to run healthy and religiously sound homes.

Around this time, Abdin realized that there was a need for foreign language Islamic schools in Egypt. With the expansion of economic opportunities under Anwar Sadat's Infitah policy, Abdin realized that there would be an increase in demand for foreign language education. She conceptualized a school type for Muslim youth to compete with the prestigious private Christian and foreign schools, while focusing on Islamic education. She wanted the students to have strong Islamic faith and values, while still being able to work in the secular, globalizing English-speaking world. With this in mind, she founded four private Islamic language schools, al-Tali'a.

In 1975 Abdin set up the Child Health Institute in Dokki, Cairo. She went on to the Private Islamic English Language School in 1978.

In 1986, Abdin set up the Dubai Medical College for Girls (DMCG). She continued to serve as the founding dean, and led the school to international recognition. Zahira Abdin also co-founded the Association of Egyptian Women Doctors, editing its journal's first issues.

At the request of the Ministry of Social Affairs, Abdin presided over the struggling Young Women's Muslim Association, leaving it stable after her twenty years work there.

In her work, Abdin's collaborated with a number or popular and political figures, including Umm Kulthum, Gamal Abdel Nasser, Anwar Sadat, Jehan Sadat, Suzanne Mubarak, and Hikmat Abu Zayd.

== Awards ==
Abdin was awarded the Republic’s Order of Merit of the First Degree. Abdin was the first Egyptian doctor, and the first Arab doctor, to become a Fellow of the Royal College of Physicians in London.

In 1990 the First Lady of Egypt, Suzanne Mubarak, awarded her the honorary title ‘Mother of Egyptian Doctors’. In 1991 she was the first woman from outside Europe to receive the Elisabeth Norgall prize.

== Personal life ==
In 1943, Abdin married Abdel Moneim Abdul Fadl, accompanying him to pursue a PhD in England. The pair had three daughters and one son. Mona Abul Fadl was a professor of political science at the Faculty of Economics and Political Science. Hoda Abdul Al-Fadl is a professor of pathology at Al-Qasr Al-Ayni. Omar Abdul-Fadl was an engineer. Adda Abdul Fadl, is Professor of Pediatrics at Benha University.
