= John Leland Center for Theological Studies =

Coordinates: 38.8856°N 77.1668°W

- Type: Private
- Established: 1998
- Affiliations: Baptist
- President: Kenneth R. Pruitt
- Location: Arlington County, Virginia, United States
- Website: http://www.leland.edu

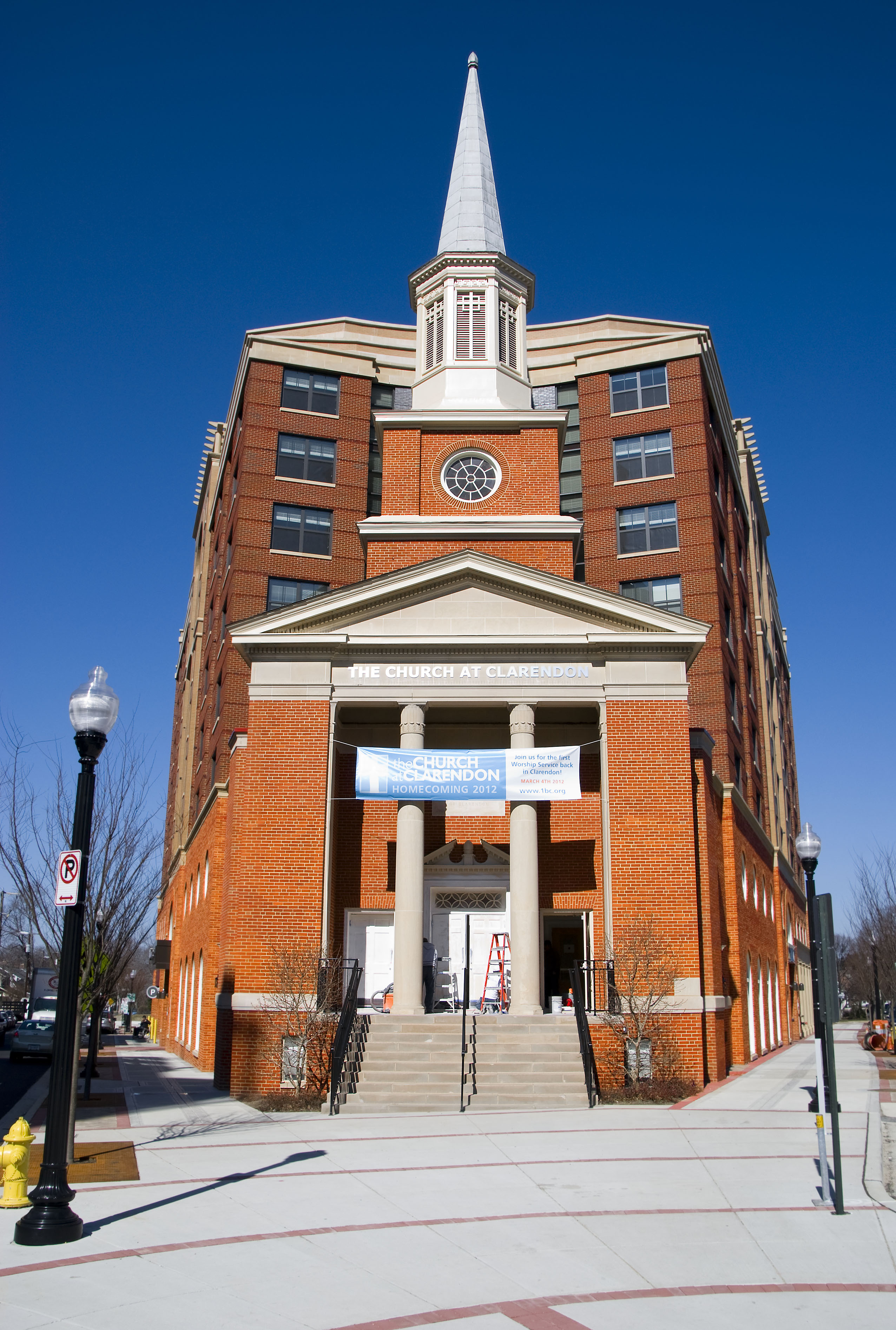
The Leland Center's Arlington campus is co-located with the Church at Clarendon, a Baptist church in Clarendon.

The John Leland Center for Theological Studies, known as Leland Seminary, is an American nondenominational theological institute in the Baptist tradition based in Arlington County, Virginia, with several satellite locations elsewhere in Virginia. Leland is partnered with the Baptist General Association of Virginia and the District of Columbia Baptist Convention, though the center has ties with a range of denominations and churches. Leland is a member of the Washington Theological Consortium.

The center's namesake, John Leland, was an 18th- and 19th-century Baptist minister in the United States who was a proponent of the separation of church and state and an opponent of theological seminaries.

== History ==
At a 1997 Baptist World Alliance meeting, several Baptist leaders discussed developing the Washington Metropolitan Area's first Baptist seminary. These individuals resolved to create the center which began offering classes the next year.

Randel Everett, the center's first president, stepped down in late 2006. Mark J. Olson became Leland's second president in 2007. In 2019, William H. Smith became Leland's president.

== Academics ==
The seminary is accredited by the Association of Theological Schools in the United States and Canada (ATS). The seminary offers the following ATS-approved degrees: Master of Divinity, Master of Christian Leadership, and Master of Theological Studies. The seminary also offers several graduate certificates.

Leland's School of Ministry offers the center's undergraduate-level courses, including a diploma in theology program. Students seeking a bachelor's degree may be able to transfer credit from the School of Ministry into two Bluefield College Bachelor of Arts degree programs.
