= Taha Jabir Alalwani =

Islamic scholar

Taha Jabir Al-Alwani
- طه جابر العلواني
- Born: 1935; Fallujah, Iraq
- Died: 4 March 2016 (aged 80–81); Shannon Airport (Ireland) on the way from Cairo to Washington, D.C.
- Occupations: Islamic scholar, jurist, professor, author
- Years active: ca. 1959–2016
- Known for: Islamic legal theory (uṣūl al-fiqh; minority fiqh for Muslims in non-Muslim societies)

Academic background
- Education: B.A., M.A., Ph.D. (Usūl al-Fiqh)
- Alma mater: al-Azhar University

Academic work
- Main interests: Islamic jurisprudence (fiqh), principles of jurisprudence (uṣūl al-fiqh), Islamic thought, minority Muslims’ jurisprudence
- Influenced: Development of fiqh al-aqallīyāt (jurisprudence for Muslim minorities)

Taha Jabir Al-Alwani (طه جابر علواني), Ph.D. (1935 – March 4, 2016) was an Iraqi Islamic scholar. He was a founder and chairman of the Fiqh Council of North America and served as president of Cordoba University in Ashburn, Virginia, United States. He also held the Imam Al-Shafi'i Chair in the Islamic Legal Theory at The Graduate School of Islamic and Social Sciences at Corboda University.

== Biography ==
Born in 1935 in Fallujah, Iraq, Al-Alwani received his high school diploma from al-Azhar University in Cairo, Egypt in 1953 and received his bachelor's from the College of Shari’ah and Law in 1959. He continued at the college and earned a master's degree in 1968 and a doctorate in Usul al-fiqh in 1973.

Following his undergraduate studies, Al-Alwani returned to Iraq and became a lieutenant in the Iraqi Military Reserves. He taught in the Military Academy of Iraq in Baghdad and was a professor at the College of Islamic Studies for 6 years.

He returned to al-Azhar in Egypt where he earned his PhD. He then taught at the Imam Muhammad ibn Saud University in Riyadh, Saudi Arabia for 10 years before he decided to immigrate to the United States in 1983 where he settled down in Northern Virginia for 23 years.

There he studied the history of several religious groups, specifically Jewish history and focused his attention on Rabbi Yohanan ben Zakay, who founded a well-known Jewish rabbinical center in Yavne, credited with paving the way to Rabbinical Judaism, after the destruction of the second Jewish temple. He held the first chair for an Islamic scholar in the Washington Theological Consortium.

Al-Alwani worked extensively on interfaith projects. He had a vast network of scholars from different religions. His work reflected moderate positions in Islamic scholarship, including a monograph he wrote against punishing apostasy.

== Personal life ==
Al-Alwani was married to Mona Abul-Fadl. The couple had two daughters, Zainab and Ruqaia, and a son, Ahmed.

Al-Alwani played the qanun and enjoyed listening to Arabic music such as maqam and Umm Kulthum. He spoke Arabic, English, Persian, and Turkish.

He died on 4 March 2016 on his way between Cairo and Washington.
