= St. Frances of Rome's Church (Bronx) =

Catholic parish church in New York, USA

Coordinates: 40°53′43″N 73°51′13″W

The Church of St. Frances of Rome
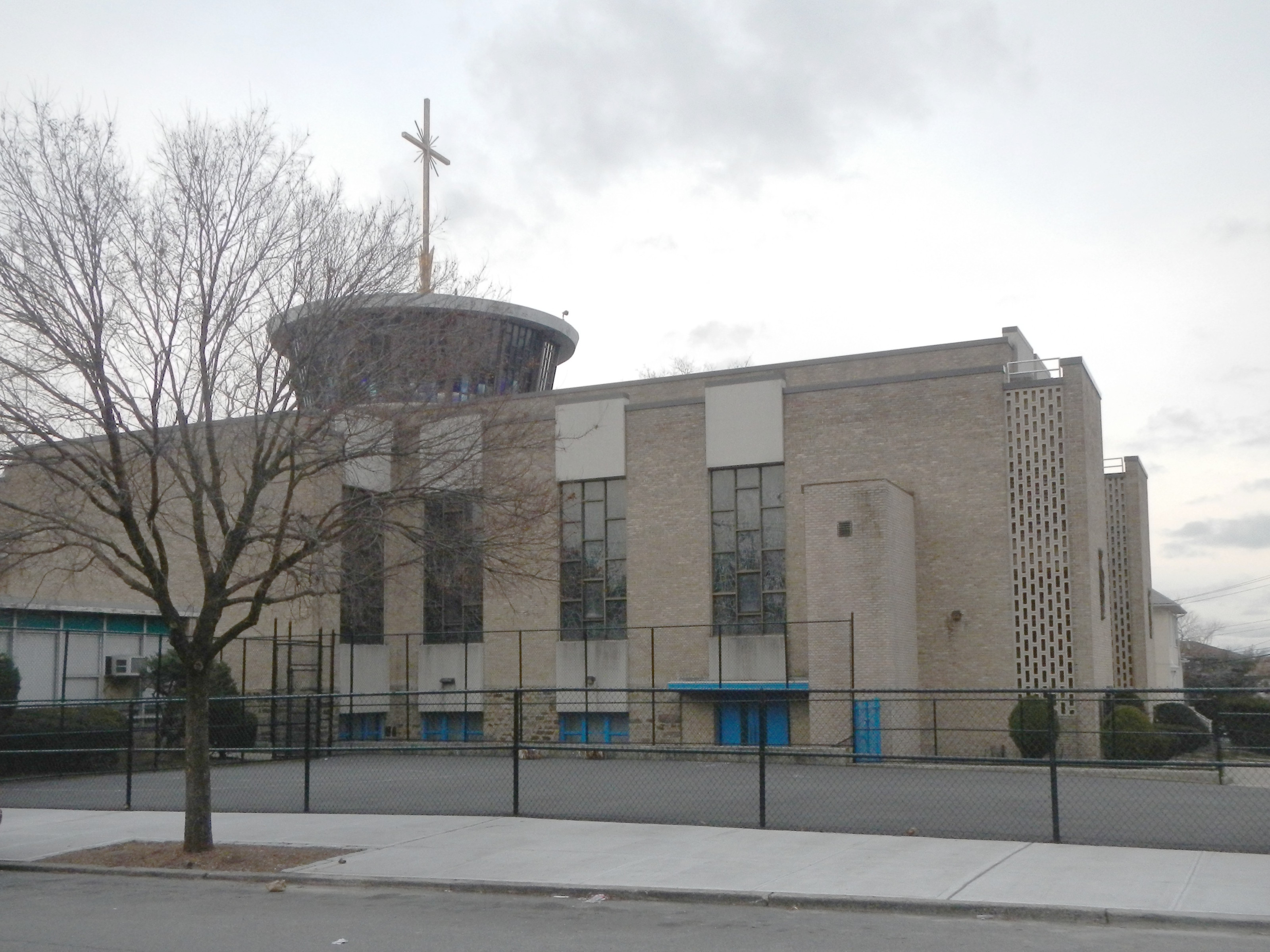
- Interactive map of the The Church of St. Frances of Rome area

General information
- Location: Bronx, New York City, United States of America
- Completed: 1967
- Client: Roman Catholic Archdiocese of New York

Design and construction
- Architect: Paul Waldron Reilly

The Church of St. Frances of Rome is a Roman Catholic parish church under the authority of the Roman Catholic Archdiocese of New York, located at 4307 Barnes Avenue Bronx, New York City. The parish was established in 1898.

The current building, built on the foundation of the older cruciform church, was dedicated in 1967 by Francis Cardinal Spellman. Its architect was Paul W. Reilly of 393 Seventh Avenue, New York City, New York 10001. It opened with a new pipe organ made by the Delaware Organ Company.

Its name honors St. Frances of Rome.
