= Horace Bullard =

American entrepreneur

Horace Bullard (1938-2013) was an American entrepreneur who founded the New York City based Kansas Fried Chicken chain, and later acquired properties in an ambitious proposal to revitalize Coney Island.

== Business ventures ==
Bullard started Kansas Fried Chicken, named after Max's Kansas City, when he was unable to secure a Kentucky Fried Chicken franchise. Bullard was from East Harlem, and of African American and Puerto Rican heritage, and infused flavors from these communities. The successful franchise eventually closed, though it has a legacy in the many unaffiliated Kennedy Fried Chicken restaurants that grew up afterward, largely started by people in the Afghan American community.

Bullard used some of his restaurant profits to accumulate properties in Coney Island, with an aim of reviving its amusement industry. He bought the Shore Theater and the Thunderbolt, and developed a plan for a new Steeplechase Park in 1985 that was initially projected to cost $55 million, and that earned the support of the Ed Koch administration. The succeeding Giuliani Administration was less supportive, and pushed the old Steeplechase site to be a minor league baseball stadium, which is known today as Maimonides Park. Giuliani also controversially ordered the demolition of the Thunderbolt without notice to its owner Bullard.
