= Jerry Mays =

Jerry Mays may refer to:

- Jerry Mays (defensive lineman) (1939–1994), American football player
- Jerry Mays (running back) (born 1967), American football player

== See also ==
- Gerry Mays (1921–2006), Scottish footballer
- Jerry May (disambiguation)
