= Islamic Center of Passaic County =

Mosque in Paterson, New Jersey, US

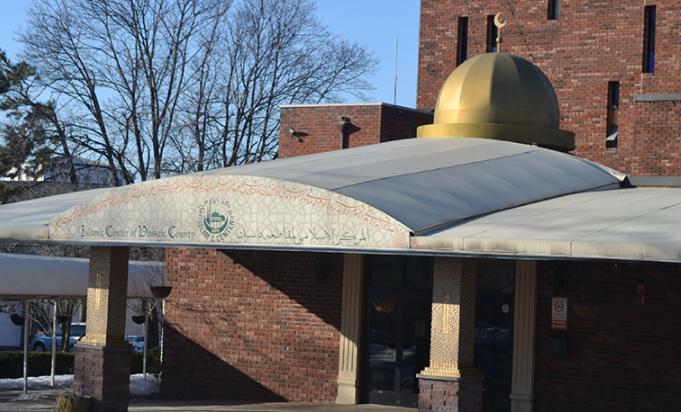

- Location in New Jersey

Religion
- Affiliation: Islam
- Ecclesiastical or organizational status: Mosque
- Leadership: Mohammad Qatanani; Osama Salhia
- Status: Active

Location
- Location: 152 Derrom Ave, Paterson, Passaic County, New Jersey
- Country: United States
- Interactive map of Islamic Center of Passaic County
- Coordinates: 40°55′04″N 74°08′26″W

Architecture
- Established: 1990

Website
- icpcnj.org

The Islamic Center of Passaic County is a mosque and Islamic cultural center on Derrom Avenue in Paterson, New Jersey, US. It is one of the largest mosques in New Jersey.

== History ==
In 1990, the Islamic Center of Passaic County was established the in Eastside Park of Paterson. The neighborhood next to it, South Paterson, is home to the largest Muslim community in the United States. The Islamic Center of Passaic County is among the largest Islamic communities in New Jersey, as well as the United States.

One co-founder of the Islamic Center was convicted in 2009 of funneling money to Hamas via the Holy Land Foundation for Relief and Development.

In 2019, Governor Phil Murphy visited the Paterson branch. This was the first time a New Jersey governor went to a mosque for a town hall in the history of the state. Murphy's opponent in the 2021 gubernatorial election, Jack Ciattarelli, visited the nearby Omar Mosque.

In March 2022, the ICPC hosted a donation drive for Ukrainian refugees following the start of the 2022 Russian invasion of Ukraine. The drive received many donations from the Mosque's community along with many non-Muslims in the county.

=== Islamic Center of Passaic County's Branches ===
In 2016, they opened their first branch in Clifton. Some of the Islamic Center of Passaic County's Quran memorization classes, which are divided into 3 levels, are done at the Clifton branch. In 2021, they opened up a third branch in Prospect Park. It is also known as Masjid Younis. The Islamic Center of Passaic County's bookstore is only in the Paterson mosque, which is the original and main branch of the organization.

=== Threat following NYC truck attack ===
The Islamic Center of Passaic County was victim to hate-fueled phone calls following the 2017 New York City truck attack. Omar Awad, president of the Islamic Center of Passaic County at the time said the calls were profane. He also said callers threatened to burn down the mosque, and go to the mosque to kill him. Others said to get out of the country.

== Interfaith ==
Mohammad Qatanani has been one of the Imams at the Islamic Center of Passaic County since 1996. He is the founder of "Muslim-Christian Dialogue of New Jersey". He also participated in the UPF-USA's ninth weekly Interfaith Prayer. In the past the Islamic Center of Passaic County hosted Interfaith Iftars.
