= Gerald May =

American psychiatrist (1940–2005)

Gerald Gordon May
- Born: June 12, 1940; Hillsdale, Michigan
- Died: April 8, 2005 (aged 64); Baltimore, Maryland
- Other name: Jerry May
- Occupation: Psychiatrist

Gerald Gordon May (June 12, 1940 – April 8, 2005) was an American psychiatrist and theologian.

He conducted workshops in contemplation and psychology, and wrote several books on how to combine spiritual direction with psychological treatment.

== Early life ==
May was born June 12, 1940, in Hillsdale, Michigan. He was the half-brother of the existential psychologist Rollo May who was 30 years older. Their father died when May was nine years old. He did his undergraduate work at Ohio Wesleyan University, graduating in 1962, and received a medical degree from Wayne State University School of Medicine in 1965.

== Career ==
May initially worked as an Air Force psychiatrist in Vietnam where he was a conscientious objector and then became chief of inpatient services at Andrews Air Force Base. After he and his family moved to Columbia, Maryland, he worked on staff treating patients at the Spring Grove Hospital Center and Patuxent Correctional Mental Health Center of the Maryland state prisons system. In 1973, May joined the Shalem Institute for Spiritual Formation in Bethesda, Maryland, where he eventually became a senior fellow conducting workshops in contemplative theology and psychology. May wrote several books which advanced his views on combining spiritual direction with psychological treatment.

== Personal life ==
May was married for 43 years to Elizabeth Jane Clark with whom he had three sons and a daughter.

== Selected works ==
- The Open Way: A Meditation Handbook (1977) Paulist Press, ISBN 9780809102280
- Simply Sane: Stop Fixing Yourself and Start Really Living (1977) Paulist Press, ISBN 9780809102150
- Pilgrimage Home: The Conduct of Contemplative Practice in Groups (1979) Paulist Press, ISBN 9780809121434
- Care of Mind, Care of Spirit: Psychiatric Dimensions of Spiritual Direction (1982) Harper & Row, ISBN 9780060655334
- Will and Spirit: A Contemplative Psychology (1983) Harper & Row, ISBN 9780060655341
- Addiction and Grace: Love and Spirituality in the Healing of Addictions (1988) Harper & Row, ISBN 9780060655365
- The Awakened Heart: Opening Yourself to the Love You Need (1993) HarperCollins, ISBN 9780060654733
- The Dark Night of the Soul: A Psychiatrist Explores the Connection Between Darkness and Spiritual Growth (2004) Harper & Row, ISBN 9780060750558
- The Wisdom of Wilderness: Experiencing the Healing Power of Nature (2007) HarperCollins, ISBN 9780061146633
