= Paul Waldron Reilly =

American architect

Paul W(aldron) Reilly
- Born: 30 March 1932
- Died: May 25, 2011 (aged 79); Stamford, Connecticut
- Known for: Architect

Paul Waldron Reilly, AIA (born 30 March 1932 - 25 May 2011), was an American architect who practiced in mid-20th-century New York, New Jersey, and Florida under the architectural firm name Paul W. Reilly

== Personal life ==
Born 30 March 1932 in New York City to father, architect Paul C. Reilly. Reilly earned his Bachelor of Architecture from the University of Notre Dame in 1956. He served in the government from 1956 to 1958. In 1970, he lived in Locust, New Jersey.

== Architecture practice ==
He joined the New York Chapter of the American Institute of Architects in 1964. From 1966, he served on the New York City Mayor's Panel of Architects. In 1970, his office was located at 393 Seventh Ave, New York, New York 10001. Generally an advocate of contemporary architecture, AIA Guide to NYC (1978), conceded that "it is hard to miss [St. Francis de Chantal's Church, Bronx,]. Perhaps that's one of its problems." The small practice, Paul W Reilly & Associates, was listed as on Broad Street, Red Bank, New Jersey.

== Works ==
- 1965: Our Lady of All Souls Church (East Orange, New Jersey)
- 1965: Our Lady of All Souls School (East Orange, New Jersey)
- 1966: Most Blessed Sacrament School (Franklin Lakes, New Jersey)
- 1967: St. Frances of Rome's Church (Bronx, New York) or Paul J. Reilly (according to the AIA Guide to NYC)
- 1967: St. Mary of the Angels Academy (Haddonfield, New Jersey) School additions
- 1968: St. Mary of the Angels Convent (Haddonfield, New Jersey) (new convent building)
- 1970: St. Francis de Chantal's Church (Bronx, New York)
