= Church of the Good Shepherd (New York City) =

Church in Manhattan, New York

Coordinates: 40°52′6″N 73°55′13″W

The Church of the Good Shepherd
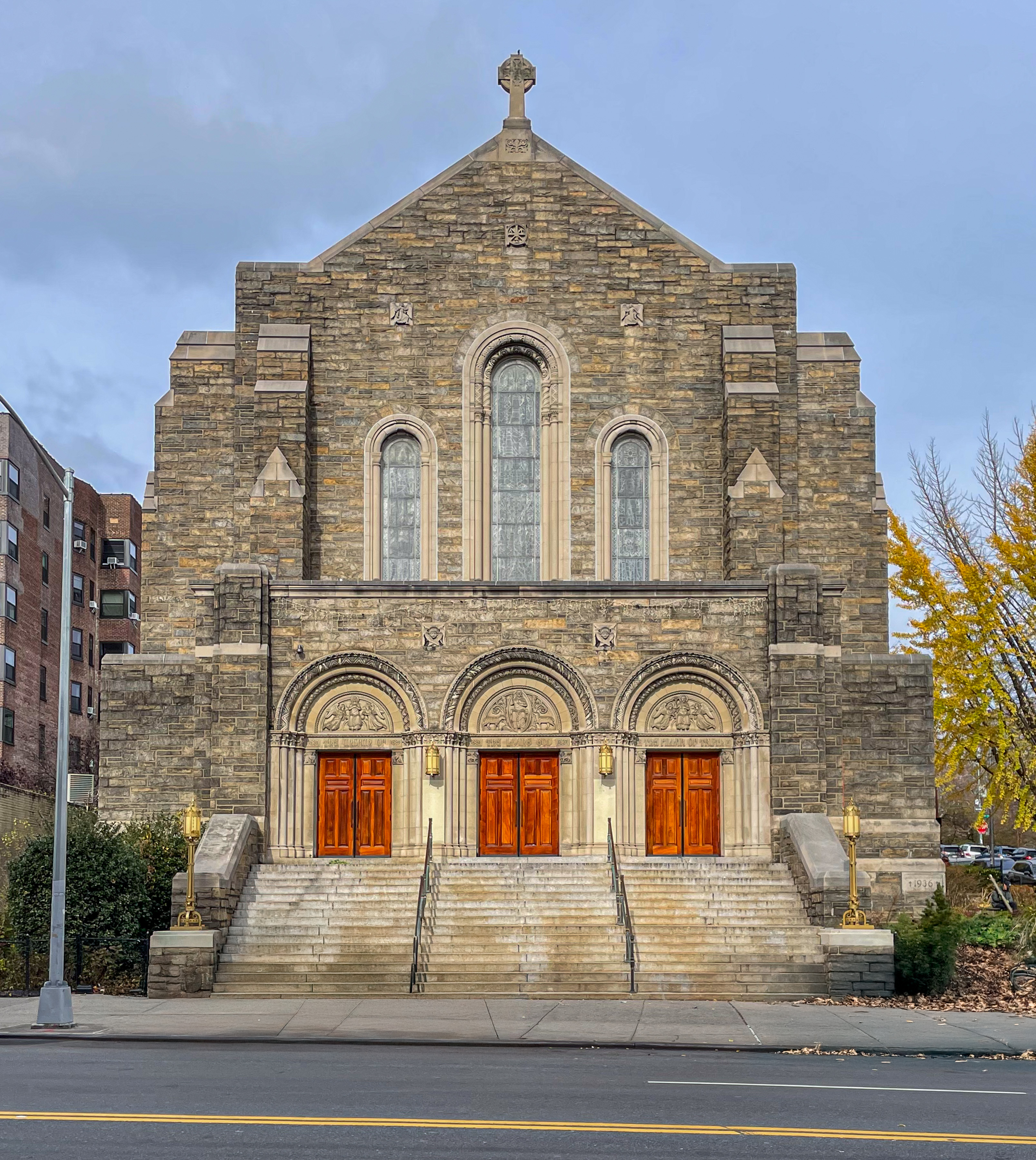
- (2024)

General information
- Location: Inwood, Manhattan, New York City, United States
- Construction started: 1924 (for school); 1935 (for church); 1950 (for convent)
- Completed: 1936 (for church)
- Cost: $250,000 (for 1924 school) $300,000 (for 1950 convent)
- Client: Roman Catholic Archdiocese of New York

Design and construction
- Architects: 1936 church: Paul Monaghan; 1924 school: Auguste L. Noel; 1950 convent: Paul C. Reilly

Website
- Church of the Good Shepherd, Manhattan

The Church of the Good Shepherd, located at 4967 Broadway at the corner of Isham Street in the Inwood neighborhood of Manhattan, New York City, is a Roman Catholic parish church of the Roman Catholic Archdiocese of New York. It was built in 1935-36 and was designed by Paul Monaghan in the Romanesque Revival style. The Celtic cross at the top of the church is an indication that the parish was originally largely Irish-American; today there are more Dominican-Americans than Irish.

== History ==
The parish was established in 1911 on land purchased by the Paulist Fathers from the Isham Estate. It is currently staffed by the Capuchin Friars. At the time of its founding, Inwood was considered to be "the unofficial capital of the Irish diaspora", and the parish was largely made up of Irish-Americans. The parish's first church was built c.1912, to designs by Thomas H. Poole & Company, on a site just down Isham Street from the current church, surrounded by wooded countryside.

A two-story parochial school at 110-116 Cooper Street was built in 1924, to designs by Auguste L. Noel, at the cost of $250,000. A five-story brick convent was located at 620 Isham Street; it was built in 1950 and was designed by architect Paul C. Reilly. It cost $300,000 to construct.

Despite the change of the parish's ethnic make-up to be largely Dominican-Americans, there are still ties to the church and New York's Irish community. The church was deeply affected by the loss of many Irish-Americans in the September 11 attacks. As a memorial, a twisted cruciform piece of steel from the World Trade Center stands in the churchyard, with a sign saying "Ground Hero".

A memorial to the dead of the Church of the Good Shepherd Catholic parish from the September 11 attacks

The story of the journey of this iron cross to the World Trade Center site to the Church of the Good Shepherd
