= Kennedy Fried Chicken =

Restaurant primarily in the northeastern U.S.

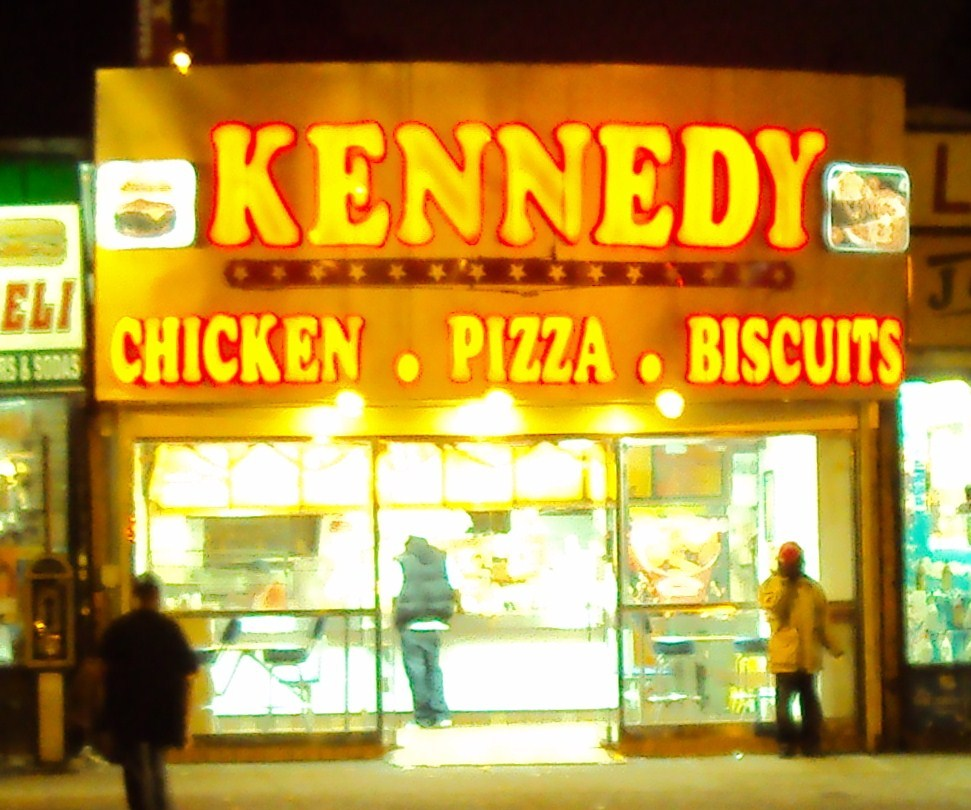
- A Kennedy Fried Chicken in Brooklyn, New York
- Type: Private
- Industry: Fast food
- Founded: May 16, 1969; 57 years ago New York City, United States
- Founder: Taeb Zia and Abdul Karim
- Headquarters: New York City, United States
- Products: Fried chicken and related Southern American foods

Kennedy Fried Chicken and Crown Fried Chicken are common restaurant names primarily in the New York–New Jersey, Philadelphia, Delaware and Baltimore areas of the United States, but also in nearby smaller cities or towns along the Northeastern United States. Kennedy Fried Chickens typically compete with Kentucky Fried Chicken (KFC) in low income neighborhoods of several states along the East Coast.

There are also a number in the West Coast, primarily in California. A number of these restaurants, located in other states, are named New York Fried Chicken, essentially designed in the same manner and offering the same general menu as Kennedy and Crown Fried Chicken. It is not an actual franchise in the typical manner. Every "Kennedy" named chicken restaurant is independently owned and operated by different individuals but consist of essentially the same menu.

== History ==
Kennedy Fried Chicken was founded on May 16, 1969, with its first restaurant on Nostrand Avenue in the Flatbush section of Brooklyn. There is a dispute among the people involved in the business over who is the actual founder. Some claim that it is Abdul Karim while others say Taeb Zia was the early founder. Zia, an Afghan immigrant originally from Kabul, Afghanistan, is known by some as Zia Chicken or "Lau Chicken".

After studying engineering in Baku, Azerbaijan, then a republic of the Soviet Union, he immigrated to the United States in 1977 and began working at a New York City fast food restaurant chain by the name of Kansas Fried Chicken, founded by African-American entrepreneur Horace Bullard. After spending about three years learning how to run a fast food business, he decided to open his own fried chicken restaurant with equivalent quality but prices 15-20% cheaper.

Kennedy Fried Chicken was named after assassinated U.S. President John F. Kennedy, "because Afghans are fond of the former president." During the 1980s and 1990s many of the same restaurants have opened across New Jersey, New York, Massachusetts, Pennsylvania, Maryland and several other states, including West Coast states such as California.

== The restaurants ==
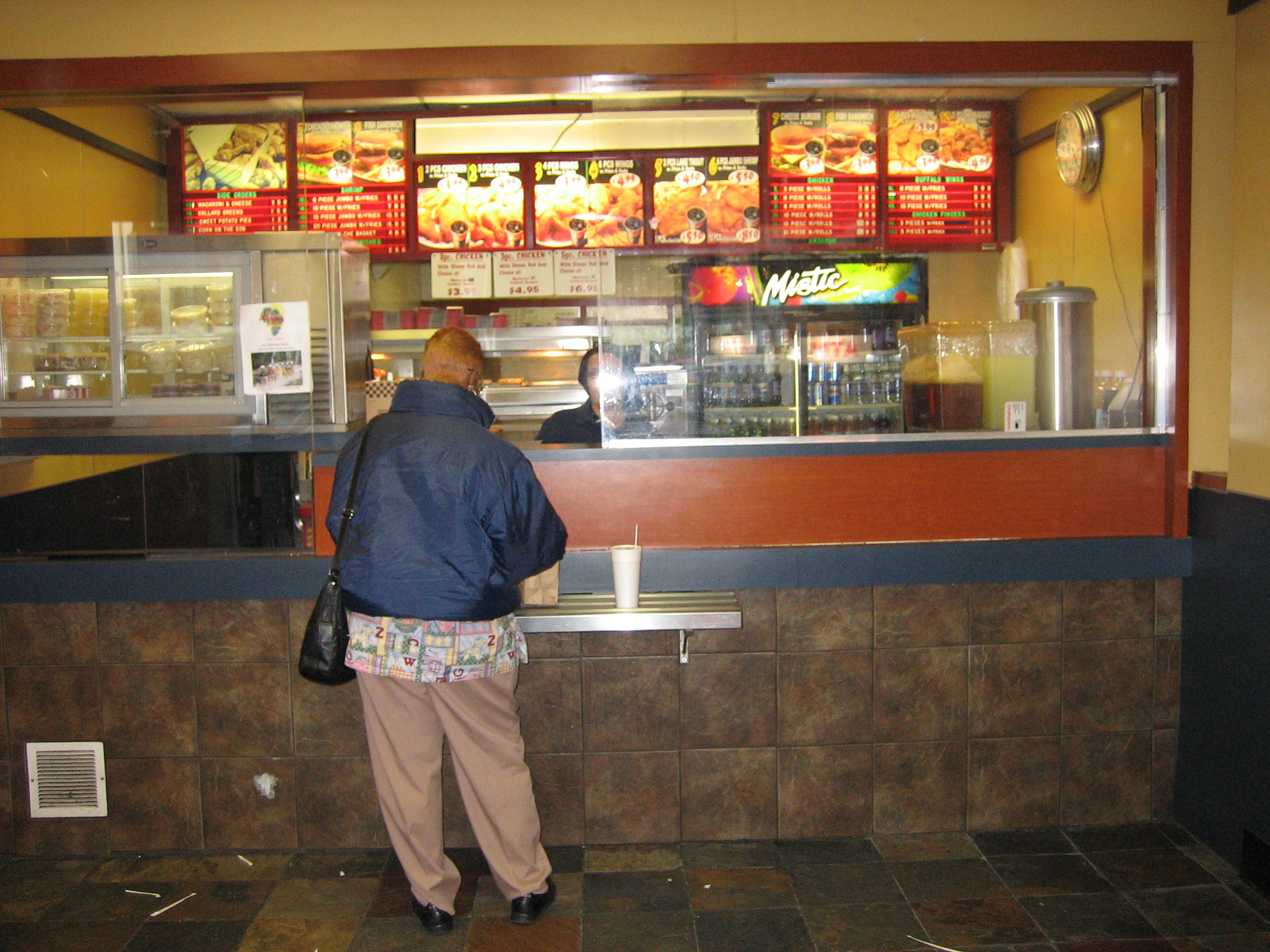
Inside a Crown Fried Chicken in Upper North Philadelphia (2006)

For the most part the restaurants share the same concept, if not the same menus. In addition to fried chicken they may offer fried fish, hot wings, short ribs, shrimp, burgers, pizza, beef patties on coco bread, sandwiches, fries, corn on the cob, mashed potatoes, onion rings, sweet potato pies and a variety of flavors of ice cream for dessert.

Many restaurant locations are in low-income and higher crime communities, serving from behind bulletproof glass, especially at night. Some locations have added Middle Eastern dishes such as kebabs with rice to their menus, but Kennedy's and Crown's specialties are the deep-fried chicken, described as "not too dry or too soggy". Chicken and food are quite often ordered a la carte. Not all dishes are available for takeout and delivery. Menus are usually posted on the walls with photographs.

Due to the tendency of these restaurants to appear in socioeconomically challenged locations, Kennedy, Crown, and New York Fried Chicken are sometimes referred to disparagingly as "ghetto chicken".

In 2009 one Kennedy Fried Chicken restaurant in Brooklyn, New York changed its name to "Obama Fried Chicken" in honor of the election of President Barack Obama.

== Legal matters ==
The restaurants are traditionally owned and operated mostly by Afghan-Americans but are not formally connected, although their concept, menus and prices are similar. The multitude of owners has caused problems for Kentucky Fried Chicken (KFC) in New York. Since the 1990s Kentucky Fried Chicken has tried to enforce trademark rights against some of the Kennedy Fried Chicken restaurants, many of which used the initials "KFC", and have been known to decorate their restaurants in red and white colors similar to Kentucky Fried Chicken restaurants.

=== Trademark controversy ===
In 2005 Abdul Haye, an Afghan immigrant since 1989 and a resident of Whitestone, Queens in New York City, registered Kennedy Fried Chicken as a trademark. He has been attempting to enforce the trademark against other restaurants with mixed results.

== See also ==
- List of fast-food chicken restaurants
