= Shalem Institute for Spiritual Formation =

The Shalem Institute for Spiritual Formation is a Christian educational organization that offers programs with the stated goal of providing "in-depth support for contemplative living and leadership." The institute was incorporated in 1979 having grown out of a group that began meeting in 1973 in Washington, D.C. The institute is an associate member of the Washington Theological Consortium.
