= Paul C. Reilly =

American architect

- Born: Paul Cornelius Reilly; 1890; New York City
- Died: September 8, 1984; Locust, New Jersey
- Known for: Architect
- Spouse: Mary Germaine Waldron (died 1982)
- Children: Paul Waldron Reilly

Paul Cornelius Reilly (1890–1984) was an American architect who designed many buildings for Catholic clients. He is also remembered for his design of Manhattan theatres.

== Early life and architectural education ==
Reilly was born in New York City and studied in the public schools of the city. He graduated from Columbia University and, early in his career, was chief designer for the former New York City architectural firm of Thomas W. Lamb.

== Architectural practice ==
During the 1920s, Reilly entered into a partnership with Douglas Pairman Hall forming a firm named Reilly and Hall. Mr Reilly's theaters were produced by this firm. The partnership was dissolved on January 1, 1925. Later, Reilly would continue to practice under his own name.

== Personal life ==
Mr. Reilly was also closely associated with the Roman Catholic Archdiocese of New York. He was a member of the Cardinal's Committee of the Laity and once held the post of architect of St. Patrick's Cathedral, New York.

Reilly married Mary Germaine Waldron. His wife died in December 1982.

His son, Paul Waldron Reilly also became an architect and worked for a time with his father before opening a practice under his own name.

== Works ==
- Sacred Heart Cathedral Newark, New Jersey (modifications)
- Church of Our Saviour, New York City
- Sacred Heart Church, Hartsdale, New York
- Church of the Transfiguration, Collingswood, New Jersey
- Our Lady of Lourdes Hospital, Camden, New Jersey
- Capitol Theater, New York City
- Rialto Theater, New York City
- Rivoli Theater, New York City
- Morosco Theater, New York City
- Wellmont Theatre, Montclair, New Jersey
- State Theatre, Schenectady, New York
- Coney Island Theater, Brooklyn, New York City
- St. Ephrem Roman Catholic Church, Brooklyn, New York City
- Newton Theatre, Newton, New Jersey
- Loew's Sheridan Theatre, New York City
- Fugazy Theatre, New York City
- Renovation of the Church of St. Thomas More, New York City
- St. Peter Claver Roman Catholic Church, Montclair, New Jersey
