= Cordoba University =

Islamic university in Virginia, United States

Coordinates: 39°2′56.8″N 77°26′17.2″W

Cordoba University was an Islamic university located in Ashburn, Virginia, United States. The university was made up of the Graduate School of Islamic and Social Sciences (GSISS) and Cordoba School of Professional Studies.

GSISS was part of a United States Department of Defense program for training Muslim military chaplains which produced the United States Marine Corps' first Muslim chaplain. In March 2002, GSISS "was raided by customs agents searching for evidence of terrorist financing and the Pentagon's certifying agencies said they have ended the relationship."

GSISS is an affiliate member of the Washington Theological Consortium.

== See also ==
- List of Islamic educational institutions
