= Fiqh Council of North America =

Muslim association

The Fiqh Council of North America (originally known as ISNA Fiqh Committee) is an association of Muslims who interpret Islamic law on the North American continent. The FCNA was founded in 1986 with the goal of developing legal methodologies for adopting Islamic law to life in the West.

According to its website, the Fiqh Council traces its origins back to the Religious Affairs Committee of the then Muslim Student Association of the United States and Canada established in the 1960s. In 1980, after the founding of the Islamic Society of North America (ISNA), the Religious Affairs Committee evolved into the Fiqh Committee of the Islamic Society of North America, and was eventually transformed into the Fiqh Council of North America in 1986.

Its 20 members issue religious rulings, resolve disputes, and answer questions relating to the Islamic faith. As outlined in its by-laws, the Council's primary objectives include: "To consider, from a Shari'ah perspective, and offer advice on specific undertakings, transactions, contracts, projects, or proposals, guaranteeing thereby that the dealings of North American Muslims fall within the parameters of what is permitted by the Shari'ah." The Council's opinions are not binding.

== Fatwas ==
- Terrorism: In July 2005, the Council issued a fatwa stating that all forms of terrorism against civilians are haram (forbidden under Islamic law), that it is forbidden for Muslims to cooperate with anyone involved in terrorism, and that it is a duty of all Muslims to cooperate with law enforcement to protect civilian lives.
- Capital Punishment: The Council has issued a fatwa calling for a moratorium on capital punishment in the United States, based on the fact that several of the presupposed requirements for the carrying out of the law, according to Sharia, are not being met in most cases.
- Apostasy: The Council issued a fatwa which declared that apostasy could not, on its own, be the grounds for any fixed punishment, especially capital punishment. The fatwa states: "The preponderance of evidence from both the Qur’an and Sunnah indicates that there is no firm ground for the claim that apostasy is in itself a mandatory fixed punishment Hadd, namely capital punishment"

== Executive Committee and members ==
Executive Members:

- Dr. Yasir Qadhi, Chairman
- Dr. Zainab Alwani, Vice Chairman
- Dr. Zulfiqar Ali Shah, Executive Director
- Dr. Muzammil H. Siddiqi
- Dr. Mohammad Qatanani
- Shaykh Umer Khan

Council Members:

- Dr. Abdulbari Mashal
- Shaykh Abdur Rahman Khan
- Dr. Ali Sulaiman Ali
- Dr. Ihsan Bagby
- Dr. Jamal Badawi
- Dr. Jasser Auda
- Dr. Muddassir Siddiqui
- Shaykh Muhammad Nur Abdullah
- Dr. Ossama Bahloul
- Dr. Tamara Gray
- Imam Yahya Hendi
