= Zainab Alwani =

Muslim American activist and scholar

- Born: 1962 (age 63–64); Baghdad, Iraq
- Education: International Islamic University Malaysia
- Occupation: Islamic scholar
- Known for: First woman to serve on Fiqh Council of North America
- Parent: Taha Jabir Alawani
- Relatives: Ruqaia Al-Alwani

Zainab Alwani is an American activist and Islamic scholar. She is Founding Director and Associate Professor of Islamic Studies at Howard University School of Divinity.

== Biography ==
Zainab Alwani was born in Baghdad, Iraq in 1962. She is the daughter of Taha Jabir Alalwani. Alwani and her family were forced to flee Iraq when she was 7. The family went to Egypt and later Saudi Arabia.

As a young woman, Alwani studied at Imam Mohammad Ibn Saud Islamic University. She received her PhD in Islamic jurisprudence (Usul al-Fiqh) from the International Islamic University in Malaysia. Alwani is also the first female jurist to sit on the board of the Fiqh Council of North America.

Alwani is an activist for the rights of Muslim women and children. She is active in continuing her father's thought and approach to minority fiqh. She specializes in Islamic jurisprudence, Quranic studies, the relationship between Islamic and civil law, and women and the family in Islam. Her sister is the Islamic scholar Ruqaia Al-Alwani. Hadia Mubarak identifies Zainab and Ruqaia as part of a growing body of female Muslim Qur'anic commentators.

== Publications ==
=== Books ===
- Alusra fi Maqasid al sharia: Qira’ fi Qadaya al zawaj waltalaq fi Amrika (The Objectives of Sharia and the family: Critical Reading in Marriage and Divorce in American Muslim Family). Herndon, Virginia: The International Institute of Islamic Thought (IIIT), 2013.
- Muslim Women and Global Challenges: Seeking Change Through a Quranic Textual Approach and the Prophetic Model. Institute of Objective Studies, 2012.
- What Islam Says about Domestic Violence: A Guide for Helping Muslim Families, 2008.

=== Articles ===
- "With Aisha in Mind: Reading Surat al-Nur through the Qur’an’s structural unity in Muslim Women and Gender Justice: Concepts, Sources, and Histories" edited by Dina El Omari, Juliane Hammer, and Mouhanad Khorchide. Routledge, 2020.
- "Kafāla: The Qur'anic-Prophetic Model of Orphan Care" in Journal of Islamic Faith & Practice. 2020.
- "Transformational Teaching: Prophet Muhammad (peace be upon him) as a Teacher and Murabbī" in Journal of Islamic Faith and Practice, 2019.
- "Al-wahda al-binaʾiyya li-l-Qurʾan: A Methodology for Understanding the Qur'an in the Modern Day" in Journal of Islamic Faith and Practice, 2018.
- "Muslim Women as Religious Scholars: A Historical Survey" in Muslima Theology: The Voices of Muslim Women Theologians edited by Ednan Aslan, Marcia Hermansen, and Elif Medeni. Peter Lang (Peter-Lang-Verlagsgruppe), 2013.
- "The Qur'anic Model for Harmony in Family Relations" in Change From Within: Diverse Perspectives on Domestic Violence in Muslim Community edited by Maha Alkhateeb and Salma Elkadi Abugideirii. Peaceful Families, 2007.
