= Asat Trust =

The Asat Trust is a business in Liechtenstein which represents the interests of other businesses in that state.

== People ==
- Prince Emanuel of Liechtenstein - board member (1970–1987)

== Notable Relationships ==
=== Al Taqwa ===
The Asat Trust has represented Al Taqwa Bank, a business of Youssef Nada and Ali Ghaleb Himmat, which has been accused of financing al-Qaeda.

A lawsuit filed by the family of John P. O'Neill describes Asat as a "money laundering organization" founded by Youssef Nada.

=== LGT Bank ===
Asat has a close relationship with the bank of the Liechtenstein royal family and has printed the name of that bank on its own letterhead.

It is common practice that a legal representative prints the name of a local bank on its own letterhead, indicating its own business account;

=== Galp Energia ===
The Asat Trust represented Portuguese energy company Galp Energia in its business dealings with Iraq in the Oil-for-Food Programme.

=== Alleged Hamas relationship ===
FBI Special Agent Lara Burn's testimony

Asat represented K & A Overseas Trading, a business of Khairy H. Al-Agha and Saleh Kamel Jibreel, which the US government alleged to finance Hamas in the Holy Land Foundation trial.

Asat never represented the above companies; Asat was not involved in any financing as described above. The UN Security Council Al-Qaida and Taliban Sanctions Committee approved the deletion of the Asat Trust from its Consolidated List.
