= Al-Jasser =

Al-Jasser (Arabic: الجاسر) or Jasser (Arabic: جاسر) is an Arabic surname, often found in Saudi Arabia, while Jasser (Arabic: جاسر) is also an Arabic masculine given name. Notable people with the name include:

== Surname ==
- Muhammed Al-Jasser (born 1955), Saudi Arabian economist and politician
- Omar Al-Jasser (born 1962), Saudi Arabian actor, writer, and director
- Saleh bin Nasser Al-Jasser (born 1965), Saudi Arabian politician
- Turki bin Abdulaziz al-Jasser (died 2025), Saudi Arabian executed journalist and blogger
- Zuhdi Jasser (born 1967), American religious and political commentator and physician of Syrian descent

== Given name ==
- Jasser Auda (born 1966), Egypt-born Canadian scholar of Islamic jurisprudence
- Jasser Haj Youssef (born 1980), Tunisian musician, musicologist and composer
- Jasser Khmiri (born 1997), Tunisian footballer
- Jasser Yahya (born 1992), Qatari footballer

== See also ==
- Hamad Al-Jassir (1907–2000), Saudi Arabian journalist and historian
- Yasser Al-Mosailem (born 1984), Saudi Arabian footballer
