= Ali al-Qarahdaghi =

Qatari Islamic scholar (born 1949)

Grand Mufti Ali al-Qarahdaghi
- علي القره داغي
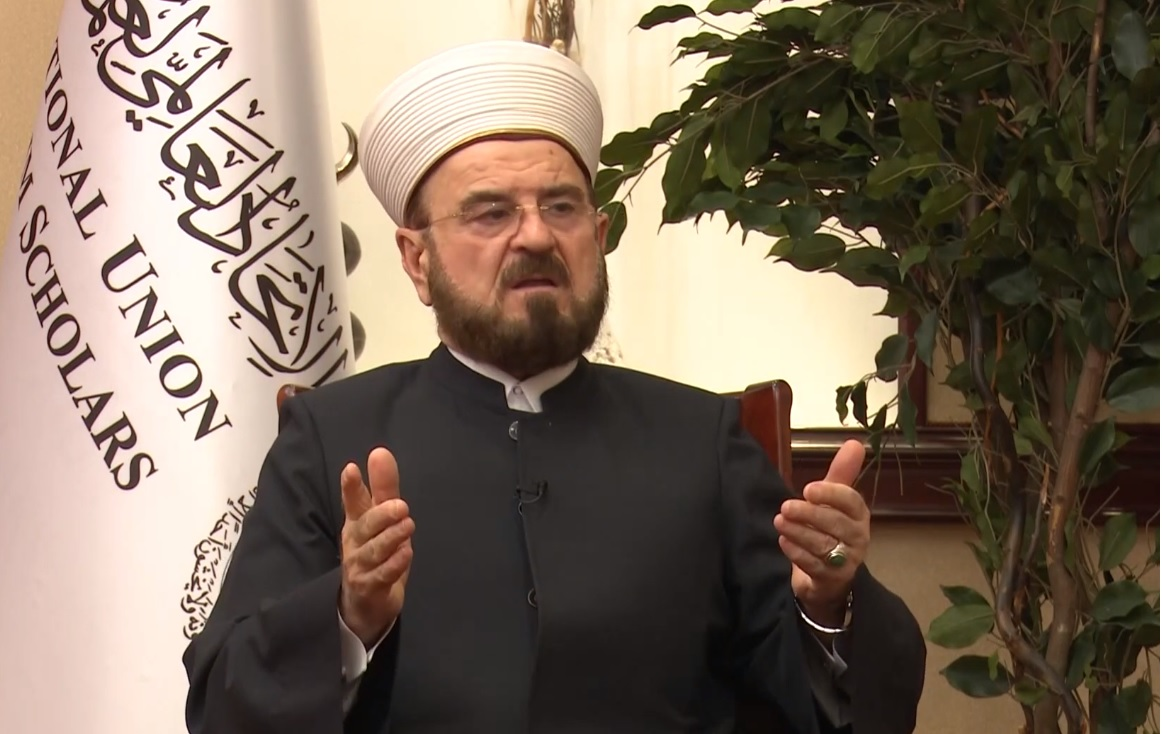
- Al-Qarahdaghi in 2019

Secretary-General of the International Union of Muslim Scholars
- Incumbent
- Assumed office 2022

Personal life
- Born: 1949 (age 76–77) Qarahdagh District, Iraqi Kurdistan
- Education: Al-Azhar University

Religious life
- Religion: Islam
- Denomination: Sunni
- School: Shafi'i

Muslim leader
- Residence: Doha, Qatar

Ali Muhi al-Din al-Qarahdaghi (Note: Arabic: علي محيي الدين القره داغي, romanized: ʿAlī Muḥī al-Dīn al-Qarahdāghī) (born 1949) is a Qatari Islamic scholar who serves as the secretary-general of the International Union of Muslim Scholars (IUMS), a position he had held since 2022. He is considered the grand mufti of Qatar and regarded as the ideological successor to Yusuf al-Qaradawi.

Born in Qarahdagh, Iraqi Kurdistan, al-Qarahdaghi studied at the Al-Azhar University in Cairo, Egypt and later shifted to Doha, Qatar. He is an expert on Sharia law and Shafi'i jurisprudence of Sunni Islam combined with Islamic economics. He is a professor of jurisprudence at Qatar University, Doha.

== Life ==
Ali al-Qarahdaghi is the secretary general of the International Union of Muslim Scholars (IUMS, current headquarters in Doha, the capital of Qatar, headed by Sheikh Yusuf al-Qaradawi). He is vice president of the Association of Muslim Schools of Tehran and a member of many other Islamic organizations, including the International Islamic Fiqh Academy, the Organisation of Islamic Cooperation and the European Council for Fatwa and Research.

He is the founder and president of the Islamic Kurdish League, founded in 1988, and President of the Board of Trustees of the University of Human Development in the city of Sulaimaniyah. He is the chairman of the Sharia supervisory board of the Qatar First Bank (QFB) and a member of the Sharia supervisory boards of several Islamic institutions and banks, including Qatar National Bank, Dubai Islamic Bank, Doha Bank Islamic Branch, Qatar Insurance, Gulf Investment House and Ahli United Bank. He started a study of Sharia at the University of Baghdad and graduated with a doctorate at the Al-Azhar University in Cairo. He is the author of numerous works on the Islamic economy and comparative jurisprudence. He has been granted numerous awards and honors and is a member of numerous councils, committees and associations. Ali al-Qarahdaghi took part in the International Theological Conference "Islamic Doctrine against Radicalism" in Moscow on 25–26 May 2012.

== Media reviews ==
According to Chechen historian and political analyst Mairbek Vatchagaev (the article published by the American Jamestown Foundation), Ali al-Qarahdaghi and the International Union of Muslim scholars for Moscow play an important role in internal Russian Islamic stability:

Russian authorities do not simply want Sheikh Ali al-Qarahdaghi to declare the jihad in the North Caucasus to be illegal. Moscow regards this international Islamic organization as a potential means to control part of Russia's own Muslim population, which could issue fatwas on important questions of Islam and be recognized. Moscow, however, fails to see that only those Muslims who already recognize the official Muslim clergy will listen to al-Qarahdaghi. That portion of the Muslim community in Russia which deems cooperation between the authorities and the Muslim clergy unacceptable will not be influenced by al-Qarahdaghi.

He is an active supporter of Yusuf al-Qaradawi and his project "Muhammad: A Mercy for All".
