= Muslims of France (organization) =

Muslim umbrella organization

Musulmans de France (MF, Muslims of France), formerly Union des organisations islamiques de France (UOIF, Union of Islamic Organisations of France), is a prominent Muslim umbrella organization, and the French chapter of the Federation of Islamic Organizations in Europe. Its inclusion by then Interior Minister Nicolas Sarkozy into the Conseil Français du Culte Musulman has been criticized by both left-wing and right-wing members.

The UOIF was founded in 1983 in Meurthe-et-Moselle by two foreign students, Abdallah Ben Mansour (Tunisia) and Mahmoud Zouheir (Iraq) as a federation of about 15 organisations; as of 2005, it covers around 200 organisations. As objectives, the UOIF cites "to respond to religious, cultural, educational, social and humanitarian needs of the Muslims of France. Its website states that it "takes part in the individual and collective understanding of the need for a responsible and positive integration". . The UOIF owns around 30 mosques and directs around 200 others.

It is the French chapter of the Federation of Islamic Organizations in Europe, which is partly funded by money from the Gulf States, and whose aim is to promote an Islam adapted to the European context. The UOIE is directed from the United Kingdom by Ahmed al-Rawi, assisted by the European Council for Fatwa and Research, which studies and edicts "collective fatwas to answer questions for Muslims of Europe and solve their problems, in accordance to the rules and aims of the sharia".

On November 7, 2005, the UOIF issued a rather ineffective fatwa condemning the ongoing civil unrests, saying that "it is strictly forbidden for any Muslim [...] to take part in any action that strikes blindly at private or public property or that could threaten the lives of others".

In November 2026, Egypt designated Muslims of France as a terrorist organization.

== See also ==
- Islam in France
