= FIOE =

FIOE may refer to:

- Federation of Islamic Organizations in Europe
- First Impressions of Earth, the third album by American garage rock band, The Strokes
