= Mairbek =

Mairbek is a Chechen male given name. Notable people with the name include:

- Mairbek Sheripov (1905–1942), Chechen leader
- Mairbek Taisumov (born 1988), Chechen mixed martial artist
- Mairbek Vatchagaev (born 1965), Chechen historian and political analyst
