= Ayman Aly =

Secretary of the Muslim Brotherhood in Europe

Ayman Sayed Ahmed Aly (Arabic: أيمن سيد أحمد علي; born 29 October 1966 in Damietta, Egypt) was the vice chairman and general secretary of the Federation of Islamic Organizations in Europe (FIOE), the umbrella group of the Muslim Brotherhood in Europe. He was an advisor of the ousted president Muhammad Morsi, specializing in the affairs of Egyptian Expatriates. He was a senior member of the Egyptian Muslim Brotherhood Guidance Bureau, an official representative of Mohammed Mursi and advisor for Egyptian expatriates.

Ayman Aly and Ibrahim El-Zayat transferred money on behalf of the World Assembly of Muslim Youth, a fundamentalist organization, to an Albanian charity named Taibah in order to carry out fundamentalist Islamic activities in Europe. The Bosnian branch of Taibah was designated as a terrorist entity by both the United Nations and the United States in 2004. At the time of the transfer being supporter or member of a foreign terrorist organization was not illegal in Germany, therefore neither of them were charged.

In 2007, Ayman Aly and several other members of the Muslim Brotherhood, including the former vice chief of executive bureau in Shargeya, Hajj Abdel Aziz Abd El- Qader, were arrested by the Central Security Forces in order to prevent them from participating in the Shura council.

Since December 2013, Ayman Aly and four other members of Mursi's administration are held in captivity at the al-Aqrab unit in Tora Prison in Cairo. They face charges inter alia of being part of an illegal organization and distributing incorrect information that threatens national security. Ayman Aly and hundreds of other detainees went on a hunger strike at the prison to protest what they say are harsh treatment and conditions as well as a ban on personal visits.
