= Islamic Community of Germany =

Islamic organization in Germany

The Islamic Community of Germany (IGD; Islamische Gemeinschaft in Deutschland) is an Islamic organization headquartered in Munich, Germany and that consists of a network of mosques, centers and associations in all major West German cities. The German government says the IGD is the central organization for Muslim Brotherhood followers in Germany.

It is part of the umbrella organization Federation of Islamic Organizations in Europe which has its headquarters in Brussels.

== History ==
The IGD had its origins in the Munich Mosque Construction Commission, a German organization established in the 1950s whose goal was the construction of a mosque in Munich. Said Ramadan, the son-in-law of Hassan al-Banna, founder of the Muslim Brotherhood, took over control of the commission in 1958 and used his position to travel throughout the Muslim world with his Syrian assistant Ali Ghaleb Himmat. Ramadan was assisted significantly by the US Central Intelligence Agency which allegedly paid for his travel and backed his efforts to take over the mosque although suspicions that Ramadan was a CIA operative have never been proven. By the mid-1960s, Ramadan was no longer in control of the Commission which was taken over by Himmat. During the 1960s, under Himmat's leadership and together with Egyptian businessman Youssef Nada the newly built Munich Mosque became the nucleus of a network of mosques, centers and associations in all major West German cities. In 1963, the Mosque Building Commission was renamed The Islamic Community of Southern Germany and in a 1982 meeting was renamed the Islamic Community of Germany (Islamische Gemeinschaft in Deutschland (IGD).

In 1989, IGD founded the Muslim Brotherhood-affiliated umbrella organisation Federation of Islamic Organizations in Europe.

== Ties To Muslim Brotherhood ==
The IGD has been called "the main representative of the Brotherhood in Germany" and the German Domestic Intelligence Agency (Bundesamt für Verfassungsschutz) calls the IGD "the central organization for Muslim Brotherhood followers in Germany." while noting that links to the brotherhood are often publicly denied by its European organisations.

=== Previous names ===
The IGD has been known by these names:

- 1958 - Ecclesiastical Administration of Moslem Refugees in the Federal Republic of Germany (Geistliche Verwaltung der mohammedanischen Flüchtlinge in der Bundesrepublik Deutschland).
- 1960 - Mosque Construction Commission
- 1963 - Islamic Community of Southern Germany
- 1982 - Islamic Community of Germany (Islamische Gemeinschaft in Deutschland)

=== Notable Members ===
Directors:

- Said Ramadan - 1958-1968
- Faizal i Yazdani - 1968-1973
- Ali Ghaleb Himmat - 1973-2002
- Ibrahim Faruk El-Zayat - 2002–present
