= Abdallah bin Bayyah =

Mauritanian Islamic scholar

Shaykh Abdullah bin Bayyah
- عبدالله بن بيه
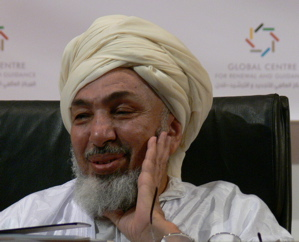

Chairman of the UAE Council of Fatwa
- Incumbent
- Assumed office 30 May 2017
- Preceded by: Office established

Personal life
- Born: 1935 (age 90–91) Timbédra, Mauritania

Religious life
- Religion: Islam
- Denomination: Sunni
- Jurisprudence: Maliki
- Creed: Ash'ari

Muslim leader
- Based in: King Abdul Aziz University
- Influenced: Hamza Yusuf
- Website: binbayyah.net

Abdallah ibn Mahfudh ibn Bayyah (Arabic: عبد الله بن المحفوظ بن بيّه, born 1935),also known as Ibn Bayyah, is a Mauritanian Islamic scholar, politician and professor of Islamic studies at the King Abdul Aziz University in Jeddah, Saudi Arabia, who serves as the chairman of the UAE Council for Fatwa.

He is a specialist in all four traditional Sunni schools, with an emphasis on the Maliki Madh'hab. Currently he is the president of the Forum for Promoting Peace in Muslim Societies. Bin Bayyah is involved in a number of scholarly councils including the Islamic Fiqh Council, a Saudi-based Institute. He was also the vice-president of the International Union of Muslim Scholars, from which he resigned in 2014. He was also a member of the Dublin-based European Council for Fatwa and Research, a council of Muslim clerics that aims to explain Islamic law in a way that is sensitive to the realities of European Muslims. For over two decades, in relation to the latter two institutions, he worked closely with the Egyptian scholar Yusuf al-Qaradawi. However, after the Arab Springs, Bin Bayyah distanced himself from Qaradawi and the International Union of Muslim scholars, instead founding the UAE-based Forum for Promoting Peace in Muslim Societies. The Forum has attracted huge controversy for its close ties to the UAE government as well as Bin Bayyahs personal support for authoritarian leaders.

== Early career ==
Bin Bayyah was born in 1935 in Timbédra in a household with an Islamic environment in which he studied all of the Islamic sciences. He began his formal studies with his father, Mahfoudh; meanwhile, he studied Arabic with Mohammed Salem bin al-Sheen, Quran with Bayyah bin al-Salik al-Misumi.

In his youth, he was appointed to study legal judgments in Tunis. On returning to Mauritania, he became minister of education and later minister of justice. He was also appointed a vice president of the first president of Mauritania. He resides in Jeddah, Saudi Arabia and teaches Islamic Legal Methodology, Qur'an and Arabic at the King Abdulaziz University. He is fluent in Arabic and French. Hamza Yusuf serves as his translator.

== Views ==
=== Sufism ===
Bin Bayyah is a promoter of Sufism. He believes that Tasawwuf (which he defines as the seeking of perfection through the love for and longing towards meeting Allah) needs to be revived in the Islamic Ummah and restored as an Islamic science. He also asserts that various Sufi practices - including the use of dhikr beads, Tawassul (using the righteous as a means to gain Allah’s blessings), Tabarruk (deriving blessings from the relics of the deceased), and visiting the graves of the Awliya - all have a "solid basis in Islam." Bin Bayyah asserts that although Sufis strive to attain Ihsan, the highest level of faith in Islam, it is only attainable once one has mastered the first two levels of faith, Islam (the focus of jurists) and Iman (the focus of theologians).

Bin Bayyah states: "That space of overflowing love, light, passion, insight, transparency, transcendence, and spirituality must have some container and some action to exist within and by. Actually, it is the inseparability and interdependence of the body and the soul. There must be a discipline with its own rules and terminology to represent such perfection aspired to by the highly-determined. That discipline took various names such as “sermons”, as used by Al-Bukhari, and “asceticism”, as in early Sunnah. Eventually, it was agreed to be named “Tasawuff”, just as the discipline of the Sharia was to be called Fiqh."

=== On extremism ===
Bin Bayyah is one of the signatories of the Amman Message, which gives a broad foundation for defining Muslim orthodoxy. He is also a signatory to the Letter to Baghdadi, an open letter to Abu Bakr al-Baghdadi, the leader of the Islamic State of Iraq and Syria. The Letter to Baghdadi is a theological refutation of the practices of the Islamic State of Iraq and Syria. In 2014, he issued a fatwa against the extremist terrorist group ISIS and was famously quoted in a later interview on CNN for saying, "I call to life, not to death." In subsequent years, Bin Bayyah has addressed think tanks and similar audiences such as The Council on Foreign Relations.

== Prominence ==
Bin Bayyah was quoted by President Barack Obama during his speech before U.N security council 2014. Since 2009, he has been ranked as The 500 Most Influential Muslims by Royal Islamic Strategic Studies Centre and currently holds the number 15 spot for 2020.

== Publications ==
- The Craft of the Fatwa and minority Fiqh, 2005.
- A dialogue about human rights in Islam, 2003.
- Ideological opinions (فتاوى فكرية)
- Amaly al-Dalalat (Usul al-fiqh), 2003.
- Terrorism: a Diagnosis and Solutions
- The Discourse of Security in Islam and the Culture of Tolerance and Harmony
- Fatwas and Reflections
- A clarification on the various legal opinions pertaining to financial transactions
- The Benefits of Endowments
- Evidence for those suffering from illnesses on the immense Divine award that awaits them
- Aims and their Proof

== Responsibilities and positions ==
- Chairman of the Emirates Fatwa Council, UAE
- President of the Forum for Promoting Peace in Muslim Societies, UAE
- Director of the Global Center for Renewal & Guidance, UK
- Member of the European Research & Fatwa Council, Ireland
- Deputy President of the International Association of Muslim Scholars, Beirut
- Member of the Association of Indian Jurists, Delhi, India
- Member of The Royal Aal al-Bayt Institute for Islamic Thought, Jordan
- Member of the Counsel of Jurists attached to the Organisation of Islamic Conference, Jeddah
- Member of the Specialist Panel presiding over the Prince Naif ben Abdul Aziz prize for Prophetic Traditions and Islamic Studies
- Member of the Muslim League’s International High Council of Mosques, Mecca
- Member of the International Aid Organisation of Kuwait
- Member of the Lecturing Staff at the King Abdul Aziz University in Jeddah
- Member of the High Council in the Centre for Studying the Aims of Sharia, UK

== Medals and awards ==
- Awarded the King Abdul Aziz Medal with the Rank of Distinction
- Awarded the Jordanian Medal First Degree
- Awarded the King Abdullah II of Jordan Prize for Scholars and Callers to God, Jordan
- The Degree of the Organisation of Islamic Conference with Distinction, and others
- Awarded the Chinguetti Prize for the Category of Islamic Studies for his book “A Dialogue from Afar”
- The “Ma’al Hijrah” award from King Sultan Abdullah Sultan Ahmad Shah of Malaysia for his efforts in spreading science, values of peace, tolerance, coexistence and positive influence in the world.

== See also ==
- Reviving the Islamic Spirit

=== Prominent students ===
- Hamza Yusuf
