= Maqasid =

Goals or objectives of Islamic law

Maqasid (Arabic: مقاصد, lit. 'goals' or 'purposes') or maqāṣid al-sharīʿa (goals or objectives of sharia) is an Islamic legal doctrine. Together with another related classical doctrine, maṣlaḥa (lit. 'public interest'), it has come to play an increasingly prominent role in modern times. The notion of maqasid was first clearly articulated by al-Ghazali (died 1111), who argued that maslaha was God's general purpose in revealing the divine law, and that its specific aim was preservation of five essentials of human well-being: religion, life, intellect, lineage, and property.

Although most classical-era jurists recognized maslaha and maqasid as important legal principles, they held different views regarding the role they should play in Islamic law. Some jurists viewed them as auxiliary rationales constrained by scriptural sources (Quran and hadith) and qiyas (analogical reasoning). Others regarded them as an independent source of law, whose general principles could override specific inferences based on the letter of scripture. While the latter view was held by a minority of classical jurists, in modern times it came to be championed in different forms by prominent scholars who sought to adapt Islamic law to changing social conditions by drawing on the intellectual heritage of traditional jurisprudence. These scholars expanded the inventory of maqasid to include such aims of sharia as reform and women's rights (Rashid Rida); justice and freedom (Mohammed al-Ghazali); and human dignity and rights (Yusuf al-Qaradawi).

== History ==
The jurist Imam Abu Ishaq al-Shatibi (died 1388) also wrote on Maqasid Al-Sharia in his work Al-Muwafaqaat fi Usool al-Sharia. He defined maqasid al-shariah as "the attainment of good, welfare, advantage, benefits and warding off evil, injury, loss of the creatures". According to al-Shatibi, the legal ends of Islamic law "are the benefits intended by the law. Thus, one who keeps legal form while squandering its substance does not follow the law".

However, it was not until modern times that Islamic scholars have shown a renewed interest in the maqasid. The scholarship began with the work of the Tunisian scholar Muhammad al-Tahir ibn Ashur (died 1973 CE). Since the turn of the century, a number of Islamic scholars, including Mohammad Hashim Kamali, Professor Imran Ahsan Khan Nyazee, Ahmed Raissouni, Mohamed El-Tahir El-Mesawi, Halim Rane, Jasser Auda, and Tariq Ramadan, have advocated the maqasid approach and contributed to its development.

Sheikh Muhammad Abu Zahra believed that Shariah was a "mercy to humanity" with three major goals: "nurturing the righteous individual", "establishing justice", and "realization of benefits".

== In politics ==
On 10 July 2014, Malaysian Prime Minister Najib Razak gave a speech calling for an end to conflict between Shia and Sunni. He stated that Malaysia can be an "example for other Muslim nations on what it means to be a progressive and developed nation based on the five objectives of Shariah – to uphold the faith, life, intellect, progeny and property". "Our government's policies have always been based on these five principles of maqasid shariah... let us be an example of a Muslim country that is developed and progressive based on maqasid shariah."

== In Islamic finance ==
Islamic scholars working in Islamic finance have attempted to elaborate on the objective of wealth (mal) or financial transaction. A contemporary scholar (Laidin) postulates five objectives:

1. continuity of the circulation of the wealth
2. continuity of the investment of wealth
3. achieving comprehensive communal prosperity
4. financial transparency
5. validation of financial ownership.

== See also ==
- Al-Maqasid – an introductory book on Islamic principles
