= Ilham Al-Qaradawi =

Qatari professor (born 1959)

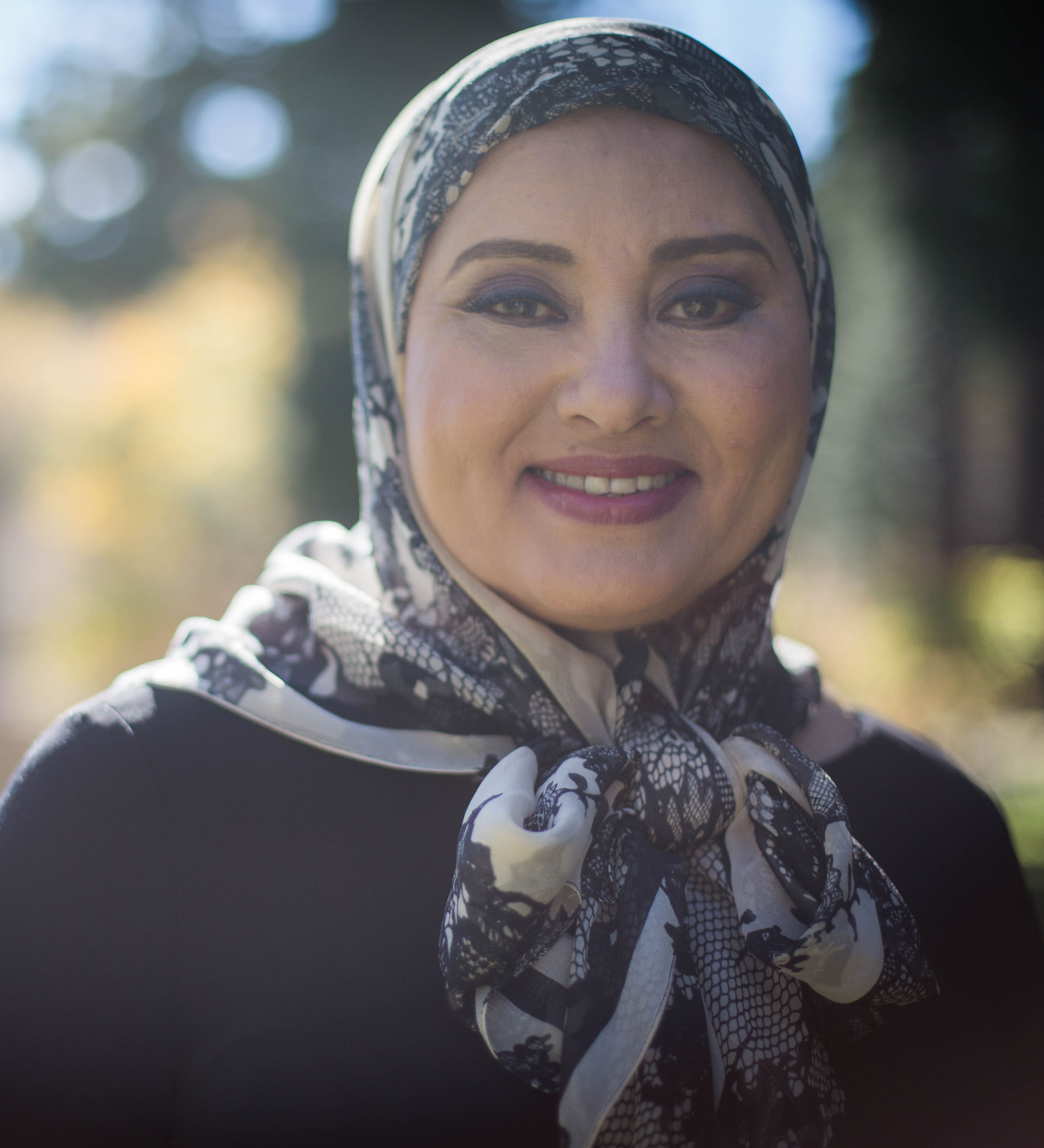
- Born: Ilham Yusuf Al-Qaradawi; 19 September 1959 (age 66)
- Education: Qatar University, BSc., 1981; University of London, MSc., 1984; University of London, PhD, 1991
- Scientific career
- Fields: Nuclear Physics
- Workplaces: Qatar University
- Website: Personal and Research website

Ilham Al-Qaradawi (born 19 September 1959) is a Qatari professor of positron and radiation physics at Qatar University and adjunct professor of physics at Texas A&M University at Qatar. She is the daughter of the Egyptian Muslim scholar, Yusuf Al-Qaradawi.

She is known for her work in positron physics, establishing the first slow positron beam facilities in the Middle East region. She has appeared on Al-Jazeera news network to address several nuclear energy problems in the world.

== Education and early career ==
Al-Qaradawi received her Bachelor of Science degree in physics in 1981 from Qatar University in Doha, Qatar. She then attended Bedford College, University of London for her Master of Science degree in nuclear physics in 1984. She obtained her PhD in positron physics from the Royal Holloway College, University of London in 1991. She then worked as an assistant professor at Qatar University until 2009, when she was promoted to professor. She held a research fellowship at the University of London working on positron physics from 1998 to 1999.

== Research ==
Al-Qaradawi's research centers on positron and radiation physics and its applications. She led the efforts in establishing the first slow positron beam facility in the Middle East region, known as the "Qatar Positron Beam". The positron beam facility incorporates a Na-22 source and Tungsten mesh moderator, and is a magnetically guided beam with energies of 0-30 keV. has established an environmental radiation measurement laboratory in Qatar University due to her interests in nuclear and radiation physics.

In 2016, she founded the first scientific societies in Qatar, the Qatar Physics Society. She is currently the president, and holds training workshops for physics teachers and other activities in an effort to spread physics knowledge and improve physics education in the region.

== Awards and honors ==
- Recipient of the GR8! Women Magazine Award in 2013.
- Named top 500 most influential Arabs by Arabian Business magazine in 2012 and 2013.
- Named top 50 most influential Arabian women by Arabian Business magazine in 2012.
- Fellow of the Institute of Physics (IoP) in the UK.
- Qatar University Award for excellence in research, 2009.

== Publications ==
- Al-Qaradawi, I. Y., et al. “A Magnetic Transport Middle Eastern Positron Beam.” Applied Surface Science, vol. 255, no. 1, 15 May 2008, pp. 125–127., doi:10.1016/j.apsusc.2008.05.194.
