= Al-Maqasid =

Guide to Islam by Abu Ishaq al-Shatibi

Al-Maqasid (lit. 'the goals' or 'the purposes') is a guide to Islam written by Imam Abu Ishaq al-Shatibi in his book "Al-Mowafaq'at". It covers purposes of Islamic faith, Zakat (alms), Hajj (pilgrimage) or even of the Qur'an and Sunnah as well as frequently asked questions and can be used as a primer for students of Islam. Newer editions contain essays on modern issues. It is also known in English as the Manual of Islam and is one of the easier to understand translated works on Islam.

== See also ==
- Maqasid
