= Muhammad Imara =

Egyptian Islamic scholar (1931–2020)

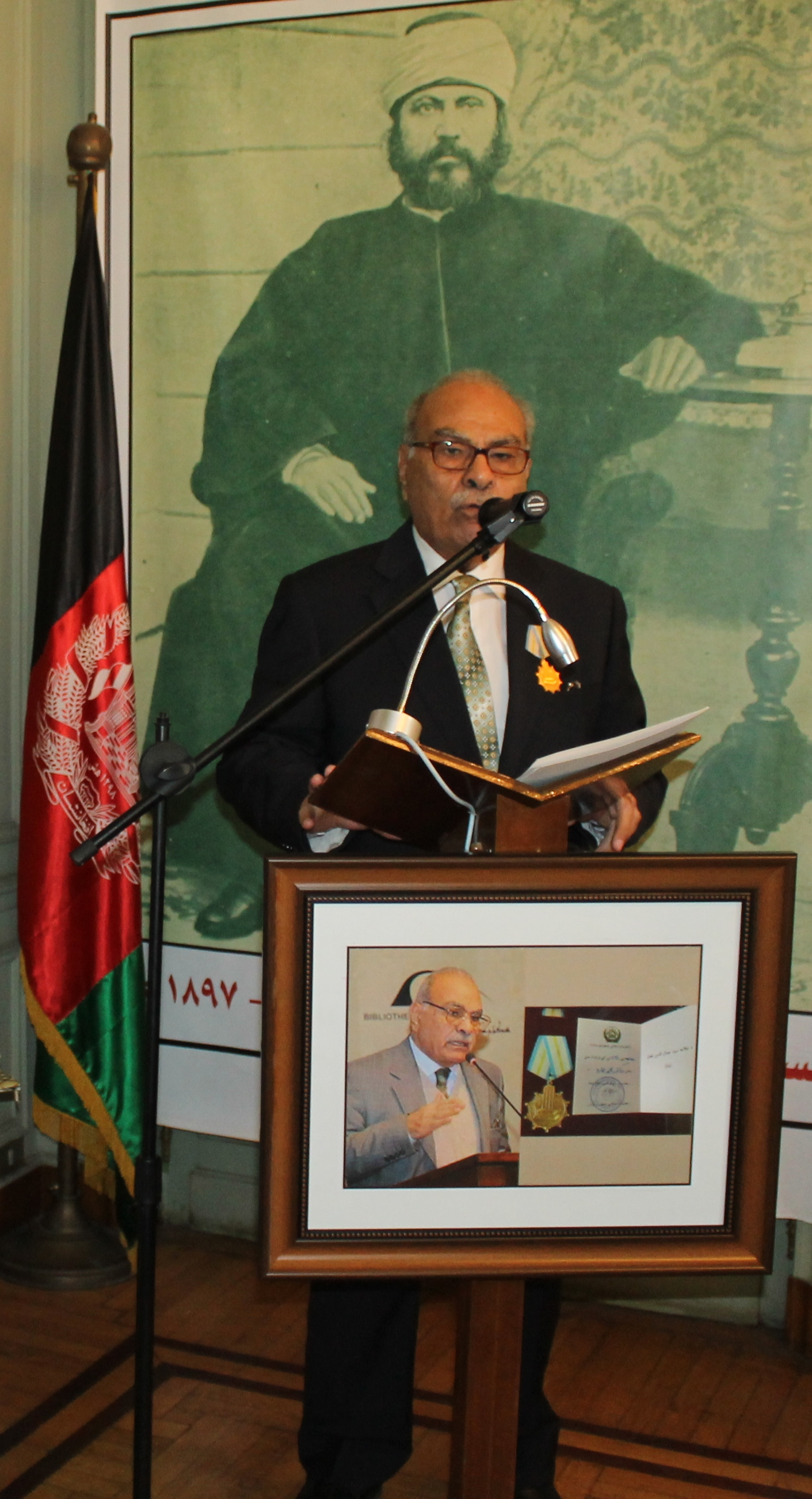
Muhammad Imara (2015).

Muhammad ʿImāra (8 December 1931, 1350 A.H. – 28 February 2020, 1441 A.H.) was an Islamic thinker, an author and editor, as well as a member of al-Azhar's Academy of Islamic research in Cairo.

== Works ==
Muhammad Imara authored "more than one hundred books on Islamic philosophy, the Quran, politics, and intellectual issues", including:

- Tayarat al-fikr al-Islami
- al-Tahrir al-Islamiy lilmar'ah
- al-Imam Muhammad 'Abduh: Mujadid al-dunya bitajdid al-din
- al-Islam wa huquq al-Insan: Darurat la Huquq
- al-Islām wa’l-ʿaqalliyyāt
- al-Gharb wa'l-Islam: ayn al-khatta' wa-ayn al-sawab?

== See also ==
- Mohammad Salim Al-Awa
- Mohammed al-Ghazali
- Yusuf al-Qaradawi
