= European Council for Fatwa and Research =

Islamic organization based in Dublin, Ireland

The European Council for Fatwa and Research (ECFR) is a Dublin-based private foundation, founded in London on 29–30 March 1997 on the initiative of the Federation of Islamic Organizations in Europe. The council is a largely self-selected body, composed of Islamic clerics and scholars, presided over by Yusuf al-Qaradawi.

== Goals and methodology ==
The stated goal of the ECFR is to issue fatwas that serve the needs of Muslims in Europe. The ECRF draws on all major schools of Sunni law as well as other traditional legal principles, such as objectives of sharia, concern for the public good, local custom, and the prevention of harm, in an effort to derive fatwas suitable for life in Europe. This methodology is intended to address situations which would be difficult to manage under a stricter interpretation of Islamic law, including using the doctrine of darura (necessity) to permit traditionally prohibited actions. The rulings of ECFR are nonbinding and are adopted through social acceptance.

== Membership ==
As of 2007, roughly two-thirds of the ECFR's 35 members resided in North America and Europe and the rest were from Muslim-majority countries. Yusuf al-Qaradawi, a prominent Egyptian-born jurist residing in Qatar, has served as the chairman of the ECFR since its founding. The composition of the membership was intended to buttress legitimacy of the Council both in the West and in the Muslim world.

== Positions and reception ==
A 2001 ECRF ruling allowed a female convert to Islam to remain married to her non-Muslim husband, based in part on the existence of European laws and customs which guarantee women the freedom of religion. Rulings of this kind have been welcomed by some, but also criticized by others as being overly eclectic in legal methodology and having potential to negatively impact the interpretation of sharia in Muslim-majority countries.

In August 2005, The Wall Street Journal reported that although the council's stated goal was to help Muslims integrate into European society, it is dominated by non-Europeans who have little grasp of what is acceptable in the West. A member of the Council cited the anti-Semitic forgery known as the Protocols of the Elders of Zion in a position paper arguing that Muslim families are under threat in Europe. It also reported that "the council is part of a web of organizations that spread ideology close to the Muslim Brotherhood throughout Europe".

In November 2026, Egypt designated the European Council for Fatwa and Research as a terrorist organization.

== Cooperation with other Islamic organisations in Europe ==
1. Al-Maktoum Charity Organisation, Dublin, Ireland
2. Millî Görüş (German and other sections)
3. Federation of Islamic Organisations in Europe
4. European Islamic Council in Belgium

== Members of the ECFR ==
1. Yusuf al-Qaradawi, President of ECFR (Egypt, Qatar)
2. Faisal Maulawi, Vice-President (Lebanon).
3. Hussein Mohammed Halawa, General Secretary (Ireland)
4. Dr. Ahmad Jaballah (France)
5. Dr. Ahmed Ali Al-Imam (Sudan)
6. Mufti Ismail Kashoulfi (United Kingdom)
7. Ahmed Kadhem Al-Rawi (United Kingdom)
8. Ounis Qurqah (France)
9. Rashid al-Ghannushi (Tunisia)
10. Abdallah Bin Bayyah (Saudi Arabia)
11. Abdul Raheem Al-Taweel (Spain)
12. Abdullah Ibn Ali Salem (Mauritania)
13. Abdullah Ibn Yusuf Al-Judai, (United Kingdom)
14. Abdul Majeed Al-Najjar
15. Abdullah ibn Sulayman Al-Manee' (Saudi Arabia)
16. Dr. Abdul Sattar Abu Ghudda (Saudi Arabia)
17. Dr. Ajeel Al-Nashmi (Kuwait)
18. Al-Arabi Al-Bichri (France)
19. Dr. Issam Al-Bashir (Sudan)
20. Ali Qaradaghi (Qatar)
21. Dr. Suhaib Hasan Ahmed (United Kingdom)
22. Tahir Mahdi (France)
23. Mahboub-ul-Rahman (Norway)
24. Muhammed Siddique (Germany)
25. Muhammad Ali Saleh Al-Mansour (United Arab Emirates)
26. Dr. Muhammed Al-Hawari (Germany)
27. Mahumoud Mujahed (Belgium)
28. Dr. Mustafa Cerić (Bosnia)
29. Nihad Abdul Quddous Ciftci (Germany)
30. Dr. Naser Ibn Abdullah Al-Mayman (Saudi Arabia)
31. Yusf Ibram (Switzerland)
32. Salah Soltan (Egypt, United States)
33. Salem Abdelmeguid (Netherlands)
34. Jasser Auda (Canada)

Half of the members are from the European continent and half are from the Arabian Peninsula, Northern Africa or Northern America. This is a breach of the internal rules of the ECFR, as members not residing in Europe "must not constitute more than 25% of the total members of the Council at any one time".

== See also ==
- Yusuf al-Qaradawi
- Qur'an
- Shari'a
- DALMO
