= Ali Ghaleb Himmat =

Italian businessperson

Himmat, Ali Ghaleb
- Born: 16 June 1938 (age 88); Damascus, Syria
- Occupation: Businessperson

Ali Ghaleb Himmat (Arabic: علي غالب همت; born 16 June 1938 in Damascus, Syria) is an Italian businessman who lives in Campione d'Italia, Italy, near Youssef Nada.

== Personal life ==
In the late 1970s and early 1980s, Himmat and Nada lived in the United States. In 1990 he received Italian citizenship.

His daughter Huda Himmat was deputy chair of the Forum of European Muslim Youth and Student Organizations (FEMYSO).

== Business activities ==
Himmat was managing director and co-founder of al Taqwa Bank, a company founded in Lugano in 1988.

== Religious activities ==
According to Ian Denis Johnson, author of the book A Mosque in Munich, Himmat is a member of the Muslim Brotherhood in Europe. From 1973 to 2002 Himmat ran the Islamic Community of Germany (IGD). Ibrahim El-Zayat, a former shareholder of the al Taqwa Bank, succeeded Himmat as Chairman of the IGD.

== Accusations of criminal activity ==
In early 2005, Al Taqwa Bank was accused of supporting al Qaeda. In 2005 the Attorney General of Switzerland canceled the criminal proceedings against the two Al Taqwa leaders Youssef Nada and Ghaleb Himmat.

Himmat was removed from the UNSCR 1267 sanctions list on 10 August 2009.

In April 2008 an Egyptian military court sentenced Himmat in absentia to ten years in prison for money laundering and supporting a banned organization. On 26 July 2012, Egyptian President Mohamed Morsi pardoned Himmat along with other Muslim Brotherhood officials sentenced by the Mubarak regime.
