= Daru-Al-Moameneen =

Islamic organization based in the United Kingdom

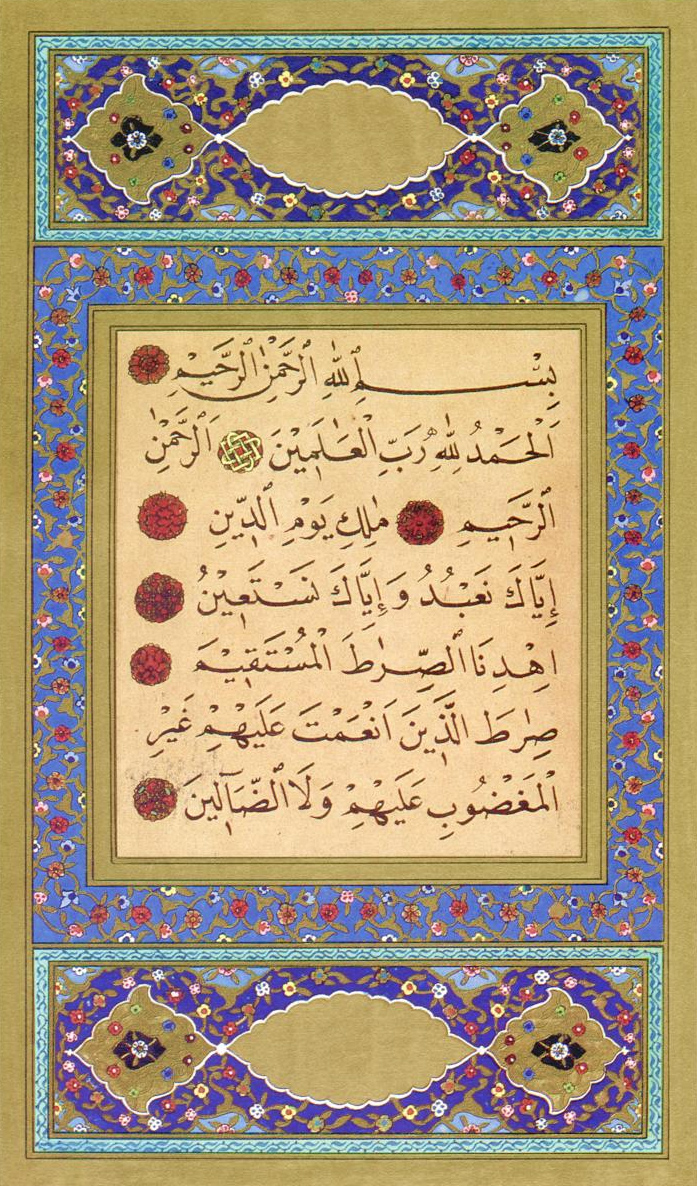
DALMO organises Quranic Recitation Classes for Children

Daru-Al-Moameneen (also known by its acronym; DALMO) Arabic: دار المؤمنين) is an Islamic organisation, founded in 2005 in Bradley Stoke, South Gloucestershire, representing the Muslims of the South West of England, UK. It is located at Grovelands House, Woodlands, Bradley Stoke, Bristol BS32 4JT

== Charity and courses ==
Daru-Al-Moameneen has had Arabic language courses for adults and Quranic recitation classes for children since February 26, 2006. DALMO is the regional Arabic language centre, administered by Muslim Association of Britain.

== Daily events ==
DALMO provides the facilities for daily salat (prayer) at their new premises in Bradley Stoke, Bristol, attracting area Muslims. DALMO also provides the opportunity for all its members to engage in sports activities every Saturday at the Bradley Stoke Community School.

Sports activities include:

- Badminton
- Football
- Basketball
- Table-tennis

== Religious rulings ==
DALMO's management committee uses the European Council for Fatwa and Research as its authority on sharia law. Therefore, DALMO bases its religious rulings, such as the ending of Ramadan (and hence the beginning of Eid-ul-Fitr) on the European group's decisions. This includes the combining of prayers etc.
