= Abdul Rahman Yusuf =

Egyptian poet

Abdul Rahman Yusuf al-Qaradawi (Arabic: عبد الرحمن يوسف القرضاوي; born September 18, 1970), is an Egyptian poet, using his poetry to address political and social issues of Arab society as well as aesthetics of Arabic poetry. Abdul Rahman is one of the sons of the late Egyptian Muslim cleric Yusuf al-Qaradawi who was affiliated with the Muslim Brotherhood.

Abdul Rahman, who holds Turkish citizenship, was convicted in absentia in a sham trial by an Egyptian military court on charges of "opposing the state" in 2017. The trial came after social media posts critical of the El-Sisi dictatorship and his role in backing the advocacy group Egyptian Movement for Change.

Following the 2024 fall of the Assad regime in Syria, Abdul Rahman celebrated the collapse and visited the country and the Umayyad Mosque. Shortly, he was arrested in Lebanon upon entering through the Masnaa crossing. Lebanese courts issued a ruling in January 2025 to extradite Abdul Rahman to the United Arab Emirates, rejecting calls from Amnesty International and other human rights organizations and putting Abdul Rahman at risk of torture.

Prior to his arrest by Lebanese authorities, Abdul Rahman lived in Turkey with his family. Abdul Rahman is a critic of the UAE, the Sisi regime in Egypt, and Saudi Arabia.

Abdul Rahman supports the Palestinian cause and resistance against the Israeli occupation. In a video he posted online, he said he believed that the Palestinian attacks against Israel on 7 October 2023 was a 'realistic scenario for the process of liberating Palestine'; before his arrest he'd posted an elegy praising Yahya Sinwar, the Hamas leader killed in October 2024 by Israeli forces.

On 8 January 2025, Lebanon extradited Abdul Rahman to the UAE.

He was pardoned by the UAE on 4 September 2026.

== Life ==
The third son of the Islamic scholar Yusuf al-Qaradawi, he was born on September 18, 1970. He has been a participant in several cultural seminars in Egypt and across the Arab world. He published his poems in Egyptian and Arabic magazines and newspapers.

A campaign leader for Mohammed El Baradei in the 2011 Egyptian revolution, he recalled the moment at which he reached Tahrir Square on 25 January 2011:

It was one of the most profound moments of my life. The sight of the square filled with tens of thousands heralded the long-awaited dawn. As we entered the square, the crowds installed there cheered the coming of a new battalion, greeting us with joy. I wept.

His sister, Ola Al-Qaradawi, spent four years in Egyptian military prisons in arbitrary detention.

== Works ==
He published seven poetry collections so far:

1. The bleeding letters, 1992 (نزف الحروف)
2. Facing the mirror, 2003 (أمام المرآة)
3. A toast to the homeland, 2004 (في صحة الوطن)
4. I have nothing to lose, 2005 (لا شيء عندي أخسره)
5. Talking plainly, July 2006 (على المكشوف)
6. Write the history of tomorrow, November 2006 (اكتب تاريخ المستقبل)
