= Jasser Auda =

Canadian scholar and professor of Islamic law

- Born: November 1966 (age 59); Cairo, Egypt
- Known for: Maqasid al-Shariah (Higher objectives of Sharia)

Academic background
- Education: University of Wales (PhD in Islamic law); University of Waterloo (PhD in Systems analysis)

Academic work
- Institutions: International Islamic University of Malaysia; Maqasid Institute for the Studies of the Quran (MISQ); Maqasid Institute Global; International Peace College, South Africa; University of Waterloo; Carleton University; Ryerson University; Alexandria University; Qatar Faculty of Islamic Studies; American University of Sharjah; University of Bahrain
- Notable works: Maqasid al-Shariah as Philosophy of Islamic Law: A Systems Approach, Maqasid al-Shariah: A Beginner’s Guide
- Website: www.jasserauda.net/portal/

Jasser Auda (born November 1966 in Cairo) is a Canadian scholar and professor specializing in Islamic law (Sharia) and its higher objectives, known as Maqasid al-Shariah. He was a founding president of the Maqasid Institute Global, a think tank with educational and research programs on Islamic law across multiple countries.

== Education and career ==
Auda earned two doctorates, one in the philosophy of Islamic law from the University of Wales, UK, and another in systems analysis from the University of Waterloo, Canada. His early education included memorizing the Quran and studying Islamic sciences at study circles in the Al-Azhar Mosque in Cairo.

Over the years, Auda has held academic positions across various institutions worldwide. In his home country Canada, he has been affiliated with the University of Waterloo, Carleton University, and Ryerson University. In the Middle East, his academic contributions extend to roles at the Qatar Faculty of Islamic Studies, the American University of Sharjah in the UAE, the University of Bahrain, and Alexandria University in Egypt. In East Asia, he held professorial positions at University of Brunei Darussalam, and currently with the International Islamic University of Malaysia. In 2015, he founded Honours, Masters and PhD programs in Applied Islamic Thought program at the International Peace College in South Africa.

In addition to his academic positions, Auda is a member of various Islamic legal councils. He is a member of the Fiqh Council of North America, the European Council for Fatwa and Research, a founding and board member of International Union of Muslim Scholars, and a fellow at the Fiqh Academy of India.

== Works and contributions ==
Auda has authored 25 books in Arabic and English, many of which have been translated into multiple languages. His works primarily address the philosophy of Islamic law, the concept of maqasid, and the role of Islamic jurisprudence in contemporary societies. Among his best-known publications are Maqasid al-Shariah as Philosophy of Islamic Law: A Systems Approach and Maqasid al-Shariah: A Beginner’s Guide, which have been translated into several languages, including Arabic, Bosnian, Italian, and Indonesian.

In addition to his books, Auda has contributed numerous research articles to academic journals, where he explores topics such as Sharia’s ethical goals, the incorporation of maqasid in public policy, and the dynamics between secular and religious values. His selected works include "Shariah, Ethical Goals and the Modern Society" (2016), "Al-Ijtihad al-maqasidi: Ru’ya Manzumiyyah" (2014), and "A Maqasidi Approach to Contemporary Application of the Shariah" (2011).

== Bibliography ==
=== Books ===
- Tarteeb al-‘Aql al-Muslim: Muraja’at fi daw’ al-sunan al-ilahiyyah wal-maqasid al-shar’iyyah (Reorganizing the Muslim Mind: Reflections in Light of Divine Universal Laws and Shariah Objectives). Al-Shabakah Al-Arabiyah, Beirut, 2017 (upcoming).
- Maqāsid al-Sharī`ah as Philosophy of Islamic Law: A Systems Approach, International Institute of Islamic Thought, London-Washington, several reprints: 2008-14. Translated to Arabic, Bosnian, Italian, Turkish, Malaysian and Indonesian. Various publishers: 2010-15.
- Maqāsid al-Sharī`ah: A Beginner’s Guide. London: International Institute of Islamic Thought (IIIT), many reprints, 2008-2016. Translated to: Arabic, Urdu, German, Indonesian, Malaysian, Russian, Azeri, Tamil, Bengali, Turkish, Japanese, Kurdish, Malayalam, French, Bosnian, Italian, Somali, Uzbek, Greek, Spanish, Korean, Thai, Somali, Amharic. Various publishers: 2009-16.
- Al-Dawlah al-Madaniyya: Nahwa tajawuz al-istibdad wa tahqeeq maqasid al-shariah (Civil State: Towards overcoming authoritarianism & realizing maqasid al-shariah), Al-Shabakah Al-Arabiyah, Beirut, 2015. Translated to: English, Italian, Malayalam, Bengali, & Malaysian.
- Al-Mar’ah fil-Masjid: Dawruha wa Makanatuha (Women in the Mosque: Their Role and Contribution), Dar Makased, Cairo 2015. Trans. to English, Indonesian, Bengali, Malaysian.
- Bayn al-shariah wal-siyasah: As’ilah li-marhalat ma ba’d al-thawraat (Between Shariah and Politics: Questions in the Post-Revolutions era). Beirut: Al-Shabakah Al-Arabiyyah, 2012, 2013. Translated to: Farsi, Malaysian, and Malayalam. Various publishers: 2013-2015.
- Al-Ijtihad al-maqasidi: Majmou’at buhouth (Purposeful Reasoning: Selected Papers). Beirut: Al-Shabakah Al-Arabiyyah, 2013, 2014. Translated to Urdu, Farsi and Tamil.
- Al-Sulouk ma’-Allah: Rihlah ma’a hikam Ibn Ataa-ellah fi daw’ al-kitab wal-sunnah wal-sunan al-ilahiyyah (Ethics with God: A Journey with Ibn Ataa-Ellah in light of the Quran, Sunnah, and Universal Laws). Cairo: Darul-Hidaiah, 2010. Translated to: English, Bosnian, Indonesian, Malaysian, Italian and Urdu, Various publishers: 2011-2015.
- Khulasat Bidāyat al-Mujtahid libni-Rushd (Averröes’s Premier of the Jurist: Synopsis and Commentary), India: Noor Foundation, 2006, 2007, and Cairo: Al-Shurouq, 2010.
- Fiqh al-Maqāsid: Inātat al-ahkām al-shar`īah bimaqāsidihā (Teleological Jurisprudence: Basing Islamic Rulings on their Purposes), International Institute of Islamic Thought, Virginia, 2006, 2007, 2008. Translated to: Urdu and Azeri, 2010.

=== Articles ===
- Shariah, Ethical Goals and the Modern Society. MUIS – Islamic Religious Council of Singapore Academy Series. Vol. 10. Singapore. 2016.
- "Al-Ijtihād al-maqāṣidī: Ru'yā Manẓūmiyyah (Ijtihad via Maqasid: A Systems Approach)". Al-Muslim Al-Muʿāṣir Journal (in Arabic). Cairo. 2014.
- "Kayfa nuḥaddid al-ʿalāqah bayna al-dīnī wa-al-madanī (How do we Define the Relationship between the Religious and the Secular?)". Al-Iḥyāʾ Journal (in Arabic) (5771). Morocco: Muḥammadan Council of Scholars. September 2013.
- "Qirāʾah fī uṭrūḥat al-dūktūrah lil-marḥūm Ismail Raji al-Faruqi: ḥawla ithbāt al-khayr (A Critical Reading of Ismail Raji al-Faruqi's PhD Thesis: On Justifying the Good)". Islamization of Knowledge Journal (in Arabic). Virginia: International Institute of Islamic Thought. 2013.
- "Tawẓīf maqāṣid al-sharīʿah fī tarshīd siyāsāt al-iqtiṣād al-maʿrifī (Utilizing Maqasid al-Shariah towards improving knowledge economy policies)". Islamization of Knowledge Journal (in Arabic). International Institute of Islamic Thought. 2012.
- "An Outline of the Islamic Maqāṣidī/Purpose-Based Approach". Q-Science Journal, Islamic Bioethics: The Interplay of Islam and the West. Bloomsbury. 2012.
- "Al-Ijtihād al-maqāṣidī (Ijtihad via Maqasid)". Islamiyyāt al-Maʿrifah Journal (in Arabic). International Institute of Islamic Thought. 2012.
- "A Maqāṣidī Approach to Contemporary Application of the Sharīʿah". Intellectual Discourse Journal. 19. Malaysia: Islamic University of Malaysia. 2011.
- "Basing the Juridical Rules on their Purposes". Tajdīd Journal (19). Malaysia: Islamic University of Malaysia. 2006.
- "Abrogation of Rulings: A Critique". Intellectual Discourse Journal. 12. Malaysia: Islamic University of Malaysia. 2004.
