= The Lawful and the Prohibited in Islam =

Book by Islamic scholar Yusuf al-Qaradawi

- Author: Yusuf al-Qaradawi
- Original title: الحلال والحرام في الإسلام
- Language: Arabic
- Subject: Islamic jurisprudence
- Genre: Non-fiction
- Publisher: American Trust Publications
- Publication date: 1960
- Publication place: Egypt
- English publication date: 1999
- Media type: Print (Paperback)
- Pages: 368
- ISBN: 978-0892590162
- OCLC: 1412651463

The Lawful and the Prohibited in Islam is a book by Islamic scholar Yusuf al-Qaradawi, originally published in 1960 under the Arabic title Al-Halal Wal-Haram Fil-Islam. Some translations into English of the work include those published by:

- Ahl-al-bait, with annotations and commentary by Allamah Shaikh Hasan Muhammad Taqi al-Jawahiri.
- American Trust Publications published January 30, 1999.
- El Falah, in 1997.
- Islamic Book Trust, Malaysia.

The book was briefly banned in France in 1995, following a government order on 24 April 1995, before the ban was repealed several weeks later on 9 May 1995.

== See also ==
- List of Sunni books
