= Yusuf al-Qaradawi =

Egyptian-born Qatari imam (1926–2022)

Sheikh Yusuf al-Qaradawi
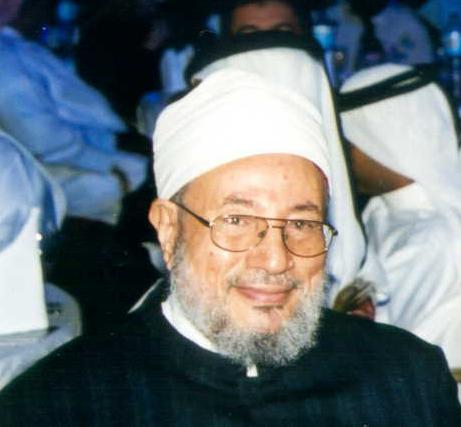
- al-Qaradawi in 2006
- Title: Sheikh

Personal life
- Born: Yusuf 'Abdullah al-Qaradawi; 9 September 1926 Saft Turab, Kingdom of Egypt
- Died: 26 September 2022 (aged 96) Doha, Qatar
- Children: Abdul Rahman Yusuf; Ilham Al-Qaradawi
- Era: Modern
- Notable work(s): Fiqh al-Zakat, al-Halal wa al-Haram fi al-Islam, Fiqh al-Jihad, Fiqh al-Awlawiyyat, Fiqh al-Dawlah, Madkhal li-Ma'rifat al-Islam and others
- Education: Al-Azhar University (Cairo, Egypt): 1952 – Alimiyya degree, College of Usul ad-Din (Religious Fundamentals of Islam); 1958 – Post-Graduate Diploma in Arabic Language Studies, Institute of Advanced Studies in Arabic Language and Literature; 1960 – Master's degree; 1973 – Ph.D. degree, Department of Quranic Studies at the College of Usul ad-Din
- Occupation: Islamic scholar
- Website: al-qaradawi.net

Religious life
- Religion: Islam
- Denomination: Sunni
- Movement: Modernism

Muslim leader
- Influenced by: Ibn Taymiyyah, Ibn Qayyim, Muhammad Abduh, Rashid Rida, Hassan al-Banna, Abul Hasan Ali Hasani Nadwi, Mohammed al-Ghazali
- Influenced: Rashid Al-Ghannushi, M.A.M. Mansoor
- Awards: King Faisal International Prize (Saudi Arabia) Prize of the Islamic University (Malaysia); International Holy Quran Award (Dubai) the Sultan Hassanal Bolkiah Prize (Brunei); Al-Owais Prize (UAE); Medal of Independence, First Class (Jordan); Top 10 in The 500 Most Influential Muslims (United Kingdom) Top 20 Intellectuals Worldwide by Foreign Policy magazine (Washington, D.C., United States)

Yusuf al-Qaradawi (Arabic: يوسف القرضاوي, romanized: Yūsuf al-Qaraḍāwī; or Yusuf al-Qardawi; 9 September 1926 – 26 September 2022) was an Egyptian Islamic scholar based in Doha, Qatar, and chairman of the International Union of Muslim Scholars. His influences included Ibn Taymiyya, Ibn Qayyim, Sayyid Rashid Rida, Hassan al-Banna, Abul Hasan Ali Hasani Nadwi, Abul A'la Maududi and Naeem Siddiqui. He was best known for his programme الشريعة والحياة, al-Sharīʿa wa al-Ḥayāh ("Sharia and Life"), broadcast on Al Jazeera, which had an estimated audience of 40–60 million worldwide. He was also known for IslamOnline, a website he helped establish in 1997 and for which he served as chief religious scholar.

Al-Qaradawi published more than 120 books, including The Lawful and the Prohibited in Islam and Islam: The Future Civilization. He also received eight international prizes for his contributions to Islamic scholarship, and was considered one of the most influential Islamic scholars living. Al-Qaradawi had a prominent role within the intellectual leadership of the Muslim Brotherhood, an Egyptian political organization, although he repeatedly stated that he was no longer a member and twice (in 1976 and 2004) turned down offers for the leadership of the organization.

Al-Qaradawi was sometimes described as a "moderate Islamist". Some of his views, such as his condoning of Palestinian suicide bombings against Israelis, caused reactions from governments in the West: he was refused an entry visa to the United Kingdom in 2008, and barred from entering France in 2012.

== Biography ==
Al-Qaradawi in the 1960s

=== In Egypt ===
Al-Qaradawi was born on 9 September 1926 in Saft Turab rural village in the Nile Delta, now in Gharbia Governorate, Egypt, into a poor family of devout Muslim peasants. He became an orphan at the age of two, when he lost his father. Following his father's death, he was raised by his mother and uncle. He read and memorized the entire Quran before he was ten years old.

He then joined the Institute of Religious Studies at Tanta, and graduated after nine years of study. While in Tanta, Al-Qaradawi first encountered Hassan al Banna, the founder of the Muslim Brotherhood, when al Banna gave a lecture at his school. Al-Qaradawi wrote of the lasting impact of this encounter, describing al Banna as "brilliantly radiating, as if his words were revelation or live coals from the light of prophecy."

After graduating from the Institute of Religious Studies he moved on to study Islamic Theology at the Al-Azhar University in Cairo, from which he graduated in 1953. He earned a diploma in Arabic Language and Literature in 1958 at the Advanced Arabic Studies Institute. He enrolled in the graduate program in the Department of Quran and Sunnah Sciences of the Faculty of Religion's Fundamentals (Usul al-Din), and graduated with a master's degree in Quranic studies in 1960. In 1962, he was sent by Al-Azhar University to Qatar to head the Qatari Secondary Institute of Religious Studies. He completed his PhD thesis titled Zakah and its effect on solving social problems in 1973 with First Merit and was awarded his PhD degree from Al-Azhar.

His connection with the Muslim Brotherhood led to imprisonment under King Farouq in 1949, then three more times during the term of President Gamal Abdul Nasser. He left Egypt for Qatar in 1961, and did not return until the overthrow of the military regime by the 2011 Egyptian Revolution.

=== Based in Qatar ===
In 1977, he laid the foundation for the Faculty of Shari'ah and Islamic Studies at the University of Qatar and became the faculty's dean. In the same year he founded the Centre of Seerah and Sunna Research. He also served at Egypt's Institute of Imams under the Ministry of Religious Endowments as supervisor before moving back to Doha as Dean of the Islamic Department at the Faculties of Shariah and Education in Qatar, where he continued until 1990. His next appointment was in Algeria as Chairman of the Scientific Council of Islamic University and Higher Institutions in 1990–91. He returned to Qatar once more as Director of the Seerah and Sunnah Center at Qatar University.

In 1997, Al-Qaradawi helped found the European Council for Fatwa and Research, a council of important and influential Muslim scholars dedicated to researching and writing fatwas in support of Western Muslim minority communities based in Ireland, and he served as its head. He also served as the chairman of International Union for Muslim Scholars (IUMS).

In the wake of the 2011 Revolution he returned to Egypt for the first time since leaving in 1961.

Al-Qaradawi was a principal shareholder and former Sharia adviser to Bank Al-Taqwa. On 2 August 2010, the bank was removed from a list of entities and individuals associated with Al Qaeda maintained by the United Nations Security Council.

Al-Qaradawi finished third in a 2008 poll on who was the world's leading public intellectual. The poll, Top 100 Public Intellectuals, was conducted among readers of Prospect Magazine (UK) and Foreign Policy (United States).

=== 2011 return to Egypt ===
After the 2011 Egyptian Revolution, Qaradawi made his first public appearance in Egypt after 1981. In Tahrir Square, he led Friday prayers on 18 February, addressing an audience estimated to exceed two million Egyptians. It began with an address of "O Muslims and Copts", referring to Egypt's Coptic Christian minority instead of the customary opening for Islamic Friday sermons "O Muslims". He was reported to have said, "Egyptian people are like the genie who came out of the lamp and who have been in prison for 30 years." He also demanded the release of political prisoners in Egyptian prisons, praised the Copts for protecting Muslims in their Friday prayer, and called for the new military rulers to quickly restore civilian rule. He referred to Hosni Mubarak as "the tyrannical pharaoh". In the sermon, Qaradawi called for the immediate release of political prisoners, the dissolution of the cabinet of Mubarak loyalists, and an end to the economic blockade of Gaza.

Brookings Institution member Shadi Hamid said that Qaradawi was in the mainstream of Egyptian society, and that he also had appeal among Egyptians who are not Islamist. He described the sermon as "nonsectarian" and "broadly political". In the Jerusalem Post, Barry Rubin wrote that although he was seen as a moderate by some in the West, he supported the straight Islamist line. Qaradawi was seen as a danger by Rubin because he was a charismatic thinker who could easily mobilise the masses. The author was concerned that Qaradawi would take over Egypt and that this would have had negative consequences for Israel.

On 21 February 2011, Qaradawi issued a fatwa, which is a religious ruling, permitting the killing of Muammar Gaddafi. This was in response to Gaddafi's plans to kill protesters in Libya. He also called on Libyan ambassadors around the world to distance themselves from Gaddafi's government.

=== Death ===
On the afternoon of 26 September 2022, Qaradawi died in Qatar at the age of 96. After a funeral service attended by thousands of people including the deputy emir of Qatar Abdullah bin Hamad bin Khalifa Al Thani, and other Qatari and foreign officials at Imam Mohammed bin Abdul Wahab Mosque, Qardawi was buried at Mesaimeer Cemetery in Doha.

== Views and statements ==
=== Religious and sectarian views ===
==== Extremism ====
Al-Qaradawi wrote on the danger of extremist groups of Islam, in his dissertation on the subject Islamic Awakening between Rejection and Extremism. This dissertation discusses the phenomenon of religious extremism among Muslim youth. He discusses the reasons why young Muslims may resort to extremism, and argues that many of these reasons are due to the hypocrisy and self-contradictions of older Muslims. He advised that the only way to rectify the situation is for older Muslims to reform themselves and their societies according to the actual teachings of Islam.

In 2014, Qaradawi stated that the declaration of an Islamic caliphate by the militant Islamic State of Iraq and Syria (ISIS) violates sharia law. Qaradawi said in a statement that the declaration "is void under sharia". This statement comes after ISIS leader Abu Bakr al-Baghdadi called on Muslims with military, medical and managerial skills to flock to its newly-declared pan-Islamic state.

==== Sufism ====
Al-Qaradawi was an avid caller to what he calls "Islamic Sufism", praising those who practice it as pious.

==== Shi'as ====
Qaradawi accused the Shi'ites of invading Sunni societies, and criticized some aspects of the Shi'i doctrine. He described them as "heretics" and said that Sunni leaders in the region have voiced concern about a Shiite resurgence.

Qaradawi's statements about the Shia sect of Islam have caused controversy and outrage among Shia leaders. His comments are seen as divisive and legitimising anti-Shia rhetoric. The reactions to his statements are politically motivated and could lead to a sectarian conflict.

The Iranian reaction to Qaradawi was particularly intense, with some Iranian officials apologising for the personal attack by Iranian Mehr News Agency, in which before this they described Qaradawi as "a spokesman for international Freemasonry and rabbis". Qaradawi argues that he was moved by indications of growing Shi'itization in Egypt and by the lack of awareness on the part of Sunnis and their ulama of that danger.

In May 2013, al-Qaradawi verbally attacked the Alawite sect, which many describe as an offshoot of Shia Islam and of which President Bashar al-Assad is a member, as "more infidel than Christians and Jews" (أكفر من اليهود والنصارى).

==== Non-Muslims ====
Qaradawi wrote that Islam does not prohibit Muslims from being kind and generous to people of other religions. However, Islam looks upon the People of the Book, that is, Jews and Christians, with special regard. He suggested that in having dialogue with the Jews and Christians, Muslims should avoid such approaches that may cause bitterness or arouse hostility.

According to Qaradawi, the verses in the Quran that tell Muslims to break ties with Jews and Christians (Al-Maidah 5:54-55) refer to those people who were hostile to Islam and waged war against Muslims. This means that Muslims are not allowed to help or be friends with people who are hostile towards Islam, even if it means going against their own interests.

In his book titled The Lawful and the Prohibited in Islam, al-Qaradawi wrote, "Islam does not prohibit Muslims to be kind and generous to peoples of other religions, even if they are idolaters and polytheists, ... it looks upon the People of the Book, that is, Jews and Christians, with special regard, whether they reside in a Muslim society or outside it. The Qur'an never addresses them without saying, 'O People of the Book' or 'O You who have been given the Book', indicating that they were originally people of a revealed religion. For this reason there exists a relationship of mercy and spiritual kinship between them and the Muslims."

==== Jews ====
In August 2005, The Wall Street Journal reported that the Dublin-based European Council for Fatwa and Research, of which al-Qaradawi was president, had used the antisemitic Protocols of the Elders of Zion in its theological deliberations. Al-Qaradawi's remarks were sharply criticized by the Anti-Defamation League (ADL), which accused him of inciting violence against Jews.

In a 9 January 2009 sermon during the Gaza War, shown on Al-Jazeera, Qaradawi prayed for Allah to take revenge on the "enemies of Islam", specifically the Jews, whom he described as treacherous, aggressors who have spread much tyranny and corruption. He asked Allah to annihilate them completely, without sparing any of them.

In his Friday sermon broadcast on Qatar TV on 26 April 2013, Qaradawi announced that he would not participate in next year's interfaith dialogue if Jews were invited, stating that there should be no debate with those who have committed injustice. He cited a verse from the Quran which says that there should be no debate with the People of the Book except in a way that is best, and went on to say that the Jews have committed great injustice and that "their hands are soiled with blood".

Qaradawi's statements were described as incitement to genocide in a Jewish Political Studies Review article, which connected his belief in Jewish conspiracies to the appeals to violence against them. Qaradawi asserted that Hitler meted out divinely sanctioned punishment to the Jews and called for Muslims to impose a similar punishment, calling openly for genocide. His appeals for genocide were coupled with paranoid conspiracy thinking that identifies the Jews as the greatest enemies of Islam; alleging a Jewish plot to take over the entire Middle East, including Mecca and Medina; blaming the Jews for the abolition of the Islamic Caliphate in 1924 and the spread of communism; and accusing the Jews of planning to tear down the al-Aqsa Mosque so as to build a Jewish Temple in its place.

==== Apostasy from Islam ====
Al-Qaradawi said that apostasy in Islam – Muslims leaving Islam – is a grave danger to the Muslim community and that the duty of all Muslims "is to combat apostasy in all its forms and wherefrom it comes, giving it no chance to pervade in the Muslim world". In February 2013, Qaradawi stated on Egyptian television that the death penalty is a necessity for those who leave Islam, citing several speeches and writings by Muhammad and his followers. He explains that many hadiths state that any apostate should be killed, and that this is necessary to preserve Islam.

In 2011, Al-Qaradawi wrote that execution is a valid penalty for apostasy, but only in cases where the apostate has also committed another crime. He advocates giving apostates a chance to repent before carrying out the sentence, and says that hidden apostates should not be punished by the Muslim community, but left to the judgement of God.

=== Political and views ===
==== Civil state v. theocracy ====
Al-Qaradawi spoke in favor of democracy in the Muslim world, speaking of a need for reform of political climates in the Middle East specifically. On 22 February 2011, he held an exclusive interview with OnIslam.net, dismissing the allegation that he wanted a religious state established in Egypt: "On the contrary, my speech supported establishing a civil state with a religious background, I am totally against theocracy. We are not a state for mullahs."

==== Terrorism ====
After the September 11 attacks, al-Qaradawi urged Muslims to donate blood for the victims and said:

Islam, the religion of tolerance, holds the human soul in high esteem, and considers the attack against innocent human beings a grave sin; this is backed by the Qur'anic verse that reads: "Who so ever kills a human being for other than manslaughter or corruption in the earth, it shall be as if he has killed all mankind, and who so ever saves the life of one, it shall be as if he had saved the life of all mankind," (Al-Ma'idah:32). The Prophet, peace and blessings be upon him, is reported to have said, 'A believer remains within the scope of his religion as long as he doesn't kill another person illegally.' Islam never allows a Muslim to kill the innocent and the helpless.

He denies that Palestinian suicide bombing attacks constitute terrorism, claiming, "when Palestinians face such unjust aggression, they tend to stem bloodletting and destruction and not to claim the lives of innocent civilians," but qualifies that with "I do agree with those who do not allow such martyr operations to be carried out outside the Palestinian territories."

Al-Qaradawi suggested the legitimate use of (defensive) suicide bombings against enemy combatants in modern times if the defending combatants have no other means of self-defense. The Oxford-based Malaysian Islamic Scholar, Dr. Afifi al-Akiti, rules that there is no Islamic legal precedent for this view and that female soldiers can only be killed in direct combat. With regards to suicide bombings he says that they are "breaching the scholarly consensus ... because to endanger one's life is one thing and to commit suicide during the attack is obviously another". With regards to male soldiers he states, "It goes without saying that they are considered combatants as soon as they arrive on the battlefield even if they are not in direct combat – provided of course that the remaining conventions of war have been observed throughout, and that all this is during a valid war when there is no ceasefire."

Western governments have met al-Qaradawi to request release of European civilians kidnapped in Iraq and have thanked him officially, praising his cooperation. The French Foreign Minister Michel Barnier wrote to al-Qaradawi: "With such a clear condemnation of the abduction of the French hostages you have sent a clear-cut message demonstrating respect for the tenets of Islam."

==== Israeli-Palestinian conflict ====
Al-Qaradawi supported suicide attacks on all Israelis, including women since he viewed the Israeli society as a "completely military" society that did not include any civilians. He also considered pregnant women and their unborn babies to be valid targets on the grounds that the babies could grow up to join the Israeli Army.

Defending bombings against Israeli civilians, al-Qaradawi told BBC Newsnight in 2005 that:

- "An Israeli woman is not like women in our societies, because she is a soldier."
- "I consider this type of martyrdom operation as an evidence of God's justice."
- "Allah Almighty is Just; through His infinite Wisdom He has given the weak a weapon the strong do not have and that is their ability to turn their bodies into bombs as Palestinians do."

In an interview with the newspaper Al Raya in April 2001, al-Qaradawi declared that suicide (or "martyrdom") bombings conducted by Palestinians against Israelis "are not suicide operations. These are heroic martyrdom operations, and the heroes who carry them out don't embark on this action out of hopelessness and despair but are driven by an overwhelming desire to cast terror and fear into the hearts of the oppressors."

On 8 May 2013, Qaradawi visited Gaza and gave a speech in support of Hamas. He asked all of the Palestinian people to work with other Arab people and Muslims around the world to destroy Israel, saying inflammatory things such as "Our wish should be that we carry out Jihad to death" and "We should seek to liberate Palestine, all of Palestine, inch by inch."

An Anti-Defamation League report in 2011 said that al-Qaradawi had voiced his desire to see Jerusalem conquered in a fatwa in which he claimed that it was the Muslims' duty to "defend" Jerusalem with "their lives, their money and all they possess, or else they will be subject to Allah's punishment."

==== Iraq war ====
In 2004 the International Union of Muslim Scholars, an organization chaired by al-Qaradawi which counts a great number of prominent individuals affiliated to the Muslim Brotherhood and/or Hamas among its members, ruled that "resisting occupation troops in Iraq is a 'duty' on able Muslims in and outside the war-torn country and that aiding the occupier is impermissible."

In an address aired on Qatar TV on 5 January 2007, al-Qaradawi questioned the trial of Saddam Hussein under American supervision in Iraq, but agreed to it if it were conducted by the Iraqi people "after liberating Iraq from American colonialism". He also suggested that the trial was "an act of vengeance by the Americans" for his missile attacks on Israel. He strongly criticized the way Saddam was hanged:

A human soul must be respected. These people did not respect the human soul. The man was calm and kept his cool. He refused to be blindfolded, and insisted upon facing death with open eyes.. and said the two parts of the shahada ... The man died saying: 'There is no God but Allah' ... Anybody whose last words are 'There is no God but Allah' goes to Paradise. The thing that improves [the record] of Saddam Hussein is that in his final years – as the brothers in Iraq tell us – he was a changed man. He began to strictly observe the prayers, to read the Quran, and to do charitable work. He would hasten to do anything that may help people. He would help build mosques, and would say that if anybody wants to build a mosque, the government should pay half the cost of the building materials. When they entered his secret hideout and caught him, they found a prayer carpet and an open Quran.

==== Hezbollah ====
In 2006, in response to Muslim scholar Abdullah Ibn Jibreen's fatwa declaring that it was forbidden for Muslims to support or pray for Hezbollah because they are Shia, al-Qaradawi said that supporting Hezbollah is a religious duty for all Muslims and that resistance, whether in Palestine or Lebanon, is the most noble act. He added "Shias agree with the Sunnis in the main principles of Islam while the differences are only over the branches" and also called upon the Sunnis and Shia of Iraq to end the civil war.

Seven years later, during the Syrian Civil War, Qaradawi urged all Sunnis to fight Hezbollah, attacking Hezbollah's leader Hassan Nasrallah and Iran: "The leader of the Party of Satan comes to fight the Sunnis ... Now we know what the Iranians want ... They want continued massacres to kill Sunnis." Qaradawi also stated that he now regretted having advocated rapprochement between Sunnis and Shias and his 2006 defense of Hezbollah.

==== Arab Spring ====
Qaradawi declared his support for the rebels led by the National Transitional Council in the 2011 Libyan civil war, urging Arab nations to recognize them and "to confront the tyranny of the regime in Tripoli". He suggested weapons be sent to the rebels to assist them, and said "Our Islamic nation should stand against injustice and corruption and I urge the Egyptian government to extend a helping hand to Libyan people and not to Gaddafi."

In response to the 2011 Bahrain protests, Qaradawi was reluctant to give support: "The protests in Bahrain are sectarian in nature. The Shias are revolting against the Sunnis." He claimed that Shia protesters attack Sunnis and occupied their mosques. He acknowledged that the Shia majority had legitimate concerns in regards to fairness with the Sunnis: "I want them to be real citizens of their country."

Qaradawi said that all Arabs should back up the protesters in the 2011 Syrian uprising, saying "Today the train of revolution has reached a station that it had to reach: The Syria station," and "It is not possible for Syria to be separated from the history of the Arab community." He declared his support for the protests against what he called Syria's "oppressive regime", claiming "atrocities" were committed by it. He called for victory against the ruling Ba'ath party and claimed the army would be the major factor in the revolt. He claimed that when he offered to mediate negotiations between the Muslim Brotherhood and the Syrian government, someone deliberately sabotaged it. Qaradawi also expressed his support for the No Fly zone put in place by western nations over Libya, saying "The operation in Libya is to protect the civilians from Gaddafi's tyranny" and slamming Arab League leader Amr Moussa for criticism of it.

=== Women, gender and other issues ===
Commenting on the role women played in social active issues:

Although over sixty years have passed since the Movement emerged into existence, no women leaders have appeared that can confront secular and Marxist trends single-handedly and efficiently. This has come about as a result of men's unrelenting attempts to control women's movement, as men have never allowed women a real chance to express themselves and show special leadership talents and abilities that demonstrate their capability of taking command of their work without men's dominance.

I believe that women's Islamic work will succeed and prove itself in the arena of the Islamic Movement only when it gives birth to female Islamic leaders in the fields of Call, thought, science, literature and education.

Accordingly, women as well as men can dedicate themselves to Allah, and play a role in jihad.

I do not think that this is impossible or even difficult. There are genius women just as there are genius men. Ingenuity is not a monopoly for men. It is not in vain that the Holy Quran tells us the story of a woman who led men wisely and bravely and made her people fare the best end: it is the Queen of Sheba, whose story with Solomon is told in Surat Al Naml. I have observed in the University of Qatar that girls make better students than boys.

==== Views on the Holocaust ====
Al-Qaradawi defended the mass murder of millions during the Holocaust as a "punishment." In a statement that aired on Al-Jazeera TV on 28 January 2009 during the Gaza War, al-Qaradawi said the following regarding Adolf Hitler and the Holocaust (as translated by MEMRI):

Throughout history, Allah has imposed upon the Jews people who would punish them for their corruption ... The last punishment was carried out by Hitler. By means of all the things he did to them – even though they exaggerated this issue – he managed to put them in their place. This was divine punishment for them ... Allah Willing, the next time will be at the hand of the believers.

==== Wife beating ====
Al-Qaradawi told The Guardian that wife beating was neither "obligatory nor desirable" but that he "accepts it as a method of last resort – though only lightly". He stated on Channel 4 News that it was justifiable in certain circumstances but the "ideal was for Muslim men never to beat their wives, and if husbands wrongly beat their wives, they have the right to fight back". The British newspaper The Daily Telegraph wrote that al-Qaradawi, in his book The Lawful and Prohibited in Islam, stated that wife-beating is permissible after the failure of all other means of persuasion. In such circumstances, a husband may beat his wife "lightly with his hands, avoiding her face and other sensitive areas".

==== Female genital mutilation (FGM) ====
Qaradawi said that female genital mutilation surgery is forbidden in Islam. He called for the termination and ban of "female circumcision" in some parts of the Muslim world, especially in rural Africa where most still practice it. His views were supported by Sheikhs in Al-Azhar.

==== Female masturbation ====
Qaradawi urged women to not masturbate and stated that it is dangerous to insert things into the vagina.

==== Homosexuality ====
On 5 June 2006, on the Al Jazeera program Sharia and Life, al-Qaradawi (a regular on the program) reiterated orthodox views on homosexuality. When asked about the punishment for people who "practise liwaat (sodomy) or sihaaq (lesbian activity)", al-Qaradawi replied: "The same punishment as any sexual pervert – the same as the fornicator." (MEMRI translation). The punishment for fornication is lashing.

In an interview with Der Spiegel, Qaradawi said that his attitude towards homosexuality is the same as that found in Christianity. In the interview he stated, "One year ago, there was a demonstration against me in London because I spoke out against homosexuality. People seem to have forgotten that it wasn't me who came up with this mindset. It's part of God's order spoken of by Moses and even mentioned by Jesus."

Rigorous scholarly debates among the Islamic School of Law (Fiqh) question whether LGBT people are defined by genetic disorders and that it may be permissible or not for those who're scientifically medically proven to be part of the LGBT category as with hermaphrodite denoting whether a person is inclined towards the naturality of female or male instinct. Same for Mukhannathun (transgender), in which there are many prophetic Hadith that allow males who have inclinations towards being female (effeminate) that occurred during the Islamic prophet Muhammad's time and that they were accepted as part of the larger community in Madinah having equal rights. Qaradawi was one of many leading Islamic scholars to weigh in on this ongoing debate.

==== Punishment of stoning ====
Al-Qaradawi called "stoning" un-Islamic for it has nothing to do with Islam at all but laws made by the religion of Judaism. He said there are more than dozens of verses in the Torah that support stoning for adulterers, fornicators, LGBT people, and for many other reasons.

==== Honor killing ====
Al-Qaradawi said that honor killing is a tradition that was carried out thousands of years ago by ancient civilization; the Romans, the Dark Ages, Chinese Emperors, etc. He said it has nothing to do with Islam; neither Qur'an nor Sunnah (Prophetic Hadith). He called on those who do it to be punished with death for their crime; a life for a life.

==== Mawlid (Muhammad's birthday) ====
Al-Qaradawi fully supported and advocated Mawlid. He said that to use the birth date of Muhammad in remembrance of his life story is not bid'ah. In fact, it is encouraged in Islam to do good action (Man Sanna Sunnatun Hassanah) based on a Sahih Hadith. And that Allah (God) himself has said in Al-Qur'an, Chapter 21, Verse 107:

And We have not sent you, [O Muhammad], except for mercy (rahmah) to all mankind.

— Al-Qur'an, 21:107

Al-Qaradawi explained that Allah (God) is talking about Muhammad's miracle birth as the verse mentions "sent you". In other words, his presence, his birth, his coming. A "mercy" (rahmah) to the worlds. Means mercy to all mankind. It means everything; all of his creations (all creatures).

Whoever starts a good action (sunnah) in Islam. He will be rewarded for his actions as well as getting the reward of those who've followed it successively until the Day of Judgment.

— Muhammad, narrated by Sahih Muslim, Hadith no. 1017

It's in this Sahih Hadith that al-Qaradawi emphasizes that good innovative actions are strongly encouraged as long as it doesn't go against the Sharia. What more involving religion itself than worldly good deeds like holding an old person's hand while crossing the road guiding him/her to safety and many more. It's encouraging for both. He said these are the true meaning and emphasis of Islam, to be the religion of mercy (rahmah) and to do more good than just good so that others may lead by our good examples and that they may successively follows them till the End of Time.

==== Niqab ====
Al-Qaradawi said that niqab (veil) is not obligatory in Islam. He pointed out that a woman's face is not an awrah. He called those who don the niqabs as following tradition and culture before Islam came to Arabia. Those people, be it male or female at that time, had to cover their faces from the dusty desert and from inhaling dust especially during sandstorms. Al-Azhar's Grand Imam, also an Egyptian Grand Mufti Sheikh Muhammad Sayyid Tantawy, have also pointed out that niqab has nothing to do with Islam.

==== Organ transplantation ====
At the same time Qaradawi issued a fatwa (edict) that organ transplantation from a living person to a living person is permissible in Islam but through donation as donation is considered charity. As for a dead person, only when the brain stops, the transplantation can then be carried out.

=== Other views ===
Mecca Time

In April 2008, at a conference in Qatar titled "Mecca: the Center of the Earth, Theory and Practice", al-Qaradawi advocated the implementation of Mecca Time to replace the Greenwich Meridian as the basis of the world time zone system.

Muhammed cartoon controversy

Al-Qaradawi called for a "Day of Anger" over the cartoons, but condemned violent actions in response to them.

Amman Message

Al-Qaradawi was one of the Ulama signatories of the Amman Message, which gives a broad foundation for defining Muslim orthodoxy.

Salman Rushdie

Al-Qaradawi said, "Rushdie disgraced the honor of the Prophet and his family and defiled the values of Islam," but he never backed the fatwa calling for his death.

Muslim Brotherhood

In 1997, Qaradawi's affiliation with the Muslim Brotherhood led to his expulsion from Egypt, where the organisation was prohibited at the time.

Al-Qaradawi was a follower of Hasan al-Banna during his youth and a longtime member of the Muslim Brotherhood. He twice turned down offers to be its leader. In an interview on the Dream channel, al-Qaradawi stated the following about his relationship with the Muslim Brotherhood (MB):

I joined the Muslim Brotherhood Group and worked with Imam al-Banna. I was influenced by al-Banna's moderate thoughts and principles ... (Later) MB asked me to be a chairman, but I preferred to be a spiritual guide for the entire nation ... MB consider me their Mufti, but I don't have a relation with the organization, because being an MB chairman is something difficult requiring a highly sophisticated wisdom, and I prefer to be devoted to the entire nation, and I feel comfortable with this decision. I like MB and consider them the nearest group to be righteous.

On 16 May 2015 al-Qaradawi was sentenced to death in absentia by an Egyptian court along with the ousted President Mohamed Morsi and over 100 other Egyptians affiliated with the Muslim Brotherhood. As reported by the Interpol website, Qaradawi was wanted by the judicial authorities of Egypt for "agreement, incitement and assistance to commit intentional murder, helping prisoners to escape, arson, vandalism and theft."

Reality TV

Qaradawi criticised reality television programs, saying that the aim of these is to 'mislead the [Muslim] nation'.

== Reception in the Muslim world ==
Al-Qaradawi was at the forefront of contemporary Muslim thinkers and scholars. His vast contributions include more than 80 books and hundreds of articles on different Islamic issues, ranging from the fundamental principles and laws of Islam to the needs and challenges of modern Muslim societies. His knowledge, intellect, moderation and unrelenting efforts to bring Islam to a larger audience gained him the respect of millions of Muslims and non-Muslims worldwide. His television program Ash-Shariah wal-Hayat (Sharia and Life) had an estimated 700–800 million viewers worldwide.

In 2012, Qaradawi traded barbs with fellow Muslim cleric Abu Abd al-Rahman Ibn Aqil al-Zahiri due to what Ibn Aqil perceived as hypocritical positions of Qaradawi during the Arab Spring, a charge he denied.

Pakistani scholar, Taqi Usmani stated, "There is no doubt that I—as the lowest student of Islamic Fiqh—with my benefitting from the books of the outstanding Dr al-Qaradāwī to a very large extent, and my supreme wonderment at the majority of [his works], have found myself, in some particular issues, not in agreement with him in the results that he has arrived at, but these sorts of differences (ikhtilāf) in views based on juristic judgement (ijtihādī) are natural, and cannot be the [sole] basis for judging [their author] so long as the people of knowledge do not deem [the bearers of such opinions] to be weak intellectually, or in religion, and [in any case] the importance of these books and their value in scholarship and da'wa are not affected by this to even the slightest, most insignificant degree."

In addition, he refers to some modern scholars by writing, "What we see today, very unfortunately, is that the one who brings forward elevated ideas in his writings and lofty theories in his speech and his sermons often does not rise above the level of the layman" but exempts Qaradawi by saying, "As for the outstanding, erudite scholar, Dr Yūsuf al-Qaradāwī, may God (Most High) preserve him, God (Most High) has indeed made me fortunate enough to accompany him in travels and in residence, and sit with him and closely associate with him in long and repeated meetings. [From this] I found him manifest in his personality exemplary Islamic qualities, for he is a human being before he is a Muslim, and a devoted Muslim before he is a caller to Islam (dā'i), and a caller to Islam before he is a scholar and jurist."

The Doğu Türkistan Bülteni Haber Ajansı, which supports the Turkistan Islamic Party, attacked al-Qaradawi and called his creed "perverted" and claimed that he was followed by "democratic polytheists". Qaradawi was attacked by Hani Al-Siba'i.

== Controversy ==
=== On Syria and Russia ===
Qaradawi stated that Russia was an "enemy of Islam" due to the country's military relations with the Syrian regime.

His remarks drew harsh criticism from Muslims in Russia. According to Chechen President Ramzan Kadyrov, "Qaradawi's statements had given rise to amazement among the Muslims of Russia." Kadyrov asserted that Qaradawi's statements were mainly "directed against the Muslims of Russia, who are citizens of this country, were born here and live here, and who care about their country".

Kadyrov claimed that "It is not Russia that is supplying weapons and money for the thousands of mercenaries from all over the world who have flooded Syria and are committing daily terrorist attacks, in which the blood of women, old people and children is shed."

=== Entry into western countries ===
Al-Qaradawi was banned from entering the United States since 1999 and the United Kingdom since 2008, though he visited London in 2004. The lobby group MEMRI said it helped play a role in the measures. In July 2003, he visited Stockholm, Sweden, for a conference at the Stockholm Mosque arranged by the Muslim Association of Sweden. During the conference al-Qaradawi expressed his support for suicide attacks against Israeli civilians, calling the fight against the Israeli occupation of the Palestinian Territories a "necessary Jihad". France announced in March 2012 it will not let him enter.

=== Fatwa controversy with MEMRI ===
The Middle East Media Research Institute (MEMRI) (citing Asharq Al-Awsat), alleges that al-Qaradawi issued a Fatwa following the Iraqi insurgency, saying,

All of the Americans in Iraq are combatants, there is no difference between civilians and soldiers, and one should fight them, since the American civilians came to Iraq in order to serve the occupation. The abduction and killing of Americans in Iraq is a [religious] obligation so as to cause them to leave Iraq immediately. The mutilation of corpses is forbidden in Islam.

Al-Qaradawi denied this allegation:

I have not published a Fatwa on this issue. At the Egyptian Journalists' Union a few days ago I was asked about the permissibility of fighting against the occupation in Iraq, and I answered that it is permitted. Afterwards I was asked concerning the American civilians in Iraq and I merely responded with the question – are there American civilians in Iraq? It is a matter of common knowledge that in Fatwas such as these I do not use the word "killing" but rather I say "struggle", which is a more comprehensive word than the word "killing" and whose meaning is not necessarily to kill. In addition, I have condemned the taking of hostages on a number of occasions in the past and have demanded that they be released and that their lives not be threatened.

Shaker Al-Nabulsi, a former Muslim who writes for the liberal site Ethal, called for the creation of a petition to the UN calling to put Qaradawi and his like on trial for incitement and support of terrorism.

=== Alcohol fatwa controversy ===
Al-Qaradawi issued a fatwa in 2008, stating that the consumption of tiny amounts of alcohol (<0.5% concentration or 5/1000, such as found in energy drinks) was acceptable for Muslims, in beverages where the fermentation is natural and unavoidable and is too small to lead to intoxication.

== Terrorist allegations ==
In October 2004, according to Saudi Arabian newspaper Arab News, based in New York and Jeddah, over 2,500 Muslim intellectuals from 23 countries signed a petition addressed to the United Nations to raise awareness on the use of religion for incitement to violence. Al-Qaradawi was mentioned among "the sheikhs of death," as the signatories defined those who manipulate religion to incite violence, for "providing a religious cover for terrorism." Al-Qaradawi dismissed this charge as baseless and slanderous for his stance was that the self-proclaimed caliphate of the Islamic State was "void under sharia".

Qaradawi was banned from entering the U.S. in 1999. In 2008, the UK Home Office stated that al-Qaradawi was denied a visa to enter Britain for medical treatment because of fears that his preaching "could foster inter-community violence." In March 2012, the French President Nicolas Sarkozy declared his decision to block the entry of extremists in the country after the Toulouse attacks, and specifically mentioned al-Qaradawi as one of those barred from entering France.

Qaradawi chaired the Union of Good, a coalition of Islamic charities supporting Hamas' infrastructure, an organisation on the US State Department list of foreign terrorist organizations. In December 2014 the International Union of Muslim Scholars led by al-Qaradawi was expelled from the Cairo-based International Islamic Council for Da'wah and Relief based on the allegation that the group mixed religion and politics and supported terrorism.

The Consortium Against Terrorist Finance reported that, in 2010, Qaradawi was listed as the chairman of the Sharia supervisory board of Qatar Islamic Bank, one of the Qatari sharia-compliant giants which allegedly had a long history of cooperation with controversial financial entities. He was also a former Sharia adviser and shareholder to Bank al-Taqwa, once listed by the U.S and the UN as a terrorist financier associated with al-Qaeda but delisted in 2010.

== Personal life ==
Al-Qaradawi was born in Egypt but lived in Qatar. He had three sons and four daughters, three of whom hold doctorates from British universities. His daughter, Ilham Yusuf Al-Qaradawi, is an internationally recognized nuclear scientist. His son, Abdulrahman Yusuf al-Qaradawi, is a poet and a political activist in Egypt.

== Awards and recognition ==
Al-Qaradawi received awards from various countries and institutions for his contributions to Islamic society. Among them are

- The Islamic Development Bank (IDB) Prize in Islamic Economics – 1991
- King Faisal International Prize for Islamic Studies – 1994
- Sultan Hassanal Bolkiah (Sultan of Brunei) Award for Islamic Jurisprudence – 1997
- Sultan Al Owais Award for Cultural & Scientific Achievements – 1998–1999
- Dubai International Holy Quran Award for Islamic Personality of the Year – 2000
- The State Acknowledgement Award for contributions in the field of Islamic Studies from the Government of Qatar – 2008
- Tokoh Ma'al Hijrah (Hijra of the Prophet) award by the Malaysian Government −2009

The Qatar Faculty of Islamic Studies, part of the Qatar Foundation for Education, Science and Community Development, instituted the "Sheikh Yusuf Al Qaradawi Scholarships" in 2009, awarding them to five students each year for post-graduate studies. It also named after him its newly established research centre, The Qaradawi Center for Islamic Moderation and Renewal.

The State Merit Prize for Islamic Studies was issued to Qaradawi by the Ministry of Culture, Arts and Heritage of Qatar on 3 November 2009.

Al-Qaradawi was a trustee of the Oxford Centre for Islamic Studies and was named as the technical consultant for a multimillion-dollar English-language film about Mohammed, produced by Barrie Osborne. A 2008 Foreign Policy online poll put him at No.3 in the list of the Top 20 Public Intellectuals worldwide.

== Books ==
Al-Qaradawi authored more than 120 books and his academic style and objective thought are considered to be some of the main characteristics of his works. His most famous work is The Lawful and Prohibited in Islam. Professor Mustafa al-Zarqa declared that owning a copy of it was "the duty of every Muslim family".

=== Fiqh al-Zakat ===
His book Fiqh al-Zakat is considered by some as the most comprehensive work in the area of zakat. Abul Ala Maududi commented on it as "the book of this century in Islamic jurisprudence (fiqh)". The prominent Deobandi Islamic scholar Taqi Usmani, said this about the work:

The first book that read in its entirety of his works is his valuable book Fiqh al-Zakat, and I benefitted much from this great, encyclopedic, rewarding work through which the author did a great service to the second of the pillars of Islam, in a way that the umma needs today, when it comes to the application of zakat at the level of the individual and the group. Indeed this work manifested the genius of its author, and his inventive methodology, not only in the clarification of issues pertaining to zakat and their compilation, but in stimulating research in contemporary topics that no one before him had touched upon, and basing them upon the principles fiqh and its jurisprudential theory.

=== Fiqh al-Jihad ===
His book Fiqh al-Jihad has been widely commented on. The Guardian writes:

Instead Qaradawi encourages a "middle way" conception of jihad: "solidarity" with the Palestinians and others on the front line, rather than violence, is an obligatory form of jihad. Financial jihad, which corresponds with the obligation of alms giving (zakat), counts as well. And Muslims should recognise that technological change means that media and information systems are as much a part of the jihadist repertoire as are guns. Indeed, as long as Muslims are free to use media and other resources to press their case, there is no justification for using force to "open" countries for Islam.

This book has also been analyzed by University of Southern California professor Sherman Jackson and Tunisian Islamist scholar-politician Rachid Ghannouchi.

== Major works ==
Yusuf al-Qaradawi wrote many books, some of which were translated into English:

- Islam: Modern Fatwas on Issues of Women and the Family (Fatawa Mu'asira fi Shu'un al-Mar'a wa al-Usrah) (Dar al-Shihab, Algeria, 1987)
- Auspices of the Ultimate Victory of Islam, Doha (1996)
- Towards a Sound Awakening
- The lawful and the prohibited in Islam=al-Halal wal-haram fil Islam. Indianapolis, IN, USA: American Trust Publications. 1999. ISBN 978-0-89259-016-2.
- The desired Muslim generation. Riyadh: International Islamic Publishing House. 1999. ISBN 978-9960-850-24-5.
- Diversion and Arts In Islam (in progress)
- Non muslims in the Islamic society. Indianapolis, Ind., USA: American Trust Publications. 1985. ISBN 978-0-89259-049-0.
- Priorities of the Islamic movement in the coming phase. Cairo: al-Dār. 1992. ISBN 978-977-00-4083-6.
- Fiqh az-zakat : a comparative study : the rules, regulations and philosophy of Zakat in the light of the Qurʼan and Sunna. London: Dar Al Taqwa. 1999. ISBN 978-1-870582-12-4.
- Contemporary fatawa : current issues in Islamic fiqh. Newark, NJ: Islamic Book Service. 1999. ISBN 978-1-892004-00-0.
- Time in the life of a Muslim. London: Ta-Ha. 2000. ISBN 978-1-84200-007-6.
- Sincerity: The Essential Quality. MAS Publications. 2006.
- Approaching the Sunnah : comprehension & controversy. London Washington D.C: International Institute of Islamic Thought. 2007. ISBN 978-1-56564-418-2.
- Islamic awakening between rejection and extremism. Kuala Lumpur Herndon, Va: Islamic Book Trust The International Institute of Islamic Thought. 2010. ISBN 978-967-5062-53-7.
- Islam : an introduction. Kuala Lumpur, Malaysia: Islamic Book Trust. 2010. ISBN 978-967-5062-35-3.
- Economic security in Islam. Kuala Lumpur: Dar Al Wahi Publication. 2010. ISBN 978-983-43614-9-5.

Amongst his dozens of works in Arabic, we cite:

- Ghayr al-Muslimīn fī al-mujtanaʻ al-Islāmi. Cairo: Maktabat Wahbah. 1977. ISBN 978-977-723-655-3.
- Ayna al-khalal. Cairo: Dār al-Ṣaḥwah. 1985. ISBN 978-977-14-3047-6.
- Awāmil al-saʻah wa-al-murūnah fī al-sharīʻah al-Islāmīyah. Cairo: Dār al-Ṣaḥwah. 1985. ISBN 978-977-14-3046-9.
- al-ʻIbādah fī al-Islām. Cairo: Maktabat Wahbah. 1985. ISBN 978-977-307-043-4.
- al-Nās wa-al-ḥaqq. Cairo: Maktabat Wahbah. 1986. ISBN 978-977-307-093-9.
- Bayʻ al-murābaḥah lil-āmir bi-al-shirāʼ ka-mā tujrīhi al-maṣārif al-Islāmīyah : dirāsah fī ḍawʼ al-nuṣūṣ wa-al-qawāʻid al-sharʻīyah. Cairo: Maktabat Wahbah. 1987. ISBN 978-977-307-086-1.
- al-Īmān wa-al-ḥayāh. Cairo: Maktabat Wahbah. 1990. ISBN 978-977-307-210-0.
- Malāmiḥ al-mujtamaʻ al-Muslim alladhī nanshuduh. Cairo: Maktabat Wahbah. 1993. ISBN 978-977-225-036-3.
- Dawr al-qiyam wa-al-akhlāq fī al-iqtiṣād al-Islāmi. Cairo: Maktabat Wahbah. 1995. ISBN 978-977-225-060-8.
- Fī fiqh al-awlawīyāt : dirāsah jadīdah fī ḍawʼ al-Qurʼān wa-al-sunnah. Cairo: Maktabat Wahbah. 1995. ISBN 978-977-225-068-4.
- al-Islām wa-al-fann. Cairo: Maktabat Wahba. 1996. ISBN 978-977-225-084-4.
- al-Aqallīyāt ad-dīnīya wa-l-ḥall al-islāmi. Cairo: Maktabat Wahba. 1996. ISBN 978-977-225-097-4.
- al-Mubashshirāt bi-intiṣār al-Islām. Cairo: Maktabat Wahbah. 1996. ISBN 978-977-225-098-1.
- Min fiqh al-dawlah fī al-Islām : makānatuhā-- maʻālimuhā-- ṭabīʻatuhā, mawqifuhā min al-dīmuqrāṭīyah wa-al-taʻaddudīyah wa-al-marʼah wa-ghayr al-Muslimīn. Cairo: Dār al-Shurūq. 1997. ISBN 978-977-09-0375-9.
- al-Ṣaḥwah al-Islāmīyah wa-humūm al-waṭan al-ʻArabi. Cairo: Dār al-Shurūq. 1998. ISBN 978-977-09-0402-2.
- Thaqāfatunā bayna al-infitāḥ wa-al-inghilāq. Cairo: Dār al-Shurūq. 2000. ISBN 978-977-09-0658-3.
- al-Īmān bi-al-qadar. Beirut: Muʼassasah al-Risālah Nāshirūn. 2001. ISBN 978-9953-400-10-5.
- Fī fiqh al-aqallīyāt al-Muslimah : ḥayāt al-Muslimīn wasaṭ al-mujtamaʻāt al-ukhra. Cairo: Dār al-Shurūq. 2001. ISBN 978-977-09-0735-1.
- Riʻāyat al-bīʼah fī sharīʻat al-Islām. Cairo: Dār al-Shurūq. 2001. ISBN 978-977-09-0691-0.
- al-Sunnah wa-al-bidʻah. Cairo: Maktabat Wahbah. 2003. ISBN 978-977-225-134-6.
- Fī wadāʻ al-aʻlām. Beirut: Dār al-Fikr. 2003. ISBN 978-1-59239-141-7.
- al-Islām alladhī nadʻū ilayh. Cairo: Maktabat Wahbah. 2004. ISBN 978-977-225-182-7.
- al-Ṣaḥwah al-Islāmīyah : bayna al-āmāl wa-al-maḥādhīr. Cairo: Maktabat Wahbah. 2004. ISBN 978-977-225-179-7.
- Miʼat suʼāl ʻan al-ḥajj wa-al-ʻumrah wa-al-uḍḥiyah wa-al-ʻīdayn. Cairo: Maktabat Wahbah. 2004. ISBN 978-977-225-177-3.
- al-Islām wa-'l-ʻunf : naẓarāt taʼṣīlīya. Cairo: Dār al-Shurūq. 2005. ISBN 978-977-09-1211-9.
- Naḥnu wa-al-Gharb : asʼilah shāʼikah wa-ajwibah ḥāsimah. Cairo: Dār al-Tawzīʻ wa-al-Nashr al-Islāmīyah. 2006. ISBN 978-977-265-696-7.
- al-Islām kamā nuʼminu bihī ḍawābiṭ wa-malāmih. Cairo: Dār Nahḍat Miṣr li-ṭ-Ṭibāʻa wa'n-Nashr wa-'t-Tauzi. 2006. ISBN 978-977-14-3357-6.
- Dirāsah fī fiqh maqāṣid al-sharīʻah : bayna al-maqāṣid al-kullīyah wa-al-nuṣūṣ al-juzʼīyah. Cairo: Dār al-Shurūq. 2006. ISBN 978-977-09-1481-6.
- Kayfa nataʻāmalu maʻa al-Qurʼān al-ʻAẓīm. Cairo: Dār al-Shurūq. 2006. ISBN 978-977-09-0496-1.
- al-Dīn wa-al-siyāsah : taʼṣīl wa-radd shubuhāt. Cairo: Dār al-Shurūq. 2007. ISBN 978-977-09-1971-2.
- Fiqh al-Jihād: Dirāsah Muqāranah li-Aḥkāmih wa Falsafatih fī Ḍaw' al-Qur'ān wa al-Sunnah. Cairo: Maktabat Wahbah. 2009. ISBN 978-977-225-246-6.
- al-Waraʻ wa-al-zuhd. Cairo: Maktabat Wahbah. 2010. ISBN 978-977-225-269-5.
- Fiqh al-wasaṭīyah al-Islāmīyah wa-al-tajdīd : maʻālim wa-manārāt. Cairo: Dār al-Shurūq. 2010. ISBN 978-977-09-2902-5.
- Ḥayāt al-marʼah al-Muslimah : fī iṭār al-ḥudūd al-sharʻīyah. Cairo: Maktabat Wahbah. 2011.
- al-Sunnah wa-muwājahat ḥamalāt al-tashkīk. Cairo: Maktabat Wahbah. 2011. ISBN 978-977-225-313-5.

He also published some excerpts of his poetry in the book Nafahat wa Lafahat. Al-Qaradawi was also the subject of the book The Global Mufti: The Phenomenon of Yusuf al-Qaradawi published by Columbia University Press. He is also profiled as one of the leading liberal voices in contemporary Islam in Charles Kurzman's book Liberal Islam: A Sourcebook, published by Oxford University Press.

== See also ==
- Abdullah bin Bayyah
- Khurshid Ahmad
- Muhammad Imara
