= Omar Al-Jasser =

Saudi actor, writer, and director

Omar Mohammed Al-Jasser
- Born: 1962 (age 63–64); Jeddah
- Citizenship: Saudi
- Education: Bachelor's degree in sociology
- Years active: 1984–present

Omar Mohammed Al-Jasser (Arabic: عمر الجاسر; born 1962 in Jeddah, Makkah Al-Mukarramah Province) is a Saudi actor, writer, and director, recognized as one of the leading figures in the development of theater in Saudi Arabia. He founded the Kingdom's first officially recognized private theatrical troupe and established the first private-sector theater. Al-Jasser also served as the Director of the Culture and Arts Society in Jeddah, playing a pivotal role in advancing Saudi theater and cultural activities. He later attended King Abdulaziz University, where he earned a bachelor's degree in sociology.

== Career ==
He was appointed Secretary-General of the Arab Artists Union in June 2022. In September 2024, the Executive Office of the Arab Artists Union issued a decision to extend his tenure in this position.
