= International Union of Muslim Scholars =

International Muslim organization

- الاتحاد العالمي لعلماء المسلمين
- Abbreviation: IUMS
- Members: 95,000 Muslim scholars; 67 organizations
- Secretary General: Ali al-Qaradaghi since 2022
- Key people: Omani Grand Mufti Ahmed bin Hamad al-Khalili, Abdolhamid Ismaeelzahi, Salman al-Ouda, Yusuf al-Qaradawi (founding chairman)
- Website: iumsonline.org/en

The International Union of Muslim Scholars (IUMS; Arabic: الاتحاد العالمي لعلماء المسلمين; al-Ittiḥād al-ʻĀlamī li-ʻUlāmāʼ al-Muslimīn) is an independent international body of Islamic theologians, currently headed by Ali al-Qaradaghi since 2022. Founded in 2004, with its headquarters split between Qatar and Dublin, the largely Sunni group works to centralize international Islamic jurisprudence.

IUMS consists of around 95,000 Muslim scholars globally and 67 Islamic organizations; the union claims to bring together Sunni scholars of all four madhabs, along with Shia and Ibadi Muslims. It says it accepts those who attend to the sciences of Shari’ah and Islamic civilization, who have significant writings in the field, or have contributed to some tangible activity thereof. It has worked closely with the Muslim World League, the Malaysian Department of Islamic Development, and the Arab Maghreb Scholars League in the past.

The group participates in extensive diplomacy over Muslim issues internationally. Among its most prominent current and former members include Saudi Islamic scholar Salman al-Ouda, former Palestinian Prime Minister Ismail Haniyeh, chief Iranian Sunni cleric Abdolhamid Ismaeelzahi, Malaysian politician and religious leader Ahmad Awang, and Mauritanian scholar Mohammad Al-Hasan Al-Dido.

The union has taken some political stances in the past, including backing Palestinian statehood, opposing Quran burnings in Europe, supporting Qatar during the Qatar diplomatic crisis, and opposing the Assad regime in Syria. It has also helped launch the Qatar-based Center for Islamic Legislation and Ethics.

In 2017, the IUMS was banned and listed as a terrorist organization by a bloc of Arab countries hostile to Qatar, including Egypt, Saudi Arabia, the United Arab Emirates and Bahrain; the move was received with backlash from Turkey.

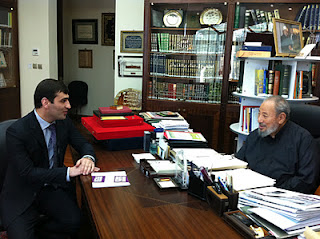
Journalist Ahmet Azimov speaks with early IUMS leader, Egyptian Islamic scholar Yusuf al-Qaradawi

== Background and work ==
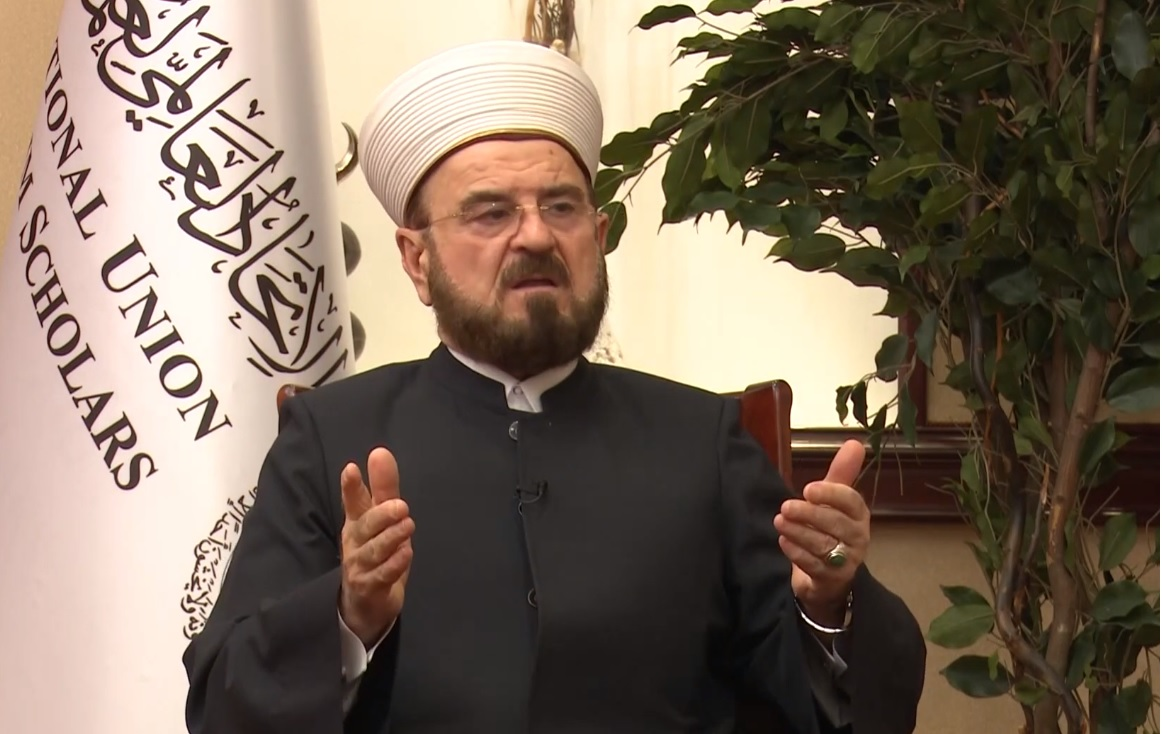
IUMS Secretary General Ali al-Qaradaghi

IUMS does not follow any specific country, group, or sect. It is not hostile to governments, but rather seeks to open windows of cooperation for the good of Islam and Muslims.

In its "desired characteristics", the IUMS includes being by Muslims for Muslim and about Islam; international; independent of governments (though "not hostile to governments") and sects ("it is only proud of belonging to Islam and its transnational community - Ummah"); interested in scholarly Islamic knowledge, teaching, and education; concerned with the call (Da'wah) to Islam "by tongue, pen, and every contemporary legitimate medium; be it recorded, audio, or visual"; moderation ("the centermost approach of the centermost Ummah"); and vitality.

According to former IUMS president Yusuf al-Qaradawi, the international union plays a political role in Arab and Muslim issues through mediation efforts. It attempted to mediate between various factions in Egypt before 2013 and Yemen before the Houthi expansion. They claim to have conducted successful mediation efforts in Kyrgyzstan in 2010 between the Kyrgyz and the Uzbeks. The IUMS distinguishes itself from other Muslim organizations (being "truly different from all that exists") in its aims to be international.

IUMS is not a local or a regional union, neither an Arab nor a national one, neither an eastern, nor a western union; rather, it represents all of the Muslims in the entire Islamic world, as well as all of the Muslim minorities and Islamic groups outside of the Muslim world.

According to one source, the IUMS works to "promote dialogue between Muslim scholars of all stripes and includes prominent Shia figures."

=== Headquarters ===
The IUMS was headquartered at the Islamic Cultural Centre of Ireland near Dublin, Ireland, with the offices of the Secretary General in Qatar.

=== Funding ===
In May 2012, a charity dinner in Qatar raised the equivalent of US$6.5 million for the "Renaissance of a Nation" endowment project of the IUMS.

== Views ==
In 2004, the International Association of Muslim Scholars ruled that resisting occupation troops in Iraq is a "duty" on all able Muslims whether they are in Iraq or outside Iraq and that aiding the occupier was impermissible.

In 2007, the International Union for Muslim Scholars caused controversy when it called for the destruction of the Shrine of Abu Lu'lu'a (located in Kashan, Iran), a suggestion which was not well received by some in Iran, having been perceived as a specifically anti-Iranian act.

In 2008, Mohammad Salim Al-Awa, secretary general of the IUMS opposed Egypt's birth control program, stating: "The state is not God and the state is not the creator. We should not try to limit the number of children."

In 2015, speaking about Hamas, the leader of IUMS stated, "We view Hamas from the perspective of the Palestinian cause, which must remain the pre-eminent cause not just for the union but for all Arabs, Muslims, and free humanitarians in the world. We stand against oppression, tyranny, displacement and detention tactics that Israeli occupation forces rely on; this is a humanitarian and an international stance. Hamas is defending the rights of the nation, and the nation must stand by those who defend its preeminent cause."

In 2015, after the Charlie Hebdo attacks, IUMS condemned the publication of a cartoon of Muhammad holding a "Je Suis Charlie" sign with the words, "all is forgiven" written below. The group appealed to Muslims to continue to protest but not to resort to violence.

In 2025, the International Union of Muslim Scholars issued a religious ruling legitimizing jihad against the "Zionist entity" and its allies involved in the war in Gaza. The ruling deems it a religious obligation, starting with the people of Palestine, then neighboring countries, and the broader Muslim world. It calls on governments to intervene militarily and economically, prohibits any support or cooperation with the enemy, and urges the formation of a unified Islamic military alliance.

IUMS condemned the Houthi coup in Yemen. They advised the Houthis to return home and to stop compromising the "legitimate government" of Yemen. They fully endorse the Saudi-led war in Yemen.

From a religious legal perspective IUMS says "one must stand with the legitimate government and cannot back a coup." They used this mentality to disagree with Saudi Arabia on the coup in Egypt and the ousting of Mohamed Morsi.

== International relations and diplomacy ==
On 13 June 2013, former IUMS official Abdullah Bin Bayyah met with Obama administration officials in Washington where he lobbied for help with the Syrian opposition forces. U.S. National Security Council official Gayle Smith asked for the meeting looking for "new mechanisms to communicate with you and the Association of Muslim Scholars". Bin Bayyah also met with Rashad Hussain, U.S. envoy to the Organisation of Islamic Cooperation.

The IUMS was designated a terrorist organization in the United Arab Emirates in 2014 over ties to the Muslim Brotherhood. The action was taken amid a controversy between Qatar and other GCC states, during which a number of states downgraded relations with Qatar and recalled their ambassadors as a result of Qatar's backing of the Muslim Brotherhood. The designation was met with skepticism by the United Kingdom and rejection by the United States and Norway. The IUMS rejected the designation and expressed "extreme astonishment of its inclusion by the UAE among the terrorists groups and rejects this description completely," said the group, which says it seeks to promote scholarship and awareness of Islam."

In 2022, the Kurdish prime minister Masrour Barzani congratulated Ali al-Qaradaghi on being elected to serve as Secretary General of IUMS and becoming the first Kurd to do so. The group has also formally met with dignitaries of Tajikistan, Uzbekistan and the Islamic Emirate of Afghanistan.

IUMS leadership has also works with senior Indonesian officials and met with members of the European parliament in the past.

== Controversies ==
=== Alleged terrorism support ===
Former IUMS leader al-Qaradawi was banned from traveling to the US and the UK because of his support for Hamas. British authorities specifically denied al-Qaradawi a visa due to his willingness to "justify acts of terrorist violence or disburse views that could foster intercommunity violence". The Union of Good, a charity group headed by Yusuf al-Qaradawi, was formally designated by the US State Department as a "foreign terrorist organization".

British media also reported that al-Qaradawi held shares in al-Taqwa, a bank which was listed as a "specially designated global terrorist" by the US. CNN said that al-Taqwa "was sending money to the likes of al Qaeda and Hamas through charitable fronts".

As a result of its alleged links with terrorism, several Arab countries listed IUMS as a terrorist organization. Qaradawi was issued an arrest warrant by an Egyptian court in 2012.

=== Affiliation with the Muslim Brotherhood ===
Reuters wrote that the IUMS was "formed in 2004 mostly by clerics belonging to the Muslim Brotherhood". An academic paper published by the Center for Security Policy, said that Yusuf al-Qaradawi was a "long time Muslim Brotherhood leader, who played a key role in the international spread of the Muslim Brotherhood abroad".

According to The Jerusalem Post, Yusuf al-Qaradawi is "a central figure affiliated with the Muslim Brotherhood", adding "many consider him the supreme religious and ideological authority for the Muslim Brotherhood, although he is not officially its leader". Matthew Levitt, former FBI official, said that "Qaradawi is one of the most public figureheads of the radical wing of the Muslim Brotherhood".

The IUMS was "formed in 2004 mostly by scholars belonging to the Muslim Brotherhood".

=== Israel ===
Israeli media stated that IUMS' founder Yusuf al-Qaradawi "has often made anti-Semitic remarks".

Within the context of the Gaza war, the IUMS issued a fatwa claiming that it is a duty for all Palestinians, neighboring states and all Muslim states to intervene militarily.

== Notable past and present figures ==
- Yusuf al-Qaradawi, former Chair
- Dr. Ali Mohieddin al-Qaradaghi, President
- Abdullah Bin Bayyah, Vice President
- Ahmed bin Mohammed al-Khalili (Grand Mufti of Oman), Vice President
- Ali Muhiuddin Al-Qurra Daghi, Secretary General
- Faisal Malawi
- Jamal Badawi
- Essam Al-Bashir
- Salman al-Ouda, who, as of September 2018, was Assistant Secretary of the IUMS according to a Saudi legal case against him.

== See also ==
- Ittihadul Ulema
