= Fatwa Council (United Arab Emirates) =

The Fatwa Council of the United Arab Emirates is a government body authorized in 2017 and established in 2018 which is responsible for licensing Islamic authorities to issue fatwas.

According to a government press release, "the Council will ensure that religious scholars advocate moderate Islam and eliminate any source of conflict among existing and future fatwa".
