= Ibrahim El-Zayat =

European Muslim activist in Germany

Ibrahim Farouk El-Zayat (Arabic: إبراهيم فاروق الزيات; born 1968 in Marburg Germany) is a European Muslim activist in Germany and has been a functionary in many Islamic organizations in Germany, Europe, and Saudi Arabia.

== Biography ==
Ibrahim El-Zayat is the son of Farouk El-Zayat, an Egyptian engineer who left Egypt in the 1960s and settled in Germany where he married a German convert to Islam and who lived in Marburg, a university town north of Frankfurt. Ibrahim grew up in Marburg where he attended the Martin-Luther-Schule (Gymnasium) in 1987. He studied industrial engineering and management, law, and economics in Marburg, Darmstadt and Cologne and wrote a thesis on the Islamic economics. El-Zayat married Sabiha Erbakan, the sister of Mehmet Sabri Erbakan, for many years the General Secretary of Millî Görüş in Germany.

== Islamic organizations ==
El-Zayat became head of the Islamic Community of Germany (Islamische Gemeinschaft in Deutschland; IGD) in January 2002, following the resignation of Ali Ghaleb Himmat, and served for the maximum two terms permitted, until January 2010.

El-Zayat also served as an officer in a variety of German, European, and Saudi Islamic youth organizations and was a member of a conservative political student organization. Following completion of his studies on Islamic economic systems in 1992, El-Zayat moved to Cologne and was involved with the founding of three Islamic youth organizations, and at one time had been a member of the Ring Christlich-Demokratischer Studenten, an organization describing itself as having "political convictions led by Christian Democratic, conservative and liberal values." He was also at one time the head of the Muslim Students Union, and from 1996 to 2002 he was the head of the Federation of Muslim Youth and Student Organizations (FEMYSO). El-Zayat has also been the European representative of the World Assembly of Muslim Youth (WAMY), a worldwide network of largely Saudi-funded youth groups"with headquarters in Saudi Arabia.

El-Zayat was a founder and director of the Federation of Islamic Organizations in Europe (FIOE), heading its public relations department, was a trustee of the Institut Européen des Sciences Humaines (IESH) at Chateau-Chinon / France. and a trustee of the Europe Trust.

In 1995, El-Zayat co-founded the "Gesellschaft Muslimischer Sozial- und Geisteswissenschaftler/Innen e.V." (GMSG).
