= Federation of Islamic Organizations in Europe =

Islamic organisation in Europe

- Founded: 1989
- Type: Umbrella organization
- Purpose: Representing and guiding all Muslims in Europe
- Headquarters: Brussels, Belgium
- Region served: Europe
- Website: eumuslims.org/en/home/

The Federation of Islamic Organizations in Europe (FIOE), now called the Council of European Muslims, is a European religious organization based in Brussels, Belgium. It was founded by the Muslim Brotherhood in 1989. FIOE subsequently created the European Council for Fatwa and Research, a pan European Muslim Brotherhood organisation which provides guidance to Muslims in Europe. According to its website, it has "hundreds of member organizations spread across 28 European States, all subscribing to a common belief in a methodology based on moderation and balance, which represents the tolerance of Islam" The FIOE has a headquarters office in Brussels and has had some success in positioning itself as a dialog partner for the EU and other important institutions. Funding for the FIOE is derived largely from Gulf sources, including the Mohammed bin Rashid Al Maktoum Foundation and the Waqf Ministry in Kuwait. In February 2014, the FIOE elected Abdallah Ben Mansour as its new president replacing Chakib Ben Makhlouf.

== Organization structure ==
In 2008 according to the EU Observer, FIOE represented some 29 Muslim organisations, mostly Sunni along with more than 1000 local groups among which were Muslim Association of Britain (MAB), Muslims of France (UOIF), and Islamic Community of Germany.

Federation of Islamic Organizations in Europe organisation structure in 2018:

Federation of Islamic; Organizations in Europe (FIOE)
European Council for Fatwa and Research (ECFR)	The Europe Trust	European Institute for Human Science (EIHS)	Muslims of Europe Charter
European Forum of Muslim Women (EFOMW)	28 Member organisations

== Activities ==
The FIOE was the sponsor of an initiative known as the Muslims of Europe Charter which was signed by more than four hundred Muslim organizations from all European countries and announced in Brussels in January 2008. A FIOE spokesman describe the document as "a message to government and the rest of society, but also directed at Muslims within Europe," "It describes how we should act as positive citizens in the societies in which we live and not be a threat." The document outlined 26 points which aimed at disconnecting links between Islam and violence as well as giving a definition of jihad.

In 2012, it published a eulogy for Holocaust denier Roger Garaudy on its homepage, whom it described as a "prominent thinker".

== Ties to Muslim Brotherhood ==
FIOE has been described by Lorenzo Vidino as "de facto, the overarching organization for new Western Muslim Brotherhood groups in Europe." According to Vidino, the FIOE founders and main members are new Western Muslim Brotherhood organizations such as the Union of Islamic Organisations of France the Islamic Community of Germany, and the Muslim Association of Britain (MAB) and that its board members include new Western Brothers such as Ahmed Jaballah and Ibrahim El-Zayat. In 2005, the FIOE President Ahmed Al-Rawi told the Wall Street Journal regarding the relationship of FIOE with the Muslim Brotherhood, "We are interlinked with them with a common point of view," he said. "We have a good close relationship." Ayman Aly, the FIOE Secretary-General, is a senior member of the Guidance Bureau of the Egyptian Muslim Brotherhood as well as a former adviser to the deposed Egyptian President Mohammed Morsi.

According to a US organization, the FIOE also has ties to Hamas and Hamas fund-raising organizations
