= Mairbek Vatchagaev =

Chechen historian and political analyst (born 1965)

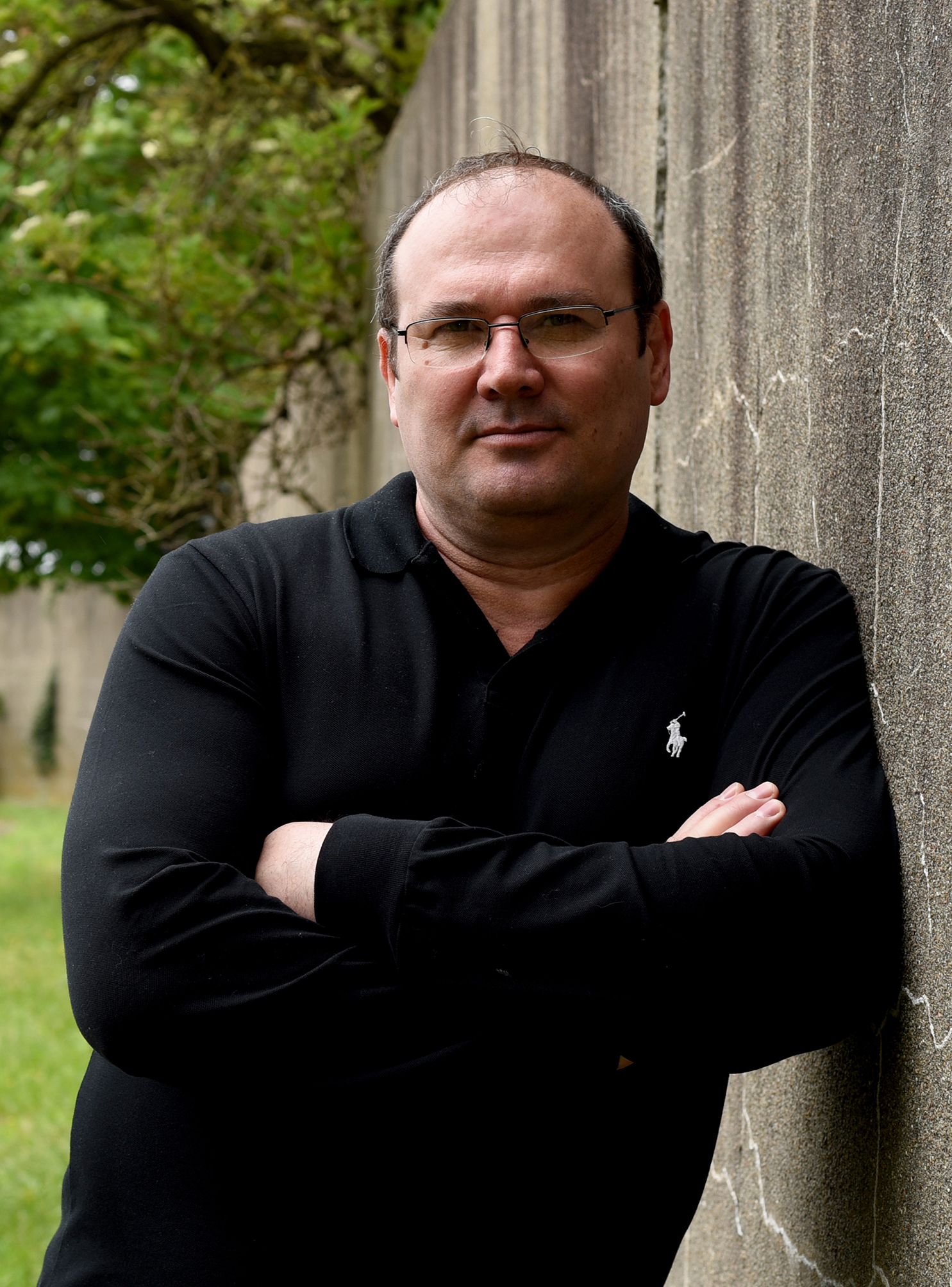
- Born: 17 December 12, 1965; Avtury, USSR

Mairbek Vatchagaev (born 1965) is a historian and political analyst on the North Caucasus. Mairbek Vatchagaev was a senior ranking official in the Chechen government of Aslan Maskhadov.

== Career ==
Vatchagaev was born in Russian SSR of USSR. He studied history at the Chechen State University, the Research Institute of Chechnya, and the Institute of the Russian History. He defended his doctoral thesis in the Russian Academy of Sciences in Moscow in 1995.

After receiving his doctoral degree, Vatchagaev returned to Chechnya and was placed in charge of the information department of the armed forces of Ichkeria. He worked closely with Aslan Maskhadov, and actively campaigned for him in 1996 before the elections. Together with Turpal Ali Atgeriev, Vatchagaev significantly assisted Maskhadov’s advance to power.

During the period 1998–99, Vatchagaev was a press secretary and first adviser to President Maskhadov. At the same time, he was in charge of leading the investigation center functioning under the presidential administration of Ichkeria. In the summer of 1999, Vatchagaev was appointed as the general representative of the Republic of Ichkeria in the Russian Federation. On October 21, 1999, the Russian police detained him. Vatchagaev spent 9 months in the Butyrsk prison in Moscow. Amnesty International declared him to be a political prisoner. He was released in the summer of 2000. Vatchagaev continued to function as a press secretary of President Maskhadov until 2002.

== Scholarly work ==
Vatchagaev has been studying the history of the North Caucasus and political processes in the region, as well as the history of Islam in Russia since 2002. He has published numerous articles on the history of Chechnya and politics in the North Caucasus and Russia.

He has extensively contributed to the Jamestown publication Eurasia Daily Monitor about developments in the North Caucasus.

Vatchagaev is an author of five books on the history and religion of the North Caucasus, including Chechnya in the 19th Century Caucasian Wars :

- Vatchagaev, M. and Mazaev T.] (100 Days of a President) (St. Petersburg-Grozny), 1997, 44 pages (in Russian).
- L’aigle et le loup. Paris, Buchet Chastel, 2008, 258 pages (in French).
- Chechnya in the Caucasian Wars of the 19th Century), Kiev, Ukraine, 2003 (in Russian), 367 pages.
- Sheikhs and Holy Places of Chechnya, Moscow, 2009. Pages 304 (in Russian
- Vatchagaev, M. Mamulia G and Donogo XM [Вачагаев М, Мамулиа Г и Доного Х-М. Гайдар Баммат и журнал "Кавказ"], Маkhachkala, Dagestan, Russian Federation, 2010. Pages 448 (in Russian)

He is the co-editor-in-chief of the Caucasus Survey (London, UK). He also co-edits an online magazine Prometheus (Paris, France). Vatchagaev is the Président de l'Association d'études caucasiennes (Paris, France).
