= Youssef Nada =

Egyptian businessman (1931–2024)

- Born: 17 May 1931; Alexandria, Egypt
- Died: 22 December 2024 (aged 93); Switzerland
- Movement: Muslim Brotherhood

Youssef Moustafa Ali Nada (Arabic: يوسف مصطفى علي ندا; 17 May 1931 – 22 December 2024) was an Egyptian businessman and Muslim Brotherhood financial strategist. Nada is most famous for raising successful European human rights legal cases to defend himself against accusations of terrorism by the United States. The U.S. accusations, made directly after the 9/11 attacks, resulted in his placement on the United Nations Security Council Resolution 1267 terror blacklist.

In 2001, Nada, former chairman of al Taqwa Bank, was placed on the UN terror list by the U.S. Treasury Department. Nada was alleged to have financed activities of al Qaeda, charges Nada vehemently denied. The U.S. accusation was made applicable under the UN terror-listing program and affected his life in Switzerland, notably his assets, reputation, honor, and ability to move freely. In 2006, he sued the Swiss government for restitution of financial losses due to the Swiss investigation.

By 2009, both the Swiss and Italian investigations of Nada were dropped as no evidence was found to support the U.S. accusations. Both Switzerland and Italy petitioned the UN Terrorism Committee to remove Nada's name from the United Nations Security Council Resolution 1267 blacklist, at the objection of the United States. The U.S. finally acquiesced to his removal on 24 September 2009, but retained Nada on the domestic U.S. Treasury list under Executive Order 13224 until 25 February 2015 when it also removed his name from its own sanctions list.

While the United States refused to disclose evidence of Nada's guilt, claiming that the evidence was classified, it removed his name from all its lists silently with little fanfare in 2015.

Between 2007 and 2009, Nada's ordeal featured heavily in a report by Swiss Senator and former Prosecutor Dick Marty on behalf of the Parliamentary Assembly of the Council of Europe. Marty's report assessed the UN's terror-blacklisting procedures against international rule of law standards – along with those for a similar blacklist run by the European Union – and concluded that both were "completely arbitrary" and violated human rights.

In 2008, Nada raised a case against Switzerland at the European Court of Human Rights in Strasbourg, also a body of the Council of Europe.

On 12 September 2012, the European Court of Human Rights ruled in favor of Nada, citing that Nada's human rights had been violated, in the context of the European Convention on Human Rights. In this ruling the government of Switzerland was ordered to pay Nada €30,000 in damages, for their treatment of him as a person placed – with no evidence of guilt – on the United Nations Security Council Resolution 1267 terror blacklist by the United States.

== Early life and education ==
Youssef Nada was born on 17 May 1931 in Alexandria, Egypt. In his late teens, Nada became affiliated with the Muslim Brotherhood.

Between 1952 and 1954, Nada was imprisoned with 300,000 members of the Muslim Brotherhood in a desert-based Egyptian military concentration camp. Many persons imprisoned in this camp were tortured as a result of Gamal Abdel-Nasser's famous campaign against the group. After his release, Nada returned to University in Alexandria and began a business with a friend, producing milk.

== Career ==
In the late 1950s, Nada moved to Europe, settling in Austria, and began working with a cheese factory in Graz. In 1961, a close friend of Nada's invited him to Libya where a construction boom was developing. Nada seized on the occasion and started to spend his time between Libya and Austria. In a matter of a few years he became the largest supplier of cement to the North African country. The activity led him to partner with Cementir, the Italian cement maker, to develop in 1965 the world's first floating cement silos, two barges named GI-1 and GD-2 able to store bulk cement and loaded with bagging facilities. Cement soon became his main business along with smaller operations in other commodities ranging from steel to agricultural materials. Nada had tremendous business success in his ventures with Saudi Arabia, Libya and eventually, the Nigerian government.

During the 1960s, the Egyptian government fell back into conflict with the Muslim Brotherhood. Nada became one of the members wanted by the Egyptians. This led to Nada settling permanently in Europe.

By 2001, the time of the accusations for which he became famous, Nada was a resident of Italy. He lived in Campione, a small Italian 'enclave' adjacent to the Swiss canton of Ticino. The road to enter his property, and home, crossed through Switzerland. This is why his being banned from Swiss territory placed him in a state of virtual house arrest for a number of years. It explains why the Swiss SECO made it legal entanglements with the Swiss government inevitable.

== Personal life and death ==
Nada has a son Hazim Nada, born in Silver Spring, Maryland, who founded a commodities-trading business in 2008 to support his studies. He became victim of a United Arab Emirates funded smear campaign by a Geneva-based private intelligence firm named Alp Services of Mario Brero, exposed in a March 2023 article in the New Yorker. The scheme funded the spreading of allegations that his business was a cover for a Muslim Brotherhood cell through paid journalists and co-consiprators, such as Sylvain Besson and Africa Intelligence, which prompted World-Check to flag him, pushing, amongst other means as well, banks to stop servicing him, eventually destroying his business.

Nada died in Switzerland on 22 December 2024, at the age of 93.

== Claims about Nada ==
=== Meeting in Algeria ===
A 1986 article in London-based Asharq Al-Awsat reported that Nada, along with Ahmed Ben Bella, a former president of Algeria, held a secret meeting at his Switzerland home attended by "major figures in some of the world’s most violent groups." Other attendees of the meeting included the "Blind Sheikh" Omar Abdel-Rahman and Sayyed Mohammad Hussein Fadlallah, a leading Lebanese Shi'ite Muslim scholar.

In an interview on al-Jazeera, Nada himself vehemently denied any such thing to have occurred citing that well-known hatred between the individuals made such a meeting implausible. Nada claimed further that the London-based newspaper which made the allegations had links to Arab governments opposed to the Muslim Brotherhood.

=== "The Project" ===
In a November 2001 raid on offices and residences associated with Youssef Nada, journalist Sylvain Besson, who Nada accused of targeting him with nefarious conspiracies, claims that an untitled document, written in Arabic and dated 1 December 1982, ostensibly outlining a plan to infiltrate and defeat Western countries was found. Later referred to as "The Project" by the Swiss-French journalist. While the document itself has no mention whatsoever of the Muslim Brotherhood and is neither proved to have come from Nada's house (see Nada's interview at Al-Jazeera Shahed Ala Al-Asr), as claimed by the conspiracy theory of the book, the author adds the title the Project to such document and concludes on his own inferencing that it is to be deemed a Muslim Brotherhood document. Nada totally disputed both the document and the conspiracies (see Al-Jazeera Bila Hudud interviews).

=== Nada's rebuttal ===
Nada said that the aforementioned stories were fabrications, made for political purposes. This is a claim at least partly supported by the findings of the Swiss and Italian investigations, which cited that the accusations against him appeared to have political roots.

Beyond this, Nada says that from mid-1997, numerous western journalists appeared to be acting in the service of various foreign intelligence agencies in the Middle East, supporting claims that benefitted certain regimes in the Arab world and that such journalists knew well were false. The names he focuses on are Sylvain Besson, Guido Olimpio, Richard Labaviere, Mark Hosenball, Michael Isikof and Victor Comras, Lorenzo Vidino all journalists who have pushed defamatory allegations against Nada and which were found baseless by all the authorities who investigated them.

== Terror investigations ==
=== Swiss and Italian investigation, 2001–2005 ===
Although the claims against him were made by the United States, the nature of the UN terror sanctions program made Nada's treatment as a terror suspect international. Therefore, most of the actions taken in his direction were in the hands of Swiss and Italian authorities, due to his residential and business linkages to the two countries.

In November 2001, the Swiss government froze 24 bank accounts associated with Nada, and the Swiss federal prosecutor's office, led by Claude Nicati, began an aggressive inquiry into the activities of Nada and Taqwa co-director Ali Ghaleb Himmat. Both men repeatedly denied any connection with Osama bin Laden and his al-Qaeda network.

Ultimately the Federal Court in Bellinzona ordered the prosecutor to close the investigations, having produced no evidence to support any form of charges.

=== Swiss and Italy drop investigation, ask UN to remove his terror-listing ===
On 1 June 2005, the Swiss case was dropped due to lack of evidence. The Prosecutor was admonished by the Court for opening a file on Nada without any specific reason. The Italian case was closed in 2007, after a lengthy investigation whereby the Prosecutor stated that the grounds for opening the case appeared to be more political and agenda-driven rather than judicial or evidence based. Italian premier newspaper Corriere della Sera reported on this.

Both the Swiss and Italian governments petitioned the Committee of the United Nations in-charge of the United Nations Security Council Resolution 1267 terror blacklist.

In 2009, Nada was removed from the United Nations Security Council Resolution 1267 terror blacklist (UNSC 1267).

=== Tried in absentia in Egyptian military trial ===
In January and February 2007, Egypt announced it had frozen the assets of dozens of top Muslim Brotherhood figures, warning that at least 40 persons were to stand trial in Egypt's military court. The Associated Press notes this court is "known for its swift trials and no right of appeal."

In April 2008, an Egyptian military tribunal sentenced Nada in absentia to ten years' imprisonment for providing financial support to the Muslim Brotherhood.

In his 2008 filings at the European Court of Human Rights, Nada claims he had not been informed of the proceedings against him and that he had therefore never had the possibility of defending himself in person nor of sending a lawyer to represent him. Nada noted that the trial was held before a military tribunal even though he was a civilian, and therefore called the proceedings into question as being an unfair trial.

=== Parliamentary Assembly of the Council of Europe inquiry ===
A 2007 report for the Parliamentary Assembly of the Council of Europe (PACE) by Swiss Senator Dick Marty described the Nada case as being "like a page out of Kafka". Investigations of the case, and the injustices suffered by Nada, who has never been proven to have any links to Al Qaeda, nor the Taliban, were the focal point of a two-year PACE human rights investigation. During this investigation, the UN SC 1276, and other UN terror-blacklisting programs, came under harsh scrutiny and criticism. The PACE report summarised the situation in these terms:

"Even the members of the committee which decides on blacklisting are not given all the reasons for blacklisting particular persons or groups. Usually, those persons or groups are not told that blacklisting has been requested, given a hearing or even, in some cases, informed of the decision — until they try to cross a frontier or use a bank account. There is no provision for independent review of these decisions".

PACE concluded that then (and still current) terror blacklisting procedures were unworthy of the UN and EU. Criticisms were levied stating that these kind of injustices did not help to fight terrorism, but to promote popular frustrations by persecuting persons without justice and transparency.

In 2010, PACE's rapporteur made a third-party submission to the European Court of Human Rights in support of Nada's case against Switzerland (see below), which was ultimately successful.

=== European Court of Human Rights ruling ===
On 12 September 2012, the European Court of Human Rights decided that Switzerland had violated two Articles of the European Convention on Human Rights and Fundamental Freedoms, aka "The Convention", in particular articles 8 and 13. The court ruled that Switzerland violated Nada's human rights by restricting his cross-border movements after the United States put Nada on a blacklist on suspicion of financing terrorism.

The United States had accused Nada of helping finance the 9/11 terrorist attacks, placing him on the United Nations Security Council Resolution 1267 terror blacklist, a sanctions list for persons associated with Al Qaeda and the Taliban. The United States refused to provide evidence to support the accusation, claiming the information was classified. Still, the terror-blacklisting left Nada in a position of being treated as a criminal, without trial, nor with any means of appeal.

The Strasbourg court ruled that "Switzerland should have taken all possible measures, within the latitude available to it, to adapt the sanctions regime to the applicant's individual situation". Switzerland was ordered to pay Nada €30,000 to cover his costs and expenses.

The decision was seminal, as it made clear that the Convention was required to be upheld, in relation to persons subject to UN terror-blacklisting, under UN SC 1267.

== Sources ==
- Thompson, Douglas; Youssef Nada (2012). Inside the Muslim Brotherhood: The Truth about the World's Most Powerful Political Movement. London: John Blake Publishing. ISBN 978-1857826876. (authorized biography of Nada)
