= Al Taqwa Bank =

Bank in The Bahamas, Switzerland, and Liechtenstein

- Founded: 1988

The Al Taqwa Bank (occasionally Bank al Taqwa or simply Al Taqwa) is a financial institution incorporated in 1988. It is based out of The Bahamas, Switzerland, and Liechtenstein. The Bank was accused by the United States of having links to Islamist terror organizations, alleging that it was a major source of funds for the operations of Osama bin Laden and his associates. Al Taqwa bank was subsequently placed on a list of entities and individuals associated with Al Qaeda that is maintained by the UN Security Council. On August 2, 2010, the bank was removed from the list. None of the key individuals affiliated with the bank have ever been charged of any crime, whether by the United States or any other government.

== History ==
The Al Taqwa (Arabic for "piety") network of financial companies was set up in 1988 by prominent members of the Muslim Brotherhood, most notably Al Taqwa's chairman and co-founder, Youssef Nada. Later, Ahmed Huber, a vocal admirer of the Muslim Brotherhood, was hired because the company needed at least one Swiss citizen on its board. Another co-founder was François Genoud, one of the key managers of Nazi assets after the second world war who later attained notoriety as the publisher of Joseph Goebbels' diaries.

Al Taqwa Bank was targeted early on by the United States because of its known links to Osama Bin Laden's family. The U.S. also targeted it because its allegedly terror-related funds indirectly filter through the banking system of the United States, through its use of correspondent accounts, to various terror organizations around the world. At the time Al Taqwa Bank assets were frozen it held $220m of money destined to allegedly fund terror activity against the West, such accounts with the Swiss Banca del Gottardo, which in turn holds correspondent accounts with Citibank and the Bank of New York.

== Allegations of connections to terrorist financing ==
In 2001, authorities in the Bahamas cancelled Al Taqwa's bank license there due to its involvements in finance of Islamic terror organizations using new laws designed to crack down on money laundering. These laws would require Al Taqwa to maintain a physical presence in that country, which the Bahamas would not be able to give to a suspected terror bank. Later that year, Al Taqwa offices in Switzerland and Liechtenstein, along with the homes of Youssef Nada, Ahmed Huber, and one other Taqwa director, were raided by law enforcement agencies after being put on the Bush administration's "terrorist financiers" watch list.

Jordan accused the Al Taqwa bank of providing financial aid to the Jordanian organizations of Khader Abu Ghoshar and Abu Musab al-Zarqawi involved in plotting terrorist attacks on tourists during Jordan's "Millennium Celebration".

== U.S. and Swiss investigations ==
In 2002, the United States Treasury Department contacted the Swiss government by letter in an effort to convince authorities that Al Taqwa Bank had set up a special line of credit for Al Qaeda financial kingpin Mamdouh Mahmoud Salim to finance terrorist attacks by various terrorist organizations, including Al Qaeda and Hamas. The communique stated that Al Taqwa Bank used secret accounts, convoluted real estate transactions, and other financial methods of obscuring the flow of money to funnel cash directly to organizations that would use the funds for terrorist attacks. Money would allegedly flow from Kuwait and the UAE into Al Taqwa offices in Lugano and Malta, where Al Taqwa provided "indirect investment services for Al Qaeda, investing funds for bin Laden, and making cash deliveries on request to the Al Qaeda organization."

These letters were intended to convince the Swiss to take legal action against banking operations the U.S. government considered suspect (Youssef Nada was himself based in Switzerland). These appeals had apparently been going on since the mid-1990s; Swiss banking officials knew of the reports of Al Taqwa Bank's connections to terrorism, but did not have the evidence to take official action, due to Switzerland's strict banking-secrecy laws and the lack of transparency inherent in traditional hawala banking.

This drama played out largely away from public scrutiny. However, in 2002 the semi-secret intergovernmental letters were obtained by an American lawyer involved in a class-action suit against supposed terrorist financiers and subsequently entered into the public record.

== Official response to allegations ==
Al Taqwa's board of directors, none of whom have ever been charged in any criminal case by the United States or any other government, have consistently denied any connection to the financing of terrorism.

== See also ==
- Al-Barakat
