= Fiqh al-aqallīyāt =

Concept of principles of islamic jurisprundence for minorities

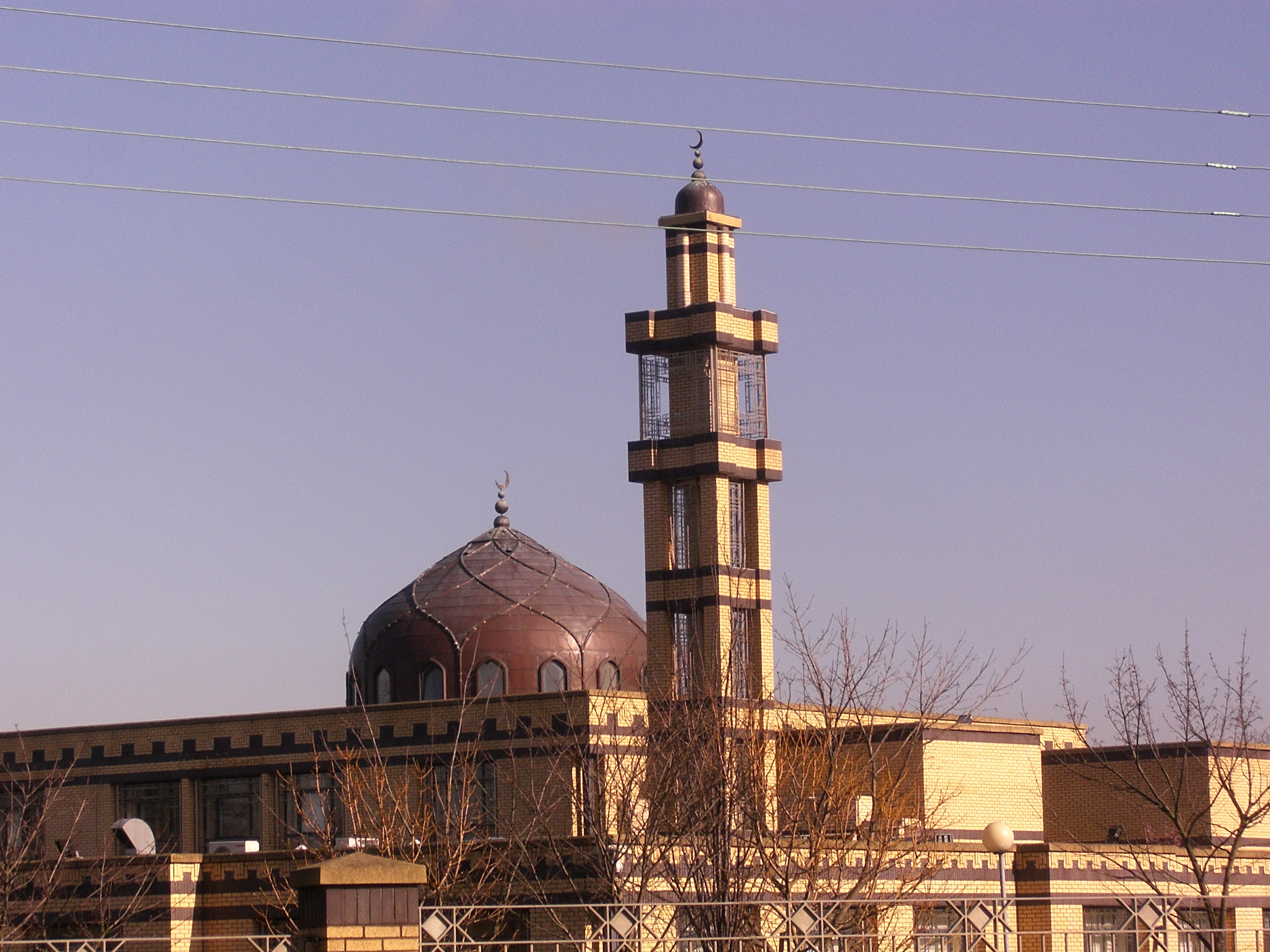
The Islamic Cultural Center of Ireland in Dublin, where the European Council for Fatwa and Research, oriented towards fiqh al-aqallīyāt, is based.

Fiqh al-aqallīyāt (Arabic فقه الأقليات "jurisprudence of minorities, minority fiqh") is a concept of principles of Islamic jurisprudence that has been discussed since the late 1990s, particularly among Arabic-speaking Muslims. It aims to develop a new system of Islamic behavioral norms that offers solutions for the specific ethical and religious problems of Muslim minorities living in Western countries by drawing on Ijtihad, i.e. finding norms through independent judgment. Tāhā Jābir al-ʿAlwānī (1935–2016), the founder and former chairman of the Fiqh Council of North America (FCNA), played a leading role in developing the concept. He coined the term and created one of the first program writings on fiqh al-aqallīyāt in 2000. According to al-ʿAlwānī, the minority fiqh is intended to help "overcome the psychological and spiritual division experienced by Muslim minorities, especially in the West, by making them a partner in these societies in happiness and unhappiness."

In 1999, the concept was adopted by the European Council for Fatwa and Research (ECFR) under the leadership of Yūsuf al-Qaradāwī. Al-Qaradāwī published his own book on minority fiqh in 2001, in which he argued that the minority status of Muslims living in Western countries necessitated certain normative relaxations that would otherwise be forbidden for Muslims. He described "integration without assimilation" as one of the goals of minority fiqh. Since that time, the concept has been the subject of transnational Islamic debate. Persistent criticism of the concept, particularly of the social and political implications of the underlying concept of minorities, led its original proponents to use the term fiqh al-aqallīyāt only rarely and to focus more on the question of how the modern concept of citizenship fits in with the Islamic system of norms and Islamic identity.

== The path to Fiqh al-aqallīyāt ==
=== Prehistory: Islamic scholars and muslim minorities ===
Yūsuf al-Qaradāwī in the 1960s

Although fiqh al-aqallīyāt is a relatively new concept, Islamic legal scholars have dealt with the living situation of Muslims in non-Muslim majority societies before and produced fatwas for them. At the beginning of the 20th century, the Syro-Egyptian Sheikh Rashīd Ridā (1865–1935) produced numerous fatwas for Muslims living in a minority situation. They appeared in his well-known pan-Islamic journal al-Manār, which was published in Cairo between 1898 and 1935. Both thematically and in terms of their madhhab critics and utilitarian orientation, these fatwas are similar to today's fiqh al-aqallīyāt. For example, similar to the later advocates of minority fiqh, Ridā held the view that Muslims are not obliged to emigrate to Islamic territory if they are able to practice their religion in non-Islamic territory.

Another scholar who dealt with Muslim minorities early on was Yūsuf al-Qaradāwī. In the 1960s, he published his book The Permitted and the Forbidden in Islam on behalf of the Sheikh of Azhar, specifically for Muslims in Western countries. At the end of the 1970s, research on Muslim minorities was carried out at Arab universities, particularly at King Abdulaziz University in Jeddah. At the same time, the Muslim World League in Mecca and the World Assembly of Muslim Youth also began to deal with Muslim minorities.

Taha Jabir al-Alwani, an Iraqi scholar who had written a dissertation on Usūl al-fiqh at Azhar in 1973 and had been working at the Imam Mohammad Ibn Saud Islamic University since 1975, also began to deal with Muslim minorities in the West during this time. The reason for this was that his university was given the task of preparing Saudi students who were sent to study in the US for their stay there. When al-ʿAlwānī was invited to the US by the Muslim Students' Association in 1976, leading representatives of this organization suggested that he prepare a study on the teaching of norms for Muslim minorities. At the time, he actually wrote a text on ''Ibādāt - the acts of worship -'' but was unable to complete it for a long time.

=== Establishment of Fiqh bodies in western countries ===
Similarly, from the 1970s onwards, Muslims living in the West began to make efforts themselves to find Sharia-compliant solutions to the everyday problems of Muslim minorities. According to Zakī Badawī, he founded the United Kingdom Shari'ah Council, the London Islamic Shari'ah Council, with other imams in the UK for this purpose in 1978.

Moving to the United States in 1983, Tāhā al-ʿAlwānī began similar efforts in North America when he joined the staff of the International Institute of Islamic Thought (IIIT) in Herndon, Virginia, in 1984. In 1985, he began collecting questions that were on the minds of the Muslim community in the U.S. at the time, with the goal of submitting them to the newly formed International Islamic Fiqh Academy for answers. However, since the deliberations there were extremely slow, and al-ʿAlwānī found the answers he finally received to be very unsatisfactory because of their conservative orientation, he became convinced that it was necessary to develop a doctrine of norms for the Muslim minorities himself. In 1988, he was appointed chairman of the newly formed Fiqh Council of North America, whose mission, according to its bylaws, was "to develop a Fiqh for Muslims living in non-Islamic countries''. During this time, Al-ʿAlwānī himself prepared a study on the acceptance of citizenship by Muslims in non-Muslim states.

From 1992, the french Union des organisations islamiques de France (UOIF, Union of Islamic Organizations of France) and its affiliated Federation of Islamic Organizations in Europe (FIOE) held seminars on Islamic law. In 1997, the FIOE founded the European Council for Fatwa and Research (ECFR). The task of this Dublin-based body was to develop a doctrine of norms for Muslims living in Europe that would be up-to-date and take into account time, place, custom and living conditions. The committee was headed by Yūsuf al-Qaradāwī. During this time, he was already dealing a lot with the issues of Muslim minorities, for example in the program The Sharia and Life broadcast every Sunday evening on the Arabic television channel Al Jazeera Media Network and on the website IslamOnline, which he maintained and which dealt a lot with Muslim minorities in the West and East.

=== Emergence and spread of the idea of Fiqh al-aqallīyāt ===
Al-ʿAlwānī was the first to use the term fiqh al-aqallīyāt, however, in 1994, when the FCNA issued a fatwa under his leadership stating that American Muslims are allowed to actively participate in elections. In a discussion at IIIT that same year, he described fiqh al-aqallīyāt as a new name for what was formerly known in the Maliki school of jurisprudence as the "jurisprudence of incidents" (fiqh an-nawāzil), which dealt with the normative judgment of specific incidents.

Yusuf Talal DeLorenzo, the secretary of the Fiqh Council of North America, elaborated on the idea of continuity of fiqh al-aqallīyāt to fiqh an-nawāzil in an essay in 1998, stating: "Since the traditional fiqh of Islam is essentially the fiqh of the historical Muslim state and its Muslim majority, it pays no attention to the fiqh of Muslim minorities, except in the form of the nawāzil issued in various times of crisis, such as during the Mongol invasions, the Crusades or during the Morisco period of Andalusian history."

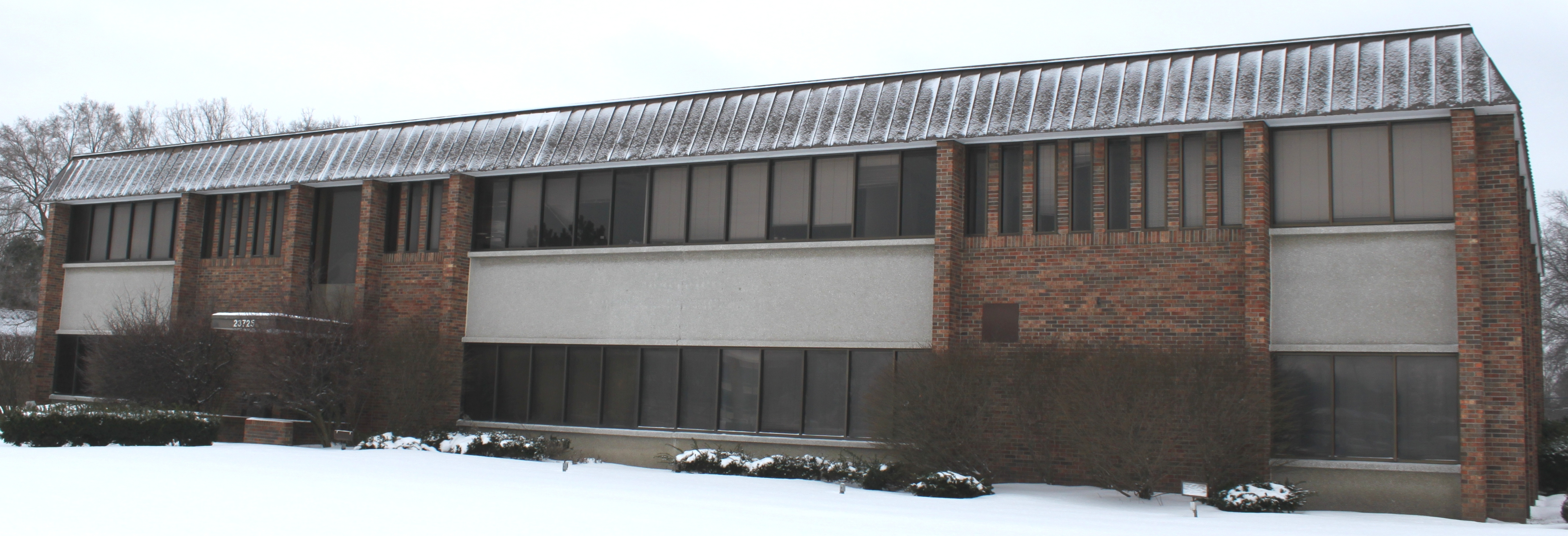
The Islamic American University in Southfield

When the Graduate School of Islamic and Social Sciences (GSISS) was founded in Ashburn, Virginia, in 1996, al-ʿAlwānī ensured that minority fiqh was included as a compulsory subject in the curriculum. Nadia Mahmud Mustafa, an Egyptian professor of political science affiliated with IIIT, developed a course on the "Political Jurisprudence of Muslim Minorities" (al-fiqh as-siyāsī li-l-aqallīyāt al-muslima) for the United Arab Emirates University. Later, minority fiqh also became a subject at the private Islamic American University in Southfield, Michigan.

In 1997, the concept of fiqh al-aqallīyāt was already so widespread in Arab countries that the al-Jazeera television channel dedicated a separate episode of its popular program The Sharia and Life to it in November of that year. Yūsuf al-Qaradāwī, who was invited to this show as a guest as he usually is, was still skeptical of the term at the time and preferred the term fiqh al-ightirāb ("jurisprudence of life in a foreign land"). However, when he published the first fatwa collection of the ECFR in 1999, he no longer had any problems with this concept. In the preface to this collection, he used it to justify the existence of the ECFR as a separate fiqh body alongside the major Islamic fiqh academies such as the Islamic Research Academy in Cairo, the Fiqh Academy of the Organization of the Islamic Conference in Jeddah and the Fiqh Academy of the Muslim World League: the ECFR, he said, does not compete with these bodies, but only complements them in a special field of the doctrine of norms, namely fiqh al-aqallīyāt.

In the following years, the ECFR became one of the most important forums for the discussion and dissemination of the various concepts of minority fiqh. In 2004, after several books on minority fiqh had already been published, the ECFR acknowledged the legitimacy (mašrūʿīya) of this concept in its journal and declared that it would use it as a methodological basis for normative ijtihād on both a theoretical and practical level.

== The first elaborations of the concept ==
=== Tūbūlyāk (1997) and ʿAbd al-Qādir (1997/1998) ===
Attempts to develop a doctrine of norms for Muslim minorities were also made in the 1990s in the form of academic qualification papers submitted to the Sharia faculties of universities in Morocco, Saudi Arabia and Lebanon. Their authors were students who came from Europe or had a special interest in Europe. In 1996, the Bosnian scholar Sulaimān Muhammad Tūbūlyāk defended a master's thesis entitled "The Political Rules for Muslim Minorities in Islamic Jurisprudence" (al-Aḥkām as-siyāsīya li-l-aqalliyāt al-muslima fī l-fiqh al-islāmī) at the Faculty of Law at the University of Jordan. In it, he rejected the Malikite view that Muslims were obliged to emigrate from non-Islamic areas and advocated the view already held by Rashīd Ridā that Muslims should be allowed to continue living among unbelievers as long as they were allowed to practice their religion there. Tūbūlyāk's book was published in Amman and Beirut in 1997.

The book entitled "From the Jurisprudence of Muslim Minorities" (Min fiqh al-aqallīyāt al-muslima) by the Lebanese scholar Chālid Muhammad ʿAbd al-Qādir (b. 1961), which was published in 1997 by the Qatari Ministry of Religion in the renowned series Kitāb al-Umma, had a similar orientation. It is the first book to include the term fiqh al-aqallīyāt in its title. ʿAbd al-Qādir is a former student of Yūsuf al-Qaradāwī and studied with him in Qatar. The book is an abridged version of the master's thesis that ʿAbd al-Qādir wrote in 1994 at the Imam al-Auzāʿī University in Beirut. In 2003, the Egyptian Ministry of Religion published an English translation of the short version of the text.

A long version of ʿAbd al-Qādir's dissertation was published in Lebanon in 1998 under the title "Jurisprudence of Muslim Minorities" (Fiqh al-aqallīyāt al-muslima). The book is divided into three chapters, the first of which describes international relations (pp. 18–187), the second the rules for acts of worship and mosques (pp. 189–363) and the third social relations (pp. 365–680). The individual chapters consist of a series of answers to questions of concern to Muslim minorities, such as the regulation of ritual prayer and financial transactions in the minority situation. The question of the purity of dogs and infidels, the combination of ritual prayers and marriage to a non-Muslim, and the question of fasting during extremely long day lengths in the polar regions are also addressed.

=== Tāhā Dschābir al-ʿAlwānī (1999/2000) ===
Although ʿAbd al-Qādir's book dealt with various individual issues related to the permanent residence of Muslims in non-Islamic countries, it did not deal with the concept of minority fiqh itself. This concept received its first theoretical elaboration in al-ʿAlwānī's essay Madḫal ilā Fiqh al-aqallīyāt ("Introduction to Minority Jurisprudence"), which was published in the winter of 1999/2000 in the journal Islāmīyat al-maʿrifa ("The Islamization of Knowledge"), published by the IIIT. The short text was subsequently republished several times in various modifications, for example in June 2000 in Egypt in a book series dedicated to "Islamic enlightenment" under the title Fī fiqh al-aqallīyāt al-muslima ("On the Fiqh of Muslim Minorities"). A year later, an abridged version was published on the Arabic website Islamonline.net under the title Naẓarāt taʾasīsīya fī fiqh al-aqallīyat ("Basic Reflections on the Fiqh of Minorities"). The Kuwaiti scholar ʿUjail Jāsim an-Nashamī, who is himself a member of the ECFR, dedicated a critical commentary to al-ʿAlwānī's program, which was published in the ECFR's journal in 2005.

Al-ʿAlwānī's text has also been translated into English, French and Russian. The English translation, to which Zakī Badawī wrote a preface, was published by IIIT in 2003 under the title "Towards a Fiqh for Minorities. Some Basic Reflections". In a newly added introduction, al-ʿAlwānī refers to the shock that the attacks of 11 September 2001 caused among Muslims and Americans and emphasizes that the need for a new fiqh for Muslim minorities in the West has become greater than ever before.

=== Dschamāl ad-Dīn ʿAtīya (2000/2001) ===
Another contribution to the topic was the essay "Towards a New Minority Fiqh" (Naḥwa fiqh ǧadīd li-l-aqallīyāt) by the Egyptian legal thinker Jamāl ad-Dīn ʿAtīya Muhammad (1928–2017), published in 2000/2001. It was republished as a separate book in 2003. This essay is an exception in that it deals not only with Muslim minorities outside Islamic countries, but with religious, ethnic, linguistic and cultural minorities in general.

=== Yūsuf al-Qaradāwī (2001) ===
In 2001, Yūsuf al-Qaradāwī published his own book on minority fiqh entitled "On the Jurisprudence of Muslim Minorities: The Life of Muslims in the Other Societies" (Fī fiqh al-aqallīyāt al-muslima: ḥayāt al-muslimīn fī l-muǧtamaʿāt al-uḫrā). As he himself writes in the preface, he was responding to the request of the General Secretariat of the Muslim World League, which had asked him to write a book on the normative problems of Muslim minorities in the West. In the preface, al-Qaradāwī also situates his publication in the previous debates on Islamic law in the West and emphasizes his own earlier commitment to Muslim minorities. However, this diverse scholarly activity on behalf of Muslim minorities requires a sharia law foundation "that traces the individual regulations back to their foundations and the particulars to the universals and establishes the rules that are necessary to define a scholarly methodology for this Fiqh."

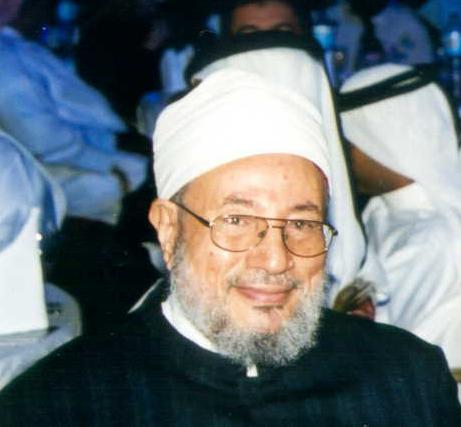
Yūsuf al-Qaradāwī

The first part of the book, which consists of a theoretical presentation of the problems of Muslim minorities and their solution through minority fiqh, comprises three chapters. The first is devoted to Muslim minorities and their problems with regard to the Islamic doctrine of norms (pp. 15–29). The second chapter deals with the seven objectives and various features and sources of minority fiqh (pp. 30–39). Al-Qaradāwī presents his book here as a response to questions from Muslims in the West who asked him for a systematic treatise on the norms of Muslim minorities in non-Muslim societies. In his view, these minorities outside Dār al-Islām, i.e. the areas outside Islamic rule, require a special doctrine of norms because "they are forced to act according to the rules and laws of that society, even though some of them contradict the Sharia of Islam." In a separate section (p. 34f.), al-Qaradāwī names seven goals for the minority fiqh he is striving for. In the third chapter, he discusses nine basic pillars (rakāʾiz asāsīya), which the minority fiqh must take into account more than any other fiqh (pp. 40–60).

The second part of the book, which takes up almost two thirds (pp. 61–188), consists of examples of the application of minority fiqh in the form of a collection of 15 fatwas. Here, Al-Qarādāwī addresses individual issues and problems faced by Muslims in non-Muslim societies and shows how solutions can be developed in accordance with the methodological guidelines he mentioned earlier. The fatwas are divided into four subject areas (1. principles of faith and acts of worship, 2. family law, 3. food and drink, 4. dealing with the non-Muslim environment) and vary greatly in length. The fourth topic deals in great detail with the question of whether it is permissible for Muslims to buy a house with the help of an interest-bearing loan. This section takes up a quarter of the entire book.

Al-Qaradāwī's book was presented to the public in April 2002 at the Fourth General Islamic Conference of the Muslim World League in Saudi Arabia. It was also translated into English and French by the Al-Falah Foundation, a publishing house in Cairo with close ties to the Muslim Brotherhood. However, these translations do not include the first part of the book, in which al-Qaradāwī outlines his theoretical understanding of the Fiqh-al-aqallīyāt concept, because the publishers felt that this was too technical and would therefore not meet with much interest among readers.

=== ʿAbd al-Madschīd an-Naddschār (2003/04) ===
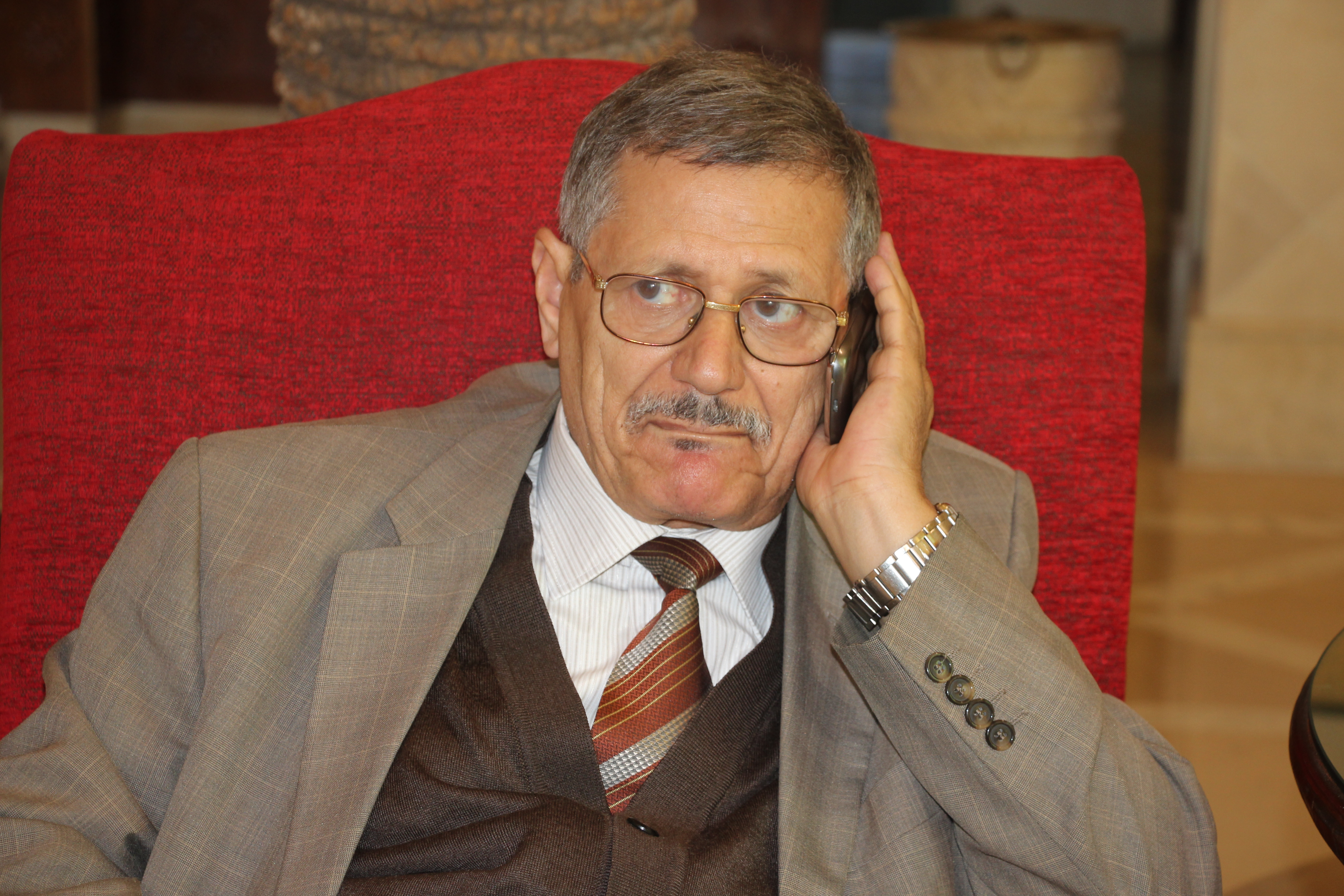
ʿAbd al-Madschīd an-Naddschār

Another scholar who attempted to theorize minority fiqh was the Paris-based Tunisian intellectual ʿAbd al-Majīd an-Najjār. In 2003, he published an article entitled "Towards a fundamental method for minority fiqh" (Naḥwa manhaǧ uṣūlī li-fiqh al-aqallīyāt) in the journal of the ECFR. There he mentions five guiding principles for this discipline: 1. preservation of religious life for the Muslim minority; 2. striving to make Islam known; 3. laying the foundation for a civilizing fiqh that is not limited to worship; 4. laying the foundation for a collective fiqh that purifies the Muslim community as a whole; and 5. orientation towards certain maxims of Islamic Law that must be adapted for fiqh al-aqallīyāt. As legal-theoretical rules to which the minority fiqh should be oriented, he cites the following examples: a) the rule that the results of action (maʾālāt al-afʿāl) are decisive, b) the principle that situations of necessity make forbidden things permissible, and c) the necessity of weighing up the beneficial and harmful aspects of a matter. In a second study published in the ECFR journal in 2004, an-Najjār further elaborated on the legal-theoretical concept of the results of action, which goes back to the 14th century Andalusian scholar Abū Ishāq ash-Shātibī, and its significance for minority fiqh.

== Content similarities and differences ==
=== Daʿwa as the ideological basis of the minority Fiqh ===
According to Andrew F. March, the most important basis for the theorization of minority fiqh is the concept of daʿwa. In fact, this concept plays a very important role in the books on minority fiqh. ʿAbd al-Qādir, for example, states at the beginning of his book that Islam abrogates all other revealed religions, i.e. replaces them in terms of content, since it is later, and has supremacy over them; the teachings that contradict Islam are error and false speech. The basis of Islam's relationship with members of other religions is the Daʿwa. Leaving those who speak falsehoods in error is an injustice that Islam cannot remain silent about. Rather, Muslims have the task of changing this situation as far as possible. This "emancipatory Daʿwa" (daʿwa taḥrīrīya) had come to connect man, and indeed every man, with heaven. ʿAbd al-Qādir points out that the majority of classical Islamic jurists were of the opinion that the basis of the relationship between Islam and disbelief was war, that peace was merely an exceptional situation due to an emergency and that the basis for this war was disbelief. However, he himself only saw a reason for war against non-Muslims if they were hostile to the Daʿwa. In this case, the Muslim state must "surprise them with power and severity". The editor of the book series in which the short version of his book was published, the Syrian journalist ʿUmar ʿUbaid Hasana, emphasized in his introduction the necessity of the presence of Muslim minorities in non-Islamic countries for the Daʿwa and referred to various historical precedents in which the migration of Muslims to non-Islamic areas had led to the spread of Islam.

al-Qaradāwī also emphasizes the necessity of the Muslim presence in the West. He justifies this by stating that Muslims have a "global message" with Islam and that the West occupies a leading position in the world. If there is not already an Islamic presence in the West, Muslims have a duty to create such a presence so that they "do not leave this strong, powerful West to Jewish influence alone". Looking at history, one can see that individual Muslims, traders, Sufis and others who emigrated from their home countries to various areas of Asia and Africa and mixed with the local population were of great importance for the spread of Islam because they led to people converting to Islam individually or collectively in the areas concerned. According to al-Qaradawī, the minority fiqh is intended to enable the Muslim community to carry out the task of proclaiming the "global message of Islam" (risālat al-islām al-ʿālamīya) to those with whom they live in order to have a good conversation with them, as required by Sura 16:25.

=== Reconceptualization of geographical space ===
All advocates of minority fiqh have in common that they reject the term Dār al-harb ("House of War") for the West. However, they adhere to a division of geographical space. While ʿAbd al-Qādir refers to the Islamic countries as Dār al-Islām and the non-Islamic countries as Dār al-kufr ("House of Unbelief"), al-Qaradāwī also avoids this term and prefers to speak of the "difference between Dār al-Islām and the other areas". However, this difference is so serious that it eclipses all other geographical differences, such as those between cities and villages, sedentary and nomadic people or northerners and southerners, "because the Dār al-Islām helps the Muslim to observe Islamic commandments and prohibitions, while other areas lack this advantage." The permissibility of residing in a non-Muslim country, or dār al-kufr, is beyond question for al-Qaradāwī, "because if we had forbidden it, as some scholars think, we would have closed the door to the call to Islam and its spread in the world, and Islam would always have been confined to the Arabian Peninsula and would never have emerged from it."

Al-ʿAlwānī completely rejects the traditional Islamic designations for the division of the world. For him, this results from the necessity of adopting the Qur'anic concept of geography. According to him, the earth belongs to God and Islam is his religion. As a result, every land is Dār al-Islām, either real in the present or potential in the future. At the end of his book, he expands on this idea. He argues that members of Muslim minorities should not feel bound by the historical fiqh terminology of Dār al-islām and Dār al-kufr, but should start from the Qur'anic view, which is expressed in Sura 7:128 ("Behold, the earth belongs to God. He bequeaths it to those of his servants whom he wills.") and Sura 21:105 ("We wrote in the Psalter, after the reminder that my pious servants will receive the earth as an inheritance"). Muslims should therefore not regard their stay in a country as accidental or temporary, but as permanent and gradually increasing.

In a separate section, Al-ʿAlwānī reminds Muslims that they are "the best Ummah that has been brought forth to mankind", as the Qur'an says in Sura 3:110. Their privileged position is manifested in the fact that they are commissioned by God to lead people out of darkness into the light. They should therefore not limit themselves to one geographical area, but should regard every country as Dār al-Islām, in which Muslims can live their religion safely, even if they live among a non-Muslim majority. Conversely, dār al-kufr is any country in which the believer cannot live his religion safely, even if all the inhabitants belong to the Islamic religion and culture. In support of this view, al-ʿAlwānī refers to a statement by al-Māwardī, a jurist primarily from the 11th century, quoted by Ibn Hajar al-ʿAsqalānī. He is reported to have said: "If (the Muslim) can show the religion openly in one of the lands of Dār al-harb, then the land becomes Dār al-Islām. Staying in that country is then more meritorious than leaving it, because it can be expected that others will convert to Islam."

As an alternative to the geographical terms Dār al-harb and Dār al-Islām, al-ʿAlwānī recommends the terms Dār ad-daʿwa ("House of the Call [i.e. to Islam]") and Dār al-ijāba ("House of Answering [i.e. the Call]"). The people could be divided analogously into Ummat ad-daʿwa ("community of call"), i.e. the non-Muslims, and Ummat al-ijāba ("community of response"), i.e. the Muslims. The 12th century Persian scholar Fachr ad-Dīn ar-Rāzī is said to have used these terms.

=== Reshaping the relationship with non-muslims ===
An important topic of the treatises on minority fiqh is also the relationship with non-Muslims. For example, ʿAbd al-Qādir discusses in detail the question of the loyalty of Muslims towards non-Muslims. He points out that there has always been a consensus among Muslim legal scholars that a Muslim may not interfere with the lives or property of unbelievers if there is a protective contract between him and them, because this entails a mutual obligation to provide protection. In addition, ʿAbd al-Qādir deals in detail with the Qur'anic prohibition of a relationship of loyalty (muwālāt) to Jews and Christians (Sura 5:51) or to unbelievers (Sura 3:28). He believes that this prohibition is limited solely to help (nuṣra), allegiance (ittibāʿ), love (ḥubb) and approval (riḍā). However, the prohibition does not mean that Muslims are not allowed to do good to unbelievers. On the contrary, it is perfectly permissible to treat them with kindness, to be tolerant, gracious, just and hospitable towards them, to exchange gifts with them and enter into loan relationships, to visit them, etc. It is only forbidden to approve of the doctrines and religious practices of unbelievers. However, Islam, together with the religion of the Ahl al-kitāb, can form a front against atheism. As proof that decency in dealing with non-Muslims is not forbidden, ʿAbd al-Qādir refers to the statement handed down by Ibn Taimīya: "It is not permissible for anyone to do injustice to anyone, even if he is an unbeliever."

According to al-ʿAlwānī, the following two Qur'anic verses should form the golden rule for Muslims' relationships with people of other faiths: "God does not forbid you to be kind to those who did not fight you because of religion and did not drive you out of your homes, and to treat them justly. God only forbids you to befriend those who fought you because of your religion and drove you out of your homes and helped others to drive you out. Whoever takes them as friends is one of the wrongdoers" (Sura 60:8-9). According to al-ʿAlwānī, these two verses define the ethical and legal basis according to which Muslims should treat people of other faiths, namely kindness and justice towards anyone who has not declared enmity against them. All new cases that arise should be decided on this basis.

Al-ʿAlwānī sees today's Muslims who have sought refuge in Western countries in a similar situation to the first followers of Muhammad in Mecca, who emigrated to Abyssinia to escape persecution by the Quraysh. Gaining the friendship of other people helped them to protect their religion and safeguard their interests. Muslims today should follow this example. Al-ʿAlwānī considers the behavior of Jaʿfar ibn Abī Tālib, who is said to have led the negotiations with the Negus, to be particularly exemplary. It is reported that he refused to prostrate himself before the ruler as demanded of him, but he was nevertheless able to win the ruler's sympathy for the Muslims, so that in the end he converted to Islam.

=== Advocacy of political participation ===
ʿAbd al-Qādir believes that Muslims in states that belong to the Dār al-kufr are also allowed to hold political office. As justification, he refers to Yūsuf al-Qaradāwī's statement that non-participation in the political system would lead to Muslims being isolated and remaining in the dark. Al-Qaradāwī himself states that one of the aims of the minority fiqh is to contribute to the education and enlightenment of minorities so that they can exercise their religious, cultural, social, economic and political rights and freedoms, which are enshrined in the constitution.

Al-ʿAlwānī emphasizes that the participation of Muslim minorities in the political life of the country in which they reside is not a bad state of affairs that must be legitimized after a concession, but rather the exercise of a positive duty and civilizing activity. In the societies in which they live, the Muslim minorities should stand up for their rights and not be involved in injustice. Al-ʿAlwānī takes this from the two Qur'anic verses Sura 26:227 and 42:39, which praise those believers who help themselves when they are wronged.

=== Positive interaction with the host society as a goal ===
According to al-Qaradāwī, the minority fiqh is intended to help Muslim minorities preserve the "essence of Islamic distinctiveness" (ǧauhar aš-šaḫṣīya al-islāmīya) with its religious teachings, cultic customs (šaʿāʾir) and values, so that they are able to raise their children on its basis. The difficult task, however, is to maintain a balance between preserving Muslim distinctiveness on the one hand and striving to integrate into and influence the surrounding society on the other. In his book, Al-Qaradāwī emphasizes that the Muslim minority is both part of the Islamic ummah and part of the specific society in which it lives. It is essential to take both sides into account, "in such a way that we do not give one predominance over the other and do not inflate one at the expense of the other."

According to al-Qaradāwī, the path of Muslim minorities in the Age of Arab Spring can be divided into seven phases: 1. the recognition of identity (aš-šuʿūr bi-l-huwīya), 2. Awakening (al-istīqāẓ), 3. departure (taḥarruk), 4. gathering (at-taǧammuʿ), 5. construction (al-bināʾ), 6. settlement (at-tauṭīn) and 7. interaction (at-tafāʿul). Muslims are now in this final phase of positive interaction with the host society. One of the aims of the minority fiqh is to promote this positive interaction. It should help the Muslim minority to be flexible and open in a regulated way, so that it does not withdraw into itself and isolate itself from the host society, but interacts positively with it in such a way that Muslims give it the best they have to offer and take from this society the best it has to offer. In this way, the Islamic community should achieve the difficult balance: "preservation without isolation" (muḥāfaẓa bi-lā inġilāq) and "integration without assimilation" (indimāǧ bi-lā ḏawabān).

Al-ʿAlwānī also formulated this idea to some extent. He believes that Muslims should participate in a positive way in majority societies, even if this requires "a certain politeness in a dark area" (nauʿ min al-muǧāmala fī nauʿ min al-ġabaš) that does not touch on the essence of the faith and the foundations of the religion. Wrongs and sins committed by non-Muslims should not prevent the Muslim from participating in their good activities. In his closing remarks, he emphasized that it is the duty of Muslims to participate positively in the political and social life (of their societies) in order to stand up for their rights, to support their fellow believers wherever they are, to convey the truths of Islam and to realize the internationality of Islam.

=== Theoretical and methodological foundations for the new Fiqh ===
While the advocates of minority fiqh have much in common in terms of their objectives, their ideas regarding the theoretical and methodological foundations for this new discipline show major differences.

==== Differences in the understanding of fiqh ====
The advocates of minority fiqh differ greatly, particularly in their understanding of fiqh. According to Midhat Māhir, they can be divided into two camps: 1. those who understand minority fiqh in the conventional sense as the science of religious law norms; and 2. those who understand it in a new sense as "knowledge of practical solutions to real problems". In his opinion, the most important representative of the first camp is al-Qaradāwī, and the most important representative of the second camp is al-ʿAlwānī.

According to al-Qaradāwī, the minority fiqh is only a special fiqh within the general fiqh. In his opinion, it has become necessary because in the present day there has been a mutual mixing of peoples and migration processes, and the different regions have come so close together that they are "like one country". This special fiqh should have a similar status to other already established special areas of fiqh such as medical, economic and political fiqh. Minority fiqh should have an ambivalent relationship with the heritage of Islamic norms: it should respect this heritage, but must also take into account the circumstances, trends and problems of the time to the same extent. It does not cover up the heritage that was created by "brilliant minds" (ʿuqūl ʿabqarīya) over 1400 years, but it does not sink into it to such an extent that it forgets its own time with its theoretical and scientific currents and problems.

Al-ʿAlwānī, on the other hand, emphasizes more strongly the break with the past. According to him, the minority fiqh should not be understood in the sense that is widespread today as a fiqh of practical legal applications (furūʿ). Rather, it should be understood in the general sense of fiqh ("understanding, knowledge") as something that includes both the dogmatic and the practical aspects of revelation, in the sense of "the greater fiqh" (al-fiqh al-akbar), as Abū Hanīfa called it in the 8th century. In his opinion, anyone working in this field not only needs knowledge of Sharia law, but must also be familiar with a number of social sciences, in particular sociology, economics, political science and international relations. According to al-ʿAlwānī, the problems faced by Muslim minorities go far beyond the traditional issues on an individual level, such as permitted food, halāl meat, determining the beginning of the month and marriage to a non-Muslim. They concern issues related to "Islamic identity", namely the message of Islam in its new homeland, its connection with the Islamic Ummah and the future of Islam beyond today's borders.

According to al-ʿAlwānī, it is also necessary for the development of minority fiqh that the right questions are asked. He dedicates the fourth chapter of his book to what he calls "the great questions" (al-asʾila al-kubrā). The first of these questions is: "How can members of minorities find a precise answer to the questions 'Who are we?' and 'What do we want?' that reflects both their specific situation and what they have in common with others?" The catalog, which comprises 18 questions, shows that al-ʿAlwānī does not regard the minority fiqh as a simple system for answering personal questions of norms, but as a theoretical framework for the political and social interaction between the majority and Muslim minorities in non-Muslim countries and within the Muslim minority itself. At the end of the chapter, he concludes that "many of the earlier fiqh efforts undertaken during the period of the great empires could hardly help Muslims" in establishing a contemporary minority fiqh.

In al-ʿAlwānī's opinion, a new fiqh is also necessary because the earlier fiqh scholars lived in a world "consisting of separate islands between which there was no coexistence and understanding." Due to the requirements of the time, a "fiqh of war" (fiqh al-ḥarb) prevailed, while what is needed today in a changed reality is the construction of a "fiqh of coexistence" (fiqh at-taʿāyuš). Works such as Iqtiḍāʾ aṣ-ṣirāt al-mustaqīm by Ibn Taimīya, in which Muslims were called upon to distinguish themselves from Jews, Christians and non-Muslims, were the reaction to a certain reality that differed from today's reality. In the concluding speech to the English translation of his book, al-ʿAlwānī explains that fiqh councils are not the adequate means for the development of minority fiqh because they only reproduce old fatwas in a modern language.

ʿUjjail an-Nashamī, who wrote a critical commentary on al-ʿAlwānī's program, accuses him of confusing theoretical principles and practical rules in the fiqh al-aqallīyāt. While the minority fiqh required practical rules (aḥkām), al-ʿAlwānī claimed to revive "the greater fiqh" (al-Fiqh al-akbar), which, however, only generated theoretical principles. In his commentary, An-Nashamī also doubted that the term fiqh al-aqallīyāt was an "accurate designation", as al-ʿAlwānī had claimed, and proposed "fundamentals of the jurisprudence of coexistence" (uṣūl fiqh at-taʿāyuš) as an alternative.

==== The need for a new Ishtihād ====
According to al-ʿAlwānī, the questions that arise for Muslim minorities can only be solved through a new Ijtihād. The inherited fiqh with its rules for dealing with non-Muslims is very closely linked to the historical reality in which it arose, so it cannot be used for historical situations of a different nature. For al-ʿAlwānī, Ishtihād is not an activity that extends to the realm of normative scientific production, but an intellectual state that leads people to think methodically according to logical rules. ʿAtīya expresses a similar view. In his view, the fiqh scriptures are merely human endeavors with no binding religious law, especially since they were only a response to certain contemporary circumstances that differ from those of today. What is needed, he argues, are new ijtihād efforts "that take into account our circumstances and deal with the new things that have arisen."

al-Qaradāwī also sees the need for a new Ijtihād. He states that one of the aims of the minority fiqh is to answer the questions that arise for Muslim minorities in non-Muslim societies "within the framework of a new Shari'ah-based Ishtihād on the ground by people who are part of these societies." He also mentions the "solid contemporary jihad" (iǧtihād muʿāṣir qawīm) as one of the new pillars on which the minority fiqh is based. According to al-Qaradāwī, ijtihād is a duty imposed by the religion because it alone ensures that the Shari'ah can be applied at all times and in all places.

Al-Qaradāwī distinguishes between two types of ijtihād, namely the "deliberative selective" (tarǧīḥī intiqāʾī) and the "original creative" (ibdāʿī inšāʾī) ijtihād. In the former, the fiqh scholar studies the rich heritage of doctrines of earlier jurists and selects what seems most suitable for the realization of the purposes of the Shari'ah and the interests of the people; the latter is to be applied to newly arising questions of life to which the classical fiqh does not provide an answer. If fiqh in general requires ijtihād in its two forms, minority fiqh is even more dependent on it because of the special circumstances in which minorities live. According to al-Qaradāwī, the Ijtihād is part of the "renewal" (taǧdīd) to which the hadith refers, according to which God sends a renewer of the religion to the ummah at the beginning of each century. The renewal of the religion should include the renewal of its fiqh and its understanding, which in turn is only possible with a solid contemporary ijtihād.

==== The role of the Maqāsid theory ====
According to al-ʿAlwānī, when a question related to minority fiqh arises, it is necessary to investigate the background of the question and the questioner and the social factors that gave rise to the question, in order to then deal with it taking into account the basic maqāṣid aš-šarīʿa. The maqāṣid aš-šarīʿa is a concept of recent Islamic legal theory that assumes that there is a certain number of universal maqāsid ("purposes, goals, intentions") to which all individual provisions of the Sharia, i.e. the Islamic doctrine of norms, can be traced back. The purposes are usually called the preservation of life, religion, family, reason and property. Al-ʿAlwānī argues that the fiqh scholars should expand the list of recognized Sharia purposes according to the needs and priorities of the Islamic community.

In addition to the maqāsid of the Sharia, al-ʿAlwānī recommends an orientation towards the "maqāsid of the Qur'an" (maqāṣid al-qurʾān) for the development of rules for minority fiqh. These are a special concept of his own system of thought. In order to uncover these purposes, it is necessary to perform ijtihād in the form of a "combination of the two readings" (ǧamʿ baina al-qirāʾatain), the "reading that takes revelation as a companion in understanding existence and discovering its laws", and the "reading that takes the laws of existence as a companion in understanding the revealed verses". As soon as one performs the operation of "combining the two readings", one finds that the three highest values to which the two books, namely the written (= the Qur'an) and the created (= nature), point are tawhid, purification (tazkīya) and civilization (ʿumrān). These values reflect the purposes that God pursues with his creation. These were the original values of Islam before jurists influenced by Greek logic and philosophy came along and said that this or that was wāǧib or farḍ ('obligatory'), mandūb or mustaḥabb ('desirable') or harām or maḥẓūr ('forbidden'), i.e. before the categories for judging human actions were introduced.

In al-Qaradāwī, the orientation towards the maqāsid of the Sharia is not quite as pronounced. Although the fiqh scholar should be guided by them in selective ijtihād, al-Qaradāwī believes that the minority fiqh must strike a balance between the particular source texts of the Shari'ah and its universal goals.

==== The sources of the minority Fiqh ====
In order to ensure alignment with the "purposes of the Qur'an" (maqāṣid al-qurʾān), various principles must be adhered to according to al-ʿAlwānī, such as the recognition of the dominant position and primacy of the Qur'an as the judge of everything else, including the hadiths and religious traditions. If the Qur'an then establishes a general rule, such as the principle of "goodness and justice" (al-birr wa-l-qisṭ) in the relationship with non-Muslims, and hadiths exist that seem to contradict it, then one must be guided by the Qur'an and interpret the hadiths as far as possible in such a way that they correspond to the teachings of the Qur'an. In general, al-ʿAlwānī assigns the prophetic Sunnah only the role of a subordinate auxiliary norm: "The Sunnah revolves around the Qur'an and is connected to it, but never takes precedence over it."

In a somewhat weakened form, al-Qaradāwī also holds this view. He believes that the sources of minority fiqh should be the same as for fiqh in general, although minority fiqh must adopt innovative positions (wiqfāt taǧdīdīya) in relation to these sources. The sources include first of all the Qur'an, the "father of all laws and regulations", then the Sunnah, where not everything in it is suitable for legislation. Some hadiths are correct, but require interpretation, such as the hadith: "Do not greet Jews and Christians first. And if you meet them on the street, push them to the narrowest point." It contradicts the words of the Quran, which allow believers to be friendly to non-Muslims (Sura 60:8) and call on them to greet those who greet them (Sura 4:86). This hadith should therefore be interpreted in such a way that it only refers to those who fight Muslims, but not to those who make peace with them.

According to al-Qaradāwī's view, consensus and analogy should also be used in addition to the Qur'an and Sunnah when determining the law, as well as various secondary sources such as the consideration of utility (istiṣlāḥ) and customary law. Among the nine pillars of minority fiqh, al-Qaradāwī also mentions the consideration of Islamic legal maxims. He lists a total of forty such legal maxims in the relevant section.

==== Consideration of the reality of life for minorities ====
Al-Qaradāwī said that the numerical strength of the respective minority must be taken into account when issuing fatwas. Here is a map of Muslim minorities in Europe by population percentage(2011). <1 % 1 %–2 % 2 %–4 % 4 %–5 % 5 %–10 % 10 %–20 % 20 %–30 % 30 %–40 %

According to al-ʿAlwānī's definition, minority fiqh is "a specific fiqh that takes into account the binding nature of legal judgment to the circumstances of the community concerned and the place in which it lives". It is the fiqh of an enclosed community with special circumstances and special needs. What is suitable for them is not necessarily suitable for other communities. Among the rules for the development of minority fiqh, he mentions the "close examination of the reality of life". As long as this reality with all its components is not understood, it is impossible to formulate the fiqh problem in such a way that the Qur'an can be successfully consulted in this regard. He also emphasizes that fiqh must always be tested against practical reality. According to al-ʿAlwānī, the process of developing the rules and issuing fatwa must become an ongoing dispute between fiqh and reality. Reality should become a laboratory that shows Muslims how suitable the respective fatwa is.

Al-Qaradāwī also emphasizes this point. According to him, most Muslim scholars are not aware of the true situation and suffering of Muslim minorities in non-Muslim society; however, it is not enough to issue them fatwas based on the classical fiqh books without knowing the reality of their lives and studying their needs and requirements to a sufficient extent. In his opinion, the contemporary imjtihād can only fulfill its task if the jurist is interested in the reality of life (al-wāqiʿ al-muʿaiyaš) and adds the understanding of the reality of life to the understanding of the texts and arguments. Just as a doctor can only administer an antidote, Consideration of the reality of life for minorities, if he has first fully understood the illness through close observation of the sick person, the mufti, the issuer of Islamic legal opinions, must know the reality of life of the respective minority in addition to the law of God in order to carry out a successful contemporary Ishtihād. It is therefore the duty of the mufti to study the reality of the minority for which he issues fatwas. In doing so, he must also take into account that the minorities differ greatly from one another. For example, there are major differences between immigrant and long-established minorities, between oppressed and influential minorities, between numerically small and large minorities, between those living in liberal constitutional states and those living in dictatorships, and between fragmented and well-organized minorities.

At the beginning of his book, al-Qaradāwī gives an overview of the various Muslim minorities in the East and West. Basically, he says, the minority fiqh must look at people's problems from a realistic rather than an idealistic perspective.

==== Consideration of predicaments and needs ====
Nuh Ha Mim Keller, who discussed minority fiqh with al-ʿAlwānī in 1995, emphasized the importance of the principle of darūra, which states that Muslims who are in a position of weakness can make use of exceptions in fiqh. This principle is of central importance in al-Qaradāwī's theory. For him, the recognition of human necessities (ḍarūrāt) and needs (ḥāǧāt) is one of the nine basic pillars that minority fiqh must take into account. He sees this principle as being inherent in the Sharia itself, because it provides for exceptions to the prohibitions in situations of necessity. He uses Sura 2:173 as an example, which states that believers who are forced to eat forbidden food are not committing a sin. In his opinion, part of the reality orientation of Sharia is that it equates need (ḥāǧa) with compulsion in some cases. In his opinion, the recognition of need as a reason for the easing of regulations is also documented in the Sunnah, because there is the tradition that Muhammad allowed his two companions ʿAbd ar-Rahmān ibn ʿAuf and az-Zubair ibn al-ʿAuwām, who suffered from itching due to the nature of their garments, to wear silk clothing, although he had previously generally forbidden this to men.

In an-Najjār's view, the principle that constraints make forbidden things permissible is one of the three rules of legal theory that minority fiqh should be guided by. He believes that this principle may be applied in minority fiqh because Muslims in Europe are subject to positive law, which in many cases runs counter to Sharia law.

Al-ʿAlwānī, on the other hand, was rather skeptical of this concept. In his book, he stated that the aim of minority fiqh is not to grant concessions to minorities that the Islamic majorities do not enjoy. Rather, this fiqh should turn the minorities into exemplary models that represent the Islamic ummah in the countries in which they live. In this respect, it represents a fiqh of the "elite" and the rigorous interpretation of duties (ʿazāʾim). Answering the questions that arise for Muslim minorities with the maxim that constraints make forbidden things permissible has a harmful effect on their "Islamic character". ʿUjail an-Nashamī also criticized this point in his commentary. He accuses al-ʿAlwānī of wanting to make life more difficult than necessary for minorities by depriving them of legitimate opportunities to facilitate Islamic norms.

==== The principle of facilitation in al-Qaradāwī ====
For al-Qaradāwī, the strong consideration of the predicaments and needs of Muslims has a functional context. In his view, the minority fiqh has the primary goal of helping Muslim minorities, both individuals and families and various communities, to lead "a carefree life" (ḥayāh muyassara) with their Islam. Adopting the principle of ease (manhaǧ at-taisīr) is also one of the cornerstones of minority fiqh for al-Qaradāwī. Al-Qaradāwī derives this principle from various Qur'anic verses (including Sura 2:185, 4:28) as well as from the tradition according to which Muhammad asked his companions to make things easier and not more difficult (yassirū wa-lā tuʿassirū). This principle, still practiced by Muhammad's companions, was increasingly lost in the following generations. As a result, new burdens arose for the people, which Muhammad was supposedly sent to remove.

According to al-Qaradāwī, the principle of facilitation must be observed in particular in connection with the rule of "amending the fatwa according to the changed requirements" (taġaiyur al-fatwā bi-taġaiyur mūǧibāti-hā), which in his opinion is represented in one way or another in all schools of law. In this regard, he notes that the greatest change that can be brought about by a change of location is the difference between Dār al-Islām and the other areas, because Dār al-Islām helps the Muslim to observe Islamic commandments and prohibitions, while other areas lack this advantage. Therefore, in Dār al-Islām, ignorance of the religious rules is inexcusable, whereas outside of Dār al-Islām it can be an excuse for the ignorant. Basically, a Muslim in a non-Islamic society is weaker and therefore needs a higher degree of relief.

According to al-Qaradāwī, in order to realize the principle of facilitation, it is also necessary to free oneself from the madhhab bond (at-taḥarrur min al-iltizām al-maḏhabī). According to al-Qaradāwī, the contemporary mufti should lead people out of the "prison of the oppressive madhhab system into the wide courtyard of the Sharia", which, in addition to the eight madhhabs that are still followed, also includes those madhhabs that have perished, doctrines of imams who have not established a madhhab, and also the doctrines of the scholars among the companions of Muhammad. According to al-Qaradāwī, people have made life unnecessarily difficult for themselves by binding themselves to a school of law, whereas God wanted to make it easy for them.

=== A fiqh not only for Muslim minorities: ʿAtīyas' counter-proposal ===
Almost all studies on fiqh al-aqallīyāt are characterized by the fact that they limit the concept of minorities to Muslim minorities. The only exception is the book Towards a New Minority Fiqh by Jamāl ad-Dīn ʿAtīya. It deals not only with Muslim minorities outside Islamic countries and non-Muslim minorities within Islamic countries, but also with religious, ethnic, linguistic and cultural minorities in general and the globally widespread problem of chauvinism towards minorities and discrimination against them. In ʿAtīya's opinion, these problems can only be solved with the help of international agreements. He ascribes "absolute authority" (marǧiʿīya muṭlaqa) to agreements such as religious texts. He therefore considers it one of the most important duties of Islamic states to adhere to the international agreements to which they have signed up. In this context, he refers to the words of the Qur'an in Sura 5:1 and Sura 2:177, which call for compliance with treaties.

Another principle that ʿAtīya wants to be observed in minority fiqh is that of reciprocity, which in his view is anchored not only in international law, but also in Sharia law. This principle requires Muslims to put non-Muslim minorities in Islamic countries and Muslim minorities in non-Islamic countries in relation to each other and then measure them with the same yardstick. However, ʿAtīya believes that reciprocity on the Islamic side must be tied to what is virtuous. For example, if the enemies violate the honor of Muslims' wives, then Muslims should not violate the honor of their wives. If they kill the women and children, Muslims should not do the same. If they starve prisoners of war to death, Muslims should not repay them in kind.

ʿAtīya emphasizes that a holistic view is necessary in the search for just solutions. You have to treat people the way you want to be treated and should not apply double standards depending on whether you belong to the majority or minority. For this reason, he also rejects concepts that are based solely on the demands of Muslim minorities without considering the demands of non-Muslim minorities. As a negative example, he refers to the book on minority fiqh by Tāhā al-ʿAlwānī.

== Application examples ==
In the second part of his book, Al-Qaradāwī offers a number of fatwas as examples of the application of fiqh al-aqallīyāt. Another collection of cases can be found in the third part of his book "On the Guidance of Islam. Contemporary Fatwas" (Min hady al-Islām. Fatāwā muʿāṣira). The following sections present a selection of particularly well-known and much-discussed fatwas that are attributed to fiqh al-aqallīyāt:

=== Is a rapprochement between religions permissible? ===
The first fatwa in al-Qaradāwī's book on fiqh al-aqallīyāt is dedicated to the question of whether rapprochement between religions, especially between Islam and Christianity, is permissible. He begins his remarks on this question by pointing out that the term "rapprochement between religions" is used for different situations, some of which are to be rejected, while others are permissible. What should be rejected is a resolution of the fundamental differences between the various religions, such as between the tauhīd in Islam and the Trinity in Christianity, as well as between the transcendental image of God (tanzīh) in Islam and the anthropomorphic image of God (tašbīh) in Judaism. This also includes the different view of Jesus Christ among Muslims and Christians. Another fundamental difference between Muslims and Ahl al-kitāb is that the Qur'an, the holy book of Muslims, has been preserved from any change, while the Torah and the Gospel have been proven to have been falsified.

Among the permissible forms of rapprochement between the religions, al-Qaradāwī counts the "conversation in a good way" (al-ḥiwār bi-llatī hiya aḥsan). Muslims are even obliged to argue with their opponents in a good way because it is a means of daʿwa, as the Qur'an says in Sura 16:125: "Call to the way of your Lord with wisdom and with beautiful preaching and argue with them in a good way". Cooperation in the fight against atheism and libertinism is also desirable. He cited the coordinated action of Azhar (Egypt), the Islamic World League and the Vatican at the 1994 World Population Conference in Cairo and at the 1995 World Conference on Women in Beijing as an example of how Muslims and Christians can act together successfully. Another common field of activity could be the fight for justice for oppressed peoples. Finally, al-Qaradāwī also sees the possibility of joint action to spread the spirit of tolerance against fanaticism.

=== Marriage of a Muslim to a non-Muslim ===
Al-Qaradāwī points out that it is generally permissible for a Muslim to marry a woman from the Ahl al-kitāb. Only marriage to a polytheist, an atheist, a member of the Baha'i faith or an apostate is forbidden. However, al-Qaradāwī clearly restricts the basic permission to marry a woman from the Ahl al-kitāb by naming four conditions that must be met:

1. The woman must be a believer. It is therefore not enough for her to come from a Christian home.
2. Women must be chaste, a quality that is rarely found in today's Western societies.
3. The woman must not belong to a people that is hostile to Muslims and fights against them. From this, al-Qaradāwī deduces that a Muslim may not marry a Jewish woman in the present because "every Jewish woman is a soldier in the Israeli army in her spirit".
4. No harm or strife may arise from the marriage. If, for example, marriages with non-Muslim women became widespread among the Muslim minority in question, the logic and spirit of Sharia law would require the prohibition of such marriages, because otherwise Muslim women would no longer find Muslim husbands. Since there is also a risk that a non-Muslim wife will culturally dominate marriage and family life and bring up the children together according to her own values, it must be ensured that the wife, if she does not accept the Islamic faith, at least accepts the social traditions and customs of Islam.

Due to the dangers he assumed for the Muslim family, al-Qaradāwī came to the conclusion that marriage with non-Muslim women should be prohibited in the present. Such a marriage is only permitted if there is a "compelling necessity" or an "urgent need".

=== Case of the woman who converts to Islam without her husband ===
Al-Qaradāwī also discusses the question of whether a married woman who converts to Islam while her husband remains non-Muslim must divorce him. The question is significant in his view because such a rule, as propagated by many Islamic jurists, may prevent married women from converting to Islam. At the beginning of his discussion, al-Qaradāwī lists nine different opinions of classical jurists on this question, which he found in the work Aḥkām ahl aḏ-ḏimma by Ibn Qayyim al-Jawziyya. The first five opinions call for the immediate or later separation of the spouses, while the second group of opinions favors maintaining the marriage. The sixth opinion allows the wife to wait and hope that her husband will also convert, even if this takes years. It is based on the tradition that ʿUmar ibn al-Khattāb gave a converting woman the choice of staying with her husband, who remained a Christian, or leaving him. The seventh opinion, which is attributed to ʿAlī ibn Abī Tālib, states that even if the husband remains non-Muslim, he retains the right to his wife as long as she does not emigrate. According to the eighth opinion, the marriage continues unless the Imam or the Qādī separates them. The last opinion states that the woman remains his wife and that all rights and duties continue to exist with the exception of the sexual relationship.

Ibn al-Qaiyim himself opted for the sixth opinion when discussing this question. Al-Qaradāwī criticizes Ibn al-Qaiyim for not having sufficiently dealt with all nine opinions in his discussion, but for having limited himself to this sixth opinion alone. He himself advocates the seventh doctrine, which is attributed to ʿAlī ibn Abī Tālib. According to him, it is a specification of the Qur'anic injunction in Surah 60:10. There it says: "O you who believe! When believing women come to you as emigrants, test them! God knows their faith very well. If you then recognize them as believers, do not send them back to the unbelievers. They are not permitted to the disbelievers and the disbelievers are not permitted to them." In ʿAlī's opinion, al-Qaradāwī explains, this rule should only apply to women who had left their husbands and emigrated to the Muslims, but not to women who had remained with their husbands.

Since ʿUmar ibn al-Khattāb had also given a wife who had converted to Islam the choice of remaining with her husband who had remained Christian, al-Qaradāwī considers it proven that today's Muslim converts are also allowed to remain with their non-Muslim husbands. This should be a "great relief" (taisīr ʿaẓīm) for them. Al-Qaradāwī describes his decision in favor of the seventh doctrine transmitted by Ibn al-Qaiyim elsewhere as "selective, deliberative ijtihād".

=== Can a Muslim inherit from a non-muslim? ===
The four Sunni schools of law actually prohibit this, due to a saying of Muhammad that has been handed down, according to which neither a Muslim inherits from a Kāfir nor, conversely, a Kāfir from a Muslim. In al-Qaradāwī's opinion, this rule impairs the financial possibilities of Western converts to Islam whose parents do not convert, and thus stands in the way of conversions to Islam. For this reason, he recommends disregarding the existing scholarly consensus and orienting oneself towards the concept of general interest (maṣlaḥa). Since there is an interest in making it easier for potential Islam converts to convert, the inheritance of a Muslim from a non-Muslim should be permitted.

=== Adoption of a child ===
This case was decided by the Mauritanian scholar Muhammad Al-Mukhtar Al-Shinqiti (born 1966), Director of the Islamic Center of South Plains in Lubbock (Texas). Al-Shinqiti ruled in a fatwa in 2005 that Muslims living in non-Muslim countries who wish to adopt a child may give the child their own surname, although this is actually forbidden according to Sura 33:5. He justified this exception by stating that there is a predicament here because parents who do not give their adopted children their own surname encounter many legal difficulties in non-Muslim countries.

=== Congratulating the Ahl al-kitāb on their festivals ===
In his book, al-Qaradāwī also addresses the question of a Muslim student living in Germany as to whether it is permissible for Muslims to congratulate members of the Ahl al-kitāb on their festivals. In his answer, al-Qaradāwī refers to Sura 60:8-9, according to which God does not forbid the believers to be friendly to those who do not fight them. From this, it can be concluded that Muslims are not prohibited from exchanging gifts and greetings with the Ahl al-kitāb on festive occasions, as long as these do not contain symbols of the other religion, such as the cross. Although he was aware that Ibn Taimīya had taken a stricter view, he could only agree with his opinion regarding the rejection of Muslims' participation in religious celebrations of the polytheists and Ahl al-kitāb. In any case, it is inadmissible for Muslims to celebrate Christmas themselves, "because we have our festivals and they have their festivals." However, there is nothing wrong with Muslim neighbors or colleagues congratulating people. He himself assumes that Ibn Taimīya would have changed or softened his opinion if he had lived in the present day, because there are several reasons to adapt the fatwa to the times. These include al-Qaradāwī 1. the need of Muslims to interact with non-Muslims because they have become their teachers in many sciences and arts; 2. the need of the Islamic Daʿwa to approach people through kindness; 3. the fact that congratulating a colleague or neighbor does not imply agreement with the Christian faith; 4. the fact that Christmas has largely lost its religious character in the present day and has become a national custom.

=== Purity of dogs ===
This example is discussed by al-Qaradāwī in the section on the pillars of minority fiqh. While Hanafis, Shafiites and Hanbalis were very rigid in their emphasis on the impurity of dogs, Mālik ibn Anas was less strict and considered every living creature, even dogs and pigs, to be pure. In the 8th century, Mālik derived the purity of dogs from the Quranic statement in Sura 5:4 that animals captured by them during hunting may be eaten. As dogs were ubiquitous in the West, Muslims should follow Mālik's doctrine because the view of the impurity of dogs "restricted them in their religion and complicated their everyday lives".

=== Purchase of a residential building with the help of an interest-bearing loan ===
Is it permissible to buy a house in Western countries with the help of an interest-bearing loan? In his book, al-Qaradāwī discusses this question in particular detail, as it had caused particularly fierce controversy among Muslims in previous years. He begins his remarks on this issue by noting that some Muslim scholars from India and Pakistan, belonging to the Hanafi madhhab, had issued fatwa allowing their fellow Muslims living in Britain to engage in such transactions, enabling them to buy houses in central London and become major property owners in England today. In a long list, he highlights the financial and non-financial benefits of home ownership (including tax advantages, independence, future security). He then gives an overview of the range of positions of the various modern Muslim scholars on this issue: for example, the legal academy of the Organization of the Islamic Conference had declared it impermissible to take out an interest-bearing loan with reference to the Ribā prohibition, while the Syrian legal scholar Mustafā az-Zarqā (1904–1999) had permitted such interest-bearing loans in non-Islamic countries in accordance with the Hanafi legal tradition. Az-Zarqā had justified his position in a fatwa by stating that it was a goal of Sharia law to preserve the wealth of Muslims. Since buying a house puts the Muslim in a better position than a tenancy, taking out an interest-bearing loan to buy a house is permissible.

For twenty years, Al-Qaradāwī himself had classified the purchase of home ownership with the help of interest-bearing loans as forbidden in fatwas. Later, however, he had a change of heart, which al-Qaradāwī explained as a result of his age. In 1999, he contributed to an ECFR fatwa in which such transactions were declared permissible.

The ECFR fatwa, which al-Qaradāwī reproduces in its entirety, bases its argumentation mainly on the Islamic legal maxim of "constraints make the forbidden things permissible" (aḍ-ḍarūrāt tubīḥḥūrāt) and at the same time points out that, according to the Islamic jurists, a special or general need (ḥāǧa) can have the same status as the situation of necessity (ḍarūra). Such a need exists in the European context because the ban on taking out interest-bearing loans prevents Muslims from acquiring property and thus puts them in a weaker position. The fatwa also referred to the doctrine of Abū Hanīfa, according to which it is permissible for Muslims outside the Dār al-islām to conduct business with Ribā. From this it was concluded that Muslims are not required to change the economic and financial rules in a non-Islamic society.

Two members of the ECFR, the Muslim Brother Muhammad al-Barāzī in Denmark and the Pakistani Suhaib Hasan ʿAbd al-Ghaffār, who lives in England, had publicly criticized the ECFR's fatwa in the newspaper Ash-Sharq al-ausat. On the one hand, they argued that the committee had misinterpreted the Hanafi madhhab in two ways, firstly because Hanafis only allow ribā in Dār al-Harb, but this category does not apply to European countries, and secondly because Hanafis only allow Muslims in non-Islamic societies to take interest, but not to give it. Secondly, al-Barāzī and ʿAbd al-Ghaffār argued that in this case the council had improperly applied the principle of need becoming compulsion, because the financial weakness of Muslims in Europe was not the result of avoiding interest-bearing loans, but of their disunity. Only if Muslims who wanted to buy a house were unable to rent an apartment at a reasonable price or buy it in a religiously permissible manner could they take out an interest-bearing loan.

Al-Qaradāwī concludes his remarks by reproducing a reply in which he rejected the objections of the two scholars. In it, he emphasizes that the question of whether the Muslim minorities' need for home ownership constitutes a "predicament" should not be left to Islamic legal scholars, but should also be assessed by non-religious experts and European Muslims themselves.

=== Participation in elections in non-Islamic countries ===
Are Muslims allowed to actively participate in elections in non-Islamic countries? This problem is cited by the American Sheikh Muhammad Nur Abdullah as an example of the application of minority fiqh. He explains that political elections in Muslim countries are very different from those in non-Muslim countries because in the former Muslims can vote for Islamic parties, while in the latter such parties do not exist. Under these circumstances, some Muslims might come to the erroneous conclusion that by actively participating in elections one is violating the prohibition in the Qur'an (e.g. Sura 5:51) that one should not take non-Muslims as patrons. In Fiqh al-aqallīyāt, however, this is understood differently, namely that Muslims should vote for the party that best serves their interests.

== The public discussion about the minority Fiqh ==
Al-ʿAlwānī's program and al-Qaradāwī's treatise aroused great interest in the concept of minority fiqh among the Islamic public, so that it became the subject of a lively public debate. One of the first events at which this concept was discussed was the 13th Conference of the Supreme Council for Islamic Affairs, which reports to the Egyptian Ministry of Religious Affairs, in May/June 2001. Four lectures at this event alone dealt with fiqh al-aqallīyāt.

=== The polemic al-Būtīs (2001/03) ===
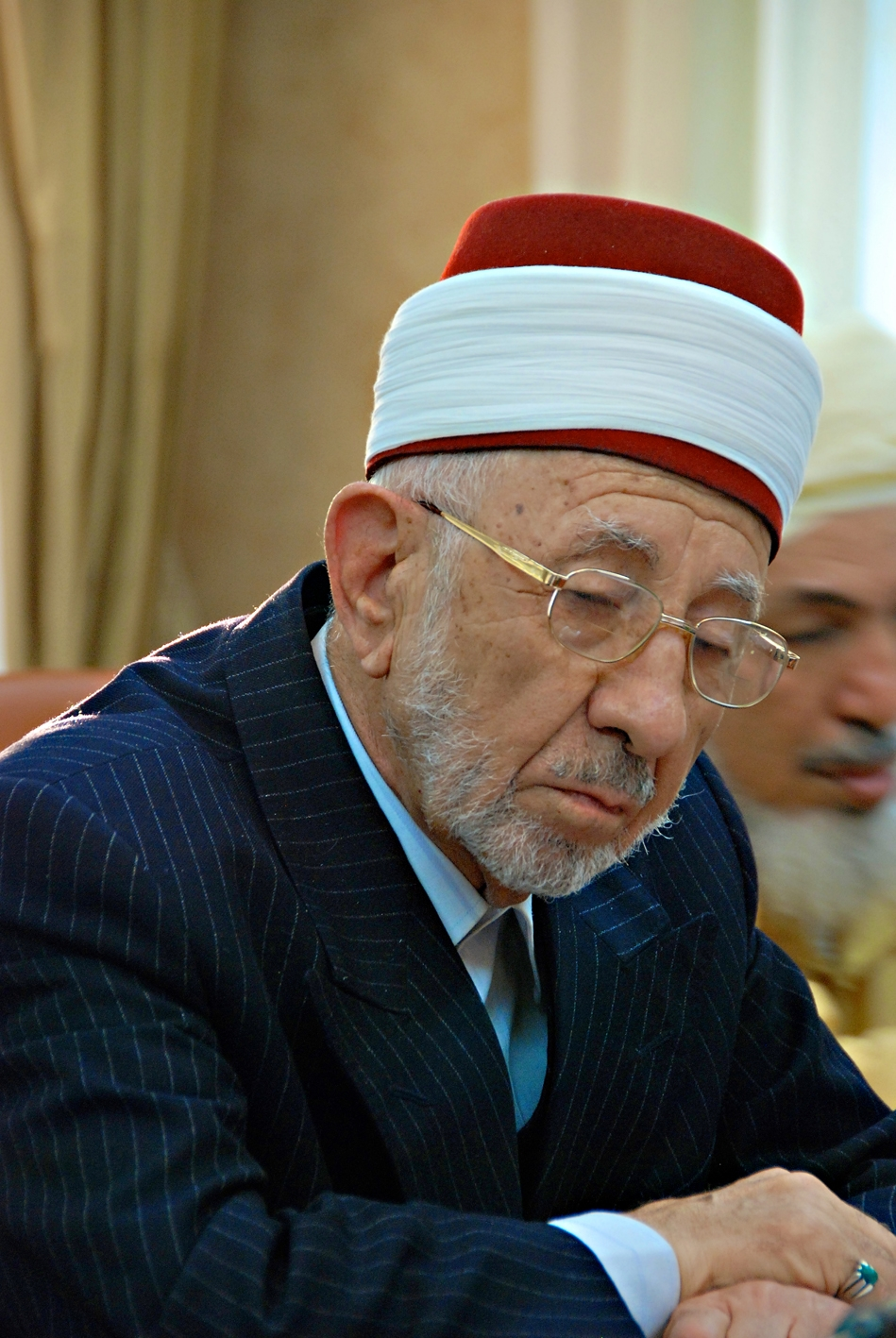
Muhammad Saʿīd Ramadān al-Būtī, one of the fiercest opponents of minority fiqh

The public discussion about the concept was particularly sparked by the fact that in June 2001 the Syrian scholar Muhammad Saʿīd Ramadān al-Būtī severely criticized the concept in one of his monthly letters published on the Internet. In this text, entitled "It is no coincidence that the call for minority fiqh coincides with the plan to divide Islam", he accused the advocates of minority fiqh of pursuing a project that would ultimately lead to the fragmentation of the unified global Islam into different regional Islams, which would then be in conflict with each other. The development of an independent Western Islam, which differs from Islam in the Islamic countries, is by no means desirable and cannot be based on any foundations. When the advocates of fiqh al-aqallīyāt pointed out that it was based on various legal maxims, it could be argued that these were general principles that were in no way limited to certain regions such as Europe and America.

Al-Būtī accused the proponents of fiqh al-aqallīyāt of wanting to develop a special Islamic doctrine of norms that was compatible with the surrounding "currents of unbelief, depravity and rebelliousness". However, the mere fact that Muslims live in the "house of unbelief" (dār al-kufr) does not constitute a predicament that justifies the development of such a special doctrine of norms. Since God had commanded the Muslims to emigrate to Dār al-Islām if they were not allowed to apply Islamic rules, they should not allow any changes to the Islamic doctrine of norms. In this context, al-Būtī refers on the one hand to the example of Muhammad, who emigrated from Mecca with his followers when he was cornered by the Mushrikūn, and on the other hand to Sura 4:97, where those believers who did not emigrate from the area of oppression are threatened with punishment in hell. In contrast, al-Būtī saw the minority fiqh as a threat to Muslims living in the West, because it put them in danger of being absorbed into the movement of "sinful Western civilization".

Al-Būtī later continued to polemicize against the minority fiqh. On May 16, 2003, the Friday after Maulid an-Nabī, he castigated it in his Friday sermon in Damascus, which was broadcast live on satellite television, as "the latest means of tampering with the religion of God" (aḥdaṯ wasāʾil at-talāʿub bi-dīn Allāh). The New Muslims of Nottingham, a neo-traditionalist group of New Muslims in England, translated al-Būtī's criticism of minority fiqh into English and thus made it accessible to the Western public.

=== The criticism by Tariq Ramadan (2003) ===
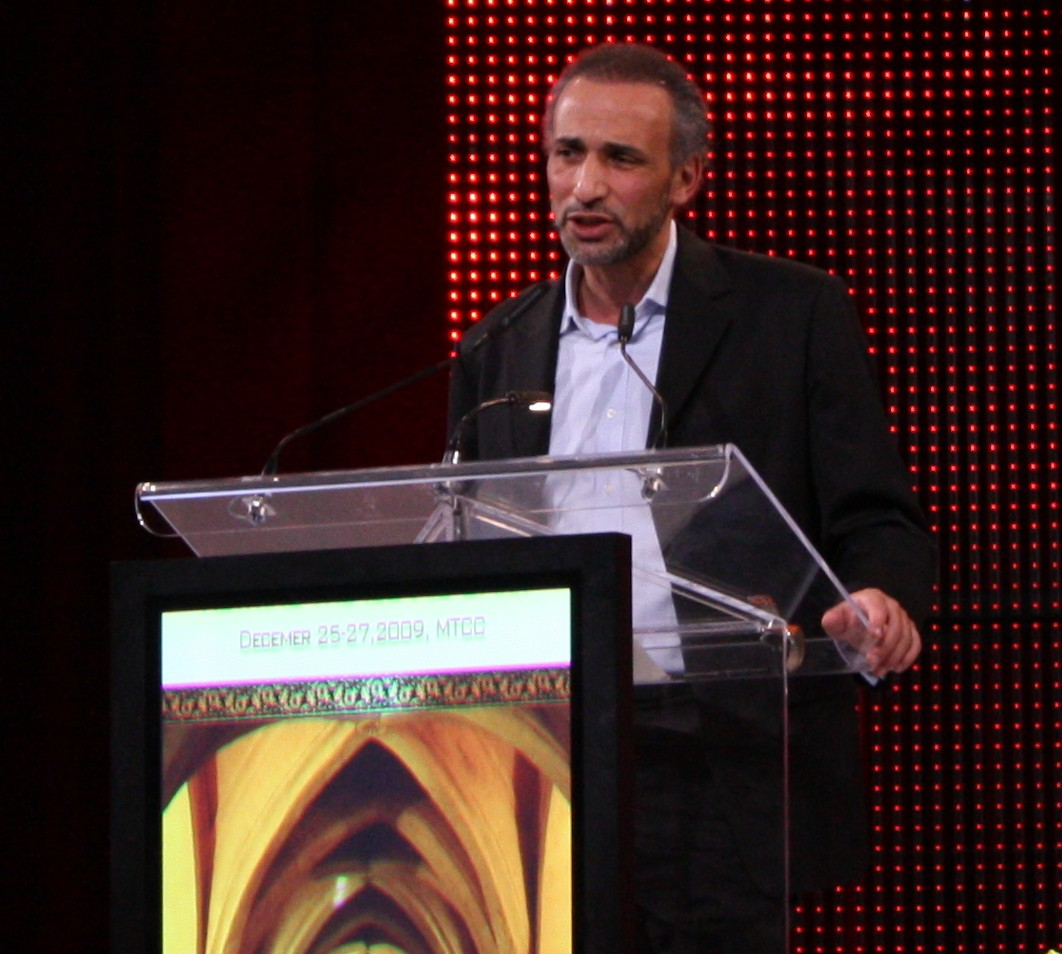
Tariq Ramadan

Criticism from a different ideological direction was voiced by Tariq Ramadan, who is considered a pioneer of the idea of Euro-Islam. In his 2003 book "Muslims of the West and the Future of Islam" (Musulmans d'Occident et l'avenir de l'Islam), he rejected the idea that Muslims living in the West are minorities, which is assumed in the minority fiqh. With regard to the universality of the values represented by Islam, he believed that Muslims should not think of their presence in Western societies in terms of a "minority". He said that the status of minority was not a natural category, but the result of a certain political conception that sought to restrict Muslim freedom of action, while Muslims should actually see themselves as part of the "ethical majority".

Ramadan also criticized the subtitle of al-Qaradāwī's book, which speaks of the "life of Muslims in the midst of other societies". This implies that Western societies are different, foreign societies for the Muslims who live there. Western Muslims, however, are at home in these societies and should not perceive these societies as foreign societies.

=== Defense of the concept by FCNA and ECFR ===
The Fiqh Council of North America also had to deal with criticism of the minority fiqh. According to a collective fatwa published on the internet platform Islamonline.net in December 2003, some Muslim scholars regarded this concept as an unacceptable innovation that "manipulates the religion of Allah". Two scholars of the Fiqh Council, Tāhā al-ʿAlwānī and Muhammad Nur Abdullah, and the aforementioned scholar Muhammad Al-Mukhtar Al-Shinqiti defended the concept against this criticism and emphasized that it in no way touched or altered the foundations of the religion. Al-Shinqiti particularly rejected the accusation that fiqh al-aqallīyāt was a bidʿa, an innovation that contradicted the Sunnah: "The fiqh of the Muslim minorities is not an innovation. The earlier books of jurisprudence contain numerous rules concerning Muslims living in non-Islamic countries. The only thing that is new is the term used for such rules, namely 'Fiqh of Muslim minorities'. However, there is nothing wrong with the change of terms."

The ECFR was also faced with the task of defending the concept. At the twelfth ECFR meeting, which took place in Dublin from December 31, 2003, to January 4, 2004, the concept was discussed in detail over the course of a day. Relevant studies by six members of the ECFR were discussed: Yūsuf al-Qaradāwī, ʿAbdallāh ibn Baiya, Tāhā Jābir al-ʿAlwānī, ʿAbd al-Majīd an-Najjār, al-ʿArabī al-Bishrī and Salāh ad-Dīn Sultān. The Maliki scholar ʿAbdallāh ibn Baiya, who teaches in Saudi Arabia, had already given a series of lectures on minority fiqh at the Zaytuna Institute in Berkeley in 2001. These lectures, known as the Rihla Class, were distributed in the form of 18 CDs by Alhambra Productions. In his contribution to the ECFR conference, he discussed the difference between necessity and need, responding to critics of the ECFR fatwa on the permissibility of taking out an interest-bearing loan, who accused the committee of misinterpreting it. In his contribution, the Egyptian scholar Salāh ad-Dīn Sultān, who lives in Bahrain, presented methodological rules for minority fiqh and also emphasized the responsibility of Muslim minorities for the improvement of the countries in which they live. The study by al-ʿAlwānī consists only of an expanded version of his book from 2000 with a preface.

At the end of the meeting, the committee - probably in response to Tariq Ramadan's criticism - reaffirmed the use of the term "minority" (aqallīya), citing "international custom" (al-ʿurf ad-daulī). The ECFR defined fiqh al-aqallīyāt relatively neutrally as "the normative scientific provisions that relate to Muslims living outside Islamic countries". Most of the studies submitted to the committee (Sultān, al-ʿAlwānī, Ibn Baiya, Nadjār and al-Bishrī) were published in the ECFR journal in the same year.

=== The AMSS Conference 2004 ===
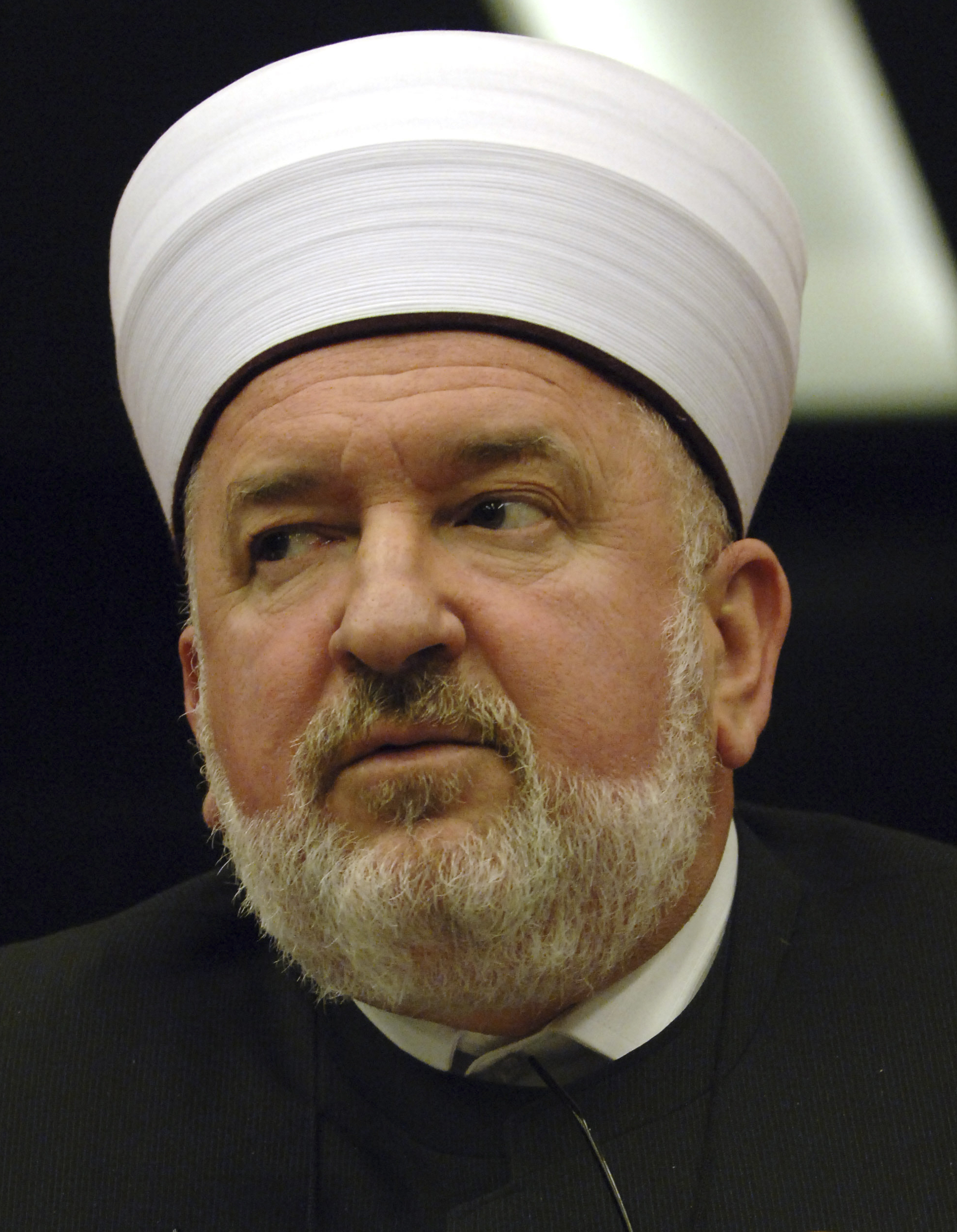
Mustafa Cerić

Shortly after the ECFR conference, in February 2004, the British branch of the Association of Muslim Social Scientists (AMSS [UK]), in conjunction with the International Institute of Islamic Thought (IIIT), the Muslim College and Q-News Media, hosted its fifth annual conference at the University of Westminster and dedicated it to the topic "Fiqh Today: Muslims as Minorities". At this conference, minority fiqh was in part viewed very critically. Although AMSS Chairman Anas Al-Shaikh-Ali called on the participants to work towards a "comprehensive methodology for minority fiqh" in his opening speech, Mustafa Cerić, Grand Mufti of Bosnia and Herzegovina, who was invited as a keynote speaker, opened his keynote address by saying that he did not believe in minority fiqh because he did not want to be seen as only half a Muslim due to his minority status.

The Syrian-American scholar Louay Safi, who gave a lecture on "The Creative Mission of Muslim Minorities in the West", said that "minority fiqh" is actually a misnomer, because the need to overcome historical interpretations of Islamic law exists not only among Muslim minorities in the West, but among all Muslims.

The Tunisian-French thinker Mohamed Mestiri gave a lecture entitled "From the Fiqh of Minorities to the Fiqh of Citizenship". In it, he suggested that Muslim scholars should move away from the concept of minority fiqh, which is too closely tied to an immigrant mentality, and turn to a "fiqh of citizenship". The aim of this new fiqh is "to integrate the philosophy of citizenship in the West in order to create a new fiqh in a plural sphere" and "to take into account the principle of humanism based on the equality of all human beings". In this way, the marginal status of an immigrant with an incompatible order could be transformed into that of a fully-fledged citizen. Instead of a "culture of fatwas", the aim is to develop a "culture of finality".

The concept of minority fiqh was only defended at the conference by al-ʿAlwānī. However, he was not present at the conference himself, but had pre-recorded his lecture in the form of a video presentation. The British convert Charles Le Gai Eaton called for the creation of a new minority fiqh that would be much simpler than what had previously been considered, because otherwise Muslim youth in the West would turn away from Islam.

=== The criticism of Hizb ut-Tahrir (2004) ===
In 2004, Asif Khan (born 1977), a high-ranking member of the Islamist organization Hizb ut-Tahrir in Great Britain, also published a treatise on the Internet in which he rejected the minority fiqh as an attempt to infiltrate Islam. The 44-page treatise consists of two parts: The first part rejects the view that there is a need for a minority fiqh, while the second part challenges the foundations of political participation and integration. Asif Khan took particular offense at the fact that the proponents of fiqh al-aqallīyāt consider it permissible for a woman who converts to Islam to remain married to her non-Muslim husband. In his opinion, this contradicts the Quranic rule in Sura 60:10, and changing this rule leads to reprehensibility (munkar).

Furthermore, Asif Khan also rejected the doctrine of the five universal "purposes of Sharia" (maqāṣid aš-šarīʿa), on which the proponents of minority fiqh rely. These five universal purposes, namely the protection of religion, life, intellect, lineage and property, are indeed purposes of the Shari'ah as a whole, but not of the individual provisions, and therefore cannot be used to legitimize specific individual acts. Another key concept of minority fiqh questioned by Asif Khan is that of citizenship. He argues that accepting citizenship of a non-Muslim state should not lead to the modification of Sharia law or Muslims fighting against Muslims as part of a non-Muslim army because this is contrary to Islam. In his concluding remarks, Asif Khan summed up that the minority fiqh was "the symptom of a corrupt thought process" that "looks to the dominant West for its solutions".

Kamal El-Helbawy was one of the supporters of minority fiqh in the UK. In an interview he gave to a representative of the Jamestown Foundation at the end of July 2005, he suggested creating treatment centers in Britain for young Muslim extremists to teach them about the Sīra of Muhammad, minority fiqh and the role of the West in the development of human civilization.

=== Statements from the Arabian Peninsula ===
The Secretary General of the Muslim World League, ʿAbdallāh at-Turkī, expressed similar criticism of fiqh al-aqallīyāt in 2005. In a foreword to the journal of the Islamic Fiqh Academy, which is affiliated with the World League, he castigated the attempt to create a separate fiqh for Muslim minorities with dispensational fatwas as a phenomenon of a general "disturbance" (iḫtilāl). He warned that the legitimate principle of facilitation, which is based on predicaments and needs, should not lead to a permanent suspension of Islamic rules.

The International Islamic Fiqh Academy (IIFA) in Jeddah, which is affiliated with the Organization of Islamic Cooperation, also took an indirect stance on minority fiqh. In April 2005, it published a resolution in which it called for the use of the term "minority" for Muslims living outside the Islamic world to be avoided, because it is a term of secular law that does not express the reality of Islamic existence, "which is characterized by universality, authenticity, stability and coexistence with other societies." Only expressions such as "Muslims in the West" or "Muslims outside the Islamic world" are appropriate. The formation of a Sharia law commission within the academy was also recommended, which would be tasked with finding solutions to the fiqh problems faced by Muslims outside the Islamic world. The adoption of the decision was preceded by extensive discussions within the committee, in which 25 Islamic scholars from various countries took part. The rejection of the concept of minorities in the resolution was based on a lecture by the Libyan scholar Muhammad Fathallāh az-Ziyādī, in which he argued that "minority" was a term borrowed from the West that implied certain power relations ("weak minority" versus "strong majority") and included the possibility of discrimination, division and antagonism.

The fatwa center of the Islamweb.net website operated by the Qatari Ministry of Religion gave a much more positive opinion on fiqh al-aqallīyāt. When asked in March 2006 whether there was a special fiqh for Muslim minorities, it gave an affirmative answer and made it clear that the minority fiqh, like other fiqh branches, was based on the Qur'an and Sunnah, but referred in detail to the universal principles of Sharia, which provide for the elimination of grievances.

=== Ibn Baiyah's New Elaboration of the Minority Fiqh (2007) ===
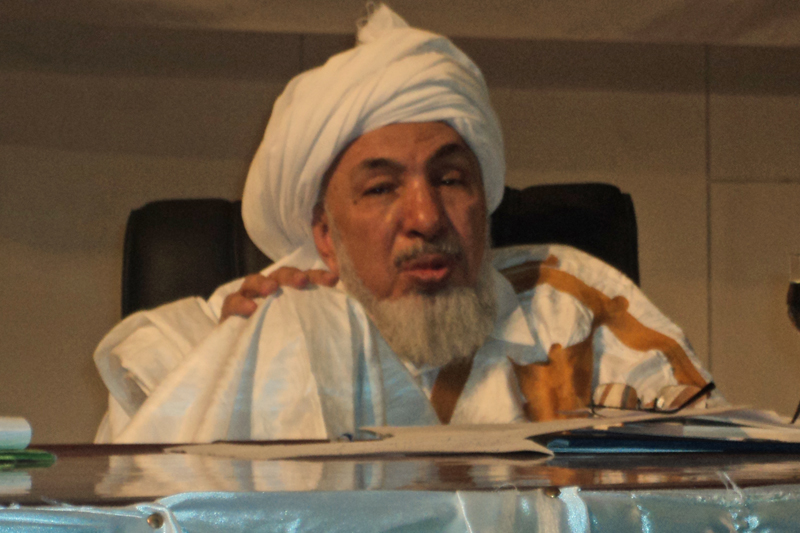
ʿAbdallāh ibn Baiya

Subsequently, the concept continued to be criticized. In August 2007, for example, the Shādhilīya sheikh Nuh Ha Mim Keller stated at the annual gathering of his followers in the United Kingdom that minority fiqh was incompatible with the principle of taqwā, a form of godliness that is primarily cultivated in Sufism. Despite this ongoing criticism, the advocates of minority fiqh initially adhered to the concept. In 2007, the IIIT organized a seminar on "Minority Fiqh and the Purposes of Sharia", which was attended by 25 Islamic activists from around the world. An international conference on the exact same topic was held in Kuala Lumpur in November 2009. It was organized by the World Islamic League and the International Islamic University Malaysia. And the Mauritanian scholar ʿAbdallāh ibn Baiya organized a five-day conference in Cardiff in 2007 on fatwa issuance and minority fiqh, which was attended by 60 Muslim scholars. It was probably at this conference that he presented the contents of his new book, which was published in the same year under the title "The Fatwa-Making and Jurisprudence of Minorities" (Ṣināʿat al-fatwa wa-fiqh al-aqallīyāt).

A special feature of Ibn Baiya's book is that it gives a particularly positive assessment of the Western concept of citizenship. Ibn Baiya recognizes this concept as a reciprocal legal relationship between individuals of a group of people living on the same territory, who do not necessarily have the same ancestors, cultural memory or religion, but are held together solely by a constitution and laws that define the duties and rights of the individual members. This concept, he explains, "is perhaps the most important bridge to ensuring that the religious values of each group of people are respected and accepted, and is consistent with the Islamic understanding of human coexistence. The Muslim has no objection to it, and could even advocate it."

In Ibn Baiya's view, many things associated with citizenship are also "required by religion and desired by nature". These include "the right to life, justice, equal treatment, freedoms, protection of property, protection from arbitrary imprisonment and torture, the right to social security for the poor, the elderly and the sick, cooperation between individual members of society for the common good, as well as related duties such as paying taxes, defending the homeland against aggression and obeying the law".

Ibn Baiya also recognizes the values of "neutral secularism" (al-ʿilmānīya al-muḥāyida) as positive. For him, this includes respect for religious beliefs, religious neutrality, the recognition of individual and collective human rights, the protection of which is overseen by the state, the right to dissent, diversity and deviation from the characteristics of individuals and groups, etc. All of this, according to Ibn Baiya, does not contradict the great values of the revealed religions, especially not the values of the Islamic religion, "which calls for kindness, charity and brotherhood between people." Therefore, in his opinion, loyalty (al-walāʾ) to a Western state is not incompatible with loyalty to religion. Although devotion to God, his messenger and his book is an undeniable necessity, this should not form an exclusive "wall" that excludes any worldly relationship with other people. Rather, it is necessary to cooperate with people in the pursuit of common interests and the averting of disastrous things, to exchange friendly affections with them and to maintain good relations with them, in accordance with the call in Sura 2:83: "Speak only good to people!"

The Saudi scholar Salmān al-ʿAuda, who made minority fiqh the subject of a program on his talk show al-Ḥayāt kalima ("Life is a Word") on MBC in October 2010, praised Ibn Baiya's book as "one of the best books written on this subject".

=== Shift in the discourse ===
In general, it can be observed that the advocates of minority fiqh in Europe turned away from the concept of the minority towards the end of the first decade of the 21st century and turned their interest more towards the concept of citizenship (muwāṭana). Alexandre Caeiro attributes this to the influence of Tariq Ramadan's criticism. ʿAbd al-Majīd an-Najjār published a book in 2009 entitled "Jurisprudence of Citizenship" (Fiqh al-muwāṭana). In it, he stated that the implications attached to the concept of minorities had prompted him to rename his book Fiqh al-muwāṭana. Basically, however, Fiqh al-aqallīyāt and Fiqh al-muwātana are the same thing. At the Institut Européen des Sciences Humaines (European Institute of Human Sciences) in Paris, the course that Ahmad Jaballah regularly gave there on minority fiqh was renamed "Fiqh of the Muslim Presence in Europe" (Fiqh al-ḥuḍūr al-islāmī fī Ūrūbbā) in 2010. The syllabus now no longer contained al-Qaradāwī's book on fiqh al-aqallīyāt, but various books on the concept of citizenship, Islam in the West and the fatwas of the ECFR and other fiqh councils. Al-Qaradāwī himself published a book in 2010 on "Homeland and Citizenship in the Light of the Foundations of Faith and the Purposes of Sharia" (al-Waṭan wa-l-Muwāṭana fī ḍauʾ al-uṣūl al-ʿaqadīya wa-l-maqāṣid aš-šarʿīyya), in which he no longer spoke of the minority fiqh.

The debate on minority fiqh is currently experiencing a late bloom in Israel. There, Iyad Zahalka, Qādī at the Sharia Court of Jerusalem, has spoken out in favor of establishing a minority fiqh for Muslims in Israel. Two other scholars, Mohanad Mustafa and Ayman K. Agbaria, on the other hand, have questioned the suitability of this concept for the Palestinian-Israeli context, firstly because of the political situation prevailing in Israel and secondly because of the indigenous nature of the Palestinian Arab minority.

As far as the European context is concerned, the British Muslim scholar Shahrul Hussain once again criticized in 2016, with reference to the ECFR fatwa on buying a house by means of an interest-bearing loan, that it is unclear what the paradigm of minority fiqh can achieve that is not already secured by normal Islamic legal methodology and Islamic legal maxims.

== Assessment of the concept outside Islamic scholarship ==
Overall, the concept of minority fiqh has been received very positively in Western academia as an attempt to adapt Islam to the European or Western context. As early as 2005, the religious scholar Gritt Klinkhammer characterized fiqh al-aqallīyāt as "one of the traditional ways of integration". The concept is interpreted in a similar way by Alexandre Caeiro in his dissertation "Fatwas for European Muslims: the minority fiqh project and the integration of Islam in Europe", defended in 2011, which is one of the most important studies on the minority fiqh debate. Caeiro describes the minority fiqh "as an attempt to provide an authoritative interpretation of the Islamic tradition in the context of migration and social change". He believes that this debate links directly to the integration debate that dominates the discourse on Islam in Western Europe. The impression that increasing Islamophobia in Europe makes the integration of Muslims impossible has accordingly led to a decline in interest in the concept since 2010.

In their publications, many other academics also emphasize the contribution that minority fiqh can make to the integration of Muslim minorities in Europe and America (Taha 2013, Houot 2014, Kazemipur 2016). In two studies, Uriya Shavit has shown that the fiqh al-aqallīyāt advocated by the ECFR is diametrically opposed to the Salafi concept of al-Walā' wa-l-barā', which encourages Muslims to keep their distance from non-Muslims (Shavit 2012, 2015). Y. Matsuyama, who wrote a master's thesis on minority fiqh at the Tokyo University of Foreign Studies, focuses on the function that this concept has for Islamic scholars themselves. In her view, fiqh al-aqallīyāt is "one of the most effective goods invented by the ʿUlamā' to [...] regain their authority in the highly competitive religious market of Islam, especially in Muslim minority societies".

Since 2007, the minority fiqh has been the subject of a number of qualification papers at universities in Europe (in addition to Caeiro 2011, Remien 2007, Schlabach 2009, Albrecht 2010, Rafeek 2012), North America (Dogan 2015) and Japan (Matsuyama 2010). A special feature of German publications on fiqh al-aqallīyāt is that the term is usually translated as "minority law" (e.g. Schlabach and Albrecht). Since the Arabic term fiqh does not mean "law", but "understanding, knowledge, jurisprudence", and that Tāhā al-ʿAlwānī particularly emphasized the general epistemological character of fiqh in Fiqh al-aqallīyāt, the question arises as to whether this translation is appropriate.

== Bibliography ==
Arabic and English basic texts

- Ašraf ʿAbd-al-ʿĀṭī: Fiqh al-aqallīyāt al-muslima bain an-naẓarīya wa-t-taṭbīq. Dār al-Kalima li-n-Našr wa-t-Tauzīʿ, al-Manṣūra 2008.
- Ḫālid Muḥammad ʿAbd al-Qādir: Min fiqh al-aqallīyāt. Wizārat al-auqāf wa-š-šuʾūn al-islāmīya, Doha 1997 – engl. under the title Jurisprudence for Muslim minorities. Ministry of Al Awqaf, Supreme Council for Islamic Affairs, Kairo 2003.
- Ḫālid Muḥammad ʿAbd-al-Qādir: Fiqh al-aqallīyāt al-muslima. Dār al-Īmān, Ṭarābulus 1998.
- Ṭāhā Ǧābir al-ʿAlwānī: Madḫal ilā fiqh al-aqallīyāt. In: Islāmīyat al-maʿrifa. 19 (Winter 1999/2000) 9–29. PDF – extended version al-Maǧalla al-ʿilmīya li-l-Maǧlis al-urūbbī li-l-iftāʾ wa-l-buḥūṯ. 4–5 (2004) 44–92.
- Ṭāhā Ǧābir al-ʿAlwānī: Fī fiqh al-aqalliyyāt al-Muslima. Nahḍat Miṣr, al-Ǧīza 2000.
- Ṭāhā Ǧābir al-ʿAlwānī: Towards a Fiqh for minorities: some basic reflections. Translated from the Arabic by Ashur A. Shamis, International Institute of Islamic Thought, London [u. a.] 2003. PDF der Version von 2010 (English version with new preface and concluding remarks)
- Ǧamāl ad-Dīn ʿAṭīya Muḥammad: Naḥwa fiqh ǧadīd li-l-aqallīyāt. In: Al-Umma fī qarn. (Special edition of the magazine Ḥaulīyat Ummatī fī l-ʿālam. 2000/2001) Bd. V, S. 7–105. PDF – Reprinted as a separate book by Dār as-Salām, Kairo 2003. PDF
- Jasser Auda (Hrsg.): Rethinking Islamic law for minorities. Towards a Western-Muslim identity. n. d., hier einsehbar.
- Muṣṭafā Muḥammad Ḥasan Dūmān: Ḍawābiṭ al-ḍarūrah aš-šarʿīya wa-taṭbīquhā ʿalā fiqh al-aqallīyāt al-Muslimah fī Urūbbā. Dār Ibn Ḥazm li-ṭ-Ṭibāʿa wa-n-Našr wa-t-Tauzīʿ, Beirut 2013.
- Ismāʿīl al-Ḥasanī: Qirāʾa fī bunyat fiqh al-aqallīyāt. In: Maǧallat Islāmīyat al-Maʿrifa. 30 (Herbst 2002) 119–144. PDF
- ʿAbdallāh Ibn-aš-Šaiḫ al-Maḥfūẓ Ibn-Baiya: Ṣināʿat al-fatwā wa-fiqh al-aqallīyāt. Dār al-Minhāǧ, Ǧidda 2007 – erw. Aufl. Ar-Rābiṭa al-Muḥammadīya li-l-ʿUlamāʾ, [ar-Ribāṭ], 2012. – Online-Version mit anderer Paginierung
- Nuh Ha Mim Keller: Which of the four orthodox madhhabs has the most developed fiqh for Muslims living as minorities. Originally published in Q-News. The Muslim Magazine. 1995.
- Asif Khan: The Fiqh of Minorities: The New Fiqh to Subvert Islam. Khilafah Publications, London 2004, ISBN 1 899 574 344 Online-Version
- Midḥat Māhir: Ǧadīd fiqh al-aqallīyāt fī mauḍūʿ al-marʾa. In: ʿAbd-al-Ḥamīd Abū-Sulaimān u. a. (Hrsg.): Murāǧaʿa fī ḫiṭābāt muʿāṣira ḥaula al-marʾa: naḥw manẓūr ḥaḍārī. Kullīyat al-Iqtiṣād wa-'l-ʿUlūm as-Siyāsīya, Giza 2007, p. 37–100.
- Nādya Maḥmūd Muṣṭafā: Fiqh al-aqallīyāt al-muslima baina fiqh al-indimāǧ (al-muwāṭana) wa-fiqh al-ʿuzla: qirāʾa siyāsīya fī wāqiʿ al-muslimīn fī Ūrūbbā. PDF
- ʿAbd al-Maǧīd an-Naǧǧār: Naḥwa manhaǧ uṣūlī li-fiqh al-aqallīyāt. In: al-Maǧalla al-ʿilmīya li-l-maǧlis al-Urūbbī li-l-iftāʾ wa-l-buḥūṯ. 3 (2003) 41–64.
- ʿAbd al-Maǧīd an-Naǧǧār: Fiqh al-muwāṭana li-l-Muslimīn fī Urūbbā. ECFR 2009, p. 129–208. Digitalisat
- ʿUǧail Ǧāsim an-Našamī: At-Taʿlīqāt ʿalā baḥṯ 'Madḫal ilā uṣūl wa-fiqh al-aqallīyāt' li-l-ustāḏ ad-duktūr Tāhā Ǧābir al-ʿAlwānī. In: al-Maǧalla al-ʿilmīya li-l-Maǧlis al-urūbbī li-l-iftāʾ wa-l-buḥūṯ. 7 (2005) 17–63.
- Yūsuf al-Qaraḍāwī: Fī fiqh al-aqallīyāt al-Muslima: ḥayāt al-Muslimīn wasṭ al-muǧtamaʿāt al-uḫrā. Dār aš-Šurūq, Kairo 2001, ISBN 977-09-0735-9 Digitalisat – englische Teilübersetzung unter dem Titel Fiqh of Muslim minorities: contentions issues & recommended solutions. Al-Falah Foundation, Cairo 2003. Digitalisat
- Ṣalāḥ ad-Dīn ʿA. Sulṭān: aḍ-Ḍawābiṭ al-manhaǧīya li-l-iǧtihād fī fiqh al-aqallīyāt al-muslima. Sulṭān, Kairo 2005.
- Sulaimān Muḥammad Tūbūlyāk: al-Aḥkām as-siyāsīya li-l-aqalliyāt al-muslima fī l-fiqh al-islāmī. Dār an-Nafāʾis, Dār al-Bayāriq, Amman, Beirut 1997

Secondary literature

- Sarah Albrecht: Islamisches Minderheitenrecht. Yūsuf al-Qaraḍāwīs Konzept des fiqh al-aqallīyāt. Ergon-Verl., Würzburg 2010, ISBN 978-3-89913-753-8.
- Zainab Alwani: Maqasid Qur'aniyya: A Methodology on Evaluating Modern Challenges and Fiqh al-Aqalliyyat. In: The Muslim World. 104 (2014) 465–487.
- Abdessamad Belhaj: Minority Fiqh. In: Emad El-Din Shahin, Peri J. Bearman, Sohail H. Hashmi, Khaled Keshk, Joseph A. Kechichian (Hrsg.): The Oxford Encyclopedia of Islam and Politics. Oxford University Press, Oxford, 2014. Bd. II, p. 54a–57a.
- Alexandre Caeiro: The Power of European Fatwas: The Minority Fiqh Project and the Making of an Islamic Counterpublic. In: International Journal of Middle East Studies. 42 (2010) 435–449.
- Alexandre Caeiro: Fatwas for European Muslims: the minority fiqh project and the integration of Islam in Europe. Dissertation, Universität Utrecht, 2011, Digitalisat
- Alexandre Caeiro: Minorities, Jurisprudence of. In: Gerhard Böwering (Hrsg.): The Princeton Encyclopedia of Islamic Political Thought. Princeton University Press, Princeton NJ 2013, p. 346a–348a.
- Okan Dogan: Rethinking Islamic Jurisprudence for Muslim Minorities in the West. M.A. Thesis, University of Texas, 2015. PDF
- Shammai Fishman: Fiqh al-Aqalliyyat: A Legal Theory for Muslim Minorities. Hudson Institute, Washington D.C. 2006. Online-Version
- Ralph Ghadban: Fiqh al-aqalliyyat and its Place in Islamic Law. In: Orient. 51 (2010) 56–63.
- Said Fares Hassan: Fiqh al-aqalliyyāt: history, development, and progress. Palgrave Macmillan, New York 2013, ISBN 978-1-137-34669-8.
- Sandra Houot: De l’apport du droit des minorités (fiqh al-aqalliyyât) et de ses applications éthico-morales: adapter l’islam en contexte européen. In: Amin Elias u. a. (Hrsg.): Laïcités et musulmans, débats et expériences: (XIXe – XXe siècles). Lang, Bern u. a. 2014, S. 99–121.
- Abdolmohammad Kazemipur: John Porter Book Prize Lecture: Bringing the Social Back In – On the Integration of Muslim Immigrants and the Jurisprudence of Muslim Minorities. In: Canadian Review of Sociology. 53/4 (2016) 437–456.
- Rüdiger Lohlker: Fiqh of Minorities in the European Context: A New Approach in the Field of Islamic Jurisprudence. In: Astrid Hafner, Sabine Kroissenbrunner, Richard Potz (Hrsg.): State, Law and Religion in Pluralistic Societies – Austrian and Indonesian Perspectives. Austrian and Indonesian Dialogue Symposium, 27–29 May 2009, Vienna. V&R Unipress, Göttingen 2010, S. 93–98.
- Abdul-Rehman Malik: The AMSS (UK) Fifth Annual Conference: Fiqh Today: Muslims as Minorities. In: The American journal of Islamic social sciences. 21/2 (2004) 144–146.
- Andrew March: Sources of moral obligation to non-muslims in the ‘Jurisprudence of Muslim minorities’ (Fiqh al-aqalliyyāt) discourse. In: Islamic Law and Society. 16 (2009) 34–94.
- Andrew March: Are Secularism and Neutrality Attractive to Religious Minorities? Islamic Discussions of Western Secularism in the ‘Jurisprudence of Muslim Minorities’ (Fiqh Al-Aqalliyyat) Discourse. In: Cardozo law review. 30/6 (2009) 2821–2854. Digitalisat – Wiederabdruck in Susanna Mancini und Michel Rosenfeld, Constitutional secularism in an age of religious revival. Oxford Univ. Press, Oxford [u. a.] 2014, p. 283–310.
- Muhammad Khalid Masud: Islamic Law and Muslim Minorities. In: ISIM Newsletter. 11 (2002) 11 (2002): 17 Online-Version
- Yohei Matsuyama: Fiqh al-Aqalliyat: development, advocates and social meaning. In: AJAMES: Annals of Japan Association for Middle East Studies – Nihon-Chūtō-Gakkai-nenpō. 26,2 (2010) 33–55.
- Tauseef Ahmad Parray: The Legal Methodology of Fiqh Al-Aqalliyyat and its Critics: an Analytical Study. In: Journal of Muslim minority affairs. 32/1 (2012) 88–107.
- M. M. M. Rafeek: Fiqh al-Aqalliyyat (jurisprudence for minorities) and the problems of contemporary Muslim minorities of Britain from the perspective of Islamic jurisprudence. Ph.D. Thesis, University of Portsmouth 2012. PDF
- Florian Remien: Muslime in Europa: Westlicher Staat und islamische Identität. Untersuchung zu Ansätzen von Yūsuf al-Qaraḍāwī, Tariq Ramadan und Charles Taylor. EB-Verlag, Schenfeld 2007, p. 49–57.
- Umar Ryad: A Prelude to Fiqh al-Aqalliyyât: Rashîd Ridâ’s Fatwâs to Muslims under non-Muslim Rule. In: Christiane Timmerman (Hrsg.): In-between spaces: Christian and Muslim minorities in transition in Europe and the Middle East. Lang, Bruxelles 2009, p. 239–270.
- Jörg Schlabach: Scharia im Westen: Muslime unter nicht-islamischer Herrschaft und die Entwicklung eines muslimischen Minderheitenrechts für Europa. Lit Verlag, Berlin 2009.
- Uriya Shavit: The Wasati and Salafi Approaches to the Religious Law of Muslim Minorities. In: Islamic Law and Society. 19 (2012) 416–457.
- Uriya Shavit: Shariʿa and Muslim Minorities: The Wasaṭī and Salafī Approaches to Fiqh al-Aqalliyyat al-Muslima. Oxford University Press, Oxford 2015, ISBN 978-0-19-875723-8
- Uriya Shavit und Iyad Zahalka: A Religious Law for Muslims in the West: The European Council for Fatwa and Research and the Evolution of Fiqh al-Aqalliyyat al-Muslima. In: Roberto Tottoli (Hrsg.): Routledge Handbook of Islam in the West. Routledge, London 2014, p. 365–377.
- Dina Taha: Muslim Minorities in the West: Between Fiqh of Minorities and Integration. In: Electronic Journal of Islamic and Middle Eastern Law. 1 (2013) 1–36.
- Alan Verskin: Oppressed in the land? Fatwās on Muslims living under non-Muslim rule from the Middle Ages to the present. Wiener, Princeton, NJ, 2013, ISBN 1-55876-571-9, p. 113–148.
