= Taqiyya =

Denial of affiliation with Islam in the face of imminent danger to life and limb

In Islam, Taqiyya (Arabic: تقیة, romanized: taqīyya, lit. 'prudence') is the practice of concealing one's faith or religious identity to protect oneself from danger. Although the practice is mainly associated with the minority Shia tradition, it is also considered legitimate under certain conditions in Sunni sources. While the threshold for practicing taqiyya varies historically and theologically between Islamic branches – with Sunni jurisprudence generally restricting it to acute, credible threats of death or severe torture – there are conditions, requirements and boundaries across all branches. A concept related to taqiyya is kitmān (lit. 'action of covering' or 'dissimulation'), which has the more specific meaning of dissimulation by silence or omission.

The practice of concealing one's beliefs has existed since the early days of Islam; early Muslims, including some of Muhammad's companions, did so to avoid persecution or violence by non-Muslim governments or individuals. The use of taqiyya has varied in recent history, especially between Sunni and Shiʿa Muslims. Sunni Muslims gained political supremacy over time and therefore only occasionally felt the need to practice taqiyya. On the other hand, Shiʿa Muslims, as well as Sufi Muslims, developed taqiyya as a method of self-preservation and protection in hostile environments. In Shiʿa theology, taqiyya is permissible in situations where life or property are at risk and whereby no danger to religion would occur. Taqiyya has also been politically legitimised in Twelver Shi'ism, to maintain unity among Muslims and fraternity among Shia clerics.

In Sunni jurisprudence (fiqh), outward denial of faith is treated under the categories of unlawful coercion (ikrāh) and dire necessity (ḍarūra), where it is classified strictly as a temporary legal dispensation (rukhṣa) limited to credible threats of death, loss of a limb, or severe torture, whereas steadfastness unto martyrdom (ʿazīma) remains the higher moral ideal. Even under mortal duress, both Sunni and Shiʿa legal consensus (ijmāʿ) place absolute limits on dissimulation, strictly prohibiting acts that cause the death or severe harm of innocent third parties.

== Etymology ==
The term taqiyya is derived from the Arabic triliteral root wāw-qāf-yā denoting "caution, fear", "prudence, guarding against (a danger)", "carefulness, wariness". In the sense of "prudence, fear" it can be used synonymously with the terms tuqa(n), tuqāt, taqwa, and ittiqāʾ, which are derived from the same root. These terms also have other meanings. For example, the term taqwá generally means "piety" (lit. 'fear of God') in an Islamic context.

=== Related terms ===
A related term is kitmān (Arabic: كتمان), the "action of covering, dissimulation". While the terms taqiyya and kitmān may be used synonymously, kitmān refers specifically to the concealment of one's convictions by silence or omission. Kitman derives from Arabic katama "to conceal, to hide". Ibadis used kitmān to conceal their Muslim beliefs in the face of persecution by their enemies.

== Quranic basis ==
In Islamic scholarship, the technical meaning of the term taqiyya is derived from the Quranic reference to precautionary dissimulation in Sura 3:28:

Believers should not take disbelievers as guardians instead of the believers—and whoever does so will have nothing to hope for from Allah—unless it is a precaution against their tyranny. And Allah warns you about Himself. And to Allah is the final return. (illā an tattaqū minhum tuqāt).

— Surah Al Imran 3:28

The two words tattaqū ("you fear" or "you guard yourselves") and tuqāt ("in fear" or "as a precaution", read in a variant canonical reading as taqiyyatan) are derived from the same triliteral root (w-q-y) as taqiyya. Early exegetical traditions linking taqiyya to this passage are recorded in the Ṣaḥīḥ of Muhammad al-Bukhari (citing Ibn ʿAbbas and Hasan al-Basri) in the 9th century.

Regarding 3:28, Ibn Kathir writes, "meaning, except those believers who in some areas or times fear for their safety from the disbelievers. In this case, such believers are allowed to show friendship to the disbelievers outwardly, but never inwardly." He quotes the Companion of the Prophet Abu al-Darda, who said "we smile in the face of some people although our hearts curse them," and Hasan Ibn ʿAli, who said, "the tuqya is acceptable till the Day of Resurrection."

A similar instance of the Qur'an permitting dissimulation under compulsion is found in Surah An-Nahl 16:106 Sunni and Shiʿa commentators alike observe that verse 16:106 refers to the case of ʿAmmar Ibn Yasir, whose parents Yasir and Sumayya were tortured to death in Mecca for refusing to recant Islam, while 'Ammar himself was forced to utter words of unbelief under severe physical duress and torture. In the structure of Surah An-Nahl, this narrow exemption for mortal coercion immediately follows verses 16:91–95, which strictly command Muslims to fulfill their covenants and oaths and forbid using oaths as a means of mutual deception (dakhalan baynakum).

== Sunni view ==
The basic principle of precautionary dissimulation under mortal compulsion (ikrāh) is agreed upon by Sunni scholars, who historically framed it primarily around persecution by non-Muslim authorities (as in early Mecca), whereas Shiʿa jurists also applied it to persecution by hostile Muslim rulers and broader cases of necessity (ḍarūriyāt). In Sunni jurisprudence, protecting one's life during extreme or exigent circumstances falls under the broader legal category of iḍṭirār (اضطرار), which translates to "being driven by dire necessity", a concept not specific to concealing the faith; for example, under the rules of iḍṭirār one is allowed to consume prohibited food (e.g. pork) to avoid starving to death. Additionally, denying one's faith under duress is "only at most permitted and not under all circumstances obligatory".

Al-Tabari comments on sura XVI, verse 106 (Tafsir, Bulak 1323, xxiv, 122): "If any one is compelled and professes unbelief with his tongue, while his heart contradicts him, in order to escape his enemies, no blame falls on him, because God takes his servants as their hearts believe." This verse was recorded after ʿAmmar Ibn Yasir was forced by the idolaters of Mecca to recant his faith and denounce the Islamic prophet Muhammad. Al-Tabari explains that concealing one's faith is only justified if the person is in mortal danger, and even then martyrdom is considered a noble alternative. If threatened, it would be preferable for a Muslim to migrate to a more peaceful place where a person may practice their faith openly, "since God's earth is wide." In the Fath al-Bari by Ibn Hajar al-ʿAsqalani, a Sunni commentary on the hadith collection Sahih al-Bukhari, he quotes Ibn Battal as stating:

أجمعوا على أن من أكره على الكفر واختار القتل أنه أعظم أجرا عند الله ممن اختار الرخصة ، وأما غير الكفر فإن أكره على أكل الخنزير وشرب الخمر مثلا فالفعل أولى

Which translates to:

There is a consensus that whosoever is forced into apostasy and chooses death has a greater reward than a person who takes the license [to deny one's faith under duress], but if a person is being forced to eat pork or drink wine, then they should do that [instead of choosing death].

In his ethical treatise on the prohibition of lying (Kitāb āfāt al-lisān in The Revival of the Religious Sciences), Al-Ghazali addresses the classic ethical dilemma of whether one may speak untruthfully to a tyrant or murderer to save an innocent life:

Safeguarding of a Muslim's life is a mandatory obligation that should be observed; and that lying is permissible when the shedding of a Muslim's blood is at stake.

Ibn Saʿd, in his book at-Tabaqat al-Kubra, narrates on the authority of Ibn Sirin:

The Prophet saw ʿAmmar Ibn Yasir crying, so he wiped off his tears, and said: "The nonbelievers arrested you and immersed you in water until you said such and such (i.e., bad-mouthing the Prophet and praising the pagan gods to escape persecution); if they come back, then say it again."

Jalal ad-Din al-Suyuti, in his legal work al-Ashbah wa-n-Naẓaʾir (under the maxim "necessities render prohibited things permissible", al-ḍarūrāt tubīḥ al-maḥẓūrāt), lists distinct examples of legal exemptions under extreme necessity—such as starvation, choking, mortal coercion, and scarcity of lawful economic subsistence:

It is acceptable (for a Muslim) to eat the meat of a dead animal at a time of great hunger (starvation to the extent that the stomach is devoid of all food); and to loosen a bite of food (for fear of choking to death) by alcohol; and to utter words of unbelief [under mortal compulsion]; and if one is living in an environment where evil and corruption [in financial transactions] are the pervasive norm, and permissible things (Halal) are the exception and a rarity, then one can use whatever is available to fulfill his basic needs.

Jalal al-Din al-Suyuti, in his book al-Durr al-Manthur Fi al-Tafsir al-Maʾathur, narrates that:

Abd Ibn Hameed, on the authority of al-Hassan, said: "al-Taqiyya is permissible until the Day of Judgment."

The practice of taqiyya is not limited to any one sect within Islam. It is observed and referenced in Sunni texts of law, hadith collections, and Quranic exegesis. Although historically more extensively practiced and referenced by Shiʿi Muslims, taqiyya is doctrinally available to Sunni Muslims under extreme duress as well. This challenges the negative notion that taqiyya is exclusively associated with one community or confined to a specific group.

=== Legal thresholds and absolute limits under mortal duress ===
Classical Sunni exegetes and jurists across the four schools of law (madhāhib) stipulate that the dispensation (rukhṣa) to utter words of unbelief applies exclusively under "compelling coercion" (ikrāh muljiʾ), defined as an immediate, credible threat of death, loss of a bodily organ, or severe physical torture from which the victim cannot escape. Non-compelling coercion (ikrāh ghayr muljiʾ)—such as tolerable imprisonment, non-lethal captivity, confiscation of property, or social disadvantage—does not justify outward renunciation of faith, while steadfastness unto martyrdom (ʿazīma) remains the higher moral ideal. Whenever possible, Sunni jurists advise someone under mortal threat to employ ambiguous statements or double entendres (tawriya or maʿārīḍ) rather than explicit expressions of unbelief, and the dispensation ends immediately once the coercion ceases.

Even when acute mortal danger (ikrāh muljiʾ) is present, the dispensation in Sunni law is not unrestricted. By scholarly consensus (ijmāʿ), the exemption is strictly confined to verbal utterances, the omission of ritual obligations (such as prayer or fasting), and the consumption of prohibited substances to preserve life. Active transgressions against the lives and inviolable rights of third parties remain strictly forbidden (ḥarām) under all circumstances. Across all Sunni schools of law, a Muslim is never permitted—even under immediate threat of being killed—to murder an innocent person, inflict severe bodily harm or amputation on another, commit grave sexual offenses (such as rape or zinā), or bear false witness leading to the execution of a third party, based on the legal principle that saving one's own life cannot be achieved by taking or destroying the life of another.

=== Niyya ===
In Sunni Islamic law, as in Islamic law in general, the concept of intention (niyya) holds great importance. Merely performing an act without the right intention is considered insufficient. A fatwa issued by Ibn Abi Juma highlights the significance of one's inner state and intention in determining their identity as a Muslim. According to this fatwa, if taqiyya is practiced with the right intention, it is not considered sinful but rather a pious act. The fatwa emphasizes that God values the intention of believers over their outward actions, and taqiyya can be seen as a form of outward expression aligned with the correct intention.

=== Examples ===
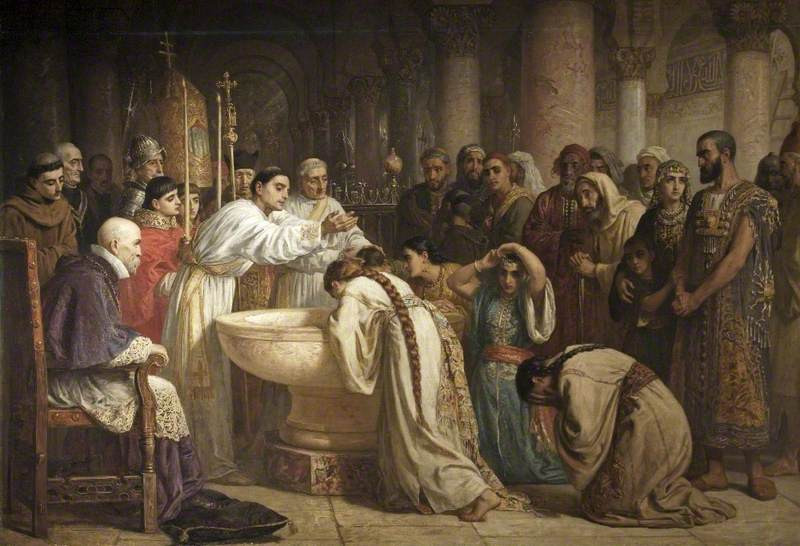
A 19th-century painting of a mass baptism of Moors in 1500. Muslim clerics permitted them to use taqiyya and become outwardly Christian, to save their lives.

When Maʿmun became caliph (813 AD), he tried to impose his religious views on the status of the Qur'an over all his subjects, in an ordeal called the Mihna, or "inquisition". His views were disputed, and many of those who refused to follow his views were imprisoned, tortured, or threatened with the sword. Some Sunni scholars chose to affirm Mamun's view that the Qurʾan was created, in spite of their beliefs, though a notable exception to this was scholar and theologian Ahmad Ibn Hanbal, who chose to endure torture instead.

Following the end of the Reconquista of the Iberian Peninsula in 1492, Muslims were persecuted by the Catholic Monarchs and forced to convert to Christianity or face expulsion. The principle of taqiyya became very important for Muslims during the Inquisition in 16th-century Spain, as it allowed them to convert to Christianity while remaining crypto-Muslims, practicing Islam in secret. In 1504, ʿUbayd Allah al-Wahrani, a Maliki mufti in Oran, which is a city in modern-day Algeria, issued a fatwa allowing Muslims to make extensive use of concealment to maintain their faith. This is seen as an exceptional case, since Islamic law prohibits conversion except in cases of mortal danger, and even then requires recantation as quickly as possible, and al-Wahrani's reasoning diverged from that of the majority of earlier Maliki fuqahaʾs such as al-Wansharisi.

== Shia view ==
Minority Shiʿa communities, since the earliest days of Islam, were often forced to practice pious circumspection (taqiyya) as an instinctive method of self-preservation and protection, an obligatory practice in the lands which became known as the realm of pious circumspection (dār al-taqiyya). Therefore, the recurring theme is that during times of danger feigning disbelief is allowed.

Two primary aspects of circumspection became central for the Shi'a: not disclosing their association with the Imams when this could put them in danger and protecting the esoteric teachings of the Imams from those who are unprepared to receive them. While in most instances, minority Shiʿa communities employed taqiyya using the facade of Sunnism in Sunni-dominated societies, the principle also allows for circumspection as other faiths. For instance, Gupti Ismaili Shiʿa communities in the Indian subcontinent circumspect as Hindus to avoid caste persecution. In many cases, the practice of taqiyya became deeply ingrained into practitioners' psyche. If a believer wished, he/she could adopt this practice at moments of danger, or as a lifelong process.

=== Prudential taqiyya ===
Kohlberg has coined the expression "prudential taqiyya" to describe caution due to fear of external enemies. It can be further categorized into two distinct forms: concealment and dissimulation.

For instance, historical accounts narrate how some Imams concealed their identities as a protective measure. In one story, the Imam Jaʿfar al-Sadiq commended the behavior of a follower who chose to avoid direct interaction with the Imam, even though he recognized him on the street, rather than exposing him, and even cursed those who would call him by his name.

Kohlberg identifies the second type of prudential taqiyya as dissimulation, characterized by using deceptive words or actions intended to mislead opponents. It is typically employed by individuals possessing secret information. It is not solely confined to Imami Shi'ism but has been observed among various Muslim individuals or groups with minority views. During times of danger, the recurring theme is that taqiyya permits individuals to utter words of disbelief as a means of self-preservation. Prudential taqiyya is considered essential for safeguarding the faith and may be lifted when the political climate no longer poses a threat. Therefore, one way to discern the motivation behind a specific type of taqiyya is to determine whether it ceases once the danger has subsided.

=== Non-prudential taqiyya ===
Kohlberg coined the expression "non-prudential taqiyya" for when there is a need to conceal secret doctrines from the uninitiated. Non-prudential taqiyya is employed by believers when they possess secret knowledge and are obligated to conceal it from those who have not attained the same level of initiation. This hidden knowledge encompasses diverse aspects, including profound insights into specific Quranic verses, interpretations of the Imam's teachings, and specific religious obligations. The obligation to conceal arises when individuals acquire such exclusive knowledge emphasizing the importance of preserving its secrecy within the initiated community.

=== Twelver Shia view ===
If coupled with mental reservation, religious dissimulation is considered lawful in Twelver Shiʿism whenever life or property is at serious risk. In Twelver theology, taqiyya also refers to hiding or safeguarding the esoteric teachings of Shiʿa imams, a practice intended to "protect the truth from those not worthy of it." This esoteric knowledge (of God), taught by imams to their (true) followers, is said to distinguish them from other Muslims.

Historically, the Twelver doctrine of taqiyya was developed by Muhammad al-Baqir (d. c. 732), the fifth of the twelve imams, and later by his successor, Jaʿfar al-Sadiq (d. 765). At the time, this doctrine was likely intended for the survival of Shia imams and their followers, for they were being brutally molested and persecuted. Indeed, taqiyya is particularly relevant to Twelver Shiʿas, for until about the sixteenth century they lived mostly as a minority among an often-hostile Sunni majority. Traditions attributed to Shiʿa imams thus encourage their followers to hide their faith for their safety, some even characterizing taqiyya as a pillar of faith. Theological and legal statements of Shiʿa imams were also influenced by taqiyya. For instance, Imam Muhammad al-Baqir is not known to have publicly reviled the first two caliphs, namely, Abu Bakr and ʿUmar, most likely because the imam exercised taqiyya. Indeed, al-Baqir's conviction that the Islamic prophet had explicitly designated ʿAli Ibn Abi Talib as his successor implies that Abu Bakr and Umar were usurpers. More generally, whenever contradictory statements are attributed to Shiʿa imams, those that are aligned with Sunni positions are discarded, for Shiʿa scholars argue that such statements must have been uttered under taqiyya. Even within Twelver jurisprudence, however, taqiyya is not unrestricted, but is classified according to the five Islamic legal categories (al-aḥkām al-khamsa). While it is obligatory (wājib) when necessary to save a life from persecution, Twelver jurists (such as Murtada al-Ansari) hold that taqiyya becomes strictly forbidden (ḥarām) if its practice would lead to the killing of an innocent person or the shedding of blood—governed by the legal maxim lā taqiyyata fī d-dam ("there is no taqiyya in bloodshed")—or if it would result in the corruption of the religion itself.

Even within Twelver jurisprudence, however, taqiyya is not unrestricted, but is classified according to the five Islamic legal categories (al-aḥkām al-khamsa). While it is obligatory (wājib) when necessary to save a life from persecution, Twelver jurists (such as Murtada al-Ansari) hold that taqiyya becomes strictly forbidden (ḥarām) if its practice would lead to the killing of an innocent person or the shedding of blood—governed by the legal maxim lā taqiyyata fī d-dam ("there is no taqiyya in bloodshed")—or if it would result in the corruption of the religion itself.

=== Ismaili Shia view ===
For the Ismaʿilis in the aftermath of the Mongol onslaught of the Alamut state in 1256 CE, the need to practice taqiyya became necessary, not only for the protection of the community itself, which was now stateless, but also for safeguarding the line of the Nizari Ismaili Imamate during this period of unrest. Accordingly, the Shiʿa Imam Jaʿfar al-Sadiq stated "Taqiyya is my religion and the religion of my ancestors", a tradition recorded in various sources including Kitāb al-Maḥāsin of Aḥmad b. Muhammad al-Barqī and the Da'ā'im al-Islām of al-Qāḍī al-Nu'mān.

Such periods in which the Imams are concealed are known as satr, however the term may also refer to times when the Imams were not physically hidden from view but rather when the community was required to practice precautionary dissimulation. During satr the Imam could only be accessed by his community and in extremely dangerous circumstances, would be accessible only to the highest-ranking members of the Ismaili hierarchy (ḥudūd), whose function it was to transmit the teachings of the Imam to the community. Jaʿfar al-Sadiq is reputed to have said, "Our teaching is the truth, the truth of the truth; it is the exoteric and the esoteric, and the esoteric of the esoteric; it is the secret and the secret of a secret, a protected secret, hidden by a secret." The Fatimid Imam-Caliph al-Hakim expresses the sentiment of taqiyya when he confides to his followers that "if any religion is stronger than you, follow it, but keep me in your hearts."

According to Shiʿa scholar Muhammad Husain Javari Sabinal, Shiism would not have spread at all if not for taqiyya, referring to instances where Shiʿa have been ruthlessly persecuted by the Sunni political elite during the Umayyad and Abbasid empires. Indeed, for the Ismailis, the persistence and prosperity of the community today owes largely to the careful safeguarding of the beliefs and teachings of the Imams during the Ilkhanate, the Safawid dynasty, and other periods of persecution. The 16th century Ismaʿili author Khwāja Muḥammad Riḍā b. Sulṭān Ḥusayn, also known as Khayrkhvah-i Harati, referring to the Anjudan period, writes about the end of an era of taqiyya. He explains that thus far "a veil was drawn over the visage of truth," but now the Imam "allowed the veil to be lifted". Since the Imam had allowed written correspondence with his followers, he had effectively ended the era of taqiyya.

The Gupti community viewed the Aga Khan III as their spiritual leader and Imam, but concealed these beliefs to protect themselves. However, the Guptis used a unique form of taqiyya, they did not appear as Sunni, Sufi, or Ithna ʿashari, which were the more common identities to take on. Rather they identified as Hindus, and this became a significant aspect of who they were. The Guptis view their taqiyya as a fulfillment and culmination of their outwardly professed faith, rather than contrary to it. The name 'Gupta' in Sanskrit, means secret or hidden, which perfectly embodies the concealment of their faith and true identity.

=== Alawite view ===
ʿAlawite beliefs have never been confirmed by their modern religious authorities. ʿAlawites tend to conceal their beliefs (taqiyya) due to historical persecution. Some tenets of the faith are secret, known only to a select few; therefore, they have been described as a mystical sect. Alawites celebrate Islamic festivals but consider the most important one to be Eid al-Ghadir.

=== Druze view ===
Because of the Druze's Ismaʿili Shiʿa origin, they have also been associated with taqiyya. When the Druze were a minority being persecuted they took the appearance of another religion externally, usually the ruling religion in the area, and for the most part adhered to Muslim customs by this practice.

== Contemporary debate ==
In the early 21st century, taqiyya has frequently been weaponized in political polemics outside Islamic legal discourse. According to scholars such as S. Jonathon O'Donnell and Yarden Mariuma, anti-Muslim writers have popularized "the idea that Muslims have a religious duty to deceive non-Muslims if it furthers the cause" of Islam. O'Donnell argues that the "claim rests on a misreading of the concept of taqiyya, by which believers may conceal their faith if under threat of violence. This misreading is widely deployed in Islamophobic writings." The term has been used by writers and counter-jihadists such as Patrick Sookhdeo, who posit that Muslims use the doctrine as a key strategy in the Islamization of Western countries by hiding their true violent intents.

In 2008 Raymond Ibrahim published in Jane's Islamic Affairs Analyst an article titled "Islam's doctrines of deception". Ibrahim presented his own translation of part of Lebanese Druze scholar Sami Makarem's monograph Al Taqiyya Fi Al Islam ("Dissimulation in Islam"). Ibrahim quoted:

Taqiyya is of fundamental importance in Islam. Practically every Islamic sect agrees to it and practices it. ... We can go so far as to say that the practice of taqiyya is mainstream in Islam, and that those few sects not practicing it diverge from the mainstream. ... Taqiyya is very prevalent in Islamic politics, especially in the modern era.

Michael Ryan, also in Jane's, characterized Ibrahim's article as "well-researched, factual in places but ... ultimately misleading". Academic specialists in Islamic studies have likewise criticized Ibrahim's portrayal for misrepresenting both Makarem's text and classical Islamic law. Devin J. Stewart notes that Makarem's 2004 book was written as an apologetic defense of the esoteric Druze minority against Sunni fundamentalist polemics; to shield the Druze from accusations of heresy and hypocrisy, Makarem conflated distinct legal and historical concepts—such as battlefield feints in active warfare (khudʿa), diplomatic courtesy, Sufi esotericism, and coercion under torture—under the single heading of taqiyya to argue that all Muslims practice it. Ibrahim then extrapolated Makarem's Druze apologetics to portray mainstream Sunni Islam as endorsing systematic deception of non-Muslims. Critics further point out that such polemics ignore the strict prohibition of lying (kadhib) and treachery or breaking covenants (ghadr) in Islamic law, which are condemned as major sins regardless of the religion of the other party.

Ibrahim responded in 2009 with "Taqiyya Revisited: A Response to the Critics", on his blog and on the Middle East Forum website. Ibrahim was again criticised for his view on taqiyya in 2019, by Islamic scholar Usama Hasan in the Jewish Chronicle. Ibrahim also responded to Hasan in a FrontPage Magazine article titled "Taqiyya Sunset: Exposing the Darkness Shrouding Islamic Deceit."

Stefan Wimmer argues that taqiyya is not a tool to deceive non-Muslims and spread Islam, but instead a defensive mechanism to save one's life when it is in great danger (giving the example of the Reconquista). Similar views are shown by Jakob Skovgaard-Petersen from the University of Copenhagen.

Dutch-Palestinian political analyst Mouin Rabbani wrote in a piece that was published by Zeteo: "Prior to the 9/11 terrorist attacks ... and the tsunami of Islamophobia it unleashed, I'd never heard of taqiyya. Nor had any of the Muslims, or those identified as Muslims, that I had encountered before that time." He called the term a "useful term" to dismiss criticism and inconvenient facts.

== See also ==
- Criticism of Twelver Shia Islam
- Crypto-Christianity
- Crypto-Islam
- Crypto-Judaism
- Denial of Peter
- Islamic schools and branches
- Religious views on truth
- Mental reservation
- Islam and Mormonism
- Munafiq
- Self-sacrifice in Jewish law
- Spirit possession and exorcism in Islam

== Sources ==
- Amir-Moezzi, M. A. (1994). The Divine Guide in Early Shi'ism: The Sources of Esotericism in Islam. Translated by Streight, D. State University of New York Press. ISBN 0-7914-2122-8.
- Buckley, R. P. (2020). "Muḥammad al-Bāqir". In Fleet, K.; Krämer, G.; Matringe, D.; Nawas, J.; Stewart, D. J. (eds.). Encyclopaedia of Islam (Three ed.). doi:10.1163/1573-3912_ei3_COM_36641. ISBN 978-90-04-41344-3.
- Clarke, L. (2005). "The Rise and Decline of Taqiyya in Twelver Shi'ism". In Lawson, T. (ed.). Reason and Inspiration in Islam: Essays in Honour of Hermann Landolt. I. B. Tauris. pp. 46–63. ISBN 978-1-85043-470-2.
- Daftary, F. (2013). A History of Shi'i Islam. I. B. Tauris. ISBN 978-0-85772-333-8.
- Gleave, R. (2004). "Taqiyya". In Martin, R. C. (ed.). Encyclopedia of Islam and the Muslim World. Vol. 2. Macmillan Reference. ISBN 0-02-865605-9.
- Jafri, S. H. M. (1979). Origins and Early Development of Shi'a Islam. Longman. ISBN 0-582-78080-2.
- Kohlberg, E. (1995). Secrecy and Concealment. Brill Academic Publishers. ISBN 978-90-04-10235-4.
- Kohlberg, E. (2012). "Muḥammad b. 'Alī Zayn al-'Ābidīn". In Bearman, P.; Bianquis, Th.; Bosworth, C. E.; van Donzel, E.; Heinrichs, W. P. (eds.). Encyclopaedia of Islam (Second ed.). doi:10.1163/1573-3912_islam_SIM_5346. ISBN 978-90-04-16121-4.
- Lalani, A. R. (2000). Early Shī'ī Thought: The Teachings of Imam Muḥammad al-Bāqir. I.B.Tauris. ISBN 1-85043-592-8.
- Mavani, H. (2013). Religious Authority and Political Thought in Twelver Shi'ism: From Ali to Post-Khomeini. Routledge. ISBN 978-0-203-69428-2.
- Strothmann, R.; Djebli, M. (2012). "Taḳiyya". In Bearman, P.; Bianquis, Th.; Bosworth, C. E.; van Donzel, E.; Heinrichs, W. P. (eds.). Encyclopaedia of Islam (Second ed.). doi:10.1163/1573-3912_islam_SIM_7341. ISSN 1573-3912.
