= Maxims of Islamic law =

The maxims of Islamic law (Arabic: القواعد الفقهية, romanized: al qawā'id al fiqhiyya, sing. قاعدة فقهية, qā'idatun fiqhiyyatun) were established after representatives of all schools of thought regarding Muslim jurisprudence (fiqh) came together to reach a consensus. Maxims refer to a body of abstract rules that were produced after a detailed study of the fiqh. They are guidelines corresponding to all aspects of fiqh.

== The five normative maxims of Islamic law ==
- Acts are judged by their intentions (Arabic: الأمور بمقاصدها, romanized: al 'umūru bi maqāsidihā, lit. 'things are by their objectives')
- Harm must be eliminated (Arabic: الضرر يزال, romanized: aḍ ḍararu yuzāl, lit. 'harm is disappeared')
- Certainty is not overruled by doubt (Arabic: اليقين لا يزول بالشك, romanized: al yaqīnu la yazūlu bi ash shakk)
- Cultural usage shall have the weight of law (Arabic: العادة محكمة, romanized: al 'ādatu muḥakkamatun, lit. 'habits are ruled by')
- Hardship begets facility (Arabic: المشقة تجلب التيسير, romanized: al mashaqqatu tajlib at taysīr)
