= Rukhsa =

Rukhṣa (Arabic رخصة, concession, alleviation, facilitation, permission, plural rukhaṣ رخص) is a technical term in the discipline of uṣūl al-fiqh in Islamic law that is mostly applied on ibadah. It is a special dispensation from performing an obligatory act or from submitting to a prohibition, as a result of a mitigating circumstance (ʿudhr). The result is the replacement of a command with an easier alternative in cases of need or duress.

The opposite of rukhṣa is ʿAzīma (عزيمة, request) which means the request to observe the duty without consideration of any obstacles.

A permission of this kind, which is found in the quran is the permission to eat prohibited food in cases of emergency to avoid the death of hunger (Sura 5:3), and the recommendation to use sand instead of water for cleaning for salah (tayammum Sura 4:43, 5:6). Other permissions are based on sayings of the Islamic prophet Muhammad, like denying the own faith in case of danger to life. Also the exemption of fasting the month of Ramadan for menstruating women, ill people, travellers, pregnant and breastfeeding women is known as rukhṣa. In some cases rukhṣa leads to the complete opposite of an original provision such as visiting the graves, which was prohibited first, than allowed with a rukhṣa by Muhammad.

Basic to the rukhṣa-concept is the following hadith: "Really, Allah loves his dispenses to be fulfilled, like his requests (inna Llāha yuḥibbu an tuʾtā ruḫaṣu-hū kamā yuḥibbu an tuʾtā ʿazāʾimu-hū). The sahabah Abd Allah ibn Abbas is quoted : "Rukhṣa is like a sadaqah, which Allah gives; do not deny it.((ar-ruḫṣa min Allāh ṣadaqa fa-lā taruddū ṣadaqata-hū)

== Sufi teachings ==
Sufis, however, were often called to seek the divine reward that results from adhering to the 'aza'im. For example, while God allowed people to marry in the ruchsa, they sought the 'zīīma of celibacy. In particular, in the Sufi Order of the Naqshbandi emphasis was placed on the observance of'Azā'im, but other Muslims were allowed to use the Ruchsa facilities. This is based on the idea that the'Azā'im are for the strong, whereas the Ruchas are for the weak. This is also the basic idea of the treatise "The Chidric Measure" (al-Mīzān al-Ḫiḍrīya) of the Egyptian Sufis 'Abd al-Wahhāb ash-Shārānī (1565). He developed there, with reference to the two principles Ruchsa and 'Azīma, the doctrine that the sharia had come down altogether in two stages, namely at the level of "mitigation" (takhfif) and the degree of "aggravation"(tashdid), each aimed at different groups of people. Asch-Sha'rānī describes in his treatise how he received this teaching from Khidr, who traveled with him in seclusion and showed him the source of pure Sharia. Therefore, the treatise also has its name.
